= New York City in the American Civil War =

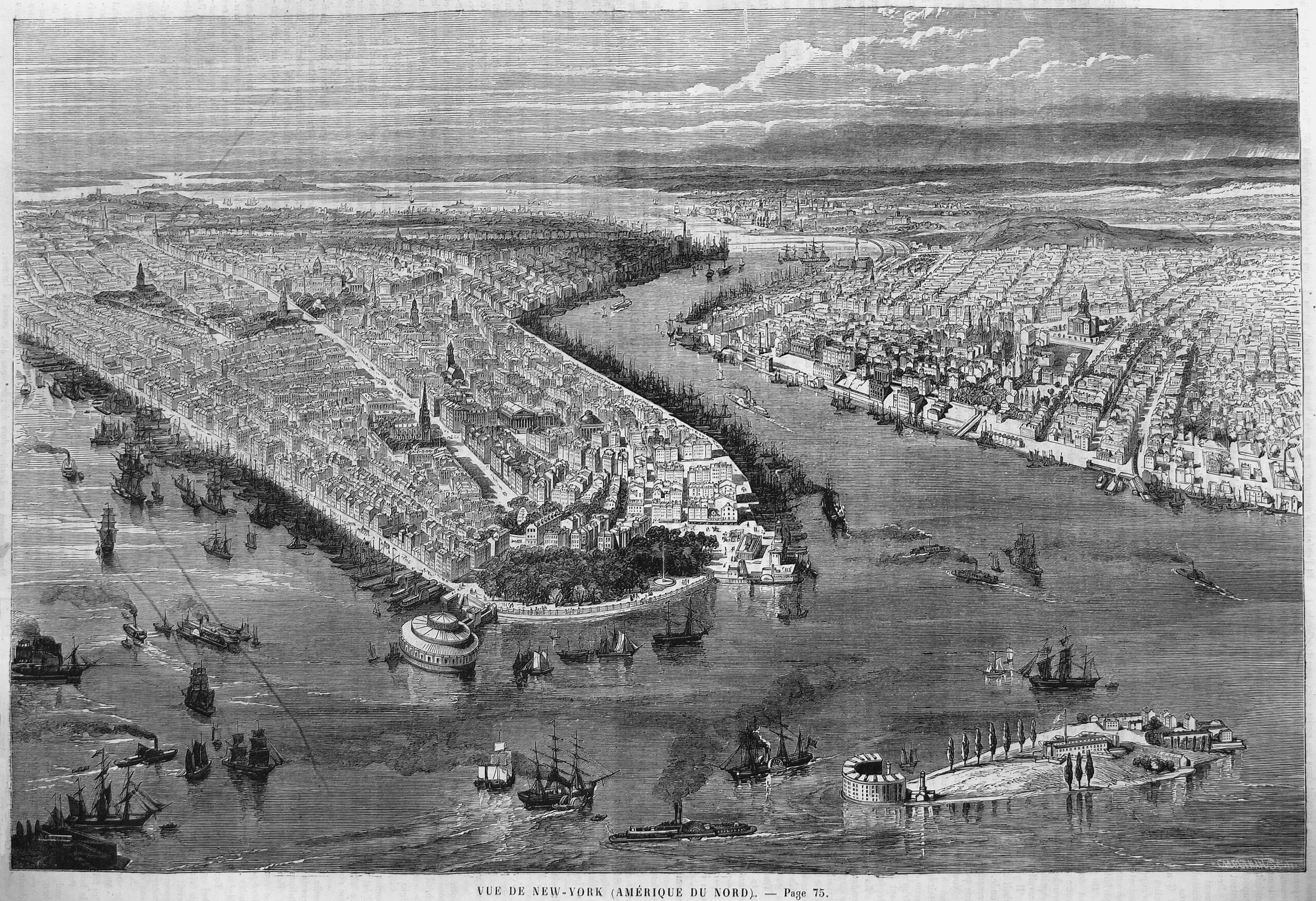
View of New York City, 1863

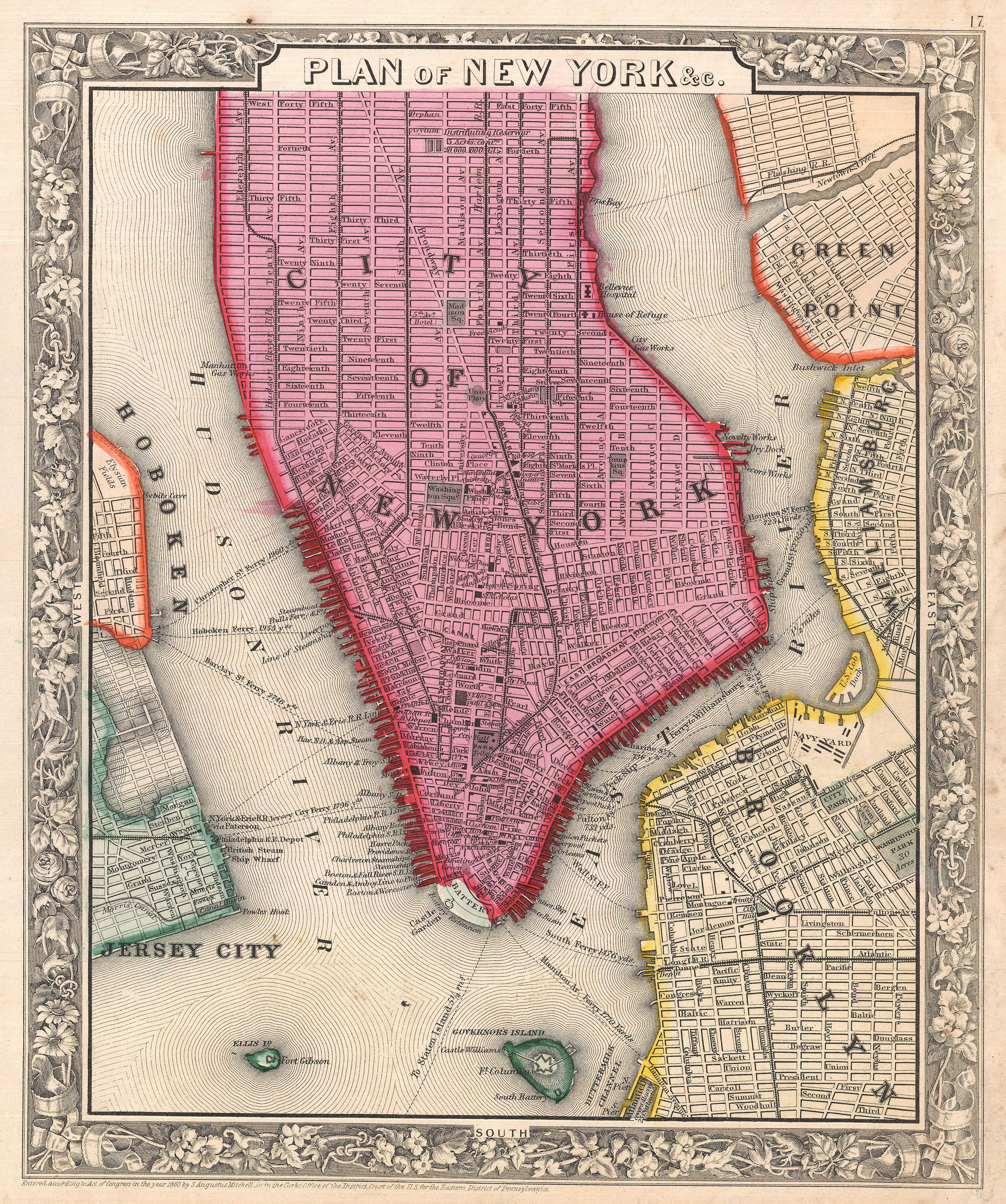
1860 map of New York City

New York City during the American Civil War (1861–1865) was a bustling American city that provided a major source of troops, supplies, equipment and financing for the Union Army. Powerful New York politicians and newspaper editors helped shape public opinion toward the war effort and the policies of U.S. President Abraham Lincoln. The port of New York, a major entry point for immigrants, served as recruiting grounds for the Army. Irish-Americans and German-Americans participated in the war at a high rate.

The city's strong commercial ties to the South, its growing immigrant population, and anger about conscription led to divided sympathies, with some business men favoring the Confederacy and other opinion in favor of the Union. The New York Draft Riot of 1863, provoked by fears of labor competition and resentment of wealthy men being able to buy their way out of the draft, was one of the worst incidents of civil unrest in American history and featured widespread ethnic Irish violence against blacks in the city. The neighboring City of Brooklyn, however, was more supportive of the war effort.

== Early war years ==
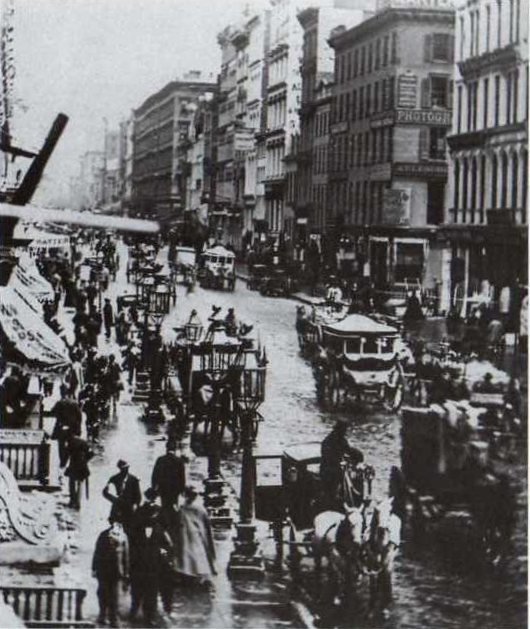
Broadway in 1860

New York City had long been the largest and in many ways the most influential city in the United States. By 1860, its population was a wide variety of diverse cultures, views, opinions, and politics. As Southern states began seceding with the election of Lincoln, New Yorkers in general supported the war effort, but there were several notable early exceptions.

The city and the state had strong economic ties to the South. By 1822, half of the city's exports were related to cotton, which also fed the upstate and New England textile mills. Mayor Fernando Wood won reelection to a second term, serving from 1860 to 1862. He was one of many New York Democrats who were sympathetic to the Confederacy and called "Copperheads" by staunch Unionists. In January 1861, Wood suggested to the City Council for New York City to secede as the "Free City of Tri-Insula" to continue its profitable cotton trade with the Confederacy. Wood's Democratic machine was concerned to maintain the revenues and jobs in the city (which depended on Southern cotton), which also supported the patronage system.

Politically, the city was dominated by Democrats, many of whom were under the control of a political machine known as Tammany Hall. Led by William "Boss" Tweed, the Democrats were elected to numerous offices in New York City, and to the state legislature and judges' seats, often through illegal means. From 1860 to 1870, Tweed controlled most Democratic nominations in the city, and Republicans tended to dominate Upstate New York. Lincoln supporters formed the Union League to support the war effort and the president's policies.

A series of U.S. Army forts, most constructed prior to the war, housed garrisons of Union troops to protect New York Harbor and the city from possible Confederate attack, but none occurred. Fort Lafayette, Fort Schuyler, and several others eventually were used to hold hundreds of Confederate prisoners-of-war. The Army established or expanded several large military hospitals, including McDougall Hospital and De Camp General Hospital, to serve the growing numbers of wounded and ill soldiers. Among the military innovations coming from New York City was the "Wig-Wag Signaling" system, tested in New York Harbor by Major Albert J. Myer.

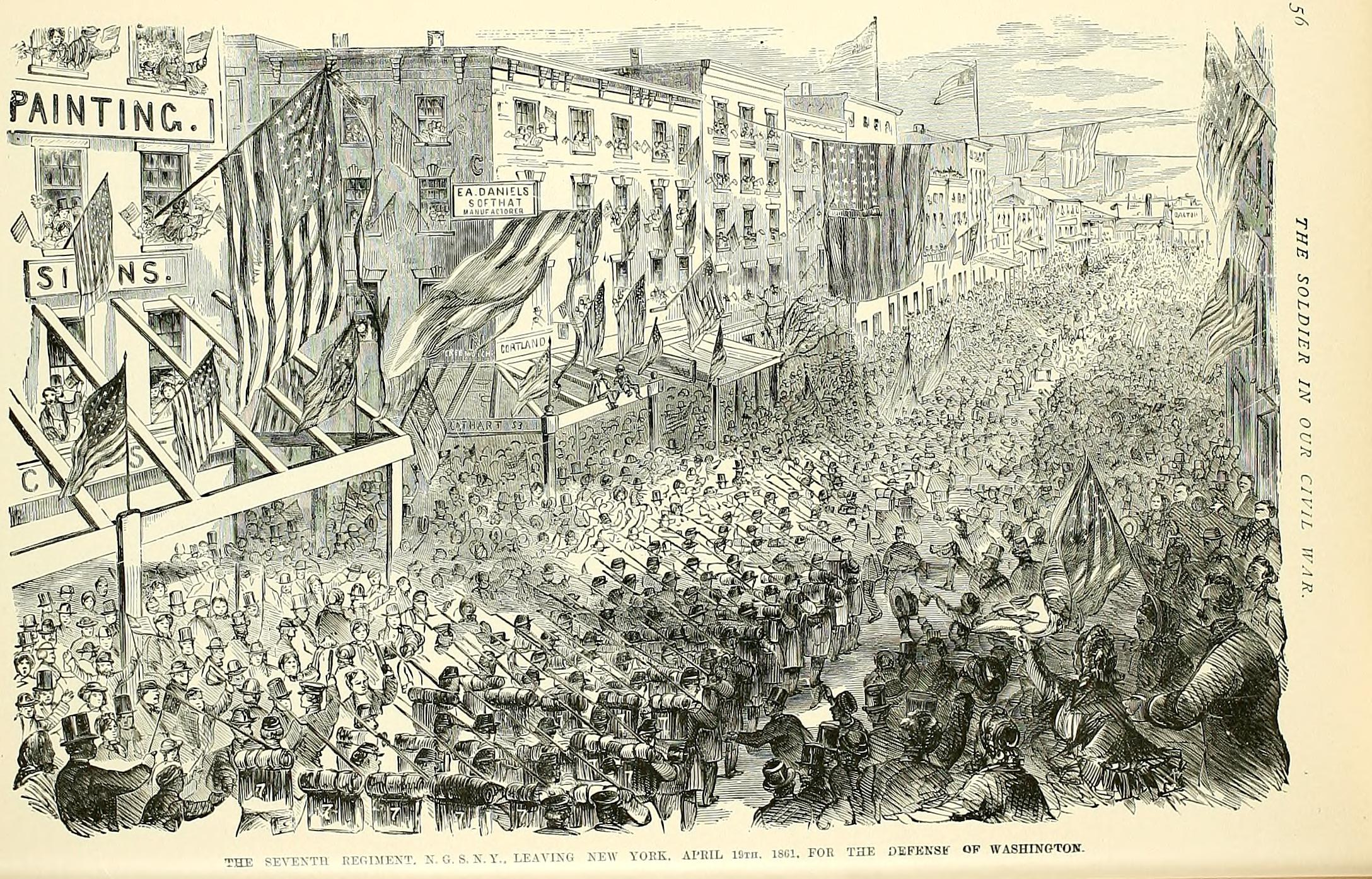
The 7th New York Militia Regiment leaving for Washington, D.C., April 19, 1861

Riker's Island was used as a military training ground for both white and United States Colored Troops during the Civil War; the latter were authorized in 1863. New soldiers were trained at "Camp Astor", named for the millionaire John Jacob Astor III, who provided funding for the army. Among the early regiments trained at Camp Astor were the Anderson Zouaves, commanded by Col. John Lafayette Riker, a descendant of the family who had owned the island.

The New York Navy Yard, established in 1801 in Brooklyn, was a major facility for the construction and repair of Union Navy ships. By the second year of the Civil War, the Yard had expanded to employ about 6000 men. In addition to government factories, hundreds of small private businesses throughout the New York area, such as the National Arms Company, provided military accoutrements, supplies, sundries, and items of use and comfort to the soldiers.

== Military recruitment ==
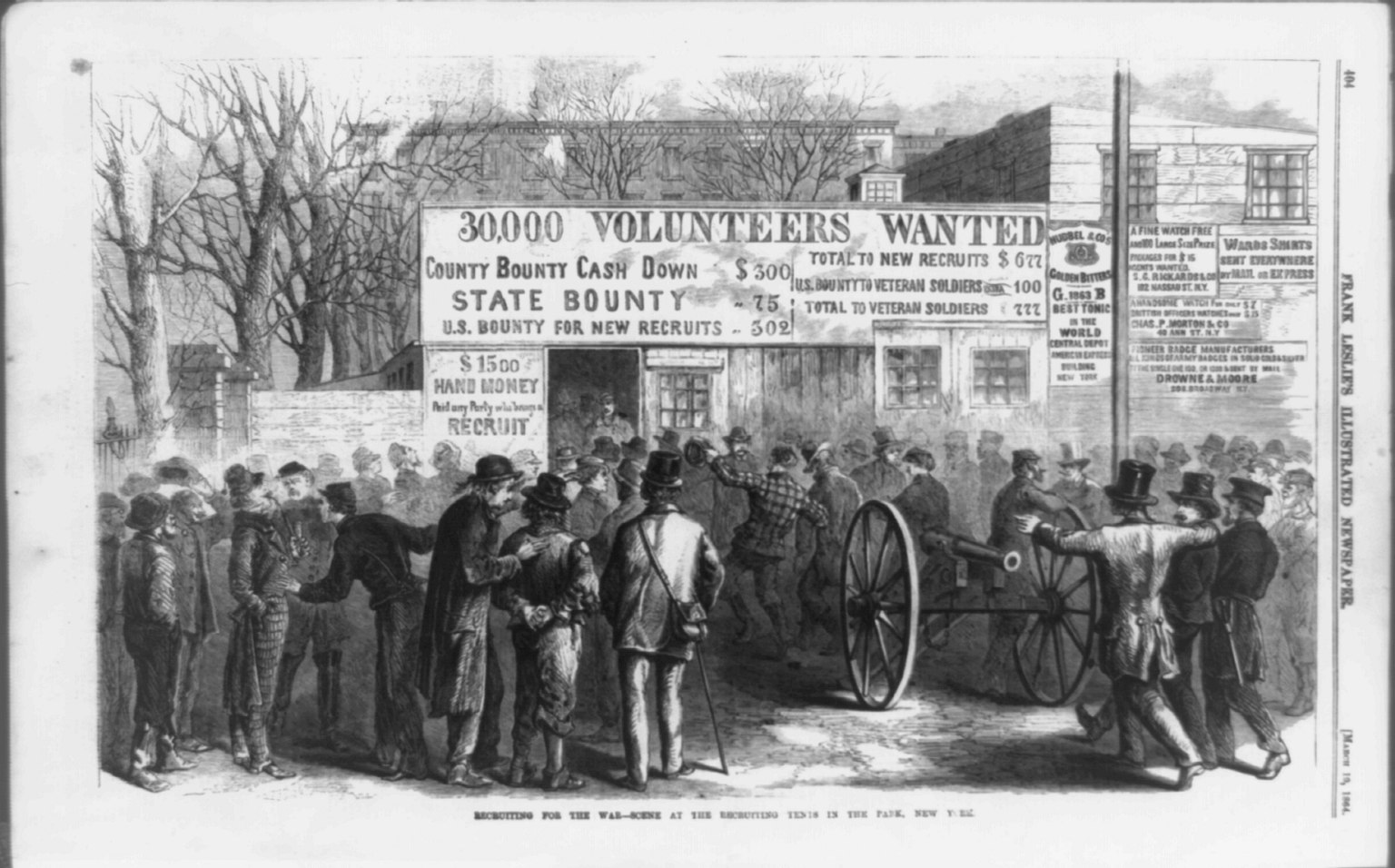
Recruiting tents in New York City

Despite pockets of objections to Lincoln's call for volunteers to serve in the Union army shortly after the bombardment of Fort Sumter, New Yorkers in general rushed to join the army or to raise financial and other support for the new troops. In one three-month period in early 1861, the city raised $150,000,000 for the war effort. By the end of May 1861, New York had raised 30,000 men for the volunteer army, including the "New York Fire Zouaves" (11th New York Volunteer Infantry Regiment) under a personal friend of Lincoln, Elmer Ellsworth. Troops paraded down Broadway to cheers and shouts as they left for the war. Over the course of the war, the city would send off over 100,000 troops collected from around the state. (based on New York State records, New York City raised over 150,000 volunteers, not including the tens of thousands of militia called up during emergencies during the war. In addition, 30 to 50,000 sailors joined the Navy at New York City.)

Beside the Fire Zouaves, other regiments raised in New York City became prominent in the Union army, including the 1st U.S. Sharpshooters (under Col. Hiram Berdan), the 9th New York Volunteer Infantry Regiment (Hawkins' Zouaves), and the 10th New York Volunteer Infantry Regiment ("National Guard Zouaves").

In 1862, George Opdyke was elected as mayor of New York City, succeeding Fernando Wood. A staunch supporter of Lincoln since before the war, Opdyke worked hard to raise and equip more state troops, and to prevent commercial panics on Wall Street as the Union's war successes waxed and waned. Under his leadership, recruiting efforts were renewed, particularly targeted at the vast supply of immigrants.

== Draft riots ==
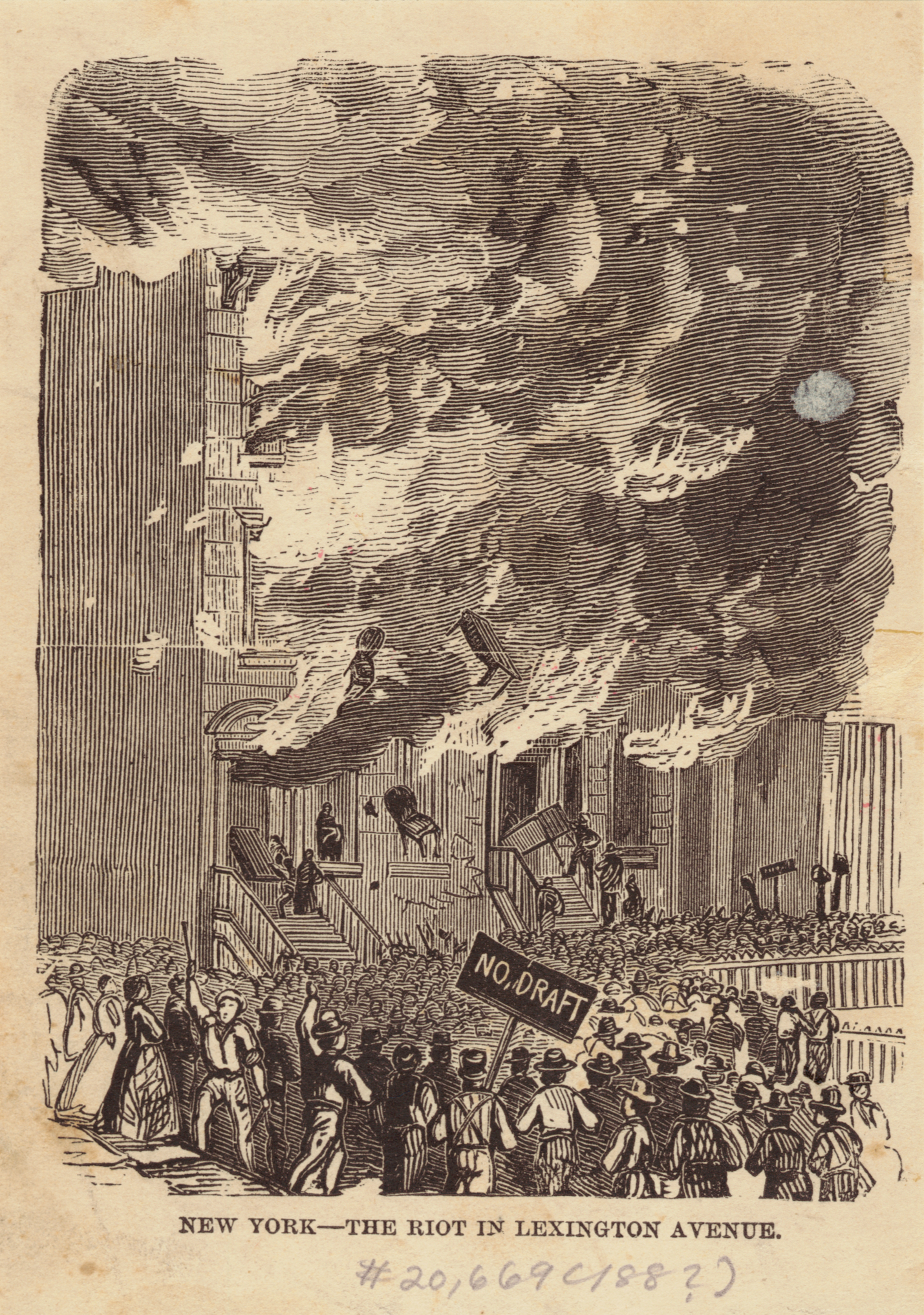
Rioters attacking a building on Lexington Avenue.

President Lincoln and much of the Republican element of the U.S. Congress, concerned with the numbers of veteran troops whose terms of enlistments had expired and wanting to press the war to a conclusion, had approved of a conscription law to draft soldiers into the army to augment the number of volunteers. "Draft Week" in New York City was scheduled for mid-July 1863. Because of opposition to the draft, Lincoln sent several regiments of militia and volunteer troops (some fresh off the Gettysburg battlefield) to control the city. The rioters numbered in the thousands, and were predominantly Irish Catholics.

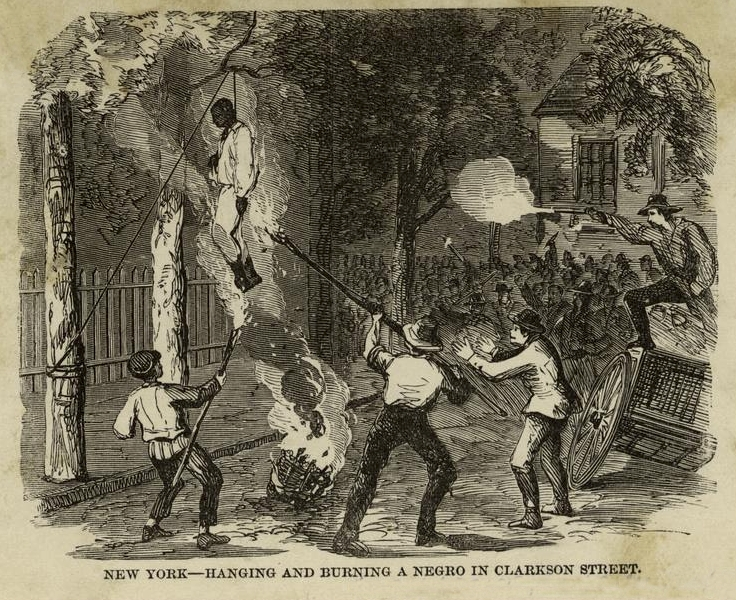
Lynching of Black man during the Draft Riots in New York, 1863

Initially intended to express anger at the draft, which wealthier men could buy substitutes for, the protests quickly degraded into civil disorder against the Republicans and especially against Black Americans. The conditions in the city were such that Maj. Gen. John E. Wool stated on July 16, "Martial law ought to be proclaimed, but I have not a sufficient force to enforce it." Using artillery and fixed bayonets, after the first day the military suppressed the mob, but not before numerous buildings were ransacked or destroyed, including many homes, the Tribune office, an orphanage for blacks, and P.T. Barnum's museum of oddities.

== Media and the war ==
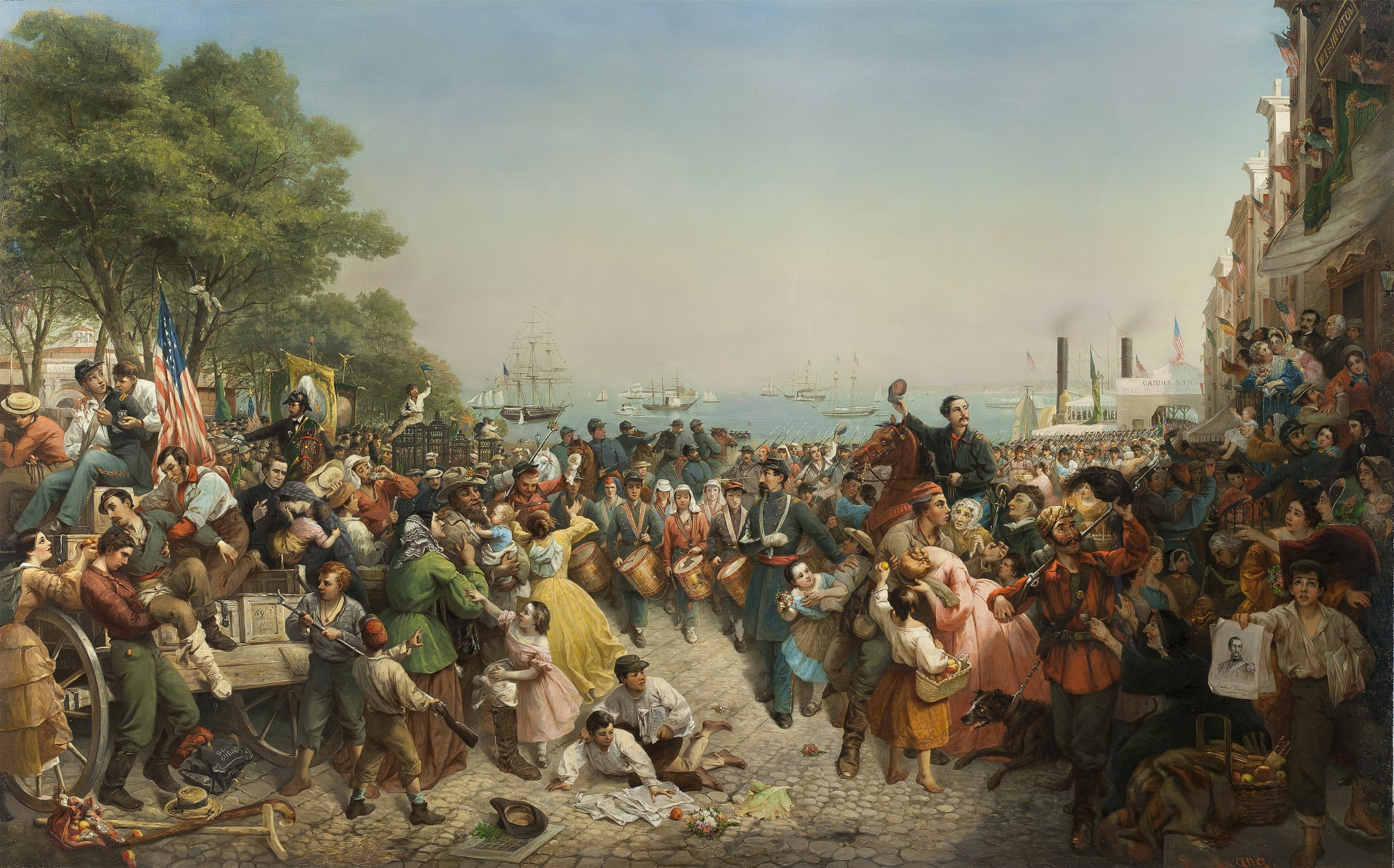
Return of the 69th (Irish) Regiment after the First Battle of Bull Run, July 27, 1861, painting by Louis Lang

New York City had a number of widely read newspapers and periodicals, whose influence was felt across the country. Horace Greeley, one of the founders of the Republican Party, developed his New York Tribune into America's most influential newspaper from 1840 through 1870. Greeley used it to promote the Whig and Republican parties, as well as anti-slavery and other reform movements. Greeley, who during the secession crisis of 1861 had espoused a hard line against the Confederacy, became a voice for the Radical Republicans during the war, in opposition to Lincoln's moderation. By 1864 he had lost much of his control over the newspaper, but wrote an editorial expressing defeatism regarding Lincoln's chances of reelection. As his editorials were reprinted across the country, his pessimism was widely read.

The New York Herald, under owner James Gordon Bennett Sr., regularly criticized Lincoln's administration and policies, although Bennett and his paper strongly supported the Union. He had endorsed John C. Breckinridge early in the 1860 presidential campaign, then shifted to John Bell. In 1864, Bennett promoted George B. McClellan against Lincoln, but officially endorsed neither candidate.

In addition to the powerful newspapers, New York City was the site of the printing presses of several other important periodicals, such as Harper's Weekly, Frank Leslie's Illustrated News, and New York Illustrated News. The political cartoonist Thomas Nast became a well-known commentator on the war, and his efforts helped stir patriotism and fervor for the Union. Field war correspondents and artists such as Alfred Waud provided the public with first-hand accounts from the Northern armies.

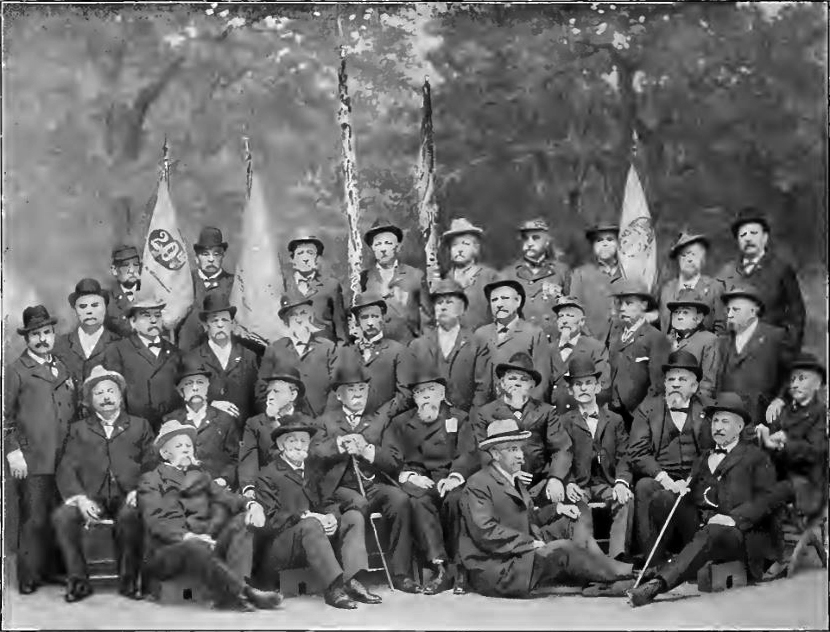
Civil War veterans, 20th New York Volunteer Infantry Regiment, 1900

Two journalists for the Brooklyn Eagle conspired to exploit the financial situation during early part of 1864, a plot known as the Civil War gold hoax. On May 18, two New York City newspapers, the New York World and the New York Journal of Commerce, 400,000 more men into the Union army. Share prices soon fell on the New York Stock Exchange when investors began to buy gold, and its value increased 10%. Officials finally traced the source of the story to the two men from the rival Brooklyn newspaper and arrested them.

Thomas W. Knox, a veteran journalist for the New York Herald, published a series of scathing attacks on General William Tecumseh Sherman and his men. These contributed to speculation over Sherman's sanity. Knox printed important information related to the Vicksburg Campaign that led to his being charged, tried, and found guilty of disobedience of orders, although he was acquitted on espionage charges.

== 1864 Election Day sabotage ==
Secret agents from the Confederacy operated in New York City throughout the war, providing information on troop strengths, political views, shipments, etc. to the government in Richmond. Some of these agents planned an act of terrorism for Election Day in November 1864, to burn down several leading city hotels. The plot was initially foiled due to a double agent who turned over communications to Federal officials, and to a massive military presence that deterred the plotters. Election Day, November 8, passed without incident. But, on November 25, the saboteurs finally struck, setting fires at several hotels and other leading landmarks, including P. T. Barnum's museum, which had been rebuilt following the Draft Riots the year before. The city's firefighters extinguished most of the blazes, and the majority of the conspirators escaped to Canada. However, former Confederate officer Robert Cobb Kennedy was arrested, court-martialed, and hanged at Fort Lafayette in the harbor on 25 March 1865.

== Civil War notables from New York City ==
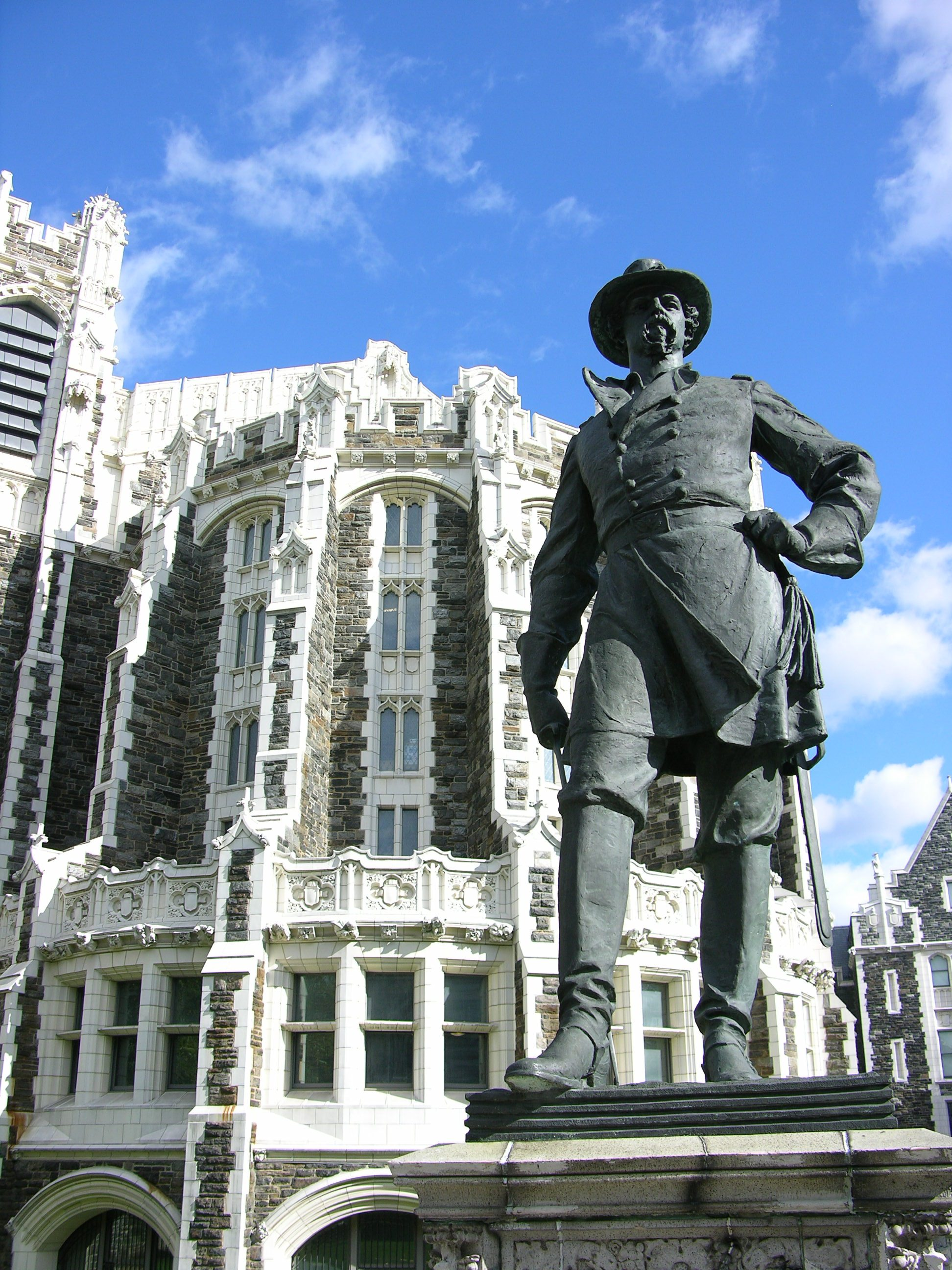
Statue of Alexander S. Webb at City College of New York campus in Harlem, New York City

- John Jacob Astor III - financier, brevet brigadier general in the Union Army
- Richard Delafield - major general in charge of New York's defenses
- Thomas Devin - cavalry divisional commander in the Union army
- Hamilton Fish - former Congressman; financier and commissioner
- Benjamin F. Isherwood - U.S. Navy officer who pioneered engineering innovations
- Alexander S. MacKenzie - U.S. Navy officer
- Dennis Hart Mahan - USMA professor at West Point; expert in siege warfare
- Wesley Merritt - cavalry general in the Union Army
- Timothy H. O'Sullivan - pioneer photographer
- James B. Ricketts - Union army general
- Daniel Sickles - corps commander in the Army of the Potomac
- John Slidell - Confederate political agent
- Alexander S. Webb - division commander in the Army of the Potomac

== See also ==
- New York in the American Civil War - the statewide situation
- History of New York City (1855–97)
- Confederate Army of Manhattan
- St. Nicholas Hotel (New York City)
