= McDougall Hospital =

McDougall General Hospital
- U.S. Army

Geography
- Location: Fort Schuyler, The Bronx, New York, United States
- Coordinates: 40°48′20″N 73°47′31″W

Organization
- Care system: Military
- Type: Military

Services
- Beds: 2,000

History
- Opened: October, 1862
- Closed: September 1865

Links
- Lists: Hospitals in New York State
- Other links: Hospitals in The Bronx

McDougall Hospital was a U.S. Army military hospital located at Fort Schuyler in New York City before and during the American Civil War.

The hospital was opened in October 1862 until being temporarily closed in February 1864. The hospital received 4,505 patients during that time period. It was reopened in May, 1864 and permanently closed in September 1865. The hospital received 7,587 patients during that time period. It had a capacity of 2,000 beds. In October 1863, the hospital was "to be removed without delay"; it was one of the oldest of the U.S. military hospitals. During the Civil War, about 16% of its patients were lost by desertion and failure to return from furlough.

In the Fall of 1864, the hospital housed 1600 patients. By the time that it was closed, in September, 1865, the hospital had received a total of 12,092 patients.

== See also ==
- List of former United States Army medical units
- New York City in the American Civil War
