= Fort Schuyler =

Landmark in the Bronx, New York

- Part of Harbor Defenses of Eastern New York 1898–1934
- Throgs Neck at East River and Long Island Sound, New York, New York
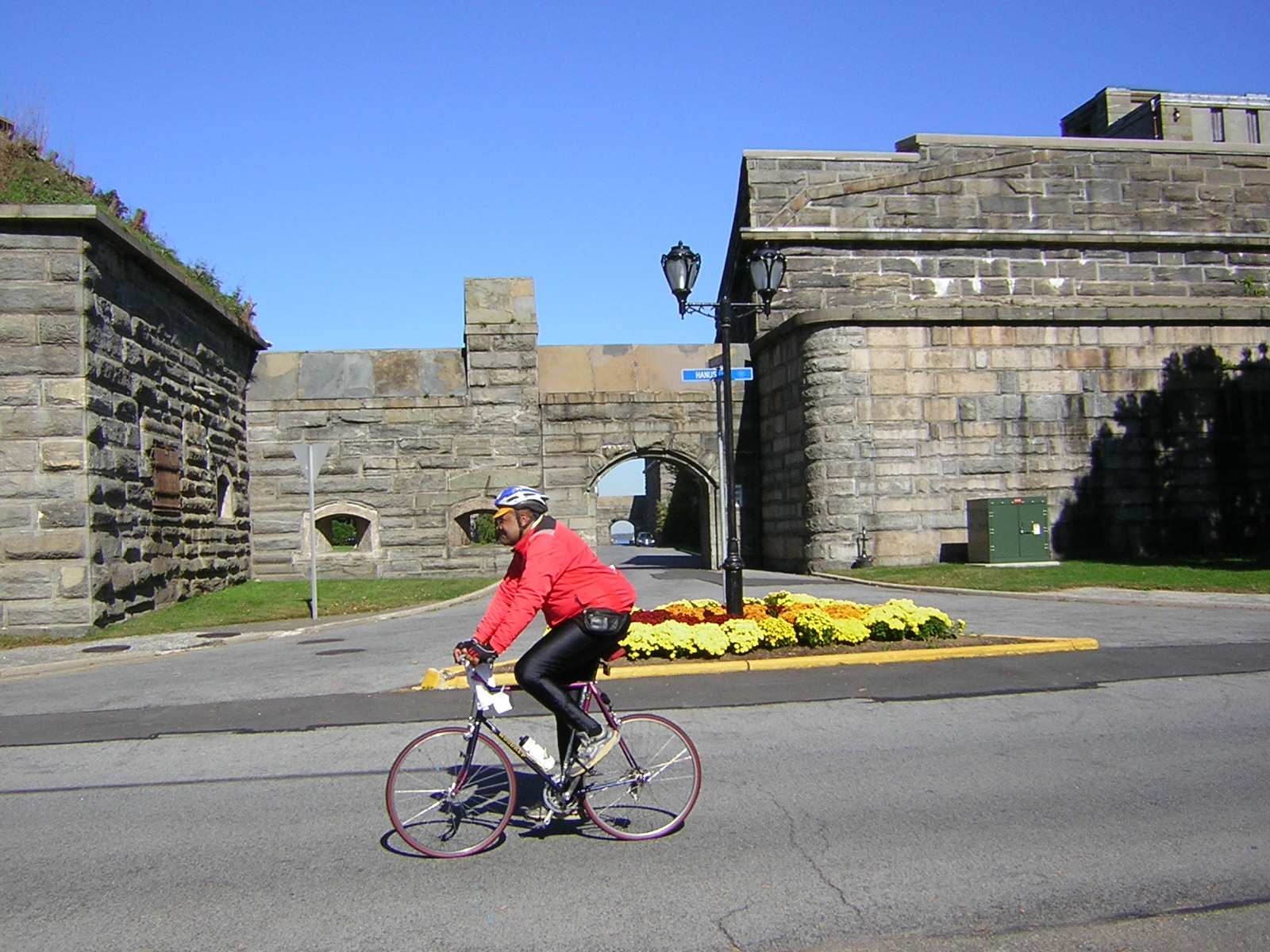
- Southern main gate

Site information
- Type: Garrison fort, training camp
- Owner: U.S. Government (1833–1934); State University of New York Maritime College (1934–present)
- Controlled by: United States Army (1833–1934); State University of New York Maritime College (1934–present)
- Open to the public: Yes
- Fort Schuyler
- U.S. National Register of Historic Places
- U.S. Historic district
- New York City Landmark
- Area: 17 acres (6.9 ha)
- Built: 1833–1856
- Architect: Capt. I.L. Smith (probably John Lind Smith (died 1858) of the US Army Corps of Engineers)
- Architectural style: Third system of US fortifications
- NRHP reference No.: 76001206
- NYCL No.: 0124

Significant dates
- Added to NRHP: June 29, 1976
- Designated NYCL: April 19, 1966
- Condition: Intact, occupied

Location
- Location within New York City Location within New York Location within the United States
- Coordinates: 40°48′20″N 73°47′31″W

Site history
- Built by: United States Army Corps of Engineers
- In use: 1861–present
- Battles/wars: American Civil War; World War I

1934 drawing of Fort Schuyler, from the Historic American Buildings Survey

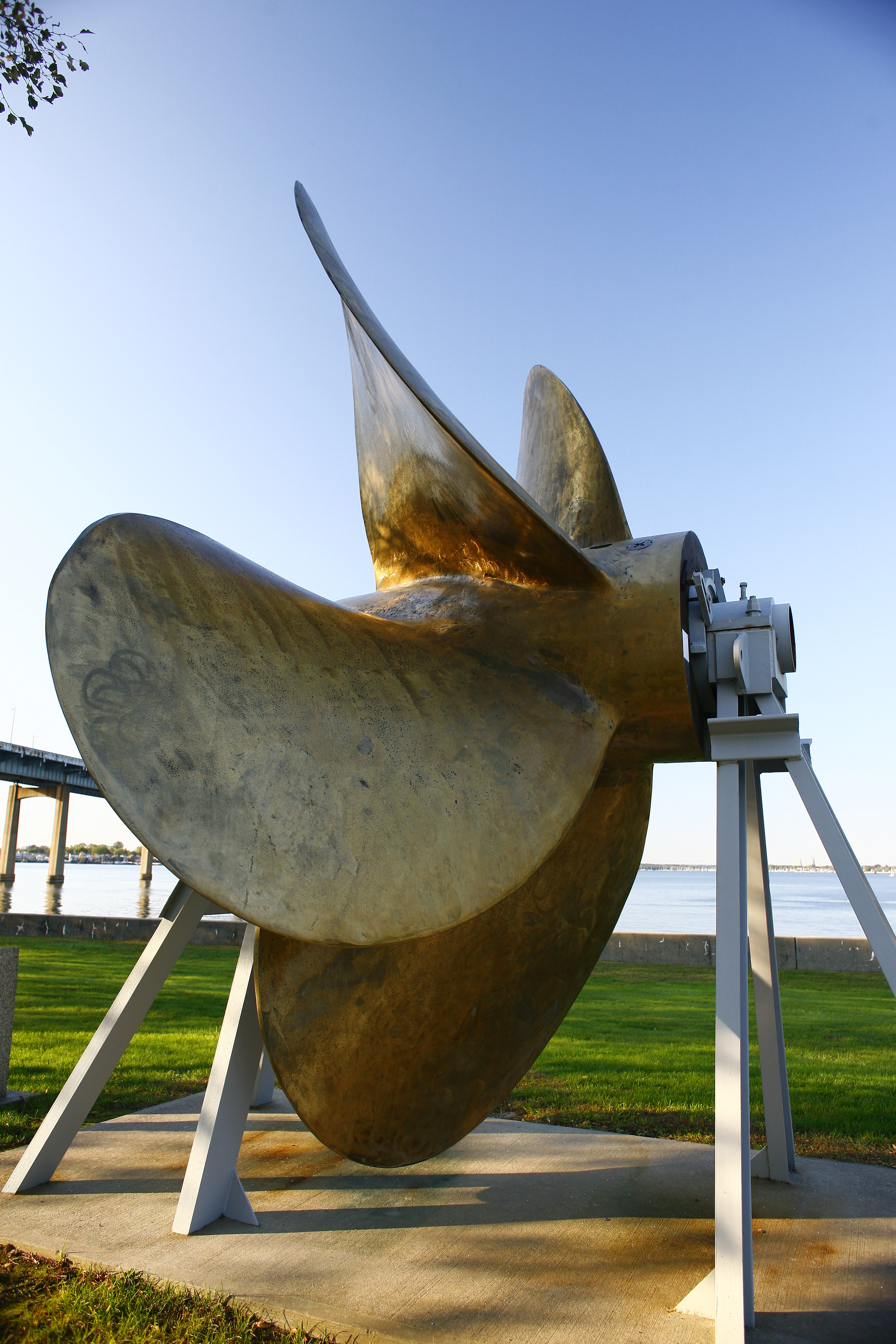
Propeller of the SS United States

Fort Schuyler is a preserved 19th century fortification in the New York City borough of the Bronx. It houses a museum, the Stephen B. Luce Library, and the Marine Transportation Department and Administrative offices of the State University of New York Maritime College. It is considered one of the finest examples of early 19th century fortifications. The fort was named in honor of Major General Philip Schuyler of the Continental Army.

== History ==
Fort Schuyler was one of many forts built along the east coast of the United States under the third system of US fortifications in the aftermath of the War of 1812, when it became apparent that the U.S. coast was poorly defended against foreign invasion. Fort Schuyler was begun in 1833 and dedicated in 1856 after 75% completion, though not garrisoned until 1861. The fort was strategically positioned to protect New York City from naval attack through Long Island Sound, guarding the eastern entrance to New York Harbor. It is located on Throggs Neck, the southeastern tip of the Bronx, where the East River meets Long Island Sound. Fort Totten, built during the Civil War and largely incomplete, faces it on the opposite side of the river. Their interlocking batteries created a bottleneck of defenses against ships attempting to approach New York City.

=== Design and construction ===
Fort Schuyler, at its peak, boasted 312 guns and could accommodate a garrison of 1,250 men. It was designed and built by the United States Army Corps of Engineers. Its position on Throggs Neck allowed four of its five sides to cover the water approach to New York City. Each of the four seacoast fronts had three tiers of cannon; ten guns per tier except on the north front, which had fourteen guns per tier. The bottom two tiers inside the fort were casemated, while the third tier on the roof had barbette mounts. Relatively small "tower bastions" of a type developed by US Army engineer Joseph G. Totten were at the three points where the seacoast fronts met. Each of these had twelve flank howitzers to protect the curtain walls of the fronts against assault, along with three heavy seacoast guns. Behind the fort were an extensive hornwork (unique in the third system) and an advanced redoubt (later demolished) to defend against a land attack. The hornwork had two demi-bastions protecting its face against a direct assault, along with a large ravelin extending northwest along the peninsula to break up an attack. Two additional demi-bastions protected the gap between the hornwork and the main fort. The demi-bastions and redoubt were armed with several flank howitzers each.

=== Civil War ===
During the American Civil War, Fort Schuyler held as many as 500 prisoners of war from the Confederate States Army and military convicts from the Union Army. It also included the McDougall Hospital, which had a capacity of 2,000 beds. The fort was well designed for its time, it is said to have had one of the most effective waste removal systems ever seen in a fort from this time period.

Fort Schuyler was also a mobilization and training center. Units trained at the fort before heading to combat included the 5th New York Volunteer Infantry "Duryee's Zouaves", the First California Regiment (later 71st Pennsylvania Infantry Regiment) under Senator and Colonel Edward Dickinson Baker, and the 69th and 88th New York Volunteer Infantry Regiments (the 1st and 2nd Regiments of Meagher's "Irish Brigade"). From January 1863 until March 1864, the fort itself was garrisoned by the 20th Independent Battery, New York Volunteer Artillery, a unit originally recruited to fight in the war as part of the Anthon Battalion of Volunteer Light Artillery.

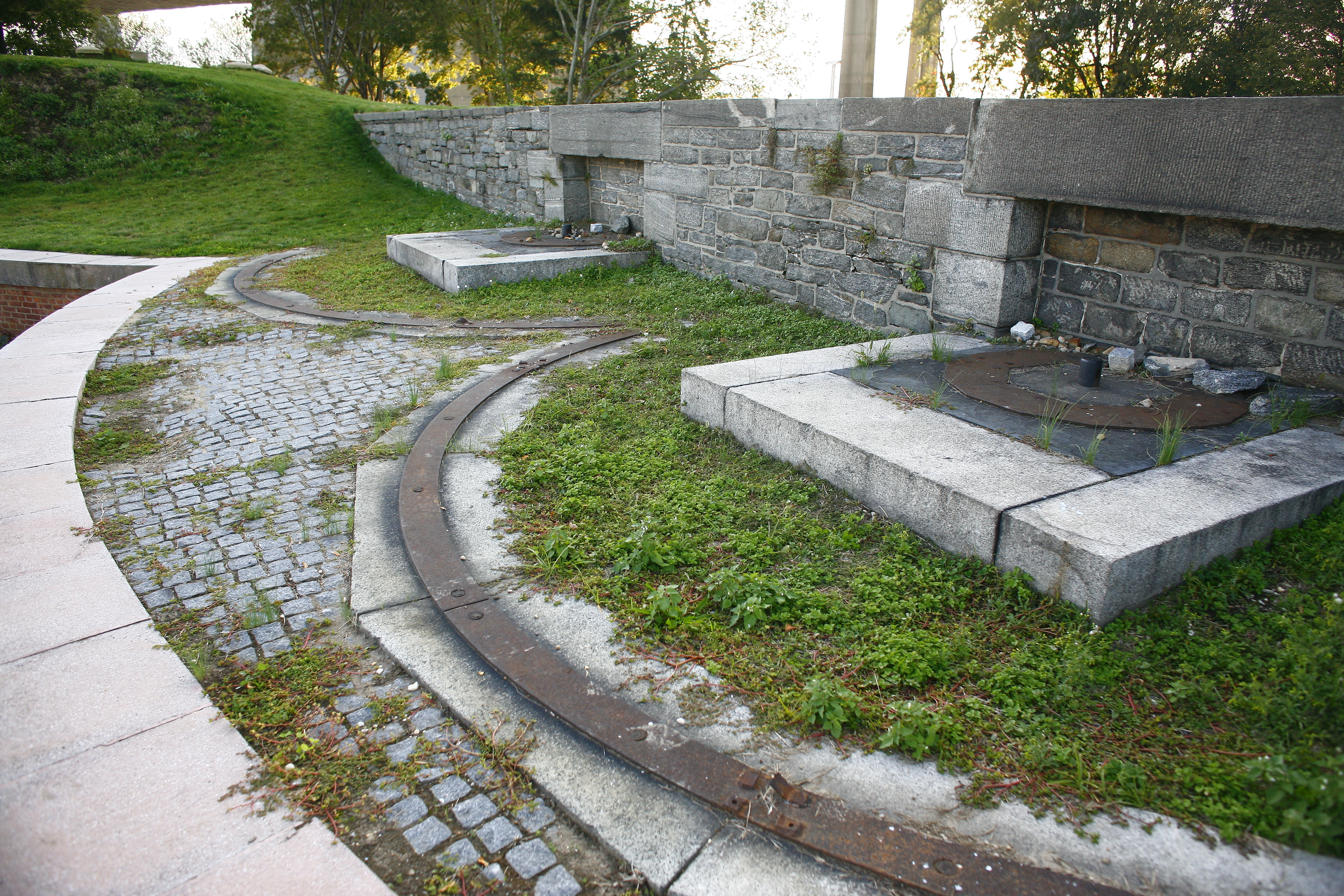
Typical barbette gun position on the fort's roof

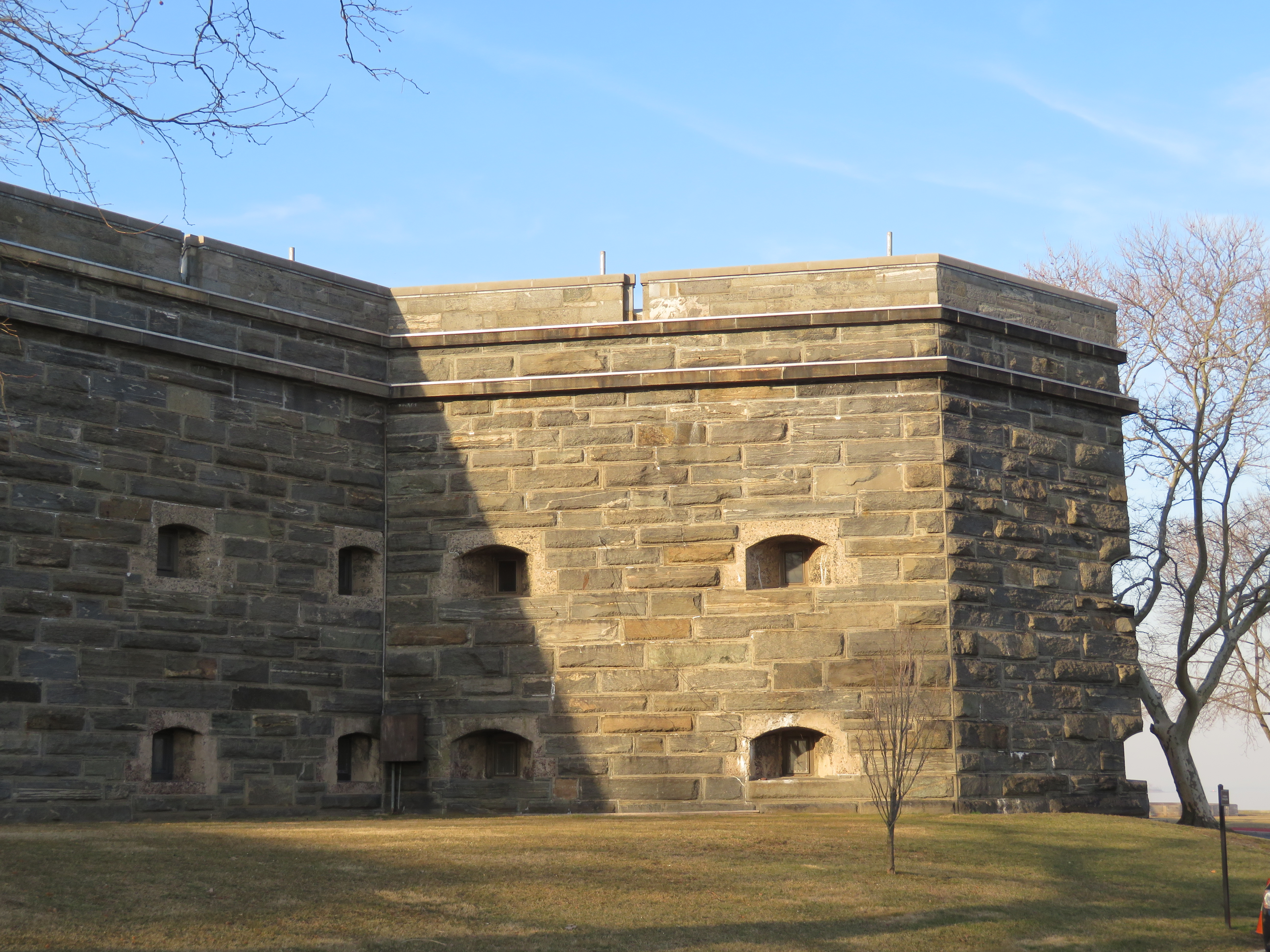
Fort Schuyer

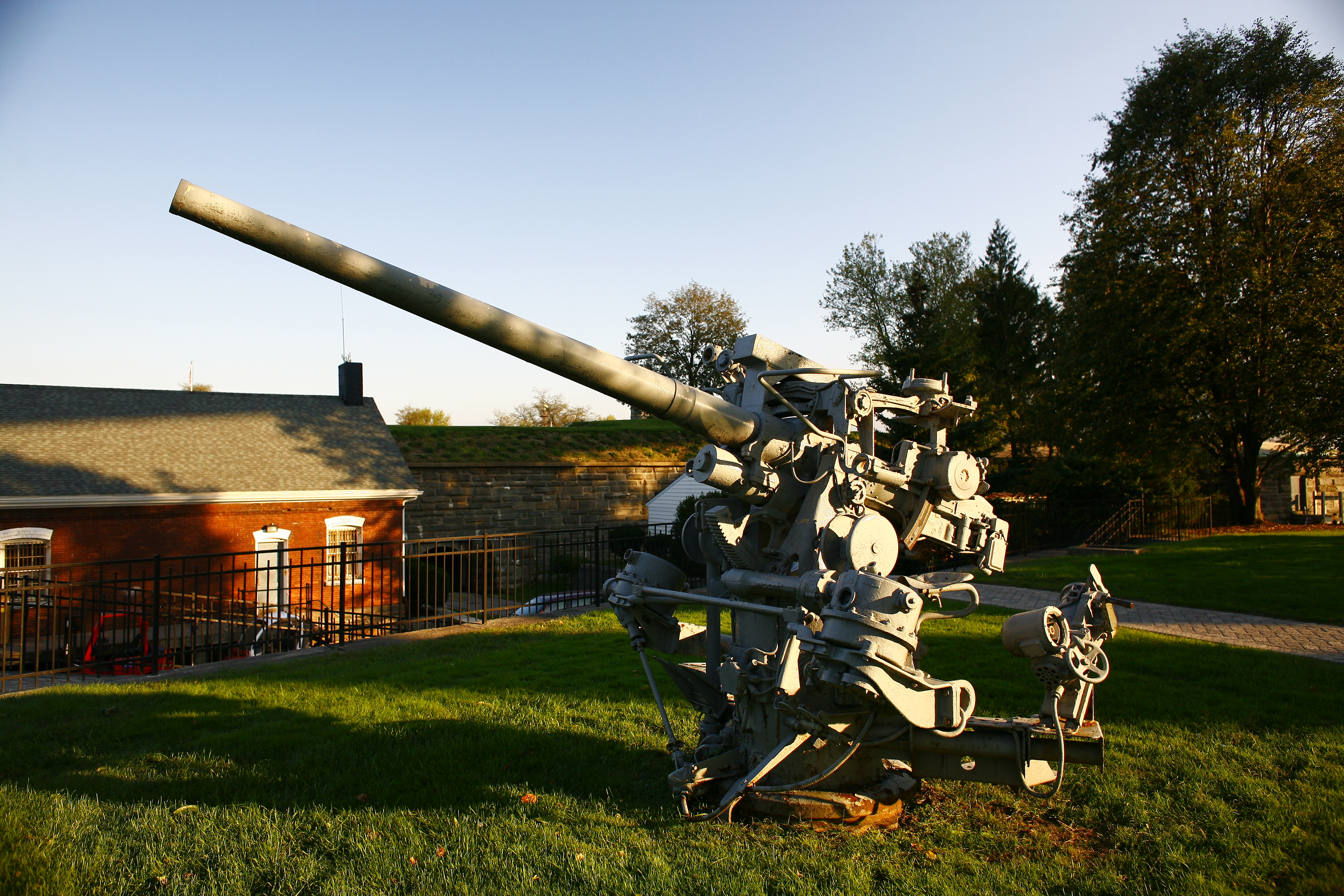
WWII 3"/50 caliber naval anti-aircraft gun on maritime mount

Duty at the fort was reported to be a dull assignment as the men took the roles of guards and hospital stewards, not artillerymen. From July until August 1865 the fort was garrisoned by companies A, B, C, F, G, H and I of the Anderson Zouaves (companies D and E being assigned to Fort Wood on Bedloes Island), upon their return from service with the VI Corps of the Army of the Potomac and duty in the defenses of Washington, D.C. The Anderson Zouaves finally mustered out from Fort Schuyler on August 30, 1865.

=== Endicott era ===
A ten-gun battery was built 1873–1876 as part of a general fort improvement program, along with a mine casemate (bunker) for a controlled minefield in the river, Fort Totten being an experimental station for coast defense minefields. Later, Fort Schuyler received several modern coastal artillery gun batteries under the Endicott Program, completed 1898-1900 as part of the Coast Defenses of Eastern New York, which also included new batteries at Fort Totten and Fort Slocum on Davids' Island. These included Battery Gansevoort with two 12-inch guns on disappearing carriages, Battery Hazzard with two 10-inch disappearing guns, Battery Bell with two 5-inch guns on retractable balanced pillar carriages, and Battery Beecher with two 3-inch guns on retractable masking parapet carriages. The forts were initially garrisoned by heavy artillery companies, which became coast artillery companies in 1901, and part of the United States Army Coast Artillery Corps in 1907, including US regular army, New York State Militia, and New York National Guard units. However, soon after completion the defenses of the East River were largely superseded by the Coast Defenses of Long Island Sound on islands east of Long Island, including Fort H. G. Wright on Fishers Island.

After the American entry into World War I in 1917, Battery Bell's 5-inch guns were removed for potential service in France as field guns on wheeled carriages. Most of the 5-inch guns removed under this program were sent to France with the 69th Artillery Regiment of the Coast Artillery Corps. However, the regiment did not complete training before the Armistice and did not see action. The 5-inch guns were never returned to the forts and were scrapped circa 1920. Prior to 1922 one 12-inch gun at Battery Gansevoort was dismounted; this may have been in 1917–18 as potential railway artillery. At some time, probably in 1918-1920, a battery of two 3-inch antiaircraft guns was built at the fort. In 1920, with the war over, Battery Beecher's 3-inch guns were scrapped as part of a general removal from service of the M1898 3-inch gun. The 10-inch guns of Battery Hazzard followed in 1930; the reason for this is unclear. In 1934 the fort was disarmed and turned over to the state. All of the Endicott-era batteries were demolished in the 1950s.

=== College ===
In the late 1920s Fort Schuyler was placed on the abandoned list by the U.S. Army. When this was done, it was targeted for acquisition by Robert Moses for conversion to a state park as well as a permanent shore base for the New York State Merchant Marine Academy (now SUNY Maritime College). A protracted political struggle ensued, but eventually the academy forces prevailed. The site was transferred to the state of New York in 1934 during the Great Depression, then rehabilitated by the Works Progress Administration and dedicated to the school in 1938. The college, which was founded in 1874, still occupies the site, and in 1948 was one of the original 29 founding schools to be incorporated into the State University of New York as the State University of New York Maritime College. The fort has been listed on the National Register of Historic Places since 1976.

=== Maritime Industry Museum ===
In 1986, a portion of Fort Schuyler was dedicated as the Maritime Industry Museum. The museum houses exhibits on the history of the United States maritime industry, including commercial shipping, the merchant marine, and the port of New York, as well as exhibits on the history of Fort Schuyler. It is open to the public on weekdays with guided tours and on weekends without tours.

== See also ==
- State University of New York Maritime College
- Throggs Neck
- Seacoast defense in the United States
- United States Army Coast Artillery Corps
- List of New York City Designated Landmarks in the Bronx
- National Register of Historic Places listings in the Bronx
