= List of New York City Police Department officers =

This is a list of notable New York City Police Department (NYPD) officers.

== Early years: 1845–1865 ==
Name	Portrait	Rank	Life	Service years	Comments	Ref.
Francis J. Banfield	No image available	Sergeant	1827–1883	1857–1883	Officer in charge of the State Armory at Second Avenue and Twenty-First Street. He was also a member of the "Steamboat Squad" later in his career.	
James Z. Bogart	No image available	Captain	1821–1881	1857–1870	During the New York Draft Riots, Bogart led a police force against rioters looting the home of J.S. Gibbons, a cousin of New York Tribune editor Horace Greeley.	
Charles N. Brackett	No image available	Captain	1831–1888	?–1888		
Samuel Brower	No image available	Captain			Police official who led a police detachment to cut down African Americans who had been hanged from lamp posts.	
Cornelius Burdick	No image available	Captain		?–1865	He led thirty-two police officers of the "Broadway Squad" who relieved Sergeant Francis Banfield and his men who were defending state armory.	
John Cameron	No image available	Captain	1807–1873	1857–1873	Organized the defense of several key buildings in Manhattan including the State Armory and the Union Steam Works during the New York Draft Riots.	
Daniel C. Carpenter	No image available	Inspector	1815–1866	1847–1873	Police detective who led squads against rioters in Broadway, the Fourth Ward, Second Avenue and other areas.	
Theron S. Copeland		Captain	1831–1905	1855–1903	Drill officer who co-led a police force with Captain John Dickson against rioters in Clarkston Street who were attacking local African American residents. It was their detachment which discovered the body of William Jones who had been tied to a tree and tortured to death.	
Abram P. DeVoursney	No image available	Captain	1827–1911		One of the officers who defended the New York Tribune during the New York draft riots.	
John F. Dickson	No image available	Captain	1821–1880	1850–1880	Co-led a police force with drill officer Theron Copeland who defeated rioters in Clarkston Street and chased off mobs attacking African Africans. His men discovered the body of William Jones who had been tied to a tree and tortured to death.	
George W. Dilks	No image available	Inspector	1816–1901	1848–1888	Led a force of two hundred officers into Second Avenue and recaptured the Union Steam Works, then being used as a headquarters and rallying point for rioters along the East Side Manhattan, after fierce hand-to-hand fighting against roughly five hundred rioters.	
Frederick Ellison	No image available	Sergeant			Patrolman who led one of the first detachments against rioters, he was cut off from his men during the fighting at Third Avenue and Forty-Fourth Street and severely beaten by a mob. He remained unconscious throughout the fighting and was not rescued until the arrival of Sergeant Wade several hours later.	
John S. Folk		Superintendent	1811–1885	1851–1885	First police chief of the Brooklyn Municipal Police. He defended both the New York Tribune and the Brooklyn Eagle during the Draft Riot of 1863.	
James Irving	No image available	Captain	1836–1885	1857–1876		
John Jourdan		Captain	1831–1870	1855–1870	Led group of sixty men from the Sixth Precinct which battled rioters for over five hours while patrolling African American settlements north and east of the Five Points district during the first day of rioting.	
James Leonard	No image available	Inspector	1820–1869	1845–1869		
John W. Mangin		Sergeant	1828–1897	1860–1897	Officer in command of a police detachment with fellow Sergeant S.B. Smith. Their later arrival eventually resulted in the defeat of rioters at Third Avenue and Forty-Fourth Street.	
Robert A. McCredie	No image available	Sergeant			Known as "Fighting Mac", he participated in the fighting at Third Avenue and Forty-Fourth Street. He and Sergeant Wolfe spearheaded an attack against rioters as police were slowly being driven down Third Avenue. McCredie forced the rioters back to Forty-Fifth Street but were eventually overwhelmed.	
Jeremiah Petty	No image available	Captain	1814–1889	1857–1887		
Galen Porter	No image available	Captain	1807–1883	1849–1865	Police official under Superintendent Kennedy involved in organizing police detachments against rioters. During the first hours, he sent sixty patrolmen to reinforce police against rioters on Third Avenue.	
Sergeant Van Orden	No image available	Sergeant			Officer who defended the State Arsenal at Seventh Ave. and 35th Street. against rioters during the first day of rioting. He had been ordered by Superintendent Kennedy to protect the building after reports that members of the Knights of the Golden Circle would attempt to capture the arsenal.	
Sergeant Wade	No image available	Sergeant			Officer who commanded police during the fighting at Third Avenue and 44th street. Although the rioters initially forced police to retreat, he regrouped the remaining patrolman and managed to disperse the mob with the later arrival of Sergeants John Mangin and S.B. Smith.	
Sergeant Wolfe	No image available	Sergeant			A participant in the fighting against rioters at Third Avenue and 44th street, he and Sergeant Robert McCredie forced the rioters back to Forty-Fifth Street but were eventually overwhelmed by the thousands of advancing rioters.	
Johannes C. Slott	No image available	Captain	1812–1874	1857–1870	He and Captain George Walling led an advanced guard into Ninth Avenue but forced to retreat under heavy fire from rioters.	
Stephen B. Smith	No image available	Sergeant			He and Sergeant John Mangin led a detachment of police officers who helped Sergeant Wade defeat rioters at Third Avenue and 44th street.	
Francis C. Speight	No image available	Inspector	1816–1877	1845–1877	Commanded police forces guarding the Broadway draft office. A number of his officers, including Sergeants Wade, Mangin, McCredie and Wolfe, later participated in fighting rioters at Third Avenue and 44th street.	
Peter Squires	No image available	Captain	1815–1863	1847–1863		
Henry V. Steers		Inspector	1832–1917	1857–1892		
Thomas S. Steers	No image available	Captain	1804–1884	1848–1870	One of the earliest police officials appointed to the Metropolitan police force; also played a prominent role in the Draft Riot of 1863.	
Thomas Woolsey Thorne	No image available	Inspector	1823–1885	1857–1885	Police official who commanded the 26th Precinct, operating from the basement of City Hall, and organized the defense of the New York Tribune. He was also a participant in the Police Riot of 1857.	
Jacob B. Warlow	No image available	Captain	1818–1890	1851–1875	Led detachment from the First Precinct against rioters in the waterfront area and later took part in the defense of the New York Tribune.	
George W. Walling		Captain	1823–1891	1847–1885	Police official who organized the first "Strong Arm Squad" which was responsible for breaking up the Honeymoon Gang in 1853. Sided with Mayor Fernando Wood during the Police Riot of 1857 but later served a warrant for the mayor's arrest. He played a major role during the draft riots breaking up several large mobs in the Bowery and other nearby districts.	

== Post-Civil War era: 1866–1899 ==
Name	Portrait	Rank	Life	Service years	Comments	Ref.
Anthony Allaire		Inspector	1820–1903	1865–1902	Credited for the breakup of many street gangs during the post-Civil War era, most notably the Slaughter House Gang and the Dutch Mob, and the arrest of murderer Daniel McFarland in 1869.	
William C. F. Berghold		Captain	1838–1909	1864–1895		
Nicholas Brooks		Inspector	1844–1925	1867–1906		
Edmund Brown		Captain	1837–1908	1864–1903		
Thomas F. Byrnes		Captain	1842–1910	1863–1895	Headed the NYPD Detective Bureau from 1880 until 1895. During his career, he was responsible for the arrests of countless gang leaders and other criminals of the era. He was also the detective in charge of the murder investigation of suspected Jack the Ripper victim Old Shakespeare.	
James Campbell		Captain	1836–1922	1863–1903		
Patrick Campbell		Superintendent	1827–1908	1870–1895		
Edward Carpenter		Captain	1847–?	1869–1892?		
Philip Cassidy		Captain	1841–1892	1870–1892		
William H. Clinchy		Captain	1844–1906	1865–1892		
Peter Conlin		Inspector	1841–1905	1869–1897		
Timothy J. Creedon	No image available	Captain	1840–1936	1864–1902	Police official and Civil War hero implicated in police corruption investigations during the 1890s. Admitted that he had paid $15,000 to "fixers" for Tammany Hall in exchange for his position.	
Joseph M. Dorcy		Detective	1845-1909	1865-1886	Police detective who pursued and captured a number of high-profile criminals, most notably, Whyos gang member Johnny Dolan in 1875 and embezzler Leon L.J. Bernard in 1876.	
Thomas L. Druhan		Inspector	1844–1925	1870–1906		
Joseph B. Eakins		Inspector	1844–1908	1866–1895		
John W. Eason		Captain	1843–1903	1864–1903		
Michael Foley	No image available	Captain	1845–1920	1876–1878	Advancing thru the NYPD ranks as patrolman, roundsman, and then 10th Precinct Captain. Constantly vigilant for nefarious operators of "disorderly houses" and local criminals like Owen Geoghegan.	
Ira S. Garland		Inspector	1830–1902	1858–1890		
George Gastlin		Captain	1835–1895	1864–1890	First commander of the "Steamboat Squad" which eventually cleared out the waterfront area of river pirates, including breaking up the Hook Gang, by 1890.	
John Gunner		Inspector	1831–1898	1861–1891		
Henry D. Hooker		Captain	1830–1901	1861–1895		
William J. Kaiser		Captain	1842–1913	1866–1888		
Henry Kellett		Captain	1838–1898	1867–1889		
Thomas J. Kennedy	No image available	Captain	1834–1879	1860–1879		
Thomas Killilea		Captain	1838–1902	1866–1901		
Patrick H. Leavey		Captain	1843–1918	1866–1903		
Daniel J. Lowery		Captain	1846–1891	1874–1891		
John MacKellar		Inspector	1842–1900	1863–1900		
William J. McKelvey		Captain	1842–1900	1863–1898		
George W. McClusky	No image available	Inspector	1861–1912	1882–1912	Police official who led the NYPD Detectives Bureau and was involved in the Becker-Rosenthal murder trial.	
John H. McCullagh		Captain	1842–1893	1864–1893	Police official who closed down a number of well known panel houses including Shang Draper's operation which led to the breakup of his criminal gang.	
Charles McDonnell		Inspector	1841–1888	1863–1888	Police official who investigated vice districts, especially forced prostitution and white slavery, and arrested procuress "Jane the Grabber".	
Patrick H. McLaughlin		Inspector	1842–1909	1866–1905		
William W. McLaughlin		Inspector	1846–1933	1868–1907		
Thomas Murphy		Captain	1845–1911	1867–1917		
William Murray		Superintendent	1844–1908	1866–1892		
Samuel E. Price	No image available	Captain	1856–1914	1880–1914		
George R. Rhodes		Captain	1824–1900	1857–1887		
Thomas M. Ryan		Captain	1831–1907	1863–1895		
John Sanders		Captain	1844–1889	1866–1889		
William H. Schultz		Captain	1836–1904	1867–1904		
Max F. Schmittberger		Inspector	1851–1917	1874–1917	Police official implicated during investigations into police corruption. Testified that, as a police sergeant in the Tenderloin district, he collected payments from saloons, illegal gambling houses and other establishments and delivered to then precinct captain William Devery.	
Edward Slevin		Captain	1844–1895	1873–1895		
Elbert O. Smith		Inspector	1844–1910	1873–1907		
William John Ernest Stevens		Patrolman and Driver	1860–1917	1893–1915	Widely known in Brooklyn as the driver for various police inspectors. He was of powerful build and was at one time known as "Big Jack." In 1896 he won a silver cup for lifting 650 pounds from the floor without the aid of harness. After he went on the police force, where he served for 23 years, he was almost continuously the driver for inspectors. He was an Oddfellow and a member of the New York Veteran Policeman's Association. Retired 1915 because of physical disability.	
Alexander B. Wartz		Captain	1845–1894	1868–1894		
Josiah A. Westervelt		Captain	1849–1924	1867–1901		
Alexander S. Williams		Inspector	1839–1917	1866–1895	Police detective known as "Clubber Williams" who oversaw the Tenderloin and Gas House districts. In 1871, he led a "strong arm squad" into the district and was successful in breaking up the Gas House Gang.	
Cornelius Woglom		Captain	1815–1889	1859–1888		
Peter Yule		Captain	1830–1906	1870–1890		

== Early 20th century: 1898–1945 ==
Name	Portrait	Rank	Life	Service years	Comments	Ref.
John Alan Messeder Sr.	No image available	Sergeant	1910–1971	1934–1958	Sergeant in Special Investigations - spent time as a US Marine and driver for the President of the United States. Investigated new applicants at the New York Police Department. Allegedly involved in the take down of mobsters in a jewelry heist early in his career which promoted him to sergeant. Member of the Free masons.	
Charles Bacon			1885–1968		Member of the Irish American Athletic Club.	
Samuel J. Battle	No image available	Lieutenant	1883–1966	1911–1941	First black official NYPD police officer in New York City upon the merger of Brooklyn and Queens. In March 1891 Wiley Overton was the first police officer but resigned after worn down by the racism he faced from fellow officers. In January, 1893, less than two years after his hiring, he resigned his position. Moses Cobb was Brooklyn's second black policeman before the merger of the city in 1898 was the first to retire. He was Battle's brother in law and mentor.	
Charles Becker		Lieutenant	1870–1915	1893–1912	Convicted and executed for the 1912 murder of a Manhattan gambler Herman Rosenthal.	
George Bonhag			1882–1960		Member of the Irish American Athletic Club.	
Johnny Broderick		Detective	1894–1966	1923–1947	A popular "celebrity detective" during Prohibition, he headed the Industrial Squad in the 1920s and was famed for personally assaulting criminals and suspects.	
John Coughlin	No image available	Inspector	1874–1951	1896–1928	Served as head of the NYPD detectives division and was responsible for the capture of bank robber Frank Hamby. He was forced into retirement in the aftermath of the Arnold Rothstein murder in 1928.	
Sidney S. Cusberth	No image available	Detective	1904–1968	1929–1951	This African-American detective became one of the department's most highly decorated officers when he was awarded his 22nd citation for bravery and excellence in 1942. Cusberth was involved in numerous gunfights, killing seven holdup men.	
James E. Dillon	No image available	Fourth Deputy Commissioner/Chief Inspector of Brooklyn and Queens	1862–1925	1885–1918	On March 19, 1885, James E. Dillon was appointed to the Police Department as a "sparrow cop" in Central Park. In 1898, he was appointed to desk sergeant to the E. 35th Street Station. In 1899, he was appointed to lieutenant at the E. 126th Street Station. On January 4, 1904, he was appointed to captain. On June 7, 1911, he was appointed as the Fourth Deputy Police Commissioner by the late Mayor Gaynor and placed in charge of police trials. In 1916, he was appointed to Chief Inspector of Brooklyn and Queens, succeeding Max Schmidtberger. In 1917, Chief Inspector Dillon became ill and was confined to his home for six weeks. After falling ill, in February 1918, he held a four hour conference with the Mayor at City Hall where he announced he was going to Police Headquarters to submit an application for retirement. After his retirement, he went into the marine insurance business with his son until the time of his death in 1925.	
Michael Fiaschetti	No image available	Detective	1886–1960	1908–1922	One of the original five members of the NYPD's "Italian Squad", he succeeded Lt. Joseph Petrosino after his murder in 1909.	
Max Finkelstein	No image available	Captain	1884–1940	1911–1940	Jewish-American police captain who was hand-picked by Mayor Fiorello H. La Guardia to lead a special squad to protect visiting officials from Nazi Germany and the German consulate in 1938.	
John Flanagan			1873–1938	1903–1910	Member of the Irish American Athletic Club and the "Irish Whales".	
George Samuel Dougherty		Deputy Police Commissioner	1865–1931	1888–1913	One-time head of the NYPD Detectives Bureau, he is credited with introducing modern-day fingerprinting to the police force. He was involved in many high-profile criminal cases, most notably, solving the 1912 murder of Herman Rosenthal which resulted in the conviction and execution of fellow police detective Charles Becker and the Lenox Avenue Gang.	
John Eller			1883–1967	1905–1942	Member of the Irish American Athletic Club.	
Richard Enright		Police commissioner	1871–1953	1896–1925	First police officer to be appointed police commissioner.	
Egon Erickson			1888–1973	1911–1939	Member of the Irish American Athletic Club.	
Simon Gillis			1875–1964		Member of the Irish American Athletic Club and the "Irish Whales".	
Isabella Goodwin		Detective	1865–1943	1896–1924	First female police officer promoted to detective.	
Mary Hamilton	No image available		1872–1956	1917–1926	First director of the NYPD Policewomen's Bureau.	
William H. Hodgins	No image available	Captain	1856–1912	1888–1912	Longtime police captain who was credited with breaking up numerous street gangs, most notably the Eastman and Humpty Jackson gangs during the turn of the 20th century. He was also involved in the peace negotiations which eventually ended the Tong wars in Chinatown.	
Robert H. Holmes	No image available		1888–1917	1913–1917	First African-American police officer to die in the line of duty.	
Pat McDonald			1878–1954		Member of the Irish American Athletic Club and the "Irish Whales".	
Matt McGrath		Inspector	1875–1941		Member of the Irish American Athletic Club.	
Emil Muller	No image available		1891–1958		Member of the Irish American Athletic Club.	
John J. O'Connell	No image available	Detective Sergeant	1884–1946	1905–1945	Credited for the arrests of Owney Madden and Tanner Smith. Later served as head of the NYPD Police Academy and Chief Inspector.	
Joseph Petrosino		Lieutenant	1860–1909	1883–1909	First Italian-American detective sergeant of the NYPD's Homicide Division and head of the "Italian Squad", he was a pioneer in the fight against organized crime in the United States. He was murdered while secretly investigating the Sicilian Mafia in Palermo.	
Phil Regan		Detective	1906–1996		Later became a singer and film actor best known for his role as "The Singing Cop" in several musical comedies for both Republic and Monogram studios. In 1972, he was convicted for bribery in a real estate scandal.	
Barney Ruditsky	No image available	Detective	1898–1962	1921–1940	Was a popular "celebrity detectives" during Prohibition. He later became a private detective, night club owner, and technical adviser in Hollywood.	
Harry Schaaf		Patrolman		1912–1943	Member of the Irish American Athletic Club.	
Mary Shanley		Detective	1896–1989	1931–1957	Fourth woman to reach first-grade detective; first to fire her weapon in an arrest.	
Martin Sheridan		Sergeant	1881–1918	1906–1918	Member of the "Irish Whales".	
Patrick Sheridan	No image available	Lieutenant	1872–1942	1896–1937	Commander of Gangster Squad.	
Mary A. Sullivan		Lieutenant	1878/1879–1950	1911–1946	Twenty year head of the Policewoman's Bureau, first woman homicide detective.	
Antonio F. Vachris		Lieutenant	1866–1944	1893–1919	One time head of the Italian Branch of the New York City Police Department.	
Cornelius Willemse	No image available	Captain	1871–1942	1900–1925	Longtime captain of the NYPD's Homicide Squad, he battled many major criminals of the era including Kid Dropper, Little Augie Orgen and Tom Flanagan.	

== Post-World War II: 1946–1977 ==
Patrick "Paddy" Barry		Lieutenant	1947	1973–1993		Ref.
Mario Biaggi		Detective Lieutenant	1917–2015	1942–1965	Retired as one of the most decorated officers in New York City Police Department history, and received the police department’s Medal of Honor (its highest award) and the National Police Officers Association of America’s Medal of Valor, after killing two people who attacked him, and being injured 11 times in the line of duty; Later elected to the U.S. House of Representatives ten times, he resigned in 1988 following his conviction in two illegal gratuity trials.	
William Caunitz	No image available	Detective Lieutenant	1933–1996	1954–1984	Later became a novelist.	
Emil A. Ciccotelli	No image available	Commander	1929–1998	1954–1992	Deputy Chief and Chief of Detectives involved in the prosecution of the five major organized crime families in New York City in the 1980s and early 1990s.	
Bill Clark		Detective	1944–	1969–1994	Later became an award-winning television writer and producer best known for his work on NYPD Blue and other police dramas.	
Ed Dee	No image available	Lieutenant	1940–	1961–1981	Later became a novelist.	
Ed Deacy	No image available	Detective	1946–	?–1989	One-time "official national anthem singer" for the New York City Police Department.	
Bo Dietl	No image available	Detective	1950–	1972–1985	Police detective turned media personality who has appeared on the Fox News Network and the Don Imus Show.	
Eddie Egan		Detective	1917–1995	1952–1972	He and fellow NYPD detective Sonny Grosso broke up an organized crime ring in 1961, seizing 112 pounds of heroin, later covered in the book and film The French Connection.	
Louis Eppolito and Stephen Caracappa	No image available	Detective(s)	1948– 1942–	1969–1990; 1969–1992	Associate members of the Gambino crime family who infiltrated the NYPD and carried out mob hits for the New York City underworld during the 1980s and 1990s.	
Nicholas Estavillo		Chief of Patrol	1945–	1968–2007	First Puerto Rican chief of patrol of the New York City Police Department.	
Sanford Garelik	No image available	Chief inspector	1918–2011	1940–1979	First Jewish chief inspector of the New York City Police Department.	
Martin Golden			1950–	1973–1983	Later became a member of the New York City Council and the New York State Senate.	
Sonny Grosso	No image available	Detective	1937–	1951–1976	He and partner Eddie Egan broke up an organized crime ring in 1961, seizing 112 pounds of heroin, later covered in the book and film The French Connection.	
Fred Heineman		Deputy chief	1929–2010	1955–1979	Later became a U.S. Congressman in North Carolina.	
Sterling Johnson, Jr.			1934–	1956–1967	Later became a senior United States District Judge for the Eastern District of New York.	
Robert Leuci	No image available	Detective	1940–2015	1961–1981	Known for his work exposing corruption in the New York City police department and the criminal justice system.	
Irma Lozada			1959–1984	1980–1984	First female police officer to die in the line of duty in New York City.	
Thomas J. Manton			1932–2006	1955–1960	Later became a U.S. Congressman.	
Barney Martin		Detective	1923–2005		Later became a film and television actor best known for his role as Morty Seinfeld in the television series Seinfeld.	
Suzanne Medicis	No image available	Policewoman	1942–	1972–1997	In 1982, Medicis became the first female to be awarded the Combat Cross.	
Eddie Money (birth/legal name Edward Mahoney)		Police Cadet	1949–2019	1966–1968	Later became a musician.	
Pete Morisi	No image available		1928–2003	1956–1976	Later became a comic book writer and artist.	
Arthur J. Nascarella			1944–		Later became a film and television actor best known for his role as Capo Carlo Gervasi in the television series The Sopranos.	
John F. O'Donohue	No image available	Lieutenant	1946-	1968–1988	Later became a film and television actor best known for his role as Sgt. Eddie Gibson in the television series NYPD Blue.	
Seymour Pine	No image available	Deputy Inspector	1917–2010	1941–1976	Led the police raid on the Stonewall Inn which sparked the Stonewall riots.	
Joe Sánchez			1947–	1973–1985	Police officer whose attempts in 1982 to expose illegal activities being committed by high-ranking NYPD officers resulted in a highly publicized court trial and his dismissal from the force.	
Lloyd Sealy	No image available	Police Commander	1917–1985	1942–1969	First African American police commander of the New York City Police Department.	
Albert Seedman	No image available	Chief Detective	1918–2013	1941–1972	First and so far only Jewish chief of detectives	
Frank Serpico		Detective	1936–	1959–1972	Undercover police officer who testified against police corruption in 1971, and whose life was made into a movie and book.	
Richard X. Slattery			1925–1997	1948–1960	Later became a film and television actor best known for his role as Sgt. John McKenna in The Gallant Men, Captain John Morton in Mister Roberts, and Captain "Buck" Buckner in C.P.O. Sharkey.	
Robert Volpe	No image available	Detective	1942–2006	1963–1983	The first and only member of the NYPD's bureau for art crime, the only bureau of its kind in the country. His son Justin was convicted of the 1997 police assault of Abner Louima.	
Leonard Ernest Weir	No image available		1931–2015	1959–1976	First Black Muslim NYPD officer, whose rise to prominence came in the late 1950s when he founded and served as President of the National Society of Afro-American Policemen. Later became a writer and American social activist.	

== Modern: 1978–present ==
Name	Portrait	Rank	Life	Service years	Comments	Ref.
Eric Adams		Captain	1960–	1984–2006	Former mayor of New York City. Served in the New York Senate from 2006 to 2013.	
Charles M. Barbuti	No image available	Captain	1963–	1986–2011	Former captain of the Bronx District Attorney's police squad. Target of internal investigation in 2009 for theft and destruction of two city cars and was fired the following year.	
Gerard Benderoth	No image available	Patrolman	1969–2017	1995–2005	Later became a professional strongman.	
Michael Buczek	No image available	Patrolman	1964–1988	1985–1988	Shot to death by drug dealers in Manhattan's Washington Heights while answering a domestic call. A Little League baseball, baseball field,school, street and foundation was founded in 1989 named for him.	
Edward Byrne	No image available	Patrolman	1966–1988	1987–1988	Second-generation police officer who was murdered in 1988.	
Kevin P. Clark	No image available	Deputy Chief	1956-	1981–2003	Later became commissioner of the Baltimore Police Department.	
Edward Conlon	No image available	Detective	1965–	1995–2011	Later became a novelist.	
James E. Davis	No image available		1962–2003	1991–1998	Later elected to the New York City Council. He was murdered by fellow politician Othniel Askew at New York City Hall.	
Steve Dillon			1943–	1969–1990	New York Mets pitcher 1963–1964	
Patricia Feerick	No image available	Lieutenant	1960–	1981–1994	Policewoman who was fired for police misconduct.	
Joseph Gray	No image available	Patrolman	1961–	1986–2001	Officer whose murder of three pedestrians in a drunk driving crash was covered up by his superiors.	
Joe Jusko		Patrolman	1959–	1983–1986	Later became a comic book writer and artist.	
Bernard Kerik		New York City Police Commissioner	1955–	1986-1994, 2000-2001	Appointed by Rudy Giuliani from August 2000 to December 2001, served during the 9/11 attacks, later served as acting interior minister of Iraq in 2003 during the Iraq War, and Bush-Cheney 2004 campaign surrogate and advisor. Served 3 years in prison for tax fraud, currently released from prison and was pardoned by President Donald Trump in 2020 and served as a 2020 Trump-Pence campaign advisor.	
Mary Lowery	No image available			1984–	First female helicopter pilot in the NYPD's Aviation Unit.	
Jack Maple	No image available	Deputy Police Commissioner	1952–2001	1994–1996	Served as Deputy Police Commissioner for Crime Control Strategies, he is credited for the creation of CompStat.	
Steven McDonald	No image available	Detective	1957–2017	1984–1986	Officer whose 1986 shooting left him a quadriplegic. He is the most seriously injured NYPD policeman to survive his injury. His son, Conor (b. 1987), who his wife, Patti Ann, was pregnant with during the shooting, became a New York City Police Department officer in 2010.	
Brian McNamee	No image available	Undercover officer	1967–	1990–1993	Later became a baseball coach for the New York Yankees and personal trainer for Roger Clemens.	
Hiram Monserrate		Patrolman	1967–	1988–2000	Later elected to the New York State Senate. He was expelled from the state senate following his conviction for assault in 2009.	
Ed Norris		Deputy commissioner	1960–	1980–2000	Later served as Baltimore Police Commissioner and Superintendent of the Maryland State Police. Norris later pleaded guilty to federal corruption and tax charges.	
Jane Perlov	No image available	Chief of Detectives	1956–	1981–1998	First female Detective Borough Commander in the New York City Police Department.	
Louis N. Scarcella		Detective	1951–	1973–1999	Homicide detective involved in 20 overturned convictions.	
Adrian Schoolcraft	No image available	Patrolman	1976–	2002–2010	Officer who released secretly recorded tapes to The Village Voice showing numerous instances of police misconduct.	
Carol Shaya-Castro	No image available	Patrolwoman	1970–	1991–1995	Policewoman who was fired when she posed for Playboy in 1994.	
Michael Simanowitz	No image available	Auxiliary Deputy Inspector	1971–2017	1995–2017	Elected to the New York State Assembly in 2011.	
Frank Spangenberg	No image available	Lieutenant	1957–	1986–	First person to win more than $100,000 in five days on the game show Jeopardy!.	
Russel Timoshenko	No free image available	Detective (posthumously)	1983–2007	2006–2007	Officer whose 2007 murder resulted in debate over gun control laws in New York City	
James Zadroga	No image available	Detective	1971–2006	1992–2001	First officer whose death from a respiratory disease was attributed to his participation in rescue and recovery operations following the September 11 attacks.	
David Zayas		Patrolman	1962–	1986–2001	Later became a film and television actor best known for his roles as Enrique Morales in the television series Oz and Angel Batista in Dexter.	
