= Francis C. Speight =

American police officer

- Born: May 16, 1816; Ithaca, New York, United States
- Died: March 20, 1877 (aged 60); Manhattan, New York, US
- Resting place: Evergreen Cemetery
- Occupation: Police officer
- Employer: New York City Police Department
- Known for: NYPD police inspector and participant in the Police Riot of 1857 and New York Draft Riots of 1863
- Political party: Whig Party

Francis C. Speight (May 16, 1816 – March 20, 1877) was an American law enforcement officer and police inspector for the New York City Police Department. A noted crimefighter, credited for running out the criminal elements from Manhattan's Eighteenth and Nineteenth Wards in the 1850s, he also took part in the Police Riot of 1857 and New York Draft Riots of 1863. Prior to the outbreak of violence at the Third Avenue draft office, Speight was the only officer to maintain control of his station, the Broadway draft office, during the early hours of the riots.

== Biography ==
=== Early life and career ===
Francis C. Speight was born in Ithaca, New York on May 16, 1816. He first arrived in New York City in 1830 where he was apprenticed as a ship-smith until he was 21 years old. A strong supporter of the Whig Party, he became involved in local politics as a young man and held considerable influence in the Eleventh Ward as a political organizer for the party. This was most evident during the 1840 U.S. presidential election which resulted in the successful election of William Henry Harrison.

In 1845, Speight was appointed to the police force by Alderman Jance D. Oliver and assigned to the Fifteenth Ward. His success against the criminal elements in the area soon earned him promotion to second lieutenant, a position being the modern equivalent to police sergeant. Speight's term of office expired in 1849. With the Whigs not then in power, he was not reappointed and briefly retired to private life.

Shortly thereafter, Speight was appointed Inspector of Customs by then Collector of the Port Hugh Maxwell. He held that position until 1853 and returned to the Municipal police the following year by appointment from the Board of Police Commissioners, then including Mayor Westervelt, City Judge Buebe and Recorder Tillon. On June 3, 1854, Speight received his commission as police captain and was made commander of the recently created Twenty-First Ward, formerly comprising the Eighteenth and Nineteenth Wards.

=== Police captain of the 21st Precinct ===
In the area where the Twenty-First Precinct was located, a particularly violent group of "rowdies" were active and where they based their criminal activities for nearly a decade. Reinforced by Fire Department roughs, these criminals had been a constant source of trouble to the local police. Speight decided to take on the criminal gang and headed police squads sent out at every disturbance caused by them. On one of these occasions, Speight was seriously injured after being struck on the forehead with a blunt object and confined to his bed for several weeks. The scars he received from the injury would remain for the rest of his life. Using aggressive and heavy-handed tactics, Speight directly confronted the street gang and was able to successfully drive them out of the district.

=== Police Riot of 1857 and the New York Draft Riot of 1863 ===
Speight remained in command of the Twenty-First Ward until the formation of the Municipal Police Department in 1857 and turned his office to the new organization. He was among the first senior police officials to join the Metropolitans, Inspector Daniel C. Carpenter and George W. Dilks among others, and he was returned to his former post. Many of these had been former Whigs who now aligned themselves with the New York Republican Party. He also took part in the Police Riot of 1857 assisting in the arrest of Mayor Fernando Wood.

During the early hours of the New York Draft Riot of 1863, upon news of crowds gathering at the Third Avenue draft office and in Central Park, Police Superintendent John Alexander Kennedy dispatched sixty-nine patrolmen under the command of Speight and Sergeants Wade, Wolfe, John Mangin and Robert McCredie to guard the Broadway draft office. No trouble occurred there under Speight's watch and drafting went ahead as scheduled and uninterrupted until noon when it was adjourned for twenty-four hours. The same force under Captain Galen T. Porter had been overwhelmed by the mob and forced to flee from the building after a brief siege when it was set on fire with assistance from members of the Volunteer Engine Company, No. 33 ("The Black Joke"). Speight would be on constant duty throughout the riots.

=== Later years and death ===
On March 20, 1877, Speight died from pneumonia at his home on Eighty-Third Street. Although it was known that Speight had been ill, his sudden death was unexpected and came as a great shock to the police force.

His funeral was held days later at the Church of the Transfiguration, popularly known at the time as "The Little Church Round the Corner", and was attended by members of the Board of Police Commissioners Williams F. Smith, Joel B. Erhardt, Dewitt C. Wheeler and Sidney P. Nichols, ex-Police Commissioners Barr and Voorhis, former Police Superintendent George Washington Matsell, Chief Police Clerk Seth C. Hawley, Superintendent George W. Walling and all police captains including Captain John Mangin of the Yonkers Police Department. Politicians and city officials Charles F. Maclean, John J. Morris, Thomas "Big Tom" Brennan and George Starr were also in attendance.

His body was escorted by aids and personal friends from his home in Carmansville to his church, his pallbearers being Police Inspectors McDermott and Thomas W. Thorne, Captains Petty, Caffrey, Hedden, Bennett, Davis and Mount, and services performed by Rev. George W. Houghton and E. C. Houghton. The hymn "Rock of Ages" was sung by the church choir and a police battalion under Inspector George W. Dilks formed on Twenty-Ninth Street in front of the church. At the service's conclusion, a band played a dirge and the battalion presented arms as the casket was taken to Evergreen Cemetery for burial.
