= Lynching of Robert Mulliner =

Lynching in 1863 in Newburgh, New York, United States

Robert Mulliner was an African American itinerant laborer in Newburgh, New York. On June 21, 1863, Mulliner was violently dragged out from a courthouse jail and was then beaten by a mob of 50 Irishmen who later hanged Mulliner from a tree. Mulliner was jailed after allegedly raping an Irishwoman by the name of Ellen Clark.

== Background ==
=== Enrollment Act ===
The Enrollment Act, also known as the Conscription Act, was established in March 1863. The Confederate Army was the first to resort to a federal draft, known as the Confederate Conscription Acts 1862–1864, as a means to regain the weakened man power lost in the Civil War. The Union followed suit as Abraham Lincoln passed the Enrollment Act to enlist men in order to raise an "effective army." These acts specifically targeted men between the ages of 25 and 35 (if married) or 45 (if unmarried). While the act did not specifically state that black people were exempt from this draft, it only called for the enlistment of "able-bodied white citizens." This in turn further enraged poor whites, particularly Irish-Americans and Irish immigrants. The Irish community viewed this draft as an opportunity for African Americans to take their jobs following the influx of Black migrants in New York, escalating hatred against African Americans.

This hatred was also directed towards the Republican Party, as the Irish community resented the idea that the Republicans and abolitionists prioritized Black people's interests over theirs. This resentment precipitated a skirmish between African American and Irish longshoremen that occurred on April 13, 1863. A Republican newspaper, The Daily Tribune, reported that "A few, unoffending colored laborers on the wharves were suddenly attacked by two or three hundred Irishmen." In contrast, The Herald, a Democratic newspaper, reported that "about a dozen negroes were engaged in discharging cargo..when several white laborers attacked them." The distinct portrayals showcase the underlying frustrations of the Irish being viewed as solely Irish and not white. This marginalization from the Republican Party incentivized Irish support for the Democratic Party, as they felt equal and shared an anti-black and pro-slavery stance.

== Lynching ==
It is unclear as to how Clarke and Mulliner encountered one another. However, multiple accounts of the incident indicate that Clarke had recently moved from County Heath to where Mulliner was living. Mulliner was supposedly living in a black settlement outside of the city and had previously been arrested and jailed for petty crimes such as theft.

On June 19, 1863, Robert Mulliner had been arrested on the charge of raping Clarke. When the news broke out, it enraged the Irish community, and even more so when reportedly, a few Irish mobsters had personally known Clarke's parents in Ireland. This only further influenced the Irish community to come together and seek vengeance against Mulliner.

A few days later on June 21, 1863, a mob of around 50 Irishmen with the support of hundreds of other Irish residents, surrounded the courthouse in which Mulliner was being held. The mob demanded Mulliner be handed over as they ignored the pleas of the two judges, a parish priest by the name of E. J. O'Reilly, and a district attorney to "let the law take its course." While these people attempted to dissuade the mob from killing Mulliner, it was to no avail. The mob eventually overpowered the courthouse by pushing through with axes and sledges. Once inside, the mob forcibly pulled Mulliner out of his cell and dragged him outside while violently beating him. Once outside, Mulliner was hanged on a tree just outside in the courthouse yard for all to see. It is unclear as to how long Mulliner's body was left on the tree, but reportedly "hundreds visited the scene of the lynching the next day."

== Aftermath ==
Mulliner's death provoked many African Americans to flee New York as they feared the current ethnic tensions would only continue to escalate. This lynching further united the Irish community as they pledged to "stand by each other."

Following the death of Mulliner, Republican and Democratic newspapers attempted to pin the blame on one another for influencing the Irish community to commit this lynching. The Daily Tribune placed the blame on Irish-American leaders William McCleary and Cornelius McClean for allowing the lynching to take place. However, the Democratic paper The Daily Telegraph argued that Mulliner's murder would have been justified had he not been arrested beforehand given that it would not go against the law. The editor argued that offenses such as rape are not punished effectively by the state, thus the actions of the mob were valid given the frustrations over "the inadequacy of our laws." The Daily Tribune refuted this by highlighting the fact that this lynching was not correct as it occurred whilst Mulliner was in custody, therefore violating due process.

The Enrollment Act that Abraham Lincoln had passed had not yet taken effect in New York as Democratic politicians who opposed the draft had prevented it from being passed in New York. Different factions of the Democratic Party, known as the Peace or Copperhead faction, believed that the Republican party was at fault for the thousands of casualties in the Civil War. As a result, they created a movement called the Peace Movement in an attempt to prevent the draft selection in New York and maintain the peace. This, however, was unsuccessful as Lincoln ordered troops in New York to advance across the Mason-Dixon line. This left New York unprotected and raised the question of how the draft selection would take place without military presence. The New York City draft riots broke out ujst three weeks after Robert Mulliner's lynching.
