= Dilks =

Dilks is a surname. Notable people with the surname include:

- David Dilks (born 1938), British historian
- Don Dilks (1912–1981), Australian rules footballer
- George W. Dilks (1816–1901), American law enforcement officer and police inspector
