= Robert Nugent (officer) =

Irish-born American U.S. Army officer

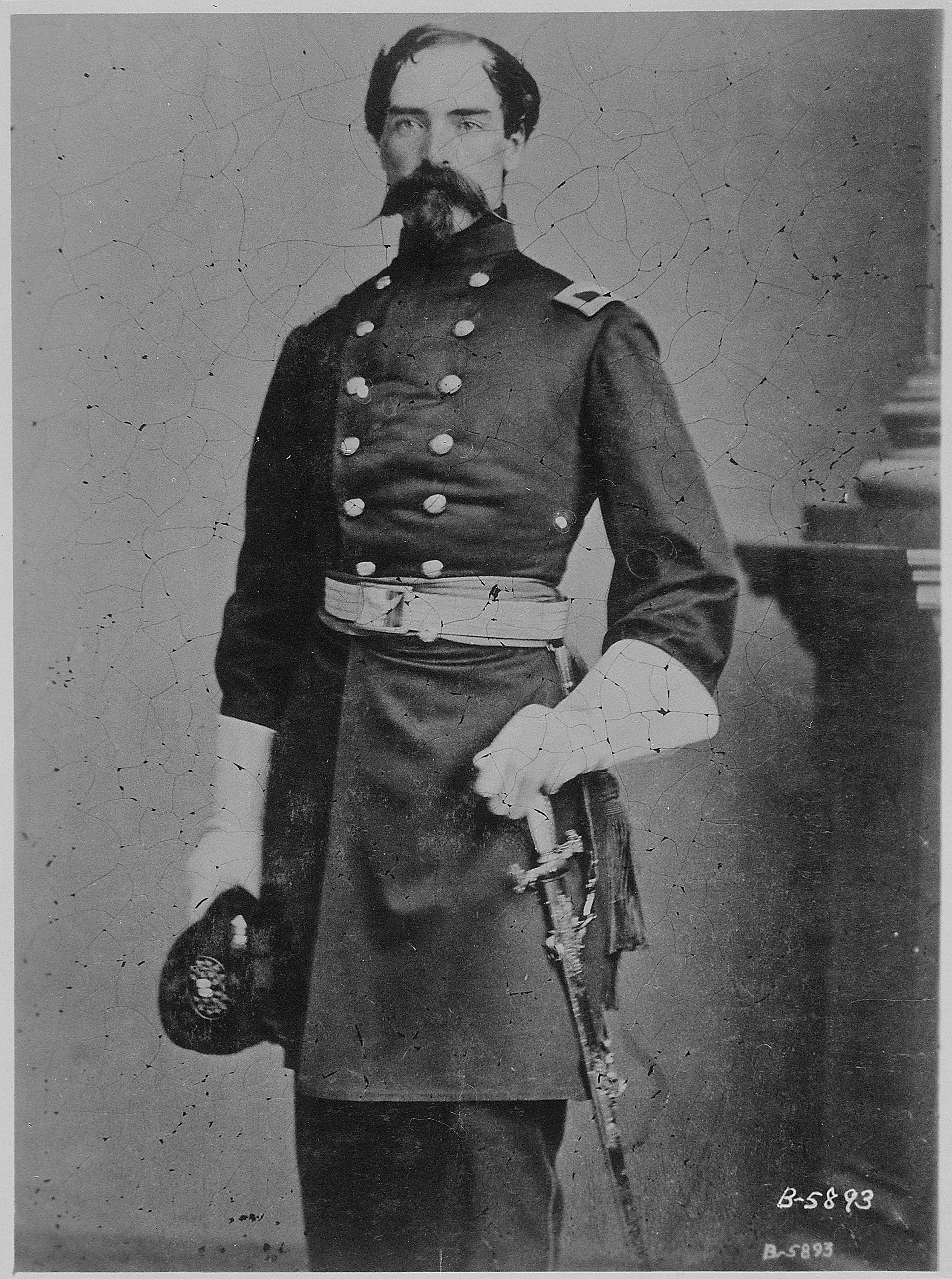
- Born: July 27, 1824; Kilkeel, County Down, Ireland
- Died: June 20, 1901 (aged 76); Brooklyn, New York, U.S.
- Burial place: Cypress Hills National Cemetery
- Military career
- Allegiance: United States of America; Union
- Branch: Union Army
- Service years: 1861–1879
- Rank: Major, USA; Colonel, USV; Brevet Brigadier General
- Units: 13th U.S. Infantry Regiment; 24th U.S. Infantry Regiment
- Commands: 69th New York Infantry; Irish Brigade
- Conflicts: American Civil War; New York Draft Riots; American Indian Wars

Brigadier General Robert Nugent (July 27, 1824 – June 20, 1901) was an Irish-born American U.S. Army officer during the American Civil War and the Indian Wars.

== Early life ==
Robert Nugent was born on July 27, 1824 in Kilkeel, County Down, Ireland. He was the son of Robert Nugent and his wife Jane (Moore) Nugent, who were Presbyterians. He left Ireland to come to New York City around 1842.

== Civil War service ==
Nugent joined the New York National Guard on April 20, 1861 and was commissioned as a lieutenant colonel. He served with the 69th New York Infantry Regiment, from its days as a militia unit and into its incorporation into the Union Army at the start of the war, and was one of its senior officers at the First Battle of Bull Run.

When the unit was originally mustered out of service, the 90-day enlistment terms having expired, Nugent accepted a commission as a captain in the regular army. He was immediately assigned to the 13th Infantry Regiment at the personal request of its commanding officer, Colonel William Tecumseh Sherman. Taking a leave of absence to return to New York, he assisted Thomas Francis Meagher in organizing the Irish Brigade. The newly re-formed 69th Infantry Regiment was the first unit assigned to the Irish Brigade; as its colonel, Nugent led the "Fighting 69th" at the Battles of Fair Oaks, Gaines Mill, Savage Station, White Oak Swamp, Glendale, and Malvern Hill.

Nugent was shot in the stomach at the Battle of Fredericksburg and was eventually forced to resign his command. The US War Department appointed him acting assistant provost marshal for the southern district of New York, which included New York City and Long Island. It was thought that, as an Irishman and Democrat, his appointment would assure the Irish-American population that conscription efforts would be carried out fairly. The Irish-American, a popular Irish-language newspaper, wrote that the selection was a "wise and deservedly popular one". He did encounter resistance from city officials wanting him to remain uninvolved, but by mid-June he had reported to his superior officer, provost marshal general Colonel James Fry, that conscription efforts were "nearing completion without serious incident".

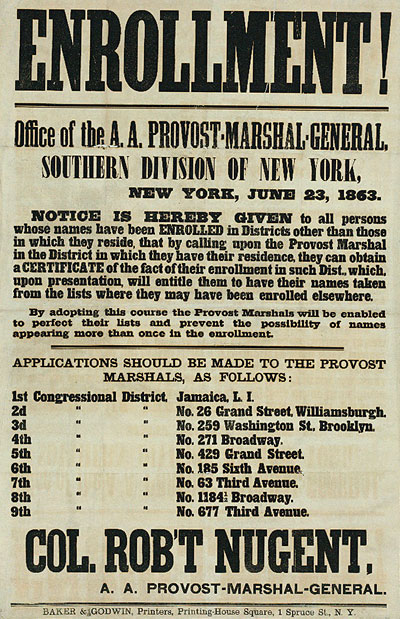
New York enrollment poster June 23, 1863, a mere twenty days before the Draft Riots broke out.

Understanding the seriousness of the situation, he attempted to keep the draft selections quiet and in isolated parts of the city. In Manhattan, however, lotteries were held in the heart of Irish tenement and shanty neighborhoods where the draft was most opposed.

In the ensuing New York Draft Riots, Nugent took command of troops and attempted to defend the city against the rioters. Despite the cancellation of the draft, the riots continued for almost a week. His home on West 86th Street was looted and burned by the rioters during that time, his wife and children barely escaping from their home. Rioters broke into his house, destroyed furniture, and slashed paintings of Nugent and Meagher, although Brigadier General Michael Corcoran's was left untouched.

On October 28, he was relieved of his post and succeeded by General William Hayes. Returning to active duty, he assumed command of the Irish Brigade in December 1863, shortly after Corcoran's death, and was present at the Battle of Spotsylvania and the Petersburg and Appomattox Campaigns. As its last commanding officer, he and the Irish Brigade also marched in the victory parade held in Washington, D.C. following Lee's surrender at Appomattox Courthouse.

== Later years ==
Nugent was brevetted Brigadier General for distinguished leadership of the 69th Regiment on March 13, 1865. The veterans of the Irish Brigade were honorably discharged and mustered out three months later; Nugent remained in the regular US Army for the next twenty years and was a formidable "Indian fighter" during the Great Plains Wars with the 13th and 24th Infantry Regiments. In 1879, he retired at the rank of major and resided in New York, where he was involved in the Grand Army of the Republic and the War Veterans' Association of the 7th Regiment, and an honorary member of The Old Guard.

== Death ==
He became ill in his old age owing to complications arising from his wounds suffered at Fredericksburg, and remained bedridden for two months before his death at the age of 76 on June 20, 1901, at his McDonough Street home in Brooklyn. In accordance with his last wishes, he was buried at Cypress Hills National Cemetery.
