= Charles Stuart Fall =

American soldier

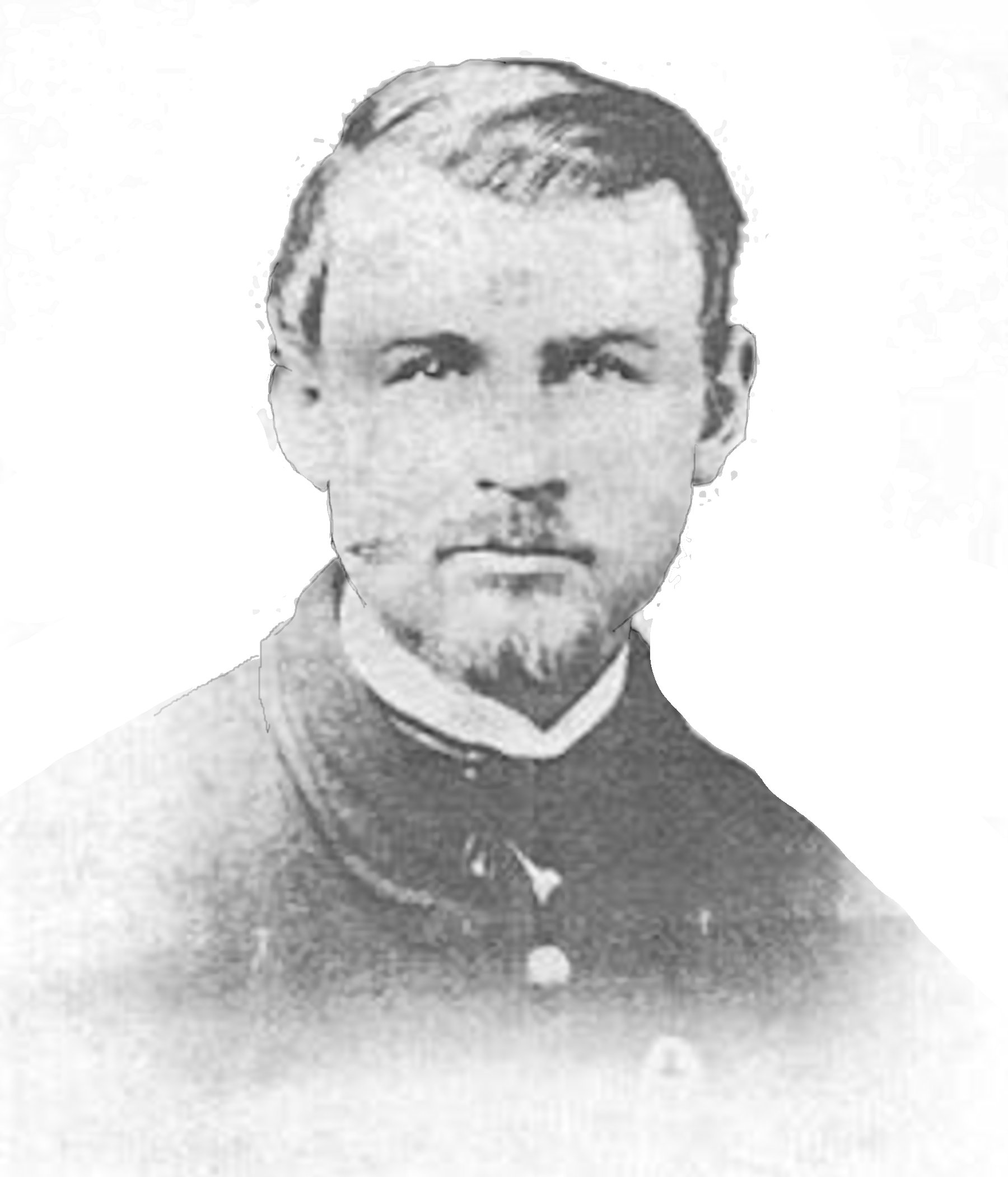
- Medal of Honor winner Charles Stuart Fall
- Born: November 12, 1840; Noble County, Indiana, US
- Died: June 4, 1918 (aged 77); California, US
- Burial place: Odd Fellows Cemetery
- Military career
- Allegiance: United States of America
- Branch: United States Army
- Rank: Sergeant
- Units: Company E, 26th Michigan Volunteer Infantry Regiment
- Conflicts: Battle of Spotsylvania Court House
- Awards: Medal of Honor

Sergeant Charles Stuart Fall (November 12, 1840 – June 4, 1918) was an American soldier who fought in the American Civil War. Fall received the United States' highest award for bravery during combat, the Medal of Honor, for his action during the Battle of Spotsylvania Court House in Virginia on May 12, 1864. He was honored with the award on May 13, 1899.

== Biography ==
Fall was born in Noble County, Indiana, on November 12, 1840. He enlisted into the 26th Michigan Infantry. He died on June 4, 1918, and his remains are interred at Odd Fellows Cemetery in California.

== Medal of Honor citation ==
Was one of the first to mount the Confederate works, where he bayoneted two of the enemy and captured a Confederate flag, but threw it away to continue the pursuit of the enemy.

== See also ==
- List of American Civil War Medal of Honor recipients: A–F
