= Enrollment Act =

Military draft legislation of the American Civil War

- Long title: An Act for enrolling and calling out the national Forces, and for other Purposes
- Nicknames: Civil War Military Draft Act
- Enacted by: the 37th United States Congress
- Effective: March 3, 1863

Citations
- Statutes at Large: 12 Stat. 731

Legislative history
- Introduced in the Senate as S. 511; Passed the Senate on February 16, 1863 (13-24); Passed the House on February 23, 1863 (61-60) with amendment; House agreed to House amendment on February 25, 1863 (115-49) with further amendment; Senate agreed to House amendment on February 28, 1863 (11–35); Signed into law by President Abraham Lincoln on March 3, 1863

Major amendments
- 1. Enrollment Act of 1864 (13 Stat. 6); 2. Enrollment Act of 1865 (13 Stat. 487)

The Enrollment Act of 1863 (12 Stat. 731, enacted March 3, 1863) also known as the Civil War Military Draft Act, was an Act passed by the United States Congress during the American Civil War to provide fresh manpower for the Union Army. The Act was the first genuine national conscription law. The law required the enrollment of every male citizen and those immigrants who had filed for citizenship, between 20 and 45 years of age, unless exempted by the Act. The Act replaced the Militia Act of 1862.

It set up under the Union Army an elaborate machine for enrolling and drafting men for conscription. Quotas were assigned in each state, and each congressional district, with deficiencies in volunteers being met by conscription.

In several cities, including New York City, enforcement of the act sparked civil unrest as the war dragged on, leading to the New York City draft riots on July 13–16, 1863.

== Organization ==
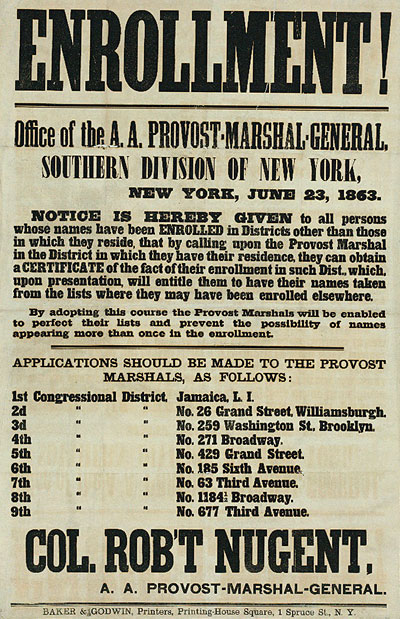
Recruiting poster from New York City printed by Baker & Godwin, June 23, 1863

The Provost Marshal General was recreated to administer the national implementation of the Enrollment Act. James Barnet Fry was appointed to the position and answered directly to Secretary of War Edwin Stanton. Beneath Fry were the State Acting Assistant Provost Marshal Generals. The State Provost Marshal Generals were not authorized by the Enrollment Act but were appointed personally by Fry to attend to matters in each individual state. New York and Pennsylvania were the only states that had more than one State Acting Assistant Marshal General; New York had three and Pennsylvania had two. Each state was divided along district lines with each district under the jurisdiction of an enrollment board.

Enrollment boards were headed by a district provost marshal and also included a surgeon and a commissioner. Each board employed clerks, deputies, and special agents as needed. They were divided into sub-districts along ward (in cities) and township (in rural areas) lines. In each sub-district a census was conducted by an enrollment officer to document every man eligible for the draft in the sub-district.

== Criticism ==
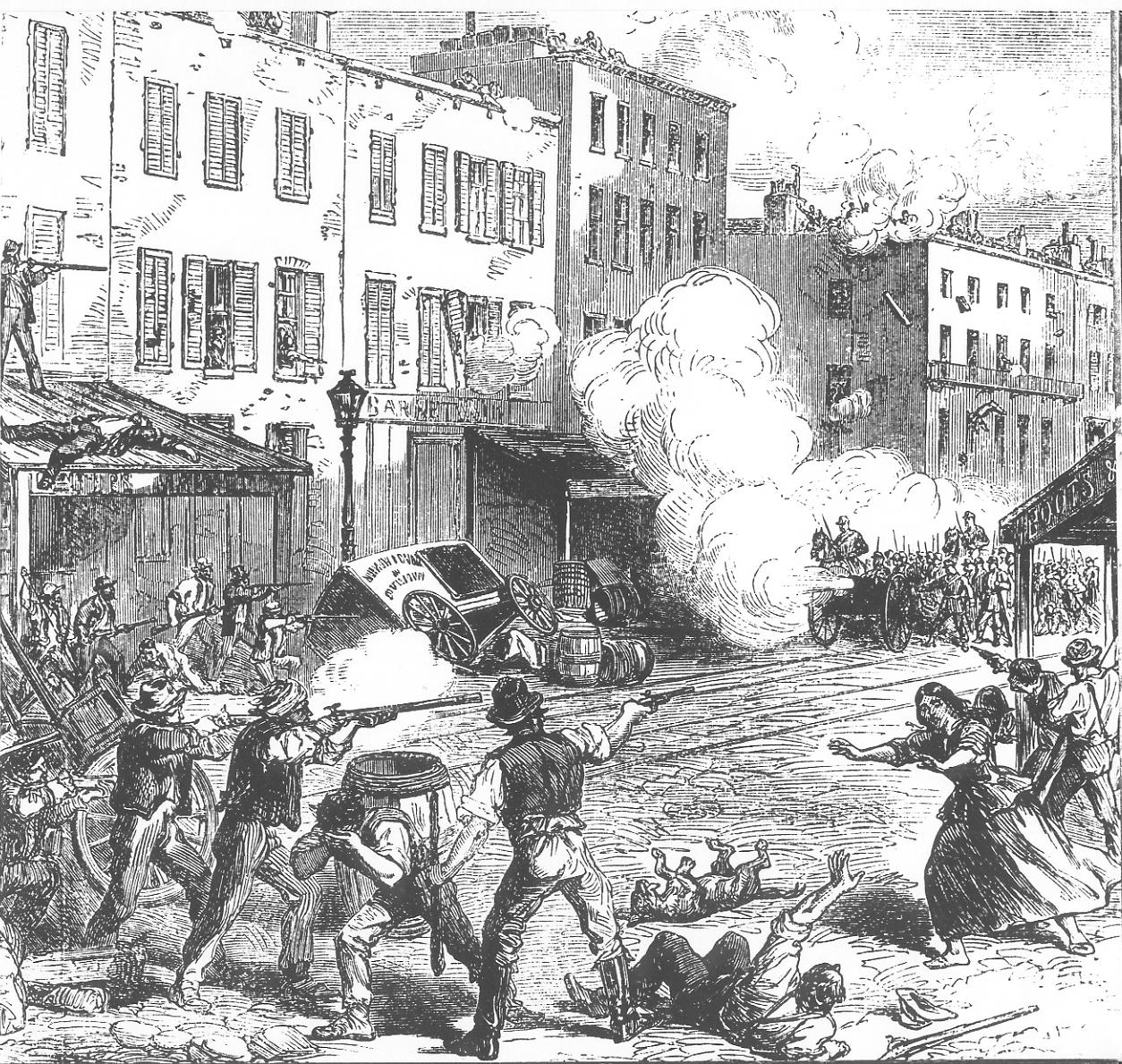
Rioters and Federal troops clash as a result of the 1863 Enrollment Act

The policies of substitution and commutation were controversial practices that allowed drafted citizens to opt out of service by either furnishing a suitable substitute to take their place or paying $300. Both provisions were created to soften the effect of the draft on pacifists, the anti-draft movement, and the propertied classes. The result, however, was general public resentment of both policies. The two practices were major points of contention among the general public and led directly to the slogan "rich man's war, poor man's fight."

=== Substitution ===
Substitutions were available throughout the war. The problem with substitution was that it provided substitutes with powerful incentives to desert soon after enlisting. Career "jumpers" made a living by enlisting as substitutes, collecting their compensation, deserting before their units were dispatched to the front, and repeating the process. The problem was well known to the military commanders who regularly saw the same recruits. In addition, troops furnished by substitution were considered to be of an inferior quality in comparison to regulars and volunteers.

=== Commutation ===
Commutation (paying $300 to escape the draft, roughly the equivalent of $5,000 earned by an unskilled worker in 2018) was created in an effort to keep substitution prices low. If commutation were not instated, the price of a substitute would have quickly soared past $300.

Also, commutation was intended to raise money for the war effort. While commutation raised war funds, it was often a criticism of the draft that it was better at raising money than troops. The rationalization for commutation was that unwilling troops were ineffective and so the government might as well extract funds from the unwilling rather than get poor service. It was one of the most hated policies of the war.

== Amendments ==
=== 1864 amendment ===
Section 5 of the Enrollment Act of 1864 limited the length of an exemption from the draft by payment of the commutation fee to one year, after which those drafted were required to serve or to furnish a substitute.

=== 1865 amendment ===
Section 21 of the Enrollment Act of 1865 (13 Stat. 490, passed on March 3, 1865), imposed denationalization (loss of citizenship) as a penalty for draft evasion or desertion. In Afroyim v. Rusk (1967), Justice John Marshall Harlan II's dissent mentioned the Enrollment Act of 1865 as an example of a law in which citizenship could be revoked without a person's consent and that the Congress regarded as constitutional.

== See also ==
- Gangs of New York – a film depicting the riots the Act caused in New York City
- Conscription in the United States

== Bibliography ==
- Berlin, Ira (1982). The Black Military Experience. CUP Archive.
- Delehant, John W. (December 1967). "A Judicial Revisitation Finds Kneedler v. Lane Not So 'Amazing'". ABA Journal. 53: 1132.
- Matteo, Henry S. (1997). Denationalization V. "the Right to Have Rights": The Standard of Intent in Citizenship Loss. University Press of America.
- Murdock, Eugene C. (1971). One Million Men: The Civil War Draft in the North.
- Murdock, Eugene C. (1967). Patriotism Limited 1862–1865: The Civil War Draft and the Bounty System.
