= 152nd New York Infantry Regiment =

- Active: October 14, 1862 - June 13, 1865
- Country: United States
- Allegiance: Union
- Branch: Infantry
- Engagements: Siege of Suffolk; New York City Draft Riots; Mine Run Campaign; Battle of the Wilderness; Battle of Spotsylvania Court House; Battle of Totopotomoy Creek; Battle of Cold Harbor; Siege of Petersburg; Second Battle of Petersburg; Battle of Jerusalem Plank Road; Second Battle of Deep Bottom; Second Battle of Ream's Station; Appomattox Campaign; Battle of Sailor's Creek; Battle of Appomattox Court House

The 152nd New York Infantry Regiment was an infantry regiment in the Union Army during the American Civil War.

== Service ==
The 152nd New York Infantry was organized at Mohawk, New York, and mustered in for three years service on October 14, 1862, under the command of Colonel Leonard Boyer.

Captain David Hill enlisted in the 152nd Regiment, New York Volunteers, in October 1862, and rose to the rank of Captain by January 1863. He participated in battles from Fredericksburg until the end of the war, but was discharged and mustered out in May 1864 due to a wound sustained at the Battle of Spotsylvania. The document highlights his extraordinary bravery during Hancock's charge at Spotsylvania, where he single-handedly captured over 30 Confederate soldiers in a rifle pit and later, after all higher officers were disabled, led another advance with the regimental flag until he was shot in the hand. The sword he carried, with the bullet still embedded in the hilt, serves as a testament to his courage. Additionally, Captain Hill commanded the first boatload of troops that landed during the New York draft riots.

The regiment was attached to Provisional Brigade, Abercrombie's Division, Defenses of Washington, to February 1863. District of Washington, XXII Corps, to April 1863. 1st Brigade, 1st Division, VII Corps, Department of Virginia, to July 1863. Department of the East to October 1863. 1st Brigade, 2nd Division, II Corps, Army of the Potomac, to March 1864. 2nd Brigade, 2nd Division, II Corps, to June 1864. 1st Brigade, 2nd Division, II Corps, to June 1865.

The 152nd New York Infantry mustered out of service at Washington, D.C., on June 13, 1865.

== Detailed service ==
Left New York for Washington, D.C., October 25, 1862. Duty in the defenses of Washington, D.C., until April 1863. Ordered to Suffolk, Virginia, April 18. Siege of Suffolk April 20-May 4. Dix's Peninsula Campaign June 24 – July 7. Expedition from White House to Bottom's Bridge July 1–7. Ordered to New York July 12. Duty at New York City July 16 to October 18. Rejoined Army of the Potomac in the field October 24. Advance to line of the Rappahannock November 7–8. Mine Run Campaign November 26 – December 2. Demonstration on the Rapidan February 6–7, 1864. Morton's Ford February 6–7. At and near Stevensburg until May. Campaign from the Rapidan to the James May 3 – June 15. Battles of the Wilderness May 5–7; Laurel Hill May 8; Spotsylvania May 8–12; Po River May 10; Spotsylvania Court House May 12–21. Assault on the Salient, "Bloody Angle," May 12. North Anna River May 23–26. On line of the Pamunkey May 26–28. Totopotomoy May 28–31. Cold Harbor June 1–12. Before Petersburg June 16–18. Siege of Petersburg June 16, 1864, to April 2, 1865. Jerusalem Plank Road, Weldon Railroad, June 22–23, 1864. Demonstration north of the James July 27–29. Deep Bottom July 27–28. Demonstration north of the James August 13–20. Strawberry Plains, Deep Bottom, August 14–18. Ream's Station August 25. Boydton Plank Road, Hatcher's Run, October 27–28. Dabney's Mills, Hatcher's Run, February 5–7, 1865. Watkins' House March 25. Appomattox Campaign March 28 – April 9. Boydton Road and White Oak Ridge March 29–31. Crow's House March 31. Fall of Petersburg April 2. Pursuit of Lee April 3–9. Sailor's Creek April 6. High Bridge, Farmville, April 7. Appomattox Court House April 9. Surrender of Lee and his army. At Burkesville until May 2. March to Washington, D.C., May 2–12. Grand Review of the Armies May 23.

== Casualties ==
The regiment lost a total of 161 men during service. 3 officers and 66 enlisted men were killed or mortally wounded, and 1 officer and 91 enlisted men died of disease.

== Commanders ==
- Colonel Leonard Boyer
- Colonel Alonzo Ferguson
- Colonel George W. Thompson
- Colonel James E. Curtis
- Major Timothy O'Brien – commanded at the Battle of Mine Run
- Major James E. Curtiss – commanded during the Appomattox Campaign

== See also ==
- List of New York Civil War regiments
- New York in the Civil War
