= Thomas S. Steers =

American law enforcement officer and police captain

- Born: 1804; New York City, New York, United States
- Died: June 13, 1884 (aged 80); Brooklyn, New York
- Occupation: Police captain
- Employer: New York City Police Department
- Known for: NYPD police captain who participated in the Draft Riot of 1863
- Relatives: Henry V. Steers, son

Thomas S. Steers (1804 – June 13, 1884) was an American law enforcement officer and police captain of the New York City Police Department during the mid-to late 19th century. He was one of the earliest police officials appointed to the Metropolitan police force serving for over twenty years until his retirement in 1870. Steers also played a prominent role in the Draft Riot of 1863. He was the father of Captain Henry V. Steers, longtime precinct captain of the Twenty-Fifth Precinct located at New York City Hall.

== Biography ==
Thomas S. Steers was born in New York City, New York, in 1804. He was educated in public schools and entered the police force in 1848. Working his way up the ranks, he eventually became a police captain in 1857 and was assigned to head the Thirteenth Precinct where he remained for several years.

In the early hours of the Draft Riot of 1863, Steers was one of several senior officers to lead groups to confront rioters. That afternoon at about 1:00 pm, he and a small police squad made a desperate stand at 35th Street to try to halt the mob but were overwhelmed by the rioters' far larger numbers and his men fled in disorder.

Steers spent his later career being transferred to several other precincts, reportedly "always doing good wherever he was", before finally retiring from active service in 1870. He lived with his family during his last years and died at the home of his daughter in Brooklyn on the morning of June 13, 1884. His funeral was held almost a week later.
