= John Cameron (police officer) =

American law enforcement officer and police captain

- Born: September 30, 1807; Norwalk, Connecticut, United States
- Died: January 1, 1873 (aged 65); Manhattan, New York, US
- Occupation: Police captain
- Known for: NYPD police captain who organized the defense of several key buildings in Manhattan including the State Armory and the Union Steam Works.
- Children: 1 daughter

John Cameron (September 30, 1807 – January 1, 1873) was an American law enforcement officer and police captain with the New York City Police Department. Although best remembered for his performance during the New York Draft Riots, Cameron was one of the most prominent senior police officials during the post-American Civil War era and the oldest serving police officer at the time of his death in 1873.

== Biography ==
John Cameron was born in Norwalk, Connecticut on September 30, 1807. He was appointed to a position on the police force by Mayor James Harper and, upon the organization of the Metropolitan Police Department in 1857, he became captain of the Seventh Precinct. He remained there for nearly four years until the double murder committed by Charles Jefferds in 1860 prompted his transfer to the Twenty-Second Street Police Station. During the New York Draft Riots in 1863, although his stationhouse was burned down by a mob, he was one of the few police captains able to mount a defense against the rioters. He organized the defense of several key buildings in Manhattan including the State Armory and the Union Steam Works, the latter being guarded by Sergeant Francis J. Banfield and a police squad of 20 officers. He similarly led police patrols against rioters during the New York Orange Riot of 1871.

He remained at the Twenty-Second Precinct for 12 of his 25 years of service and "distinguished himself by his strict impartiality in the discharge of his duties". He had been in charge of the Eighteenth Precinct when, on the morning of January 1, 1873, Cameron started out from the station house on his way to Central Office with the morning returns and collapsed while trying to overtake a trolley car at the corner of Twenty-Second Street and Third Avenue. Cameron was brought to a nearby drugstore by an Officer Green while doctors were sent for, but Cameron died before help could arrive. The physicians, Dr. White and Dr. Fresch, stated that he had died of a heart attack. Cameron was the third prominent police official, after Inspectors Daniel C. Carpenter and James Leonard, to die in similar circumstances.

Upon his death, Cameron's brother was immediately contacted by telegraph and arrived in the city that evening. Cameron's body was removed to his home on Cannon Street until the day of his funeral when it was escorted by a police detail to St. Paul's Methodist Episcopal Church. The services were attended by a large group of officers and officials as well as delegations from the Freemasons, the Alma Lodge (U.D.), the Puritan Lodge, F.A.M. and Morton Commandery were present. The Knights Templar assumed charge of his remains while Masonic services were performed. Survived by his wife and daughter, his family received $1,000 as a member of the Police Mutual Benefit Society and the Police Mutual Aid Association.
