= 20th Independent Battery, New York Volunteer Artillery =

- Active: 1862 to July 31, 1865
- Disbanded: July 31, 1865
- Country: United States
- Allegiance: Union
- Branch: Union Army
- Type: Artillery
- Role: Garrison duty
- Nickname: Anthon's Battalion
- Engagements: New York Draft Riots

Commanders
- Captain: Gilbert S. Coddington. B. Franklin Ryer

The 20th Independent Battery, New York Volunteer Artillery, also known as "Anthon's Battalion," was an artillery battery that served with the Union Army during the American Civil War. Organized in New York City in 1862, the regiment spent the rest of its service performing guard duty at the New York Harbor, while a section of the battery was sent to quell the New York Draft Riots.

== Service ==
The battery was organized in New York City on December 27, 1862, and mustered into service for three years' service. The battery was recruited from the counties of New York and Kings.

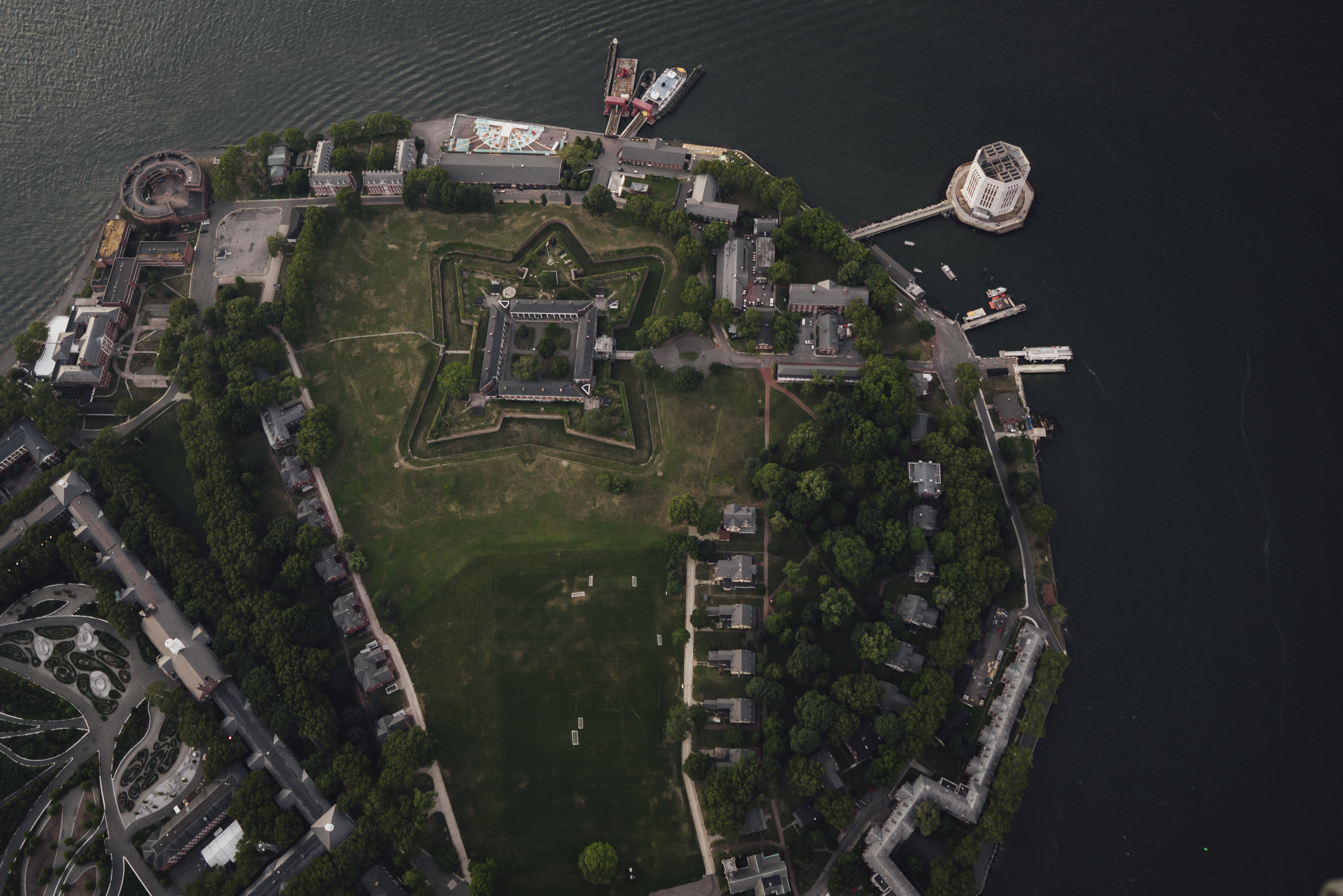
Aerial View of Fort Columbus (Now called Fort Jay) on Governor's Island, New York City,

The battery spent its term of service performing garrison duty at Forts Schuyler and Columbus at New York Harbor. While they were stationed there, a section of the battery went on to quell the New York Draft Riots in July 1863.

The battery was mustered out of service on July 31, 1865, at New York City.The battery lost 6 men to disease.

== Commanders ==
- Captain Gilbert S. Coddington. (Resigned)
- Captain B. Franklin Ryer

== See also ==
- List of New York Civil War regiments
- New York in the American Civil War

== External ==
- Civil War Archive
