= Galen Porter =

Galen T. Porter
- Born: 1807; Braintree, Massachusetts, United States
- Died: March 30, 1883 (aged 76); Manhattan, New York, US
- Occupation: Police officer
- Employer: New York City Police Department
- Known for: NYPD police captain who participated in the New York Draft Riots.

Galen T. Porter (1807 – March 30, 1883) was an American law enforcement officer and police captain in the New York City Police Department. One of the senior police commanders during the New York Draft Riots, he helped defend the Third Avenue draft office and later headed the Nineteenth Precinct.

== Biography ==
Galen Porter was born in Braintree, Massachusetts in 1807. He moved with his family to New York City as a child and later worked in the boot and shoe trade before joining the Metropolitan Police Department in 1849. He was promoted to police captain soon afterwards and appointed to head the old Twelfth Precinct where he remained until the start of the New York Draft Riots in 1863.

In the first hours of rioting, Porter was one of the first officers dispatched to confront the mobs. A half-hour after rioters first began leaving Central Park, Superintendent John Alexander Kennedy directed Porter to send 60 officers to Third Avenue and reinforce patrolmen being threatened there. Fifty members of the Invalid Corps also joined Porter's squad. By the time of Porter's arrival however, the crowd outside the Third Avenue draft office becoming increasingly violent and "packing the avenue for half a dozen blocks on either side of Forty-Sixth Street". Horse carts and private carriages were blocked from passing through the avenue. Those that attempted to do so were stopped, their horses unhitched, and the drivers and passengers chased away. "No Draft" signs also began appearing at various points on the street. Porter's squad were slowly forced back by the sheer size of the crowd and, by 10:00 am, they "stood with drawn clubs and their backs to the building".

The appearance of the Volunteer Engine Company No. 33, popularly known as the "Black Joke", prompted its members to address the crowd. One of the volunteers had recently been selected in the Saturday draft lottery, although firemen had been exempt from draft into the militia. According to Herbert Asbury's fictionalized history, The Gangs of New York, the volunteer firemen announced their intention of "smashing the wheel and destroying the records". As the firemen were encouraging the crowd to join them, someone fired a pistol and the engine company led the crowd against the police. Police attempted to hold their ground, however they were quickly overwhelmed by the rioters and Porter ordered a retreat into the building. Once inside however, Porter and his men were unable to lock and barricade the doors. The firemen were able to force their way into the building, followed by the rest of the mob armed with firearms and clubs, and began destroying the draft office. The police briefly attempted to hold off the rioters in the hallways before fleeing into an alley and then to Second Avenue. Provost Marshal Charles E. Jenkins was able to save the draft records due to their efforts.

Porter commanded the Nineteenth Precinct for the duration of the riot. On Wednesday morning, he led his command in a tour through the Thirteenth and Seventeenth Wards as well as recovering the body of a negro who had been killed at Seventh Avenue and Thirty-Second Street. He and the officers of the Nineteenth were the first to confront the rioters and would be involved nearly every major engagement during the riot. Porter resigned a year or two following the riots. He lived in retirement until his death from pneumonia at his East 129th Street home on March 30, 1883.
