= John F. Dickson =

American public servant, law enforcement officer and police captain

- Born: November 30, 1821; New York City, United States
- Died: September 12, 1880 (aged 58); Manhattan, New York, United States
- Occupation: Police officer
- Employer: New York City Police Department
- Known for: Police captain who co-led a police squad with drillmaster Theron S. Copeland during the New York Draft Riots; was also the longtime head of the Tombs Police Court

John F. Dickson (November 30, 1821 – September 12, 1880) was an American public servant, law enforcement officer and police captain with the New York City Police Department. He and drillmaster Theron S. Copeland led a police squad during the New York Draft Riots which were dispatched against rioters attacking African Americans. He was also the longtime head of the Tombs Police Court and one of the oldest serving police officers on the police force at the time of his death in 1880.

== Biography ==
John F. Dickson was born in New York City on November 30, 1821. He worked as a printer before his appointment the police force in 1850 and, upon the organization of the Metropolitan Police Department in 1857, joined the force as acting Captain of the Sixth Precinct. He remained in command of the precinct until Captain Joseph Dowling, who had formerly sided with Mayor Fernando Wood and the Municipal police force during the Police Riot of 1857, replaced Dickson upon joining the Metropolitan police in 1859. Relegated to the rank of police sergeant, he served under noted police captains John Jourdan, Thomas J. Kennedy and Edward Walsh.

As a Republican serving in the Tammany Hall-dominated Sixth Ward, his career suffered due to his political views especially while under Jourdan. Tensions between the two men were further increased when Dickson beat out Jourdan as precinct captain of the Twenty-Eighth Precinct on May 1, 1860. During the New York Draft Riots in 1863, he and drillmaster Theron S. Copeland led a police detachment against rioters attacking African Americans at Washington and LeRoy Streets. He sent men to recover the bodies of victims who had been killed during the riots, most notably, dispersing a mob on Clarkson Street to cut down the body of William Jones who had been hanged to a tree and tortured. Dickson remained at the precinct until July 11, 1869, when he was transferred to the Eleventh Precinct. Upon his departure, Dickson was presented with a house and a small lot in Harlem by local businessmen to show their appreciation for his years of diligent service in the area.

In the spring of 1870, Dickson became a police superintendent. Shortly after his transfer from the Eleventh to the Thirty-First Precinct however, he suddenly began come under considerable harassment and intentional obstruction of his duties. This would last from his arrival on July 28 until his resignation on August 20, 1870. He was immediately reappointed to a patrolman and assigned to the detective squad. However, his treatment by the police service had "broken his spirit, and his old energy was gone". He suffered from severe depression which greatly affected his health during his later years. When Inspector Thomas F. Byrnes became head of the detective squad, he was sent to the Tombs Police Court where he remained for the rest of his career.

Dickson died of stomach cancer at his Stuyvesant Street home on September 12, 1880, and his funeral held at St. Ann's Roman Catholic Church. At the time of his death he was one of the oldest officers still active in the NYPD.
