= 26th Michigan Infantry Regiment =

- Michigan state flag
- Active: December 12, 1862, to June 4, 1865
- Country: United States
- Allegiance: Union
- Branch: Infantry
- Engagements: New York City Draft Riots; Battle of the Wilderness; Battle of Spotsylvania Court House; Battle of Cold Harbor; Siege of Petersburg; Battle of Sailor's Creek; Appomattox Campaign

The 26th Michigan Infantry Regiment was an infantry regiment that served in the Union Army during the American Civil War.

== Service ==
The 26th Michigan Infantry was mustered into Federal service at Jackson, Michigan, on December 12, 1862. The regiment participated in the suppression of the New York Draft Riots in July, 1863.

The regiment was mustered out of service on June 4, 1865.

== Total strength and casualties ==
The regiment suffered three officers and 115 enlisted men killed in action or mortally wounded and three officers and 159 enlisted men who died of disease, for a total of 280 fatalities.

== Commanders ==
- Colonel Judson S. Farrar
- Colonel Henry Horatio Wells

== See also ==
- List of Michigan Civil War Units
- Michigan in the American Civil War
