= James Z. Bogart =

American law enforcement officer and police captain

- Born: March 26, 1821; United States
- Died: March 28, 1881 (aged 60); New York City, New York
- Occupation: Police officer
- Employer: New York City Police Department
- Known for: NYPD police captain who led the Broadway Squad during the New York Draft Riots.

James Z. Bogart (March 26, 1821 – March 28, 1881) was an American law enforcement officer and police captain with the New York City Police Department. A member of the old Municipal police force, he joined the Metropolitan Police Department upon its formation in 1857. From his official appointment on April 23, 1857, Bogart rose from roundsman, to sergeant and finally captain within only a few years. He served in a number of important posts throughout the city, including the Twelfth, Twenty-Second and Thirty-First Precincts.

During the New York Draft Riots in 1863, Bogart led a police force made up of reserve members from the Thirty-First Precinct and the Broadway Squad against rioters looting the home of J.S. Gibbons, a cousin of New York Tribune editor Horace Greeley, at Lamartine Place near Eighth Avenue and Twenty-Ninth Street. After a half hour of fierce fighting, particularly among the female rioters, the battle was broken up by a detachment of soldiers who fired a volley into the crowd striking police and rioters alike. One patrolman was killed and two were seriously wounded by the attack.

He was also the precinct captain of Twenty-Second station at the time of his retirement on June 6, 1870. He was given a $1,000 a year pension and placed on the retired list where he would remain for over ten years. He ran a fish stand on Third Avenue until his death at East One Hundred and Twelfth Street on the night of March 28, 1881, only two days after his 60th birthday.
