= Robert H. Holmes =

Murdered American police officer (1888–1917)

- Born: Robert Henry Holmes; July 25, 1888; Charleston, South Carolina, U.S.
- Died: August 6, 1917 (aged 29)
- Cause of death: Homicide by shooting
- Occupation: Police officer

Robert Henry Holmes (July 25, 1888 – August 6, 1917) was the first NYPD African-American officer to die in the line of duty.

Born in Charleston, South Carolina, Holmes was appointed as an NYPD police officer on August 25, 1913. He was assigned to the 38th precinct in Harlem. Officer Holmes was shot to death while chasing and exchanging gunfire with a burglar.
