= George W. Dilks =

American law enforcement officer and police inspector

- Born: December 16, 1816; New York City
- Died: October 24, 1901 (aged 84); Manhattan, New York
- Resting place: Greenwood Cemetery
- Occupation: Police inspector
- Known for: NYPD police inspector who participated in the Draft Riot of 1863; also involved in the Cunningham-Burdell "bogus baby" case and Alexander T. Stewart bodysnatching case.
- Spouse: Carolina Williams
- Children: 1 son, 4 daughters

George W. Dilks (December 16, 1816 – October 24, 1901) was an American law enforcement officer and police inspector with the New York City Police Department during the mid-to late 19th century. He was a prominent police official during the early years of the Metropolitan Police Department and was one of the senior officers who participated in the Draft Riot of 1863, most notably, by recapturing the Union Steam Works after fierce hand-to-hand fighting.

Dilks was also actively involved in cases concerning counterfeiting, prostitution and missing children. He was an investigating officer during the Cunningham-Burdell "bogus baby" case in 1857, later serving as witness for the prosecution, and the Alexander T. Stewart bodysnatching case in 1878.

== Biography ==
=== Early life and marriage ===
George W. Dilks was born to English immigrant James Dilks in New York City, New York on December 26, 1816. He was descended from a prominent Revolutionary War family, his grandfather being a British Army colonel who later settled in the United States following the war. He was also a relative of English nobleman Sir Charles Dilks and Admiral Sir Thomas Dilks. He was educated in New Brunswick, New Jersey and returned to New York with his family at age 14. They settled in Manhattan, New York and Dilks worked as a printer during his teenage years. His workplace was located on Duane Street, near Broadway, in the same building where the law office of Aaron Burr was, and the two became close friends. He was also personal friends with actor Edwin L. Davenport and later brother-in-law Rev. Dr. Samuel D. Burchard. On July 11, 1843, he married Carolina Williams, the daughter of Robert Williams, at the Thirteenth Street Presbyterian Church by Rev. Dr. Burchard. They would eventually have five children, however only two daughters survived into adulthood.

=== Police career with the NYPD ===
In 1848, Dilks joined the police force under the administration of then Mayor Fernando Wood and appointed as an assistant captain. The next year, he commanded a squad of officers during the Astor Place Riot. He was made a full captain "for bravery and vigilance" in 1853 and given command of the Fifteenth Ward. In 1857, he won praise for his actions against rioting longshoremen, armed with hay-sticks, cart-rungs and clubs, whom he and his men fought in a four-day battle. In 1860, he was appointed a police inspector. During the Draft Riot of 1863, Dilks led a force of two hundred officers into Second Avenue and recaptured the Union Steam Works, then being used as a headquarters and rallying point for rioters along East Side Manhattan, after fierce hand-to-hand fighting. His force, which included all the reserves of the Eighteenth Precinct, was outnumbered against the nearly five hundred rioters inside.

Shortly after the riots, he was offered the position of Police Superintendent but declined not wanting to take the position from then superintendent John Alexander Kennedy. Remaining an inspector, he held this rank until his retirement in 1888.

=== Later years and death ===
Dilks spent his last years as "one of New York's best known citizens" and his 50th wedding anniversary was one of the largest celebrations in the city's history. Of the 150 guests, there were many well-known people from as far away as Kentucky, Ohio and Washington, D.C. in attendance. Chaon Chang Tseng and L. Wing of the New York Chinese Council, Chinese Foreign Minister Tsui Kwo Yin and members of the Chinese delegation from Washington, D.C. Secretary Pung Kwang Yu, Wang Hung Ting, Ho Shen Chee and Yung Kwai were also invited. He was especially held in high regard by the residents of Chinatown, who supported and protected the burgeoning Chinese American community throughout his career, and whose residents "looked upon him as their friend".

He died from natural causes at his West Ninth Street residence on October 24, 1901. A funeral service was held for him three days later at the Church of the Ascension, at Tenth Street and Fifth Avenue, and conducted by members of the Mutual Lodge, Palestine Encampment and Independent Order of Odd Fellows. Reverend Percy S. Grant of the Church of the Ascension and Reverend Walter Buchanan of the Fourth Avenue Presbyterian Church, the Dilks family pastor, also assisted in the ceremony. The funeral cortege was given a police escort, headed by Captain Frederick Martens of the Charles Street Station, from his home to the church.

Many prominent Odd Fellows were in attendance at the service including the officers of the Grand Lodge of the State of New York, Grand Master John P. Kellas, Deputy Grand Master Leon Lewin, Grand Secretary John G. Deubert, Grand Treasurer John T. Bullenkamp, Grand Marshal Joseph Fenner and Grand Herald George Williams. Family services were held the following morning and Dilks was interred at Greenwood Cemetery in a private burial.
