= New York City draft riots =

1863 civil unrest protesting American Civil War conscription

Coordinates: 40°43′N 74°0′W

New York City Draft Riots of 1863
- Part of Opposition to the American Civil War
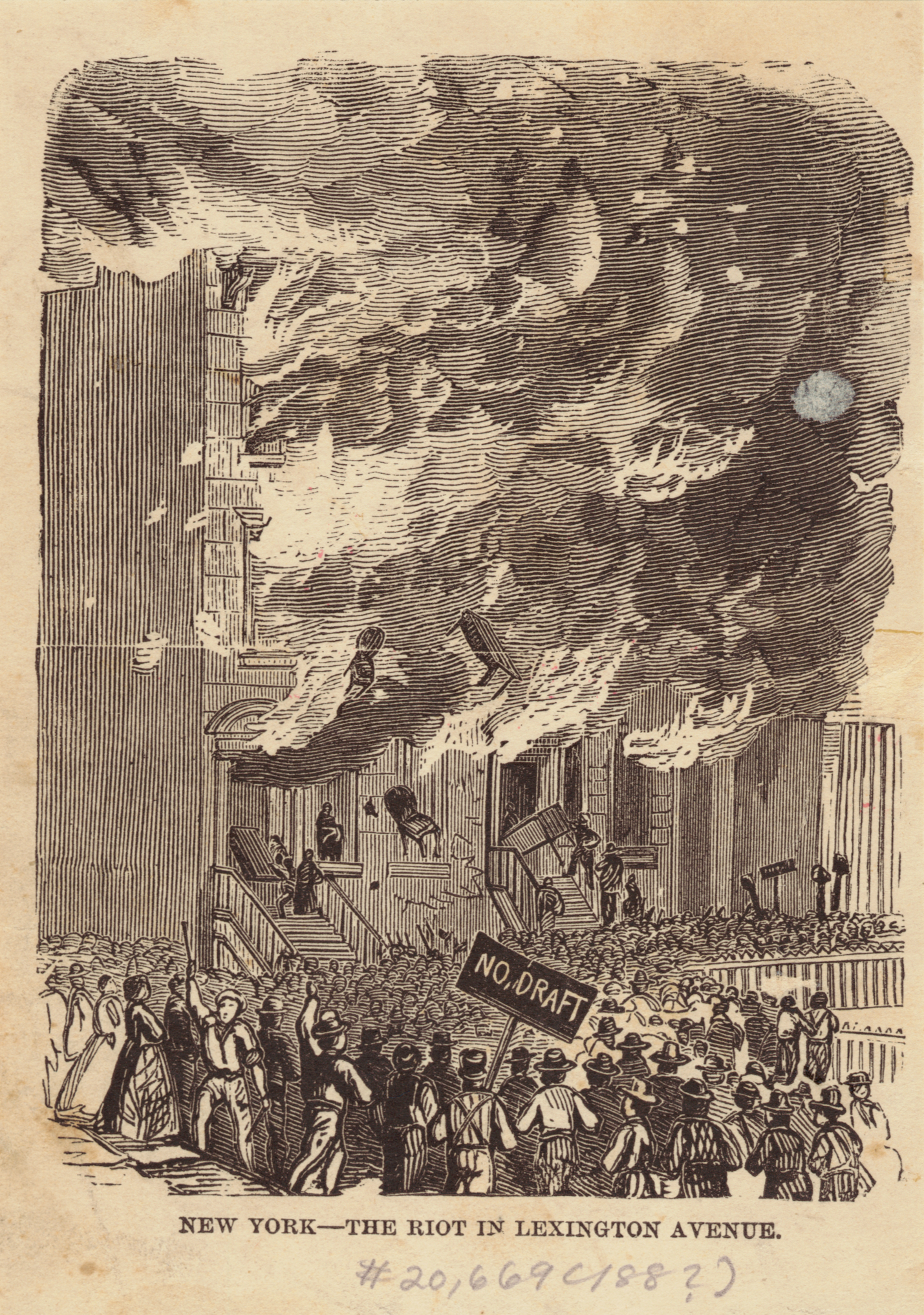
- Rioters attacking a building on Lexington Avenue
- Date: July 13–16, 1863
- Location: Manhattan, New York City, U.S.
- Caused by: Civil War conscription; racism; competition for jobs between black and white people.
- Result: Riots ultimately suppressed

Parties
Rioters	New York Metropolitan Police Department; New York National Guard; Union army New York Fire Department

Casualties
- Deaths: 119–120 (albeit other estimates go as high as 1,200)
- Injuries: 2,000

The New York City draft riots (July 13–16, 1863), sometimes referred to as the Manhattan draft riots and known at the time as Draft Week, were violent disturbances in Lower Manhattan, widely regarded as the culmination of working-class discontent with new laws passed by Congress that year to draft men to fight in the ongoing American Civil War.

The protests turned into a race riot against African Americans by Irish American rioters. President Abraham Lincoln diverted several regiments of militia and volunteer troops after the Battle of Gettysburg to control the city. The official death toll was listed at either 119 or 120. One historian estimated a loss in killed and wounded of 1000, most of whom were of the mob, and a probable damage to private property of $1,500,000 (equivalent to $39,200,000 in 2025). According to another historian, 18 people are known to have been killed by the rioters, 11 of whom were Black.

The riots were one of the largest civil urban disturbances in American history. Conditions in the city were such that Major General John E. Wool, commander of the Department of the East, said on July 16 that "Martial law ought to be proclaimed, but I have not a sufficient force to enforce it." According to Toby Joyce, the riot represented a "civil war" within the city's Irish community, in that "mostly Irish American rioters confronted police, [while] soldiers, and pro-war politicians ... were also to a considerable extent from the local Irish immigrant community."

The military did not reach the city until the second day of rioting, by which time the mobs had ransacked or destroyed numerous public buildings, two Protestant churches, the homes of various abolitionists or sympathizers, many black homes, and the Colored Orphan Asylum at 44th Street and Fifth Avenue, which was burned to the ground. The area's demographics changed as a result of the riot. Many black residents left Manhattan permanently with many moving to Brooklyn. By 1865, the black population had fallen below 11,000 for the first time since 1820.

== Background ==
New York's economy was tied to the South; by 1822, nearly half of its exports were cotton shipments. In addition, upstate textile mills processed cotton in manufacturing. New York had such strong business connections to the South that on January 7, 1861, Mayor Fernando Wood, a Democrat, called on the city's Board of Aldermen to "declare the city's independence from Albany and from Washington"; he said it "would have the whole and united support of the Southern States." When the Union entered the war, New York City had many sympathizers with the South.

The city was also a continuing destination of immigrants. Since the 1840s, most were from Ireland and Germany. In 1860, nearly 25 percent of the New York City population was German-born, and many did not speak English. During the 1840s and 1850s, journalists had published sensational accounts, directed at the white working class, dramatizing the evils of interracial socializing, relationships, and marriages. Reformers joined the effort.

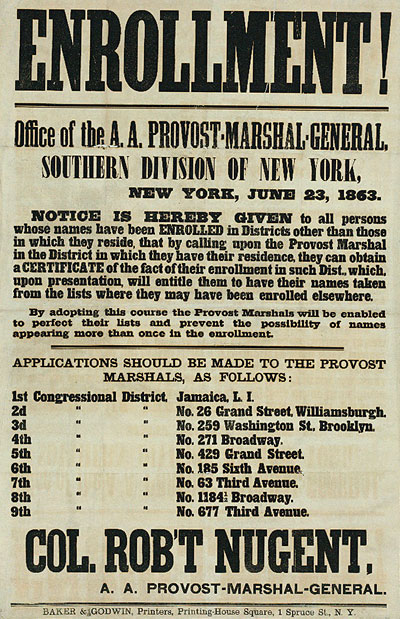
A recruiting poster in New York City in June 1863 for the Enrollment Act, also known as the Civil War Military Draft Act, which authorized the federal government to conscript troops for the Union army

The Democratic Party's Tammany Hall political machine had been working to enroll immigrants as U.S. citizens so they could vote in local elections and had strongly recruited Irish. In March 1863, with the war continuing, Congress passed the Enrollment Act to establish a draft for the first time, as more troops were needed. In New York City and other locations, new citizens learned they were expected to register for the draft to fight for their new country. Black men were excluded from the draft as they were largely not considered citizens, and wealthier white men could pay for substitutes.

New York political offices, including the mayor, were historically held by Democrats before the war, but the election of Abraham Lincoln as president had demonstrated the rise in Republican political power nationally. Newly elected New York City Republican Mayor George Opdyke was mired in profiteering scandals in the months leading up to the riots. The Emancipation Proclamation of January 1863 alarmed much of the white working class in New York, who feared that freed slaves would migrate to the city and add further competition to the labor market. There had already been tensions between black and white workers since the 1850s, particularly at the docks, with free black people and white immigrants competing for low-wage jobs in the city. In March 1863, white longshoremen refused to work with black laborers and rioted, attacking 200 black men.

== Riots ==
=== Monday ===
There were reports of rioting in Buffalo and some other cities, but the first drawing of draft numbers—on Saturday, July 11—occurred peaceably in Manhattan. The second drawing was held on Monday, July 13, ten days after the Union victory at Gettysburg. At 10:00 AM, a furious crowd of around 500, led by the volunteer firemen of Engine Company 33 (known as the "Black Joke"), attacked the assistant Ninth District provost marshal’s office, at Third Avenue and 47th Street, where the draft was taking place.

The crowd threw large paving stones through windows, burst through the doors, and set the building ablaze. When the fire department responded, rioters broke up their vehicles. Others killed horses that were pulling streetcars and smashed the cars. To prevent other parts of the city being notified of the riot, rioters cut telegraph lines.

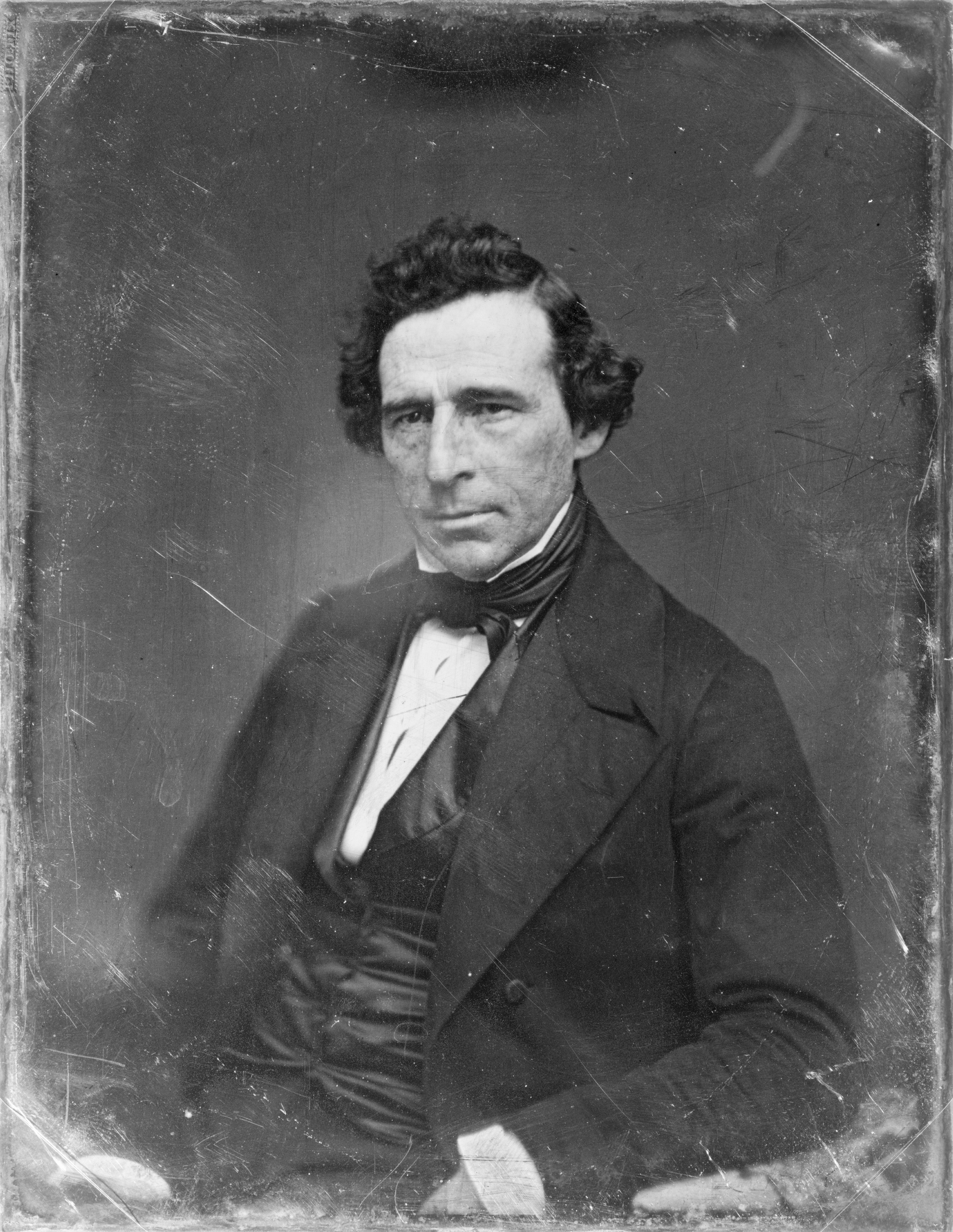
John Alexander Kennedy, NYC police superintendent from 1860 to 1870

Since the New York State Militia had been sent to assist Union troops at Gettysburg, the local New York Metropolitan Police Department was the only force on hand to try to suppress the riots. Police Superintendent John Kennedy arrived at the site on Monday to check on the situation. An Irish-American himself, Kennedy was a steadfast unionist. Although he was not in uniform, people in the mob recognized him and attacked him. Kennedy was left nearly unconscious, his face bruised and cut, his eye injured, his lips swollen, and his hand cut with a knife. He had been beaten to a mass of bruises and blood all over his body. Physicians later counted over 70 knife wounds alone. He would never fully recover.

Police drew their clubs and revolvers and charged the crowd but were overpowered. The police were badly outnumbered and unable to quell the riots, but they kept the rioting out of Lower Manhattan below Union Square. Inhabitants of the "Bloody Sixth" Ward, around the South Street Seaport and Five Points areas, refrained from involvement in the rioting. The 19th Company/1st Battalion US Army Invalid Corps which was part of the Provost Guard tried to disperse the mob with a volley of gunfire but were overwhelmed and suffered over 14 injured with 1 soldier missing (believed killed).

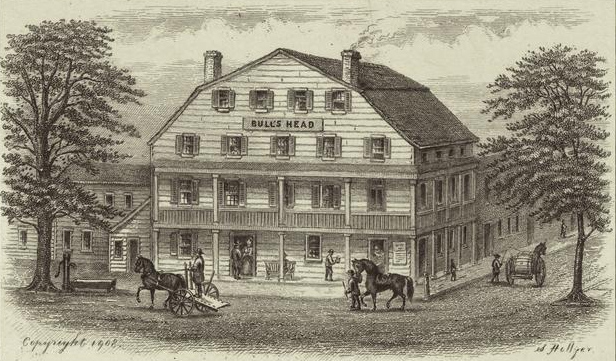
Bull's Head Hotel, depicted in 1830, was burned after it refused to serve alcohol to the rioters.

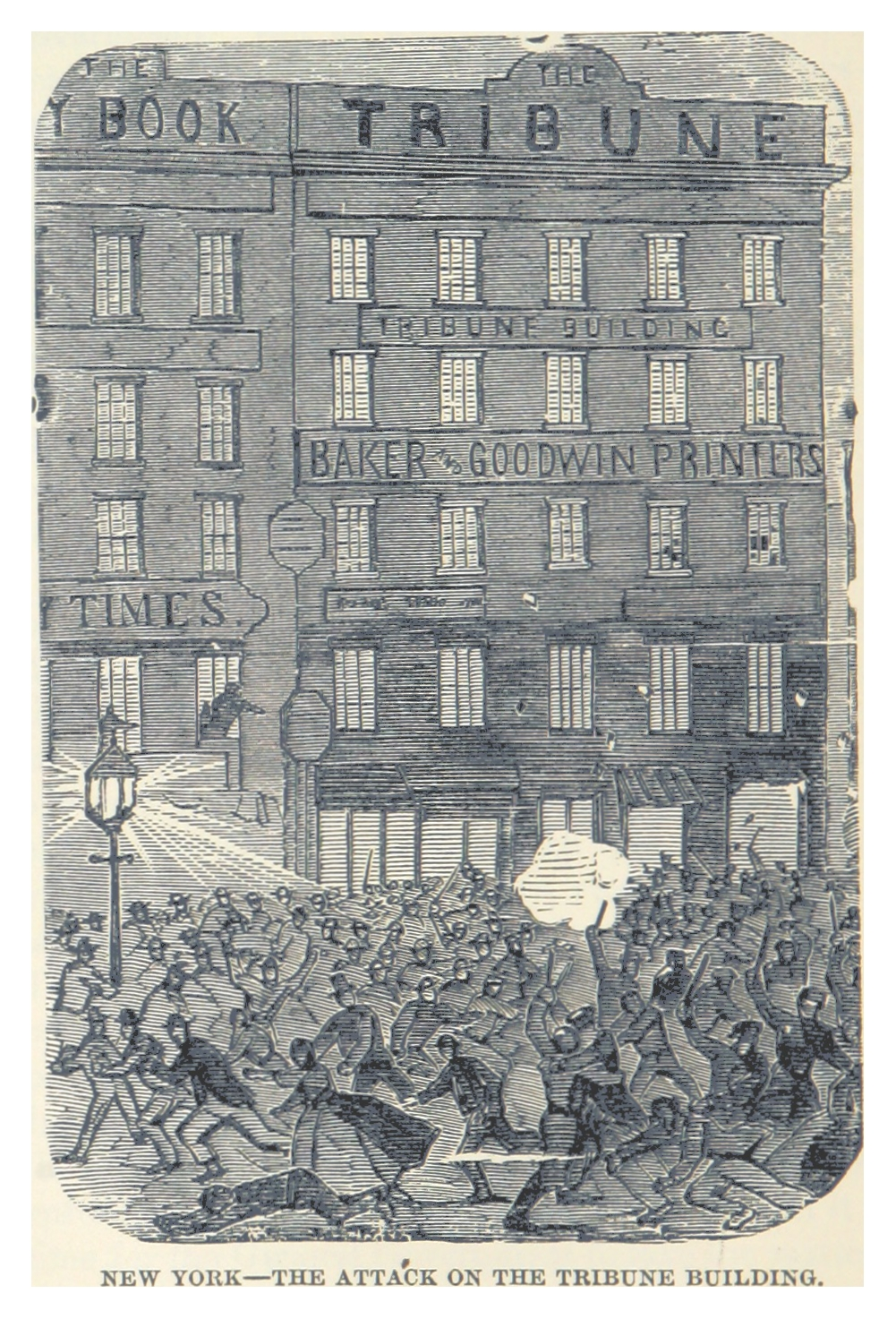
Attack on the Tribune building

The Bull's Head hotel on 44th Street, which refused to provide alcohol to the rioters, was burned. The mayor's residence on Fifth Avenue was spared by words of Judge George Gardner Barnard, and the crowd of about 500 turned to another location of pillage. The Eighth and Fifth District police stations, and other buildings were attacked and set on fire. Other targets included the office of The New York Times. The mob was turned back at the Times office by staff manning Gatling guns, including Times founder Henry Jarvis Raymond. Fire engine companies responded, but some firefighters were sympathetic to the rioters because they had also been drafted on Saturday. The New York Tribune was attacked, being looted and burned; not until police arrived and extinguished the flames was the crowd dispersed. Later in the afternoon, authorities shot and killed a man as a crowd attacked the armory at Second Avenue and 21st Street. The mob broke all the windows with paving stones ripped from the street.

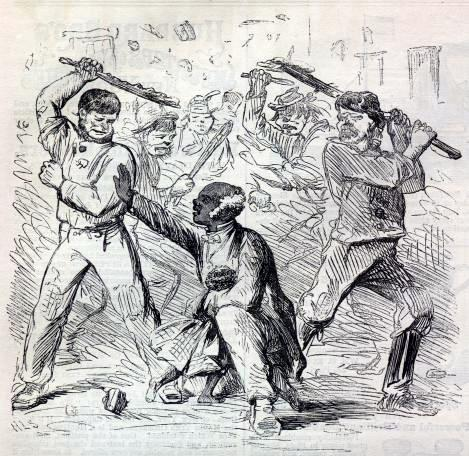
Rioters striking Black civilians

The mob beat, tortured and/or killed numerous black civilians, including one man who was attacked by a crowd of 400 with clubs and paving stones, then lynched, hanged from a tree and set alight.

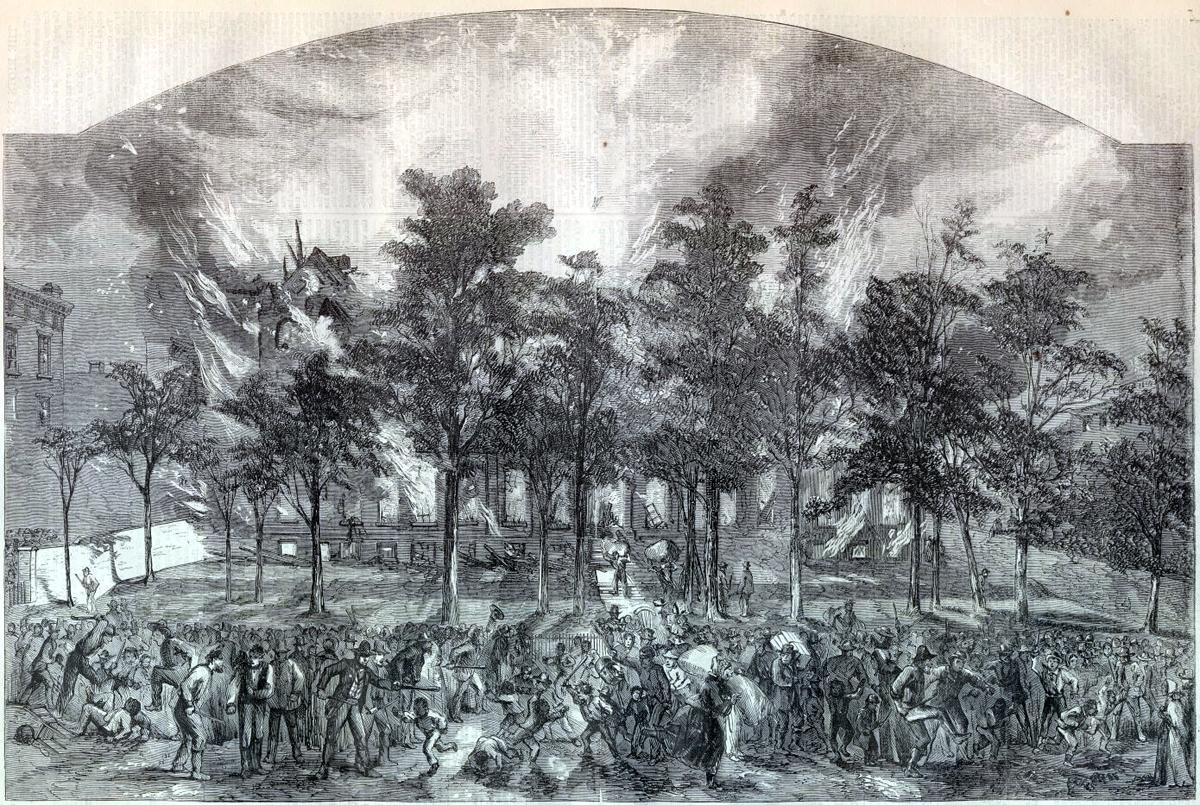
The Colored Orphan Asylum which was looted and burned

The Colored Orphan Asylum at 43rd Street and Fifth Avenue, according to Leslie M. Harris an "imposing symbol of white charity to blacks and of black upward mobility" that provided shelter for around 230 children, was attacked by a mob at around 4 pm. A mob of several thousand, including many women and children, looted the building of its food and supplies. However, the police were able to secure the orphanage for enough time to allow the orphans to escape before the building burned down. The children were taken out by the backdoor of the home and escorted to Twentieth Precinct station house by the Superintendent of the asylum, Davis, where they were received by Sergeant Petty. Throughout the areas of rioting, mobs attacked and killed numerous black civilians and destroyed their homes and businesses, such as James McCune Smith's pharmacy at 93 West Broadway, believed to be the first owned by a black man in the United States.

Looting during the riots

Near the midtown docks, tensions brewing since the mid-1850s boiled over. As recently as March 1863, white employers had hired black longshoremen, with whom many white men refused to work. Rioters went into the streets in search of "all the negro porters, cartmen and laborers" to attempt to remove all evidence of a black and interracial social life from the area near the docks. White dockworkers attacked and destroyed brothels, dance halls, boarding houses, and tenements that catered to black people. Mobs stripped the clothing off the white owners of these businesses.

=== Tuesday ===
Heavy rain fell on Monday night, helping to abate the fires and sending rioters home, but the crowds returned the next day. Rioters burned down the home of Abby Gibbons, a prison reformer and the daughter of abolitionist Isaac Hopper. They also attacked white "amalgamationists", such as Ann Derrickson and Ann Martin, two white women who were married to black men, and Mary Burke, a white prostitute who catered to black men.

Governor Horatio Seymour arrived on Tuesday and spoke at City Hall, where he attempted to assuage the crowd by proclaiming that the Enrollment Act was unconstitutional. General John E. Wool, commander of the Eastern District, brought approximately 800 soldiers and Marines in from forts in New York Harbor, West Point, and the Brooklyn Navy Yard. He ordered the militias to return to New York.

=== Wednesday ===
The situation improved July 15 when assistant provost-marshal-general Robert Nugent received word from his superior officer, Colonel James Barnet Fry, to postpone the draft. As this news appeared in newspapers, some rioters stayed home. But some of the militias began to return and used harsh measures against the remaining rioters. The rioting spread to Brooklyn and Staten Island.

=== Thursday ===
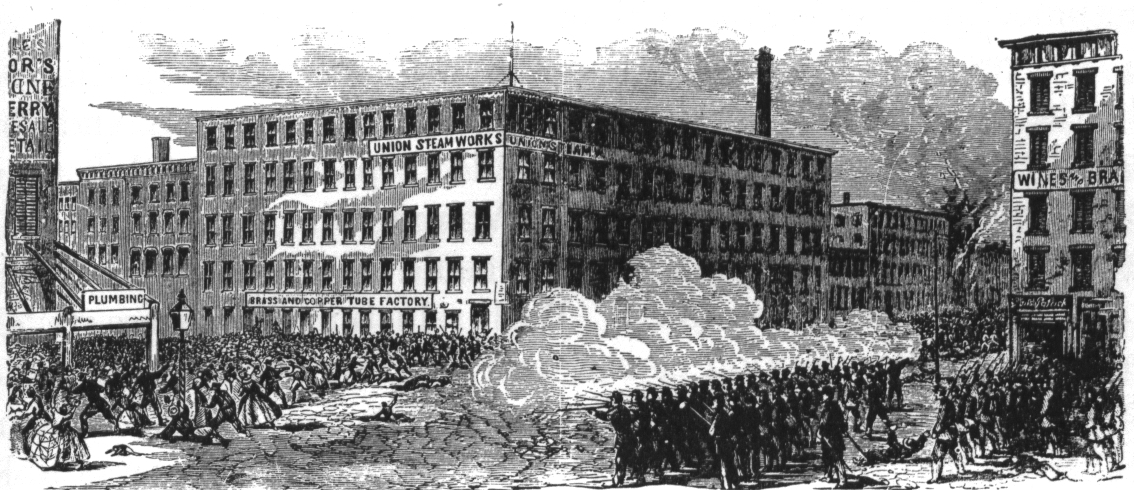
Riot suppression

Order began to be restored on July 16. The New York State Militia and some federal troops were returned to New York, including the 152nd New York Volunteers, the 26th Michigan Volunteers, the 27th Indiana Volunteers and the 7th Regiment New York State Militia from Frederick, Maryland, after a forced march. In addition, the governor sent in the 74th and 65th regiments of the New York State Militia, which had not been in federal service, and a section of the 20th Independent Battery, New York Volunteer Artillery from Fort Schuyler in Throggs Neck. The New York State Militia units were the first to arrive. There were several thousand militia and Federal troops in the city.

A final confrontation occurred in the evening near Gramercy Park. According to Adrian Cook, twelve people died on this last day of the riots in skirmishes between rioters, the police, and the army.

The New York Times reported on Thursday that Plug Uglies and Blood Tubs gang members from Baltimore, as well as "Scuykill Rangers [sic] and other rowdies of Philadelphia", had come to New York during the unrest to participate in the riots alongside the Dead Rabbits and "Mackerelvillers". The Times editorialized that "the scoundrels cannot afford to miss this golden opportunity of indulging their brutal natures, and at the same time serving their colleagues the Copperheads and secesh [secessionist] sympathizers."

== Aftermath ==
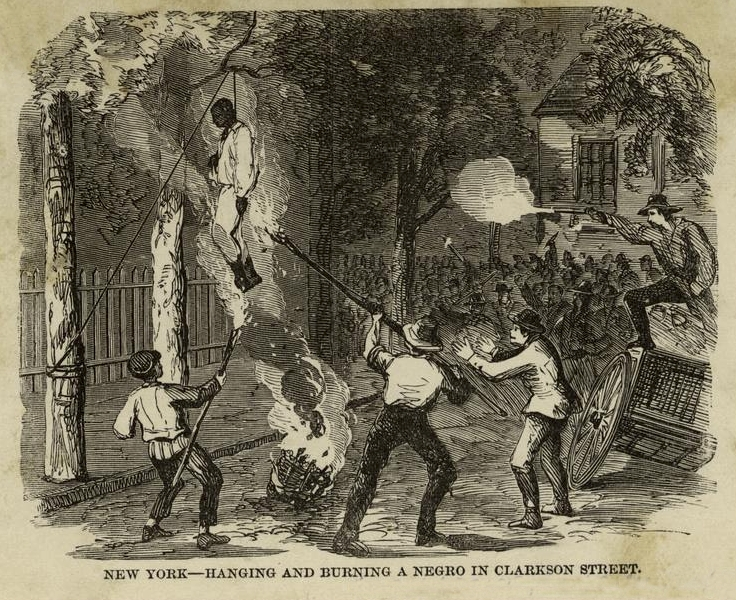
Depiction of lynching during the New York City draft riots in 1863

The exact death toll during the New York draft riots is unknown, but according to historian James M. McPherson, 119 or 120 people were killed, although other estimates list the death toll as high as 1,200. Violence by longshoremen against black men was especially fierce in the docks area:

West of Broadway, below Twenty-sixth, all was quiet at 9 o'clock last night. A crowd was at the corner of Seventh avenue and Twenty-seventh Street at that time. This was the scene of the hanging of a negro in the morning, and another at 6 o'clock in the evening. The body of the one hung in the morning presented a shocking appearance at the Station-House. His fingers and toes had been sliced off, and there was scarcely an inch of his flesh which was not gashed. Late in the afternoon, a negro was dragged out of his house in West Twenty-seventh street, beaten down on the sidewalk, pounded in a horrible manner, and then hanged to a tree.

In all, eleven black men and boys were hanged over five days. Among the murdered black people was the seven-year-old Bermudian nephew, Joseph Reed, of Robert John Simmons of the 54th Massachusetts Infantry Regiment, whose account of fighting in South Carolina, written on the approach to Fort Wagner July 18, 1863, was to be published in the New York Tribune on December 23, 1863 (Simmons having died in August of wounds received in the attack on Fort Wagner).

The most reliable estimates indicate at least 2,000 people were injured. Herbert Asbury, the author of the 1928 book Gangs of New York, upon which the 2002 film was based, puts the figure much higher, at 2,000 killed and 8,000 wounded, a number that is widely disputed. Total property damage was about $1–5 million (equivalent to $20.5 million – $103 million in 2025). The city treasury later indemnified one-quarter of the amount.

Historian Samuel Eliot Morison wrote that the riots were "equivalent to a Confederate victory". Fifty buildings, including two Protestant churches and the Colored Orphan Asylum, were burned to the ground. 4,000 federal troops had to be pulled out of the Gettysburg campaign to suppress the riots, troops that could have aided in pursuing the battered Army of Northern Virginia as it retreated out of Union territory. During the riots, landlords, fearing that the mob would destroy their buildings, drove black residents from their homes. As a result of the violence against them, hundreds of black people left New York, including physician James McCune Smith and his family, moving to Williamsburg, Brooklyn, or New Jersey.

The white elite in New York organized to provide relief to black riot victims, helping them find new work and homes. The Union League Club and the Committee of Merchants for the Relief of Colored People provided nearly $40,000 to 2,500 victims of the riots. By 1865 the black population in the city had dropped to under 10,000, the lowest since 1820. The white working-class riots had changed the demographics of the city, and white residents exerted their control in the workplace; they became "unequivocally divided" from the black population.

On August 19, the government resumed the draft in New York. It was completed within 10 days without further incident. Fewer men were drafted than had been feared by the white working class: of the 750,000 selected nationwide for conscription, about 45,000 were sent into active duty.

While the rioting mainly involved the white working class, middle and upper-class New Yorkers had split sentiments on the draft and use of federal power or martial law to enforce it. Many wealthy Democratic businessmen sought to have the draft declared unconstitutional. Tammany Democrats did not seek to have the draft declared unconstitutional, but they helped pay the commutation fees for those who were drafted.

In December 1863, the Union League Club recruited more than 2,000 black soldiers, outfitted and trained them, honoring and sending men off with a parade through the city to the Hudson River docks in March 1864. A crowd of 100,000 watched the procession, which was led by police and members of the Union League Club.

New York's support for the Union cause continued, however grudgingly, and gradually Southern sympathies declined in the city. New York banks eventually financed the Civil War, and the state's industries were more productive than those of the entire Confederacy. By the end of the war, more than 450,000 soldiers, sailors, and militia had enlisted from New York State, which was the most populous state at the time. A total of 46,000 military men from New York State died during the war, more from disease than wounds—as was typical during the war.

== Order of battle ==
=== New York Metropolitan Police Department ===
New York Metropolitan Police Department under the command of Superintendent John A. Kennedy.
Commissioners Thomas Coxon Acton and John G. Bergen took command when Kennedy was seriously injured by a mob during the early stages of the riots.
Of the NYPD officers there were four fatalities: one was killed and three died of injuries

Precinct	Commander	Location	Strength	Notes
1st Precinct	Captain Jacob B. Warlow	29 Broad Street	4 sergeants, 63 patrolmen, and 2 doormen	
2nd Precinct	Captain Nathaniel R. Mills	49 Beekman Street	4 sergeants, 60 patrolmen, and 2 doormen	
3rd Precinct	Captain James Greer	160 Chambers Street	3 sergeants, 64 patrolmen, and 2 doormen	
4th Precinct	Captain James Bryan	9 Oak Street	4 sergeants, 70 patrolmen, and 2 doormen	
5th Precinct	Captain Jeremiah Petty	49 Leonard Street	4 sergeants, 61 patrolmen, and 2 doormen	
6th Precinct	Captain John Jourdan	9 Franklin Street	4 sergeants, 63 patrolmen, and 2 doormen	
7th Precinct	Captain William Jamieson	247 Madison Street	4 sergeants, 52 patrolmen, and 2 doormen	
8th Precinct	Captain Morris DeCamp	126 Wooster Street	4 sergeants, 52 patrolmen, and 2 doormen	
9th Precinct	Captain Jacob L. Sebring	94 Charles Street	4 sergeants, 51 patrolmen, and 2 doormen	
10th Precinct	Captain Thaddeus C. Davis	Essex Market	4 sergeants, 62 patrolmen, and 2 doormen	
11th Precinct	Captain John I. Mount	Union Market	4 sergeants, 56 patrolmen, and 2 doormen	
12th Precinct	Captain Theron R. Bennett	126th Street (near Third Avenue)	5 sergeants, 41 patrolmen, and 2 doormen	
13th Precinct	Captain Thomas Steers	Attorney Street (at corner of Delancey Street)	4 sergeants, 63 patrolmen, and 2 doormen	
14th Precinct	Captain John J. Williamson	53 Spring Street	4 sergeants, 58 patrolmen, and 2 doormen	
15th Precinct	Captain Charles W. Caffery	220 Mercer Street	4 sergeants, 69 patrolmen, and 2 doormen	
16th Precinct	Captain Henry Hedden	156 West 20th Street	4 sergeants, 50 patrolmen, and 2 doormen	
17th Precinct	Captain Samuel Brower	First Avenue (at the corner of Fifth Street)	4 sergeants, 56 patrolmen, and 2 doormen	
18th Precinct	Captain John Cameron	22nd Street (near Second Avenue)	4 sergeants, 74 patrolmen, and 2 doormen	
19th Precinct	Captain Galen T. Porter	59th Street (near Third Avenue)	4 sergeants, 49 patrolmen, and 2 doormen	
20th Precinct	Captain George W. Walling	212 West 35th Street	4 sergeants, 59 patrolmen, and 2 doormen	
21st Precinct	Sergeant Cornelius Burdick (acting Captain)	120 East 31st Street	4 sergeants, 51 patrolmen, and 2 doormen	
22nd Precinct	Captain Johannes C. Slott	47th Street (between Eighth and Ninth Avenues)	4 sergeants, 54 patrolmen, and 2 doormen	
23rd Precinct	Captain Henry Hutchings	86th Street (near Fourth Avenue)	4 sergeants, 42 patrolmen, and 2 doormen	
24th Precinct	Captain James Todd	New York waterfront	2 sergeants and 20 patrolmen	Headquartered on Police Steamboat No. 1
25th Precinct	Captain Theron Copeland	300 Mulberry Street	1 sergeant, 38 patrolmen, and 2 doormen	Headquarters of the Broadway Squad.
26th Precinct	Captain Thomas W. Thorne	City Hall	1 sergeant, 66 patrolmen, and 2 doormen	
27th Precinct	Captain John C. Helme	117 Cedar Street	4 sergeants, 52 patrolmen, and 3 doormen	
28th Precinct	Captain John F. Dickson	550 Greenwich Street	4 sergeants, 48 patrolmen, and 2 doormen	
29th Precinct	Captain Francis C. Speight	29th Street (near Fourth Avenue)	4 sergeants, 82 patrolmen, and 3 doormen	
30th Precinct	Captain James Z. Bogart	86th Street and Bloomingdale Road	2 sergeants, 19 patrolmen, and 2 doormen	
32nd Precinct	Captain Alanson S. Wilson	Tenth Avenue and 152nd Street	4 sergeants, 35 patrolmen, and 2 doormen	Mounted police
Total			114 sergeants, 1680 patrolmen, and 62 doormen	

=== New York State Militia ===
1st Division: Major General Charles W. Sandford

Unit	Commander	Complement	Officers	Other ranks
65th Regiment	Colonel William F. Berens	401		
74th Regiment	Colonel Watson A. Fox			
20th Independent Battery	Captain B. Franklin Ryer			

Unorganized militia:

Unit	Commander	Complement	Officers	Remarks
Veteran Corps of Artillery				Guarded State Arsenal from rioters

=== Union army ===
Department of the East: Major General John E. Wool headquartered in New York

Defenses of New York City: Brevet Brigadier General Harvey Brown, (Note: Brown was in overall command of the military fortresses in New York city at the time and volunteered his services to General Wool. Wool instructed Brown to serve under the command of militia General Sandford to which Brown initially refused but eventually offered to serve in whatever capacity needed.) Brig. General Edward R. S. Canby (Note: Brown was relieved of duty on July 16 and Canby succeeded him in command of the military post of New York City on July 17.)

- Artillery: Captain Henry F. Putnam, 12th United States Infantry Regiment.
- Provost marshals tasked with overseeing the initial enforcement of the draft:
  - Provost Marshal General U.S.A.: Colonel James Fry
  - Provost Marshal General New York City: Colonel Robert Nugent (During the first day of rioting on July 13, 1863, in command of the Invalid Corps: 1st Battalion)

Secretary of War Edwin M. Stanton authorized five regiments from Gettysburg, mostly federalized state militia and volunteer units from the Army of the Potomac, to reinforce the New York City Police Department. By the end of the riots, there were more than 4,000 soldiers garrisoned in the troubled area.

Unit	Commander	Complement	Officers	Notes
Invalid Corps				1st and 2nd Battalions; just over 9 companies. (15th and 19th Companies 1st Battalion VRC & 1st Company 21st VRC Regiment) Over 16 injured; 1 killed 1 missing
26th Michigan Volunteer Infantry Regiment	Colonel Judson S. Farrar			
5th New York Volunteer Infantry Regiment	Colonel Cleveland Winslow	50		Returning to New York in May 1863, the original regiment was mustered out after its two-year enlistment period. However, after having subsequently reorganized the 5th New York Infantry as a veteran battalion on May 25, Winslow was recalled to New York City to suppress the New York City draft riots the following month. Winslow Commanded a small force consisting of 50 men from his regiment as well as 200 volunteers under a Major Robinson and two howitzers of Col. Jardine
7th New York National Guard Regiment	Colonel Marshall Lefferts	800		Recalled to New York; on the way, one private drowned. On July 16, 1863, during a skirmish with rioters, the regimental casualties were one private received a buckshot in the back of the hand and two privates had their coats cut by bullets
8th New York National Guard Regiment	Brigadier General Charles C. Dodge	150		
9th New York Volunteer Infantry Regiment	Colonel Edward E. Jardine (wounded)			Regiment had been mustered out in May 1863 but 200 volunteered to serve again during the draft riots
11th New York Volunteer Infantry Regiment	Colonel Henry O'Brien (killed)			Original regiment mustered out on June 2, 1862. Colonel O'Brien was in the process of recruiting at the time of the draft riots. The regiment was never brought back to strength and enlisted members were transferred to 17th Veteran Infantry.
11th U.S. Regular Infantry Regiment	Colonel Erasmus D. Keyes			In the fall of 1863 the Regular infantry, with other commands from the Army of the Potomac, were sent to New York City to preserve order during the next draft. The 11th Infantry encamped on the East River, across the street and to the north of Jones' Wood garden. When the purpose for which the troops were sent to New York had been accomplished, they were ordered back to the front.
13th New York Volunteer Cavalry Regiment	Colonel Charles E. Davies			Regiment suffered 2 fatalities during the riots.
14th New York Volunteer Cavalry Regiment	Colonel Thaddeus P. Mott			All cavalry regiments in New York City were eventually put under the command of General Judson Kilpatrick who volunteered his services on July 17
17th New York Volunteer Infantry Regiment	Major T. W. C. Grower			Regimental losses during the Draft Riots totaled 4; they were 1 enlisted man killed and 1 officer and 2 enlisted men wounded {recovered}
22nd New York National Guard Regiment	Colonel Lloyd Aspinwall			
47th New York State Militia/National Guard Regiment	Colonel Jeremiah V. Messerole			
152nd New York Volunteer Infantry Regiment	Colonel Alonso Ferguson			
14th Indiana Infantry Regiment	Colonel John Coons			

== In popular culture ==
=== Fiction ===
- Wilderness: A Tale of the Civil War (1961) by Robert Penn Warren
- The Banished Children of Eve, A Novel of Civil War New York (1995) by Peter Quinn
- My Notorious Life: A Novel (2014) by Kate Manning
- On Secret Service (2000) by John Jakes
- Paradise Alley (2003) by Kevin Baker
- New York: the Novel (2009) by Edward Rutherfurd
- Grant Comes East (2004) by Newt Gingrich
- Last Descendants (2016) by Matthew J. Kirby
- Riot (2009) by Walter Dean Myers
- A Wish After Midnight (2008) by Zetta Elliott, speculative fiction set in Brooklyn alternating between the early 21st century and 1863.
- Libertie (2021) by Kaitlyn Greenidge
- Moon and the Mars (2021) by Kia Corthron
- Booth (2021) by Karen Joy Fowler
- How to Dodge a Cannonball (2025) by Dennard Dayle

=== Television, theatre and film ===
- The short-lived 1968 Broadway musical Maggie Flynn was set in the Tobin Orphanage for black children (modeled on the Colored Orphan Asylum).
- Gangs of New York (2002), a film directed by Martin Scorsese, includes a fictionalized portrayal of the New York Draft Riots in its finale.
- Paradise Square (2018), a musical that had its Broadway debut in 2022, depicts events that led up to and included the New York Draft Riots.
- Copper (2012), a BBC America television series about the Five Points in New York City in 1864–1865, has flashbacks to the riots and the lynchings which took place in the area.

== See also ==
- 1862 Brooklyn riot
- Fishing Creek Confederacy
- History of New York City (1855–1897)
- List of ethnic riots#United States
- List of expulsions of African Americans
- List of identities in The Gangs of New York § Draft riots
- List of incidents of civil unrest in New York City
- List of incidents of civil unrest in the United States
- List of massacres in the United States
- Lynching in the United States
- Mass racial violence in the United States
- Opposition to the American Civil War
- Racism against Black Americans
- Racism in the United States

== Bibliography ==
- Bernstein, Iver (1990). The New York City Draft Riots: Their Significance for American Society and Politics in the Age of the Civil War. New York: Oxford University Press. ISBN 0-19-802171-2.
- Cook, Adrian (1974). The Armies of the Streets: The New York City Draft Riots of 1863. University Press of Kentucky. ISBN 978-0-8131-1298-5.
- Fry, James Barnet (1885). New York and the Conscription of 1863. G.P. Putnam's Sons.
- Headley, Joel Tyler (1873). The Great Riots of New York, 1712 to 1863 – including and full and complete account of the Four Days' Draft Riot of 1863. E.B. Treat (publisher), stereotyped at the Women's Printing House
- McCabe, James Dabney (1868). The Life and Public Services of Horatio Seymour. Oxford University Press. "horatio seymour."
- McPherson, James M. (1982), Ordeal By Fire: The Civil War and Reconstruction, New York: Alfred A. Knopf, ISBN 978-0-394-52469-6
- Rumsey, David. "Map Of New York and Vicinity (1863)" (1863 ed.). Matthew Dripps.
- Schecter, Barnet (2005). The Devil's Own Work: The Civil War Draft Riots and the Fight to Reconstruct America. Bloomsbury Publishing. ISBN 0-8027-1837-X.
- Schecter, Barnet (2007). "The Civil War Draft Riots". North & South. 10 (1). Civil War Society: 72.
