= James Barnet Fry =

American Union Army General (1827–1894)

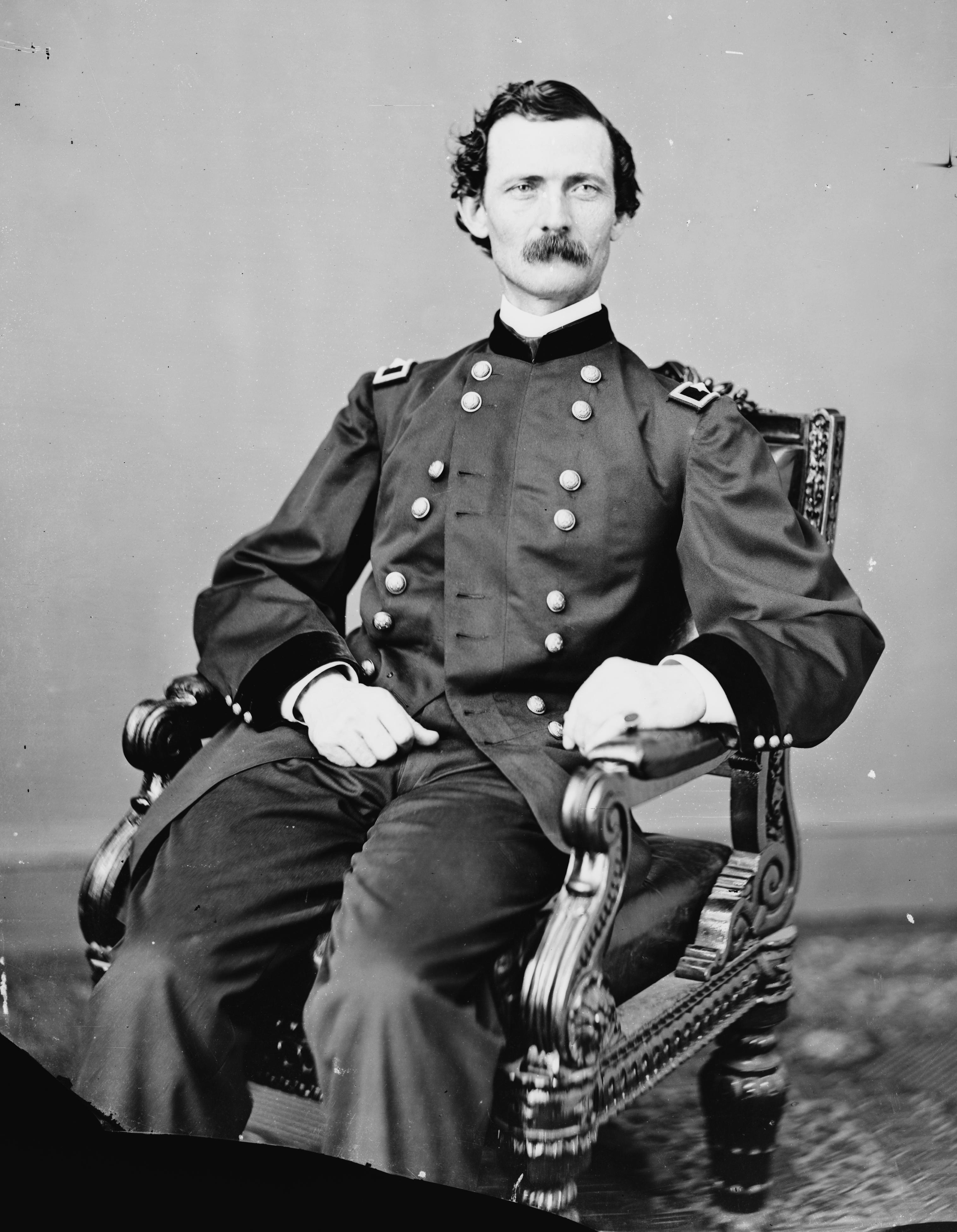
- James Barnet Fry
- Born: February 22, 1827; Carrollton, Illinois, US
- Died: July 11, 1894 (aged 67); Newport, Rhode Island, US
- Burial place: Church of St. James the Less, Philadelphia
- Education: United States Military Academy
- Military career
- Allegiance: United States of America; Union
- Branch: United States Army; Union Army
- Service years: 1847–1881
- Rank: Brigadier General; Brevet Major General
- Commands: Provost Marshal General
- Conflicts: Mexican–American War; John Brown's raid; American Civil War; First Battle of Bull Run; Battle of Shiloh; Siege of Corinth; Battle of Perryville
- Other work: author

James Barnet Fry (February 22, 1827 – July 11, 1894) was an American soldier and prolific author of historical books.

== Family and early career ==
Fry, who was born in Carrollton, Illinois, was the first child of General Jacob G. Fry (September 20, 1799 – January 27, 1881) and Emily Turney (March 11, 1811 – April 11, 1881), who were married on May 25, 1826, in Carrollton. James' sister Sarah "Sallie" Fry (1828 – January 17, 1916) married her cousin John Douglas Fry (July 1, 1819 – February 3, 1901), a San Francisco banking and mining magnate, on January 30, 1867, in Greene County, Illinois.

James entered the United States Military Academy at West Point on July 1, 1843, and graduated on July 1, 1847. He briefly served as an assistant instructor of artillery at West Point after graduation.

In the fall of 1847 he went to Mexico as a 2nd lieutenant in the 1st Artillery to serve under General Scott in the Mexican–American War as part of the garrison of Mexico City. In 1848 he was posted to Fort Columbus in New York Harbor and transferred to Fort Vancouver in Washington in 1849. He was transferred to Astoria, Oregon, in 1850. He was promoted to 1st lieutenant on February 22, 1851.

Fry had several postings on the Gulf coast from 1851 to 1853 when he was reassigned to West Point. He served as an assistant instructor of artillery from December 15, 1853, until he became adjutant of the Academy on August 1, 1854, where he served until August 31, 1859.

Fry was in garrison at Fort Monroe, Virginia at the Artillery School for Practice from 1859 to 1860. He served on the Harper's Ferry Expedition, to suppress John Brown's Raid in October 1859. He then served as Recorder of the Board to "Revise the Programme of Instruction at the Military Academy," from January 12 to April 24, 1860. He then served in garrison at Baton Rouge, Louisiana, in 1860 and on frontier duty at Fort Leavenworth, Kansas from 1860 to 1861. He then was in garrison, commanding a battery of light artillery, at Washington, D. C. in early 1861.

== Civil War service ==
In July 1861 he served as chief of staff to Brigadier General Irvin McDowell at the First Battle of Bull Run. He was promoted as an assistant adjutant general with the rank of captain on August 3, 1861.

On November 15, 1861, he was assigned as chief of staff to Major General Don Carlos Buell. General Buell successively commanded the Department of the Ohio and the Army of the Ohio. In this assignment, Fry participated in the Battle of Shiloh and the Siege of Corinth in April and May 1862. Fry was promoted to the rank of major on April 22, 1862, and to lieutenant colonel on December 31 of the same year. On October 8, 1862, Fry participated in the Battle of Perryville, Kentucky.

Fry then served as assistant in charge of the appointment branch of the Adjutant-General's Office, at Washington, D. C. from November 12, 1862, until he was appointed provost marshal general of the United States Army. In this capacity he was responsible for tracking deserters, enforcing military laws and overseeing the Invalid Corps. He was appointed to the position, with the rank of colonel, on March 17, 1863, and was promoted to brigadier general on April 21, 1864. Fry served as provost marshal general until the office was abolished on August 27, 1866.

Effective on March 15, 1865, but probably awarded later, Fry was brevetted to the rank of major general in the Regular Army in recognition of his service at the First Battle of Bull Run, the Battle of Shiloh and for "faithful, meritorious and distinguished service as Provost Marshal General during the war."

== Later career ==
With the abolishment of the position of Provost Marshal General, Fry reverted to his permanent rank of lieutenant colonel and served as the adjutant general of the Division of the Pacific from December 3, 1866, to May 17, 1869, and of the Division of the South from June 19, 1869, to July 14, 1871. He also served as adjutant general of the Division of the Missouri from July 24, 1871, to November 26, 1873, and of the Division of the Atlantic from Nov. 28, 1873 to July 1, 1881.

On March 3, 1875, Fry was promoted to the rank of colonel. He served as adjutant general of the Department of the East from January 1, 1878, until his retirement from the Army on July 1, 1881.

After retiring, Fry devoted his time to writing military histories. In 1885 he wrote Killed by a Brother Soldier, detailing the murder of Major General William "Bull" Nelson by Brigadier General Jefferson C. Davis (not to be confused with the Confederate President) in September 1862. Davis was arrested shortly after the murder, but charges were never brought against him.

In 1883 Fry became a member of the Aztec Club of 1847. In 1890 he was elected as a Veteran Companion of the New York Commandery of the Military Order of the Loyal Legion of the United States.

General Fry was the uncle of engineer and naval officer Captain Alfred Brooks Fry.

General Fry died in Newport, Rhode Island, and was buried at the Church of St. James the Less in Philadelphia.

== Published works ==
- Final Report of the Operations of the Bureau of the Provost-Marshal-General in 1863-1866 This was issued as a congressional document (2 parts, Washington, 1866).
- A Sketch of the Adjutant-General's Department, United States Army, from 1775 to 1875 (1875)
- History and Legal Effects of Brevets in the Armies of Great Britain and the United States, from their Origin in 1692 to the Present Time (1877)
- Army Sacrifices (1879)
- Operations of the Army under Buell (1884)
- McDowell and Tyler in the Campaign of Bull Run (1884)
- New York and Conscription (1885)
- Military Miscellanies (1893)
- The Conkling and Blaine-Fry Controversy (1893)

== See also ==
- List of American Civil War generals (Union)
