= John Alexander Kennedy =

New York police superintendent

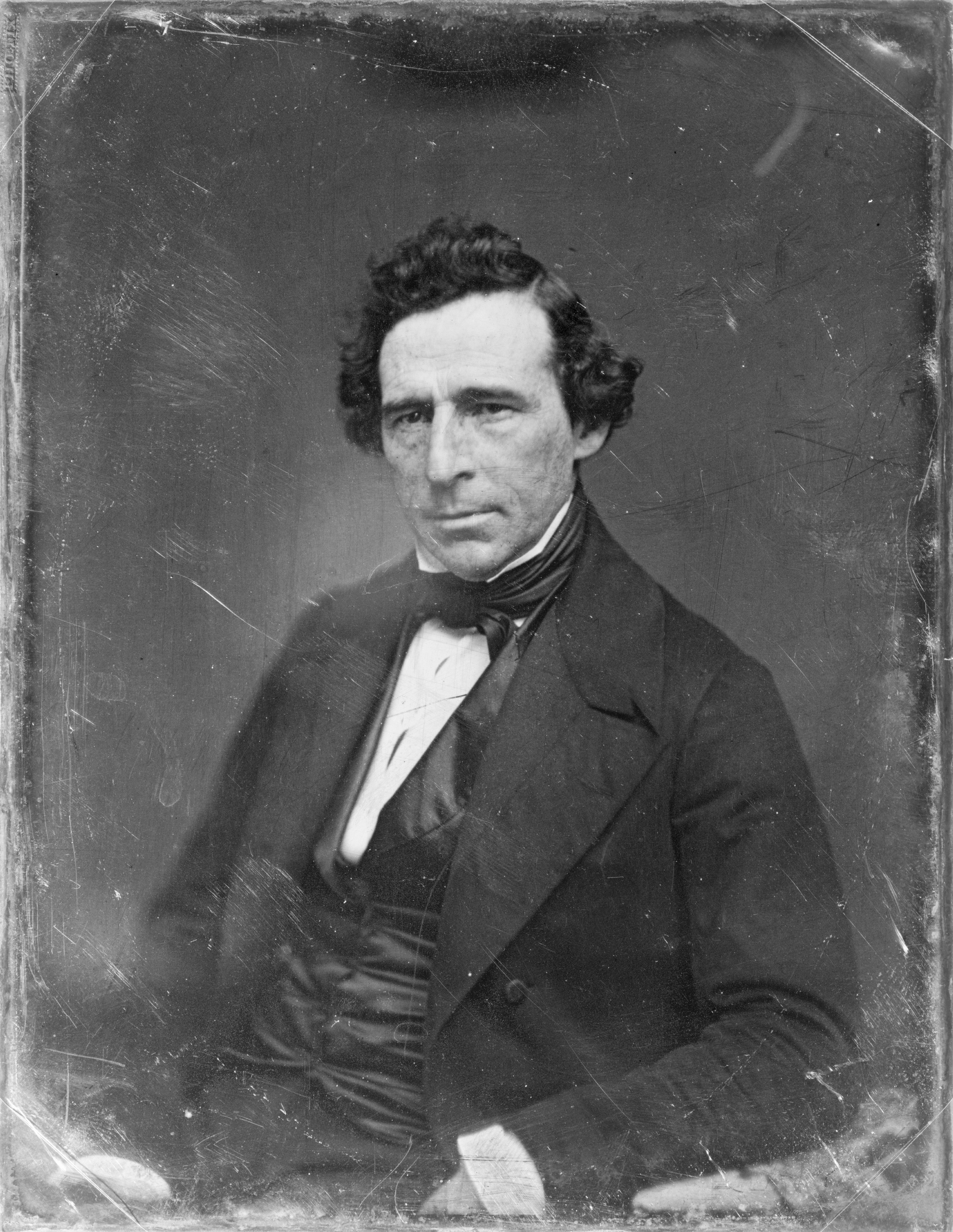
- Kennedy, c. 1844–1860

Personal details
- Born: John Alexander Kennedy; August 9, 1803 Baltimore, Maryland, U.S.
- Died: June 20, 1873 (aged 69) New York City, U.S.

John Alexander Kennedy (August 9, 1803 – June 20, 1873) was the superintendent of police for New York City, from 1860 to 1863. He was in charge of the police response to the New York City draft riots in 1863, until he was badly beaten by the mobs.

== Biography ==
He was born in Baltimore, Maryland on August 9, 1803. His father was a native of Ireland who became a teacher in Baltimore. John moved to New York City and worked with his brother. In 1849 he was appointed a state commissioner of emigration, and in 1854 he was elected a member of the common council.

He was appointed superintendent of Castle Garden, and worked to protect emigrants against swindlers, as well as to administer the day to day activities at the immigrant depot. In 1860, he became superintendent of the New York City Police Department. During the New York City draft riots on the morning of 14 July 1863, Kennedy was not in uniform but he was recognized and severely beaten by a mob, while protecting the office of the provost-marshal at 46th Street and 3rd Avenue. Physicians counted over 70 knife wounds. He never fully recovered.

When he returned to duty he was appointed provost-marshal of New York City, as well as superintendent of police, and continued to serve in this double capacity during the American Civil War. He made many enemies through his efforts to enforce the metropolitan excise law. He resigned on 11 April 1870, he then served as president of a street-railroad company for about two years, and then held the office of collector of assessments until his death in New York City on June 20, 1873, aged 69.

== See also ==
- New York City Police Commissioner
