= Police captain =

Rank in law enforcement

A police captain is a police rank in some countries, such as the United States, France, Thailand and the Philippines.

== By country ==
=== France ===
Shoulder straps of a French police captain.

France uses the rank of capitaine for management duties in both uniformed and plain-clothed policing. The rank comes senior to lieutenant and junior to commandant. This rank was previously known as inspecteur principal for plain-clothed officers, and officier de la paix principal for officers in uniform.

=== United Kingdom ===
In the United Kingdom, the approximate equivalent rank of a police captain is that of chief inspector.

=== United States ===
Rank insignia for a typical U.S. police captain, consisting of two yellow bars (similar to that of a U.S. Army captain) on a white shirt. Some U.S. police departments use silver-colored bars as well as a variety of shirt colors.

In most American police departments, the rank of captain is immediately above that of lieutenant. A police captain is often the officer in charge of a precinct.

In some smaller police departments, a person holding the rank of police captain may be in charge of a division (patrol division, detective division, etc.) within that department. In larger police departments, a police captain may command only one section of a precinct which is commanded by either a police major, police inspector, or the next highest rank. A police captain is considered upper-level management in most large urban police departments.

==== New York City ====
In the New York City Police Department, the rank of captain is immediately below deputy inspector. Captains are usually veterans with extensive experience.

=== Philippines ===
Philippine National Police insignia for Police Captain

In the Philippines, the rank of a police captain is equivalent to a senior inspector based on the original Philippine National Police rank under the Republic Act 6975. It has existed since 2019. It was higher than a police lieutenant, and lower than a police major.

== Notable police captains ==
- Derwin Brown
- George Gastlin
- John H. McCullagh
- Maharram Seyidov
- Jacob B. Warlow
- Eric Adams

== See also ==
- Captain
