= Thomas Woolsey Thorne =

New York City police officer

- Born: June 1823; Newburgh, New York, United States
- Died: March 20, 1885 (aged 61); Manhattan, New York, United States
- Resting place: Woodlawn Cemetery
- Occupation: Police officer
- Known for: NYPD police inspector credited for breaking up the Daybreak Boys; helped defend the New York Tribune during the New York Draft Riots
- Children: 2 children

Thomas Woolsey Thorne (June 1823 – March 20, 1885) was an American law enforcement officer and police inspector for the New York City Police Department. He is credited for breaking up the Daybreak Boys, a gang of river pirates active along the New York waterfront during the 1850s, by closing their dive bar headquarters in Slaughter House Point. He is also one of the commanding officers during the Draft Riots of 1863, in charge of the City Hall Police, and helped defend the New York Tribune.

== Biography ==
=== Early and police career ===
Born near Newburgh in Orange County, New York in June 1823, his father was a well-to-do farmer and his mother was a member of the prominent Woolsey family. He moved to New York City as a young man and worked as a house and ship carpenter. For a time, he was the assistant stage carpenter at the old Bowery Theater, now the Thalia Theater, and was involved in the construction of early steamboats on the Hudson River.

He first lived in the Thirteenth Ward and became active in Whig politics. In 1851, he was appointed a watchman for the revenue service and subsequently became a Custom House Inspector. On July 25, 1853, Thorne became an officer in the Municipal police force and was assigned to the Thirteenth Ward under the command of Captain Thomas S. Steers, father of Captain Henry V. Steers of the City Hall Police. That same year, he was elected by the rank-and-file officers to represent them when speaking to the Board of Commissioners over concerns over "an expensive and fantasical uniform". Although he himself was an early critic, he agreed to wear the new design and later became a strong supporter of the new uniforms. When the Metropolitan Police Department was formed in 1857, Thorne was among the majority of the old Municipals under then Mayor Fernando Wood who left to join the new police force.

He officially joined the Metropolitan police on April 23, 1857 as a patrolman and, within a month, he had won promotion to sergeant. He eventually left the Thirteenth Ward and was stationed in Seventh, Eleventh and Thirteenth Precincts. He became a police captain on September 16, 1861, and was posted to the Fourth Precinct. The precinct was notorious for its corruption and was referred to as "a resort of thieves and desperados of the worst kind". It was around this time that Thorne closed the headquarters of the Daybreak Boys, a dive bar located in Slaughter House Point, which contributed to the eventual break up of the river pirates and went a long way in cleaning up the New York waterfront.

=== New York Draft Riots ===
Within a year, Thorne had cleaned the precinct and was reassigned to the Twenty-Sixth Precinct, located in the basement of New York City Hall. He was still in command of the precinct at the time of the New York Draft Riots in 1863, and had five officers dress in civilian clothes to move freely among the rioters and inform of their plans.

On the first night of the riot, he set out from City Hall to relieve the besieged defenders of the New York Tribune. He was met at Printing House Square by Captain Jacob B. Warlow and his squad, returning from a tour of the New York waterfront, and decided to combine forces. With around 100 patrolmen, he and Captain Warlow led their squad against the mob attacking the offices of the New York Tribune. They attacked from the rear, quickly clearing the building of rioters and putting out small fires which had been set, and the mob fled in disorder up Park Row and into City Hall Park where they were met by another police squad under Police Inspectors Daniel C. Carpenter and John S. Folk.

=== Later career ===
In late 1866, Thorne returned to the Fourth Precinct to take over command from Captain Bryan, who had resigned his post, before returning to City Hall on July 2, 1869. Following the removal of Police Inspector William Jameson from office, on April 20, 1872, Thorne was appointed as his replacement. He held this position until May 31 when he resigned to head the Street Cleaning Bureau (predecessor to the Modern New York City Department of Sanitation). Then under the jurisdiction of the NYPD, the laws were changed a year later to allow a police officer to oversee the bureau and, on February 14, 1873, Thorne was reinstated on the NYPD being promoted from patrolman to sergeant and then captain all in one day. This was considered at the time to be the most rapid rise in rank in the history on the police force.

Thorne remained in charge of the Street Cleaning Bureau and, following his promotion to police inspector, he was assigned to the Third District after the reorganization of the inspection districts in 1875. The area then comprised the eastern half of the city above Forty-Second Street. It was while in command of the district that headed the investigation into the murder of Abraham Weisberger, a Jewish peddler, whose body had been found in Lydig's Woods. Three African-Americans, William Thomas, William Watson and Charles Ellis, were convicted of the murder and hanged at The Tombs on December 17, 1875. The Board of Commissioners credited Thorne for his conduct of the high-profile case. In riots during the summer of 1877, he commanded a 400-man reserve police force, both patrolman and mounted police, in support of Police Inspector William Murray and Captain Thomas F. Byrnes.

He was subsequently transferred to the First Inspection District and remained there until his replacement by Inspector William Murray. Returning to the Third District, on the appointment of Inspector Byrnes, the Third and Fourth Districts were consolidated and placed under the command of Inspector George W. Dilks. Thorne was then put in charge of the Third District, which comprised the west side of the city below Forty-Second Street, and remained there for the rest of his career. It was while commander of the precinct that he became concerned over accusations of illegal gambling in the Twenty-Second Precinct and, although these charges were primarily directed towards then Captain Alexander S. Williams, it was Williams acquittal of these charges that indirectly vindicated him.

Thorne had married twice, having a son and daughter from the first marriage, before marrying a wealthy young widow in 1873. His brother-in-law from the latter marriage was old time yachtman Commodore Charles Cheesebrough. Although there was no issue by this second marriage, the two lived together for the next 12 years.

In 1884, he and Captain Alexander "Clubber" Williams attended a boxing match between John L. Sullivan and Greenfield at Madison Square Garden. Under orders from Mayor Edson, Walling closed the fight and had Thorne and Williams arrest both men. On January 19, 1885, Thorne was again involved in controversy when he was assigned as the police supervisor in a boxing match between John L. Sullivan and Paddy Ryan at Madison Square Garden. He had been ordered by New York Mayor William R. Grace to stop the match "at the slightest hint of violence", 30 seconds into the first round, he "stamped into the ring, seized Ryan by the feet and ended the match".

=== Death ===
On the afternoon of March 19, 1885, Thorne left his precinct to attend a meeting with the Superintendent George W. Walling and other Inspectors. He remained on duty at police headquarters until 7:15 am when he left the building to return to his office on East Twenty-Ninth Street. On his way uptown, he stopped by the Mercer police station to visit Captain John J. Brogan. After having breakfast, Thorne finally arrived at his office and received the reports of the Captains of the Second Inspection District. He then started out for the Twenty-Ninth Street station house but fell seriously ill at the corner of Broadway and Twenty-Ninth Street.

He walked into the nearby Lindo Brothers jewelry store where he told one of the owners, David Lindo, that he felt sick. He asked for some brandy and, when it failed to revive him, a Dr. Hunt was called from West Twenty-Ninth Street. Thorne, at his suggestion, was brought to a back room while a messenger brought back a sergeant and detective from the West Thirteenth police station. He asked that his wife be sent for, however he died before her arrival 20 minutes after he had entered the store. His body was removed to his home on West Fourteenth Street. His funeral was organized by Captain Williams on his family's behalf and held in the front parlor of his home three days later. When the funeral procession began, around 1,100 policemen had formed in line stretching from Eight to Sixth Avenue. Three police battalions under Captains Theron S. Copeland, Anthony J. Allaire and George Washburn escorted his body to the Calvary Baptist Church for the funeral. Superintendent Walling, Inspectors Thomas F. Byrnes, George W. Dilks and William Murray, and Captains William H. Clinchy, Joseph B. Eakins, Thomas Killilea and John J. Mount walked alongside the hearse as pallbearers. The funeral procession included 16 carriages carrying Thorne's family and friends as well as a delegation from the Mecca Temple of the Mystic Shrine led by Potentate Walter M. Flemming. The Temple, together with the Palestine Commandery of the Knights Templar and the Eureka Lodge, later received his body for burial at Woodlawn Cemetery.
