= 1st Michigan Infantry Regiment =

1st Michigan Infantry Regiment may refer to:

- 1st Michigan Infantry Regiment (3 Months), existed in 1861
- 1st Michigan Infantry Regiment (3 years), existed 1861-1865
- 1st Michigan Sharpshooters Regiment, existed 1863-1865
- 1st Michigan Colored Volunteer Infantry Regiment, existed 1864-1865

== See also ==
- 1st Michigan Cavalry Regiment
- 1st Michigan Engineers and Mechanics Regiment
- List of Michigan Civil War units
