= Jacob B. Warlow =

American police captain

- Born: c. 1818
- Died: August 27, 1890 (aged 72); Whitestone, Long Island, New York, US
- Known for: NYPD police captain who led officers during the New York Draft Riot and defended the New York waterfront and the New York Tribune.
- Children: 1

Jacob B. Warlow (c. 1818 – August 27, 1890) was an American law enforcement officer, detective and police captain in the New York Police Department. A twenty-year veteran, he led police squads against rioters on the New York waterfront and later defended the New York Tribune during the New York Draft Riot of 1863.

== Biography ==
=== Early life ===
Jacob B. Warlow became a patrolman for the Metropolitan police force around 1851. He later served as a sergeant in the Twentieth Precinct and, in December 1861, was appointed captain of the First Precinct.

=== Role in the 1863 New York draft riots ===
In July 1863, a riot occurred that commenced on the first day eligible men were drafted for service in the American Civil War, leading to rampant pillaging and destruction in New York City. This riot became known as the New York Draft Riot and was the largest civil insurrection in American history apart from the Civil War.

Upon the outbreak of this riot, Warlow led police squads against ruffians at Broadway and Amity Street and was able to clear out the area. While returning to their own district, Warlow and his unit contended with a mob on Broad Street and quickly rescued another beleaguered police unit on New Street. In their station house on Broad Street, Warlow soon received orders to defend the offices of the New York Tribune where a mob had assembled with the intention of lynching the editor Horace Greeley and setting the Tribune office on fire. Warlow and his men marched up Nassau Street and, at Printing House Square, were met by another squad from New York City Hall under the command of Captain Thomas Woolsey Thorne. The two officers decided to join forces and, with approximately 100 police officers, attacked the rear of the mob and were quickly able to clear the building of rioters, as well as put out half a dozen small fires before they could do any damage. The mob fled in panic up Park Row and through City Hall Park where they were finally confronted and dispersed by Inspectors Daniel C. Carpenter and John S. Folk. Later in the course of the riots, Warlow was instrumental in defending the Brooks Brothers clothing store, continuing to fight even after he was hit on the foot with a stone and two of his toes smashed.

Warlow was among those officers and patrolmen commended for their conduct and service during the riots.

=== Later life ===
In the next few years, Warlow served as precinct captain to other districts in Manhattan. However, increasingly poor health forced Warlow to resign his position on August 5, 1871, which officially took effect near the end of the month. He was succeeded by Sergeant John Murphy as Captain of the Seventh Precinct. He remained with the department for another five years, working as a detective under Captain James Irving at the NYPD Police Headquarters, until the police force was reorganized in 1875. Warlow died of apoplexy at his home in Whitestone, Long Island on the morning of August 27, 1890, at the age of 72.
