= 11th New York Infantry Regiment =

Infantry regiment of the Union Army

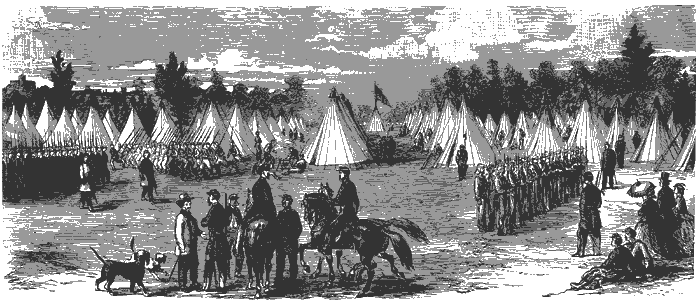
- 11th New York Volunteer Infantry Regiment at Camp Lincoln on the heights opposite the Washington Navy Yard
- Active: May 7, 1861 – June 2, 1862
- Country: United States of America
- Allegiance: Union
- Branch: United States Army
- Type: Zouave
- Role: Infantry
- Size: 1,079 (Note: As reported back to Adjutant General Hillhouse upon departure from New York on June 27, 1861)
- Part of: Willcox's Brigade; Heintzelman's Division; McDowell's Army of Northeastern Virginia
- Nicknames: Ellsworth Zouaves, First Fire Zouaves, First Regiment New York Zouaves, and U.S. National Guards
- Engagements: Battle of Arlington Mills; First Battle of Bull Run; Peninsula Campaign; New York Draft Riots

Commanders
- First Commander: Col. Elmer E. Ellsworth
- Second Commander (Acting): Lt. Col. Noah L. Farnham
- Third and Final Commander: Col. Charles M. Loeser

Insignia
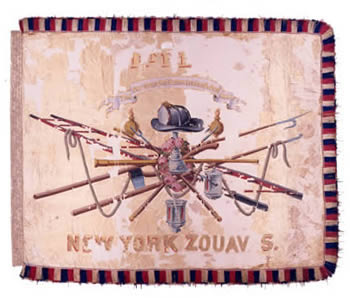
- Colors of the 11th New York

The 11th New York Infantry Regiment was an infantry regiment of the Union Army in the early years of the American Civil War. The regiment was organized in New York City in May 1861 as a Zouave regiment, known for its unusual dress and drill style, by Colonel Elmer E. Ellsworth, a personal friend of U.S. President Abraham Lincoln. Drawn from the ranks of the city's many volunteer fire companies, the unit was known alternately as the Ellsworth Zouaves, First Fire Zouaves, First Regiment New York Zouaves, and U.S. National Guards.

The unit was among the first to occupy the territory of a Confederate state when it captured Alexandria, Virginia, on May 24, 1861, less than 24 hours after the Commonwealth seceded from the Union. The regiment suffered extensive casualties during the First Battle of Bull Run during the fighting on Henry House Hill and while serving as the rear guard for the retreating Union Army.

The regiment would later be stationed near Hampton Roads during the Peninsula Campaign, but experienced little fighting. Sent back to New York City in May 1862, the regiment was mustered out of service on June 2, 1862. There were several attempts to reorganize as a light infantry regiment through the summer of 1863, and many new enlistees were involved in suppressing the New York Draft Riots but those efforts failed and the enlistees were transferred to the 17th New York Veteran Volunteer Infantry Regiment.

== Organization and muster ==
On April 15, 1861, President Lincoln issued an Executive Order calling for 75,000 ninety-day enlistments to "repossess the forts, places, and property which have been seized from the Union." That day, Lincoln wrote Ellsworth asking for his assistance in raising a regiment. Ellsworth had known the president well, from having assisted in organizing his campaign for the presidency in 1860 and received a commission to organize the 11th New York Infantry as a 90-day regiment. To the enlistees, a common yet often unknown stipulation included 90 days of service to the Federal government and up to two years of service to the state. This was not always communicated to the men who enlisted, including those of the 11th New York. (Note: The 11th's service commitment was later transferred by the State of New York to the Federal government, which ordered them to serve "for the war".)

Ellsworth's military knowledge came from a lifetime of studying military tactics, history, and manuals; and later as colonel of Chicago's National Guard Cadets. He never achieved his dream of attending West Point, as he could not gain the needed sponsorship. He was introduced to the famous French Zouaves through the teachings of his fencing instructor, Charles DeVillers, a former French Zouave. Ellsworth introduced this drill team to the flashy Zouave uniforms and drill that emulated French colonial troops in Algeria and turned the group, renamed the U.S. Zouave Cadets, into a national champion drill team. A national tour in 1860 brought Ellsworth to the attention of Abraham Lincoln, for whom the unit performed hundreds of military drill movements with their muskets and bayonets.

When a civil war seemed unavoidable, Ellsworth proceeded to New York City to recruit his own regiment from the city's volunteer fire companies, stating: "I want the New York Firemen, for there are no more effective men in the country, and none with whom I can do so much. They are sleeping on a volcano at Washington and I want men who can go into a fight now." Two days after his arrival, Ellsworth awarded officer commissions to several foremen of the volunteer fire companies and began recruiting in earnest.

Within four days, 2,300 men had answered Ellsworth's call. A selection of only the most desirable men cut that number to 1,100, which was considered a regiment's full strength. When the state could not afford to supply the new troops, fundraisers were successful in raising $60,000 for the regiment, enough to provide uniforms, several different models of Sharps rifles, and provisions.

News media covered the regiment's formation:

More work has been done in six days than seemed possible. The men have been mustered into service; the officers elected; the uniforms made, and on Sunday afternoon eleven hundred as efficient and hardy soldiers as ever handled a gun, will start for the scene of rebellion. Col. Ellsworth arrived in this city on Thursday of last week. On Friday he called together a number of the principal men of the department. On Saturday he selected his officers. On Sunday he mustered one thousand men. On Monday he drilled them.

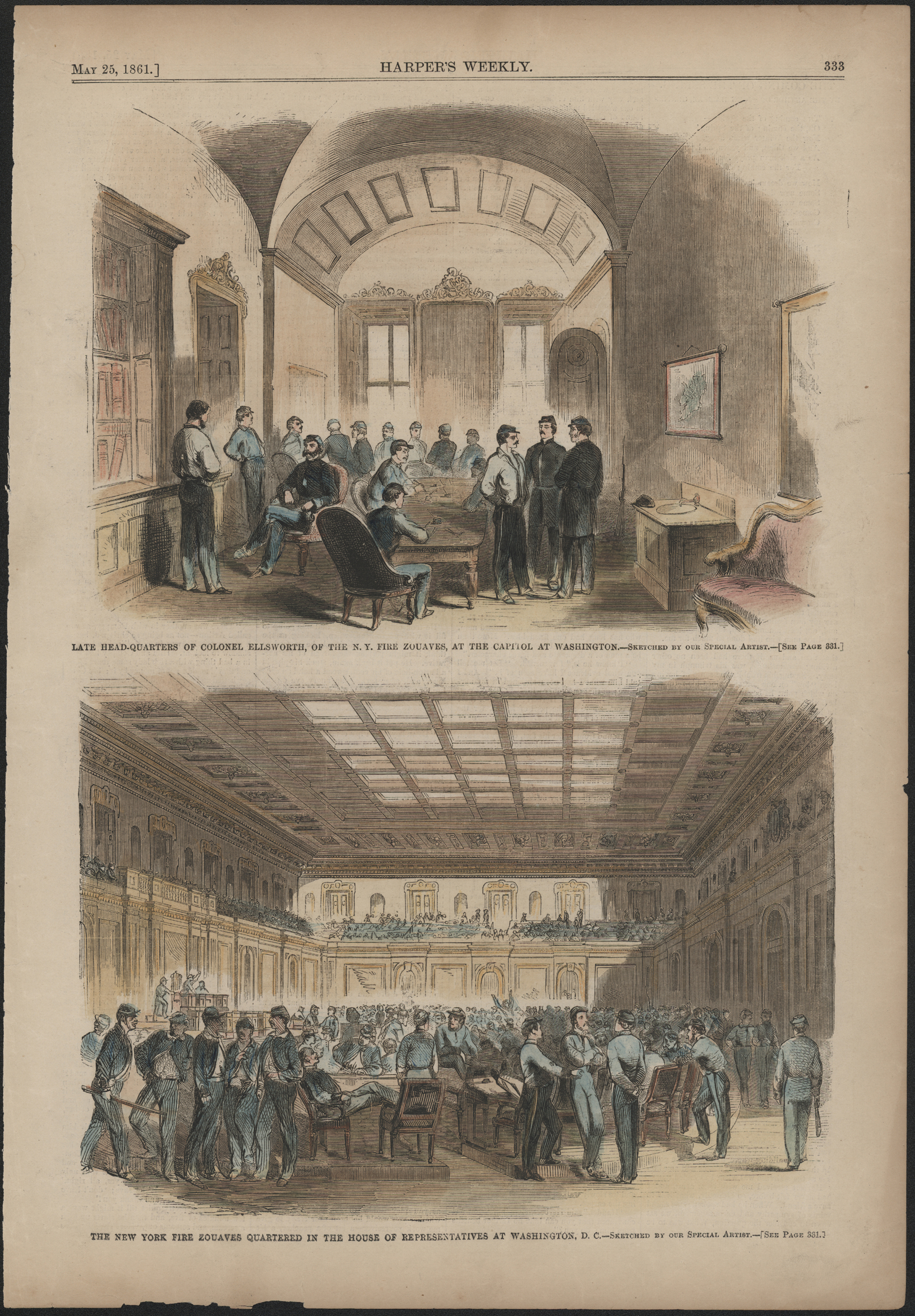
Harper's Weekly; Late Headquarters of Colonel Ellsworth, of the N.Y. Fire Zouaves, at the Capitol, at Washington. The New York Fire Zouaves Quartered in the House of Representatives at Washington, D.C., May 25, 1861.

Before the regiment departed from New York City on April 29, 1861, its members were reviewed by General John Adams Dix, Ambassador Cassius Marcellus Clay of Kentucky, as well as other members of the city and its fire department. Soon after, they marched through the streets escorted by 5,000 firemen.

Along the way, they received from the fire department a large white flag measuring 68 inches (1.7 m) by 54 inches (1.4 m) to serve as the regimental colors. Charlotte Augusta Gibbes also presented the unit with a flag. Unbeknownst to the regiment, Washington D.C. had postponed their departure because they did not comply with army regulations. John E. Wool, commander of the Department of the East, knew of the postponement, but allowed the men to embark, unaware the steamer Baltic carried no provisions. Quartermaster Arthur quickly purchased five-day rations, by paying a higher price, and hired three tug boats to catch the steamer to deliver them. The Baltic arrived in Annapolis, Maryland where the men boarded a train to Washington, D.C..

In Washington, men in the regiment broke into taverns, frightened women, swedged on meals and pursued imagined Confederates. They were returned to New York City and quartered in Battery Park. Their public antics and insubordination continued. Arthur had arrested any Fire Zouave found on the streets and jailed them on a steamer. When the number jailed reached 400 the steamer embarked to Hampton Roads where the men were banded with another regiment.

== Early action ==
The regiment arrived in Washington, D.C., on the evening of May 2. There, they completed additional training and performed picket duty throughout the district. While quartered on the floor of the United States House of Representatives, the enlisted men took it upon themselves to set up a mock session, passing a law first abolishing the House of Representatives, then the Union and reconstituting both in a manner of their liking. The more embarrassing and lawbreaking actions by the regiment included the burning of fences, which resulted in a letter of reprimand from Brigadier General Joseph K. Mansfield along with six enlisted men being removed and sent back to New York. On May 7, the 11th New York was officially sworn into Federal service by Brig. Gen. Irvin McDowell on the East Front of the unfinished Capitol in the presence of Lincoln, his son Tad and personal secretary John Hay.

On May 9, the regiment had an opportunity to apply their experience as firefighters when asked to help extinguish a blaze at the Willard Hotel. Upon receiving word from General Mansfield, commander of the Department of Washington, Ellsworth dispatched ten men from each company to attend to the fire. Soon however, the entire regiment responded to the blaze. With Ellsworth having more men on the scene than the Washington Fire Department, he claimed the fire chief's trumpet and assumed command of the incident. When the fire was extinguished, Henry Willard, owner of the hotel, invited the regiment to breakfast and money was collected providing them with $500.

After nine days quartered at the capitol, the men of the 11th New York were moved to the heights near the Insane Asylum to Camp Lincoln. This move would allow for easy transport across the Potomac and into Virginia when necessary. While just five miles (8 km) from the capitol, the standard of living the men were used to had changed dramatically, as their usual foodstuffs were replaced with beef steak, dry bread, and coffee. Ellsworth wrote to his fiancé that they had not had butter in a week.

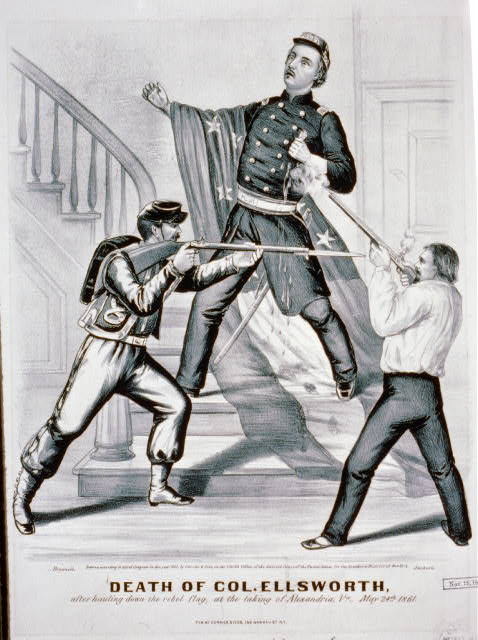
An 1861 Currier & Ives lithograph titled "Death of Col. Ellsworth"

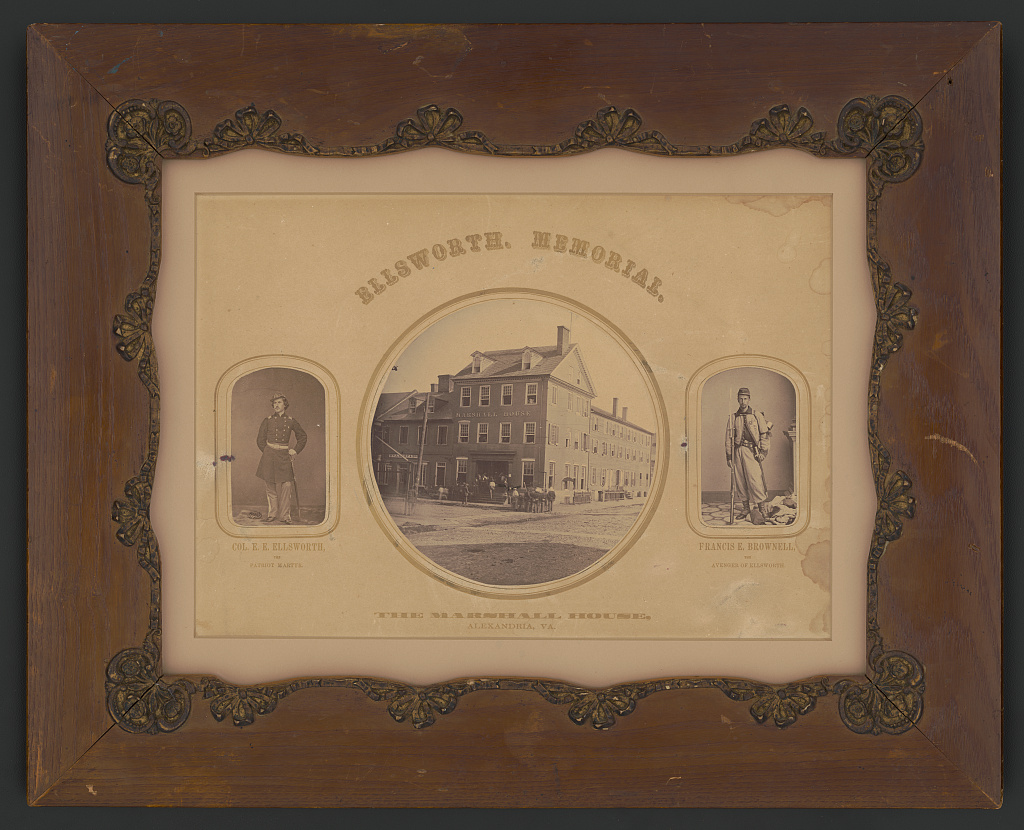
Photographs show Colonel Elmer Ellsworth of Field and Staff, 11th New York Infantry Regiment; Marshall House at the corner of King and Pitt Streets, Alexandria, Virginia, the scene of the assassination of Col. Ellsworth on May 24, 1861; and Lieutenant Francis Brownell of Co. A, 11th New York Infantry Regiment, who killed James Jackson after he murdered Col. Ellsworth. From the Liljenquist Family Collection of Civil War Photographs, Prints and Photographs Division, Library of Congress. Photographs by Mathew Brady

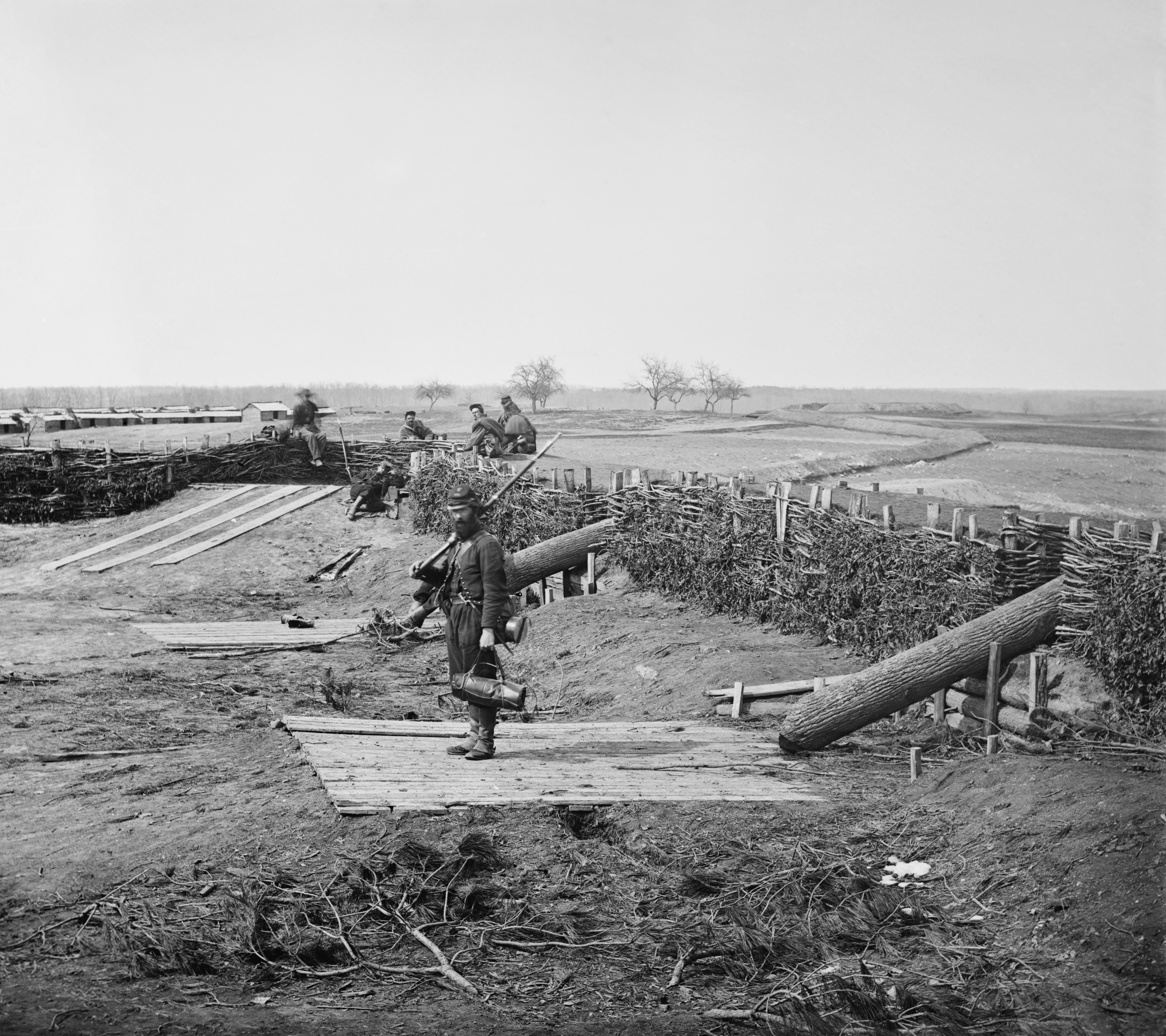
"Quaker guns" (logs used as ruses to imitate cannons) in former Confederate fortifications at Manassas Junction March 1862

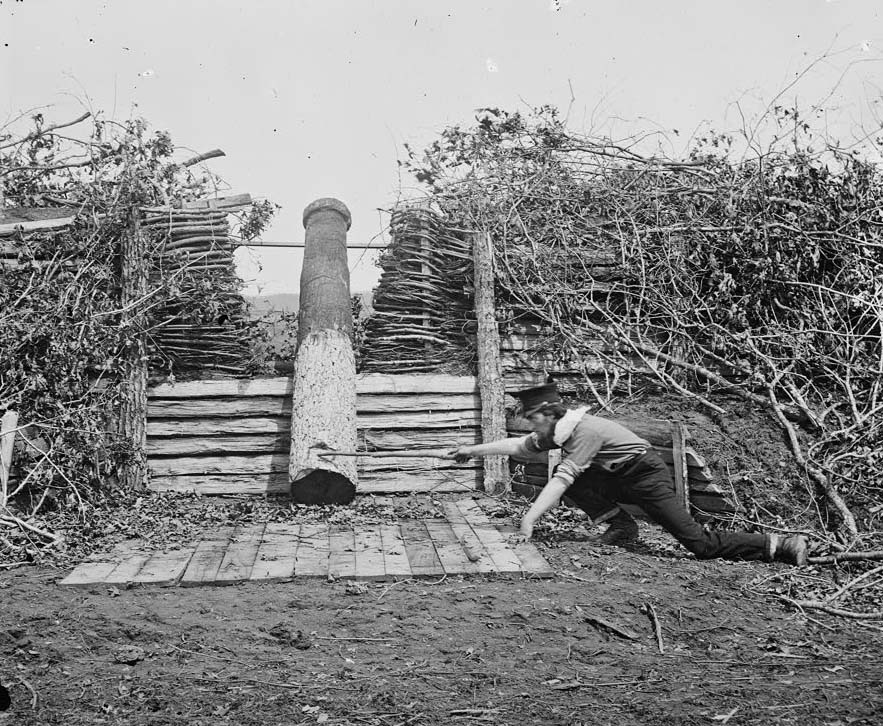
Quaker gun near Centreville, Virginia, in March 1862, after the Confederate withdrawal; a man with a stick is pretending to "fire" it with a linstock

When the Commonwealth of Virginia seceded from the Union on May 23, the regiment was ordered to assist in the occupation of Arlington Heights and Alexandria, Virginia, directly across the Potomac River from Washington. On May 24, the regiment boarded the steamers Baltimore and Mount Vernon and was transported across the Potomac, landing at the Alexandria wharves under the guard of the gunboat Pawnee. The 11th New York was one of eight to enter Virginia, and Ellsworth's men met no resistance as they moved through the streets.

After landing, members of Company E under Captain Leveridge were sent to take the railroad station, while Ellsworth, Major Charles Loeser, Lieutenant H. J. Winser and several men from Company A set out to secure the telegraph office. On the way there, Ellsworth spotted a Confederate flag atop the Marshall House inn. It was the same flag Ellsworth had seen for weeks from the White House during his visits with Lincoln. Ellsworth's group entered the inn and quickly cut down the flag, but they encountered the proprietor, James Jackson, as they descended the stairs. Jackson killed Ellsworth with a shotgun blast to the chest, and Cpl. Francis Brownell responded in kind by fatally shooting the innkeeper.

After the death of Ellsworth, Noah L. Farnham, the regiment's lieutenant colonel, was the obvious choice to take command. He was reluctant, however, labeling it an "unwelcome responsibility". His appointment was graded as temporary, he was not commissioned as the regiment's colonel and remained at rank while in its command. Regardless, he was a popular choice both with the enlisted men and in New York. One enlisted wrote in a letter home, "We have great faith in Colonel Farnham, having known him long and intimately as one deserving the confidence and esteem of his associates, and fully deserving of the position that he now occupies." Several of the officers recruited by Ellsworth, however, did not approve and caused a small controversy by resigning their commissions.

The regiment remained on guard duty in and around Alexandria until July 15, 1861, when orders were received attaching the regiment to Orlando B. Willcox's brigade, of Samuel P. Heintzelman's division, in Brig. Gen. Irvin McDowell's Army of Northeast Virginia. They were to march out the next morning. From July 16 to 21, the regiment advanced to intercept Brig. Gen. P. G. T. Beauregard's Confederate Army of the Potomac. Three of McDowell's five divisions advanced towards Bull Run, outside the railroad junction at Manassas, Virginia. The 11th New York expected to first engage Confederates at Fairfax Court House on July 17, only to find that they had pulled back towards Centreville, leaving Quaker Guns in their place. These movements were to precipitate the first large-scale battle of the Civil War.

== First Bull Run ==
The 11th New York was on the front lines for much of the fighting on Henry House Hill that occurred in the early afternoon of July 21.

Mathew Brady, upon his return from the First Battle of Bull Run July 22, 1861. Although Brady was photographed wearing a sword under his linen duster and claimed to have received the weapon at First Bull Run from the 11th New York Volunteer Infantry Regiment—see Miller's Photographic History of the Civil War Vol 1 p. 31—there is doubt as to whether he took pictures at the battle. See Frassantito's Antietam (reference only).

The Zouaves' first major combat experience occurred during the First Battle of Bull Run. On the morning of July 21, Farnham's men were awoken at 2:00 a.m. to begin their march to intercept the Confederate army. McDowell's plan for the day was for divisions under Colonel Daniel Tyler and Brig. Gen. Heintzelman to cross Bull Run at Sudley Ford, expected to be only several miles north of their camp. Poor scouting by Union chief engineer John G. Barnard resulted in a 14-mile (23 km) march for men entering battle that morning. During the march, lead units engaged skirmishers east of Sudley's Ford with artillery in the early dawn. McDowell had divided his three divisions, sending Heintzelman to the north, sweeping down to cover the Union right, and thus his was the last division to engage. The other two divisions, under Tyler and David Hunter, engaged first on the Union left and center, at Matthews Hill. With those divisions facing heavy resistance, Heintzelman's division with the 11th New York was called forward at the double-quick. One observer commented that the 11th New York looked more like firemen randomly running to a fire than soldiers marching towards the front.

As the fight moved from Matthews Hill to Henry House Hill, the 11th New York fought beside the 1st Minnesota Volunteer Infantry Regiment and a battalion of US Marines. These units were ordered to support two batteries of cannon on the Federal right flank led by Captains Charles Griffin and James B. Ricketts. The 11th New York and 1st Minnesota were directed into position at the top of Henry House Hill by Major William Farquhar Barry, McDowell's chief of artillery, and ordered to assault the Confederate line. On the initial confrontation with the 33rd Virginia Infantry on the left of Confederate General Thomas J. "Stonewall" Jackson's line, both the Union and Confederate forces were initially confused because the some of 11th New York were wearing several colors of shirts and the Virginians were clad in dark blue frock coats and dark blue trousers. The Virginians fired a volley that took down several men and the Zouaves and Marines broke and ran, but a few of the men remained.

As the 11th New York and 1st Minnesota were regrouping along the Manassas-Sudley Road, they were encountered by Confederate Colonel J. E. B. Stuart and his 150 cavalrymen. Stuart mistook the New Yorkers for retreating Confederates in the smoke and quickly rode forward, shouting, "Don't run, boys; we are here." But after seeing a color bearer passing with the United States flag, he realized his mistake. Stuart ordered a small band of "Black Horse" cavalry, led by R. Welby Carter and the men of his Loudoun Company, to charge from the right and strike the 11th's rear guard. The 11th New York saw them coming and shifted formations to meet Carter's men. The 11th's volleys quickly killed eight of the riders and wounded nine with the rest escaping back into the woods; the charge had little effect on the organization of Fire Zouaves. While repulsing the cavalry charge, Colonel Farnham was wounded, but remained on the field aided by Lt. Colonel John Cregier and Major Loeser.

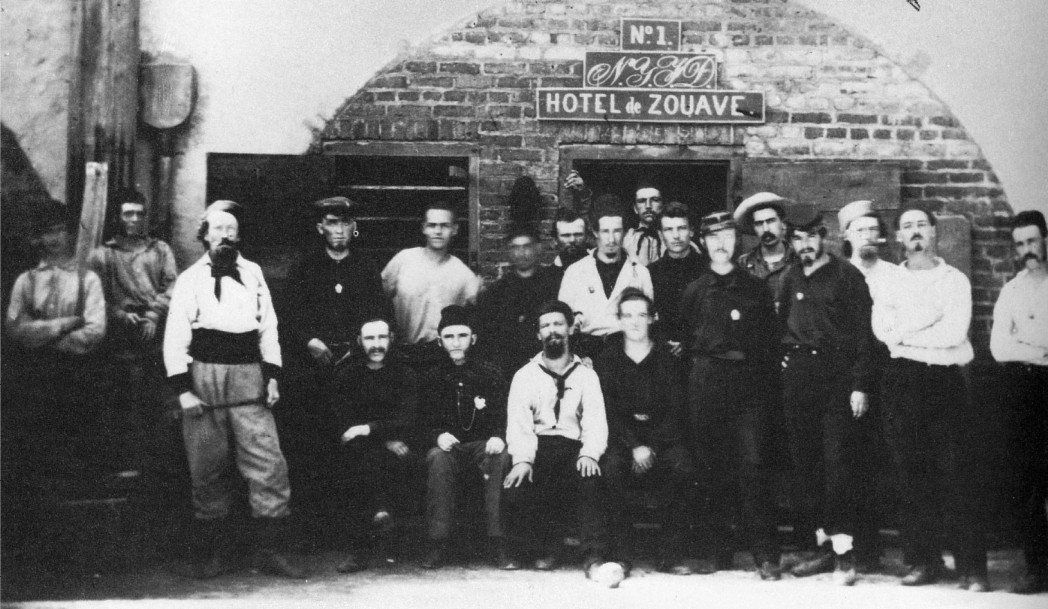
Prisoners of war of the 11th New York Infantry "Fire Zouaves" at Castle Pinckney, South Carolina.

By 2:00 p.m., the 11th New York and 1st Minnesota were joined by the 14th Brooklyn Regiment and again took their place behind the Union guns. However, soon confusion again erupted on the battlefield in front of them. As the gunners confronted the blue-clad 33rd Virginia, Major Barry ordered Ricketts to hold his fire, allowing the Virginians to charge the batteries and capture the guns. While the 14th Brooklyn was able to quickly retake the guns, the Union regiments supporting the cannon were unable to withstand the near constant barrage from Confederate artillery and infantry and fell back again to the Manassas-Sudley Road. The 11th New York, the Irish 69th New York Militia and 14th Brooklyn would charge Henry Hill four times, first in an effort to retake Ricketts' and Griffin's cannon, but each attempt failed. In the wild melee, the 69th's color bearers were killed and its colors lost, but an officer of the 11th, Captain John Wildey, was able to recapture the Irish color, and then handed it back to the grateful Irishmen.

When the order to withdraw from the field came later that evening from General McDowell, the 11th New York served as a rearguard. It was during this retreat that the regiment saw its heaviest casualties. Although accounts of the battle differ, most sources list 177 men lost at Bull Run, with 35 men killed, 74 wounded, and another 68 missing and presumed captured. Those that were taken prisoner were initially confined in Richmond. In September, they were transferred to Castle Pinckney, South Carolina, where they remained until they were paroled the following May.

== After Bull Run ==
On August 12, 1861, the remaining members of the regiment were sent back to New York City to disband, in preparation to reorganize, obtain equipment and replacements. On September 14, 1861, after reorganizing, they were ordered by Governor Edwin D. Morgan, at the request of Secretary of War Simon Cameron, to return to Virginia with two days' cooked rations. They were to be encamped at Fort Monroe on the tip of the Virginia Peninsula. Morgan must not have been quick to follow up with Cameron, as two days later Cameron sent him a cable pleading for an update, asking, "Did you send the Fire Zouaves to Fort Monroe, as indicated in your message of the 14th?"

An entry from January 31, 1862, of the Official Records places the 11th New York as a unit of the Department of Virginia at Camp Butler under the command of Brig. Gen. Joseph Mansfield. On March 8, 1862, they watched from shore as the USS Monitor and CSS Virginia dueled off the coast of Hampton Roads. Two members of the regiment were detailed to the nearby USS Cumberland and manned its cannons until they were forced to abandon ship. With manpower further depleted as a result of injury and disease, the regiment was returned to New York City on May 7. There, it was mustered out of service on June 2, 1862.

== Draft Riots and disbanding ==
On May 18, 1863, Colonel James C. Burke received authority to reorganize the original regiment as a three-years regiment to be known as the J. T. Brady Light Infantry. Burke was required to raise 250 men for the effort but failed. His authorization was revoked on June 7 and transferred to Colonel Henry F. O'Brien. O'Brien was required to raise 250 men by August 1, 250 others by September 1, and an additional 250 men by November 1. These recruiting efforts were hampered by the draft riot in New York City of July 1863.

As the 11th New York Regiment had experienced first hand, the First Battle of Bull Run in July 1861 had taken a heavy toll on Union forces, including those from New York City. As the war dragged on, a military manpower shortage occurred in the Union and Congress passed the first conscription act in United States history on March 3, 1863, authorizing the President to draft male citizens between the ages of 18 and 35 for a three-year term of military service.

Initially intended to express anger at the draft, the protests deteriorated into "a virtual racial pogrom, with uncounted numbers of blacks murdered on the streets". The conditions in the city were such that Major General John E. Wool stated on July 16, "Martial law ought to be proclaimed, but I have not a sufficient force to enforce it". States' militias and Federal troops attached to the Army of the Potomac, including the newly reorganized 11th New York, were dispatched to quell the riots. Other regiments utilized included the 152nd New York, the 26th Michigan, the 27th Indiana and the 7th Regiment New York State Militia, which arrived from Frederick, Maryland after a forced march. In addition, New York governor Horatio Seymour sent the 74th and 65th regiments of the New York state militia, which had not been federalized, and a section of the 20th Artillery from Fort Schuyler in Throgs Neck. At the height of the violence, Colonel O'Brien, the 11th Regiment's commanding officer, was seized by the mob, beaten, and killed. In the wake of the riots, the reorganization produced few recruits and stalled. On October 1, 1863, the reorganization was discontinued and the men who had enlisted were transferred to the 17th New York Veteran Volunteer Infantry Regiment.

== Aftermath and legacy ==
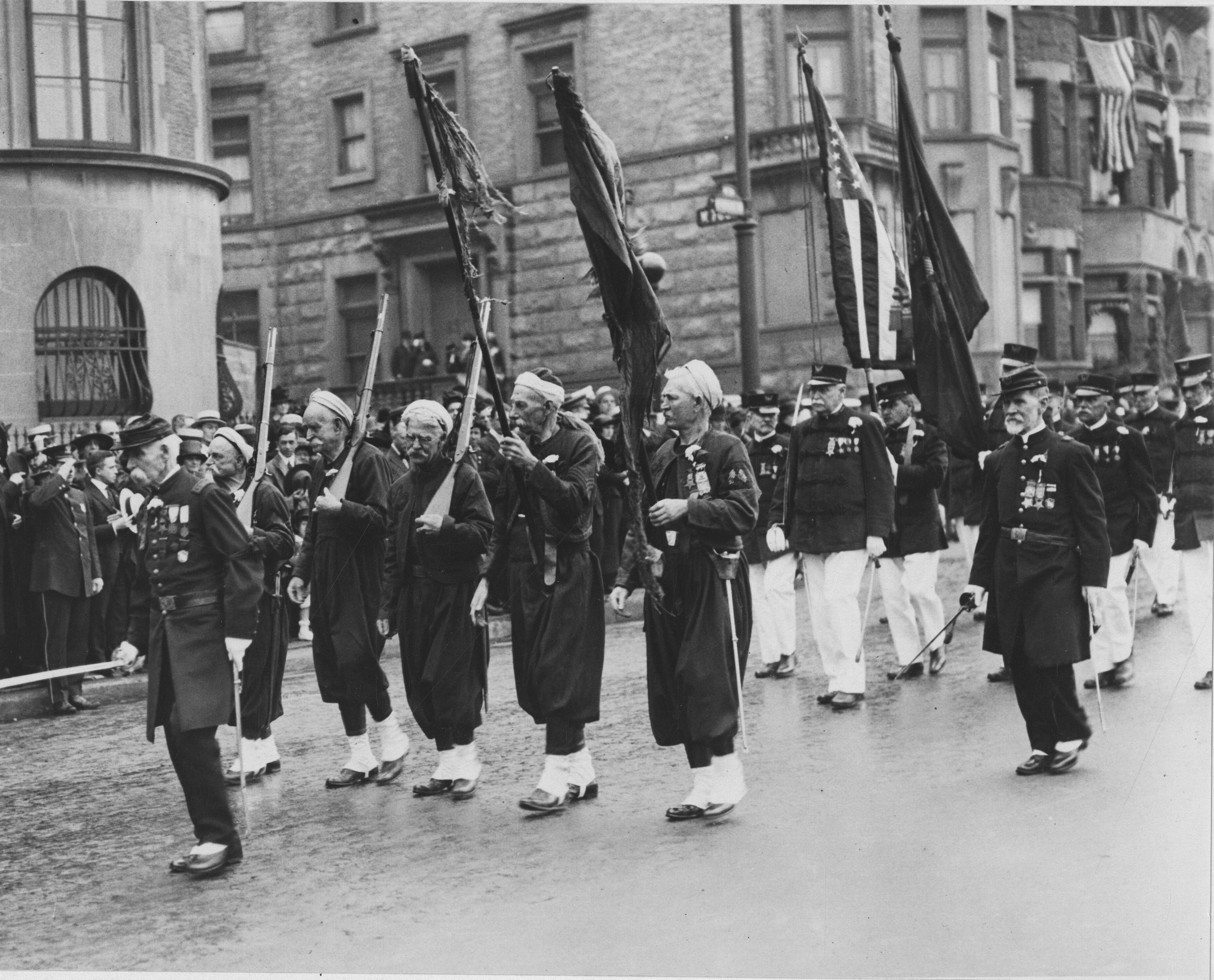
Memorial Day May 30, 1918 - Old Zouaves of 1861 marching in New York City

During its limited but intense combat experience, the regiment saw 51 members killed, including three officers and 48 enlisted men. Among these was the regiment's first commander, Colonel Elmer E. Ellsworth, who was the first conspicuous casualty of the Civil War. Private Francis E. Brownell became the first soldier in the Civil War to be awarded the Medal of Honor for his actions in killing Col. Ellsworth's murderer.

Following Ellsworth's death, Remember Ellsworth! and Avenge Ellsworth became Union rallying cries. The 44th New York Volunteer Infantry Regiment was raised by the People's Ellsworth Committee and were known as the "People's Ellsworth Regiment", or more commonly "Ellsworth's Avengers", under the command of Stephen W. Stryker, a former lieutenant in the 11th New York.

Apart from those who died of battle wounds, three officers and 12 enlisted men succumbed to disease, including its second colonel, Noah Farnham, who died as a result of his wounds sustained at Bull Run and a bout of typhoid. A total of 66 men of the 11th New York Infantry Regiment died in the course of the war.

In 1903, the flag for which Ellsworth gave his life, taken down from the top of Marshal House, was presented to the War Department by its custodian, the Ellsworth Post, Grand Army of the Republic. The flag had been carried by the regiment throughout the war and afterward maintained at their post headquarters. It was added to the war flag collection in Cullum Memorial Hall at West Point.

Historian David Detzer has argued that the fame that surrounds the 11th New York is misplaced. During its time in service, the 11th New York Regiment saw little fighting compared with other well-known regiments such as the 69th New York, 20th Maine, and 28th Massachusetts. The 11th New York was often overshadowed by the 73rd New York, also known as the Second Fire Zouaves, which fought at Antietam, Gettysburg, and Appomattox. In addition, Ellsworth failed to consider that the New York City fire companies from which his troops were drawn often competed against each other at blazes. The cohesion he sought in firefighters did not exist and would not be created when they joined the regiment. In that respect, 11th New York was no different from many regiments, North and South.

== Gallery ==
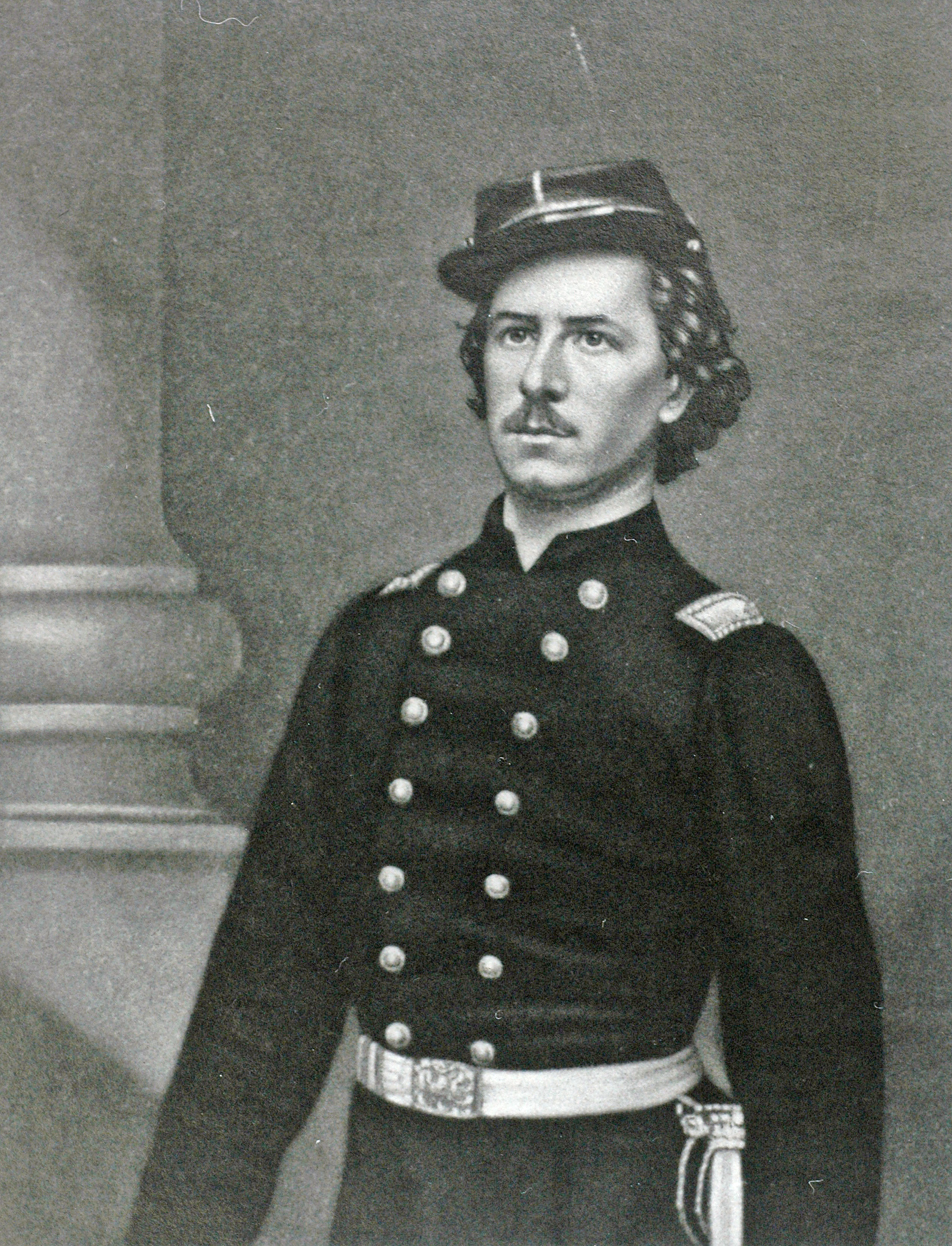
Colonel Elmer Ellsworth

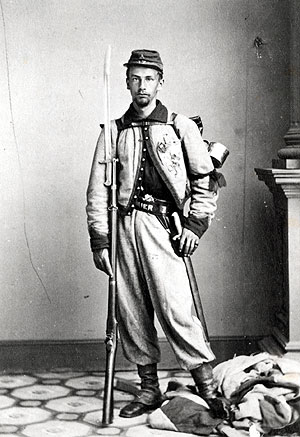
Private Francis Brownwell

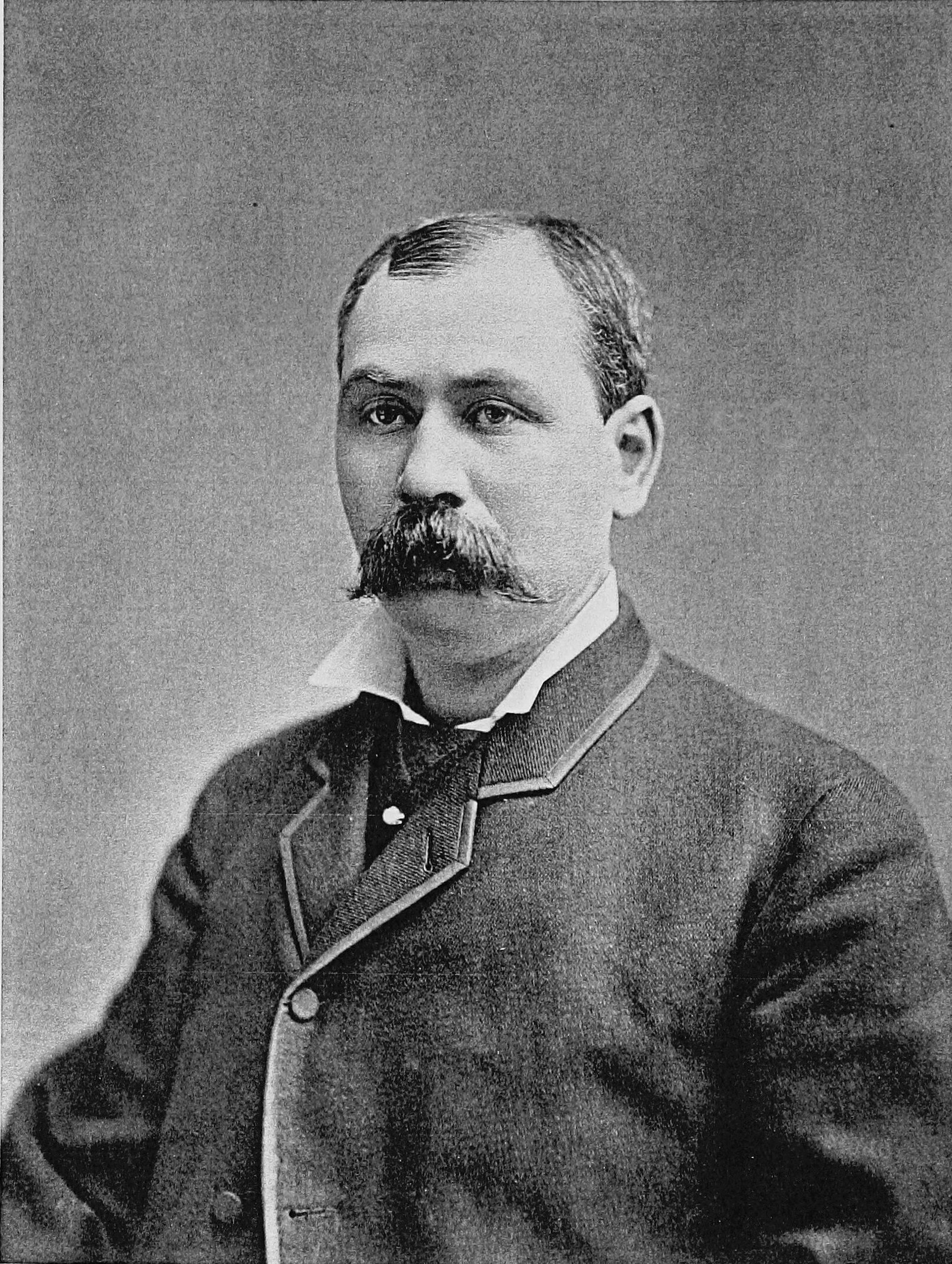
NYPD Inspector Thomas Byrnes-formerly member of the 11th NY

== Affiliations, battle honors, detailed service, and casualties ==
=== Organizational affiliation ===
Attached to:

- BGEN Willcox's Brigade, BGEN Heintzelman's Division, BGEN McDowell's Army of Northeast Virginia, to August to October, 1861
- State of New York to October, 1861.
- Department of Virginia, to June, 1862.

=== List of battles ===
The official list of battles in which the regiment bore a part:

- Battle of Arlington Mills
- First Battle of Bull Run
- Peninsula Campaign
- New York Draft Riots

=== Detailed service ===
Detailed service is as follows:

==== 1861 ====
- Left State for Washington, D. C, April 29, 1861
- Duty at Washington May 2–23
- Occupation of Arlington Heights and Alexandria, Va., May 24 (Ellsworth killed)
- Duty near Alexandria till July 16
- Occupation of Fairfax Court House July 17
- Battle of Bull Run July 21
- Duty in New York Harbor and in Westchester County, N. Y., September–October, 1861
- Newport News, Va., Dept. of Virginia, to May, 1862.

==== 1862 ====
- Hampton Roads March 8, 1862
- Duty at New York May 7 to June 2
- Mustered out June 2, 1862.

=== Casualties ===
Regiment lost during service 3 Officers and 48 Enlisted men killed and mortally wounded and 3 Officers and 12 Enlisted men by disease. Total 66. The regiment's bloodiest battle was First Bull Run.

== Armament & uniforms ==
=== Armament ===
Throughout its service, the regiment was armed with National Armory (NA) manufactured (Note: In government records, National Armory refers to one of three United States Armory and Arsenals, the Springfield Armory, the Harpers Ferry Armory, and the Rock Island Arsenal. Rifle-muskets, muskets, and rifles were manufactured in Springfield and Harper's Ferry before the war. When the Rebels destroyed the Harpers Ferry Armory early in the American Civil War and stole the machinery for the Confederate central government-run Richmond Armory, the Springfield Armory was briefly the only government manufacturer of arms, until the Rock Island Arsenal was established in 1862. During this time production ramped up to unprecedented levels ever seen in American manufacturing up until that time, with only 9,601 rifles manufactured in 1860, rising to a peak of 276,200 by 1864. These advancements would not only give the Union a decisive technological advantage over the Confederacy during the war but served as a precursor to the mass production manufacturing that contributed to the post-war Second Industrial Revolution and 20th century machine manufacturing capabilities. American historian Merritt Roe Smith has drawn comparisons between the early assembly machining of the Springfield rifles and the later production of the Ford Model T, with the latter having considerably more parts, but producing a similar numbers of units in the earliest years of the 1913–1915 automobile assembly line, indirectly due to mass production manufacturing advancements pioneered by the armory 50 years earlier.) model 1855 rifle-muskets drawn from state arsenals.

=== Uniform ===
Like most Zouave regiments, the men of the 11th New York were fashioned in uniforms not typical of the standard ensemble of a Union soldier. During their service, the 11th New York wore two different style of uniforms, the first issued during the forming of the regiment and the second shortly before the Battle of Bull Run. The initial uniforms were purchased with funds donated by the Union Defense Committee. They were based on Ellsworth's own design. They consisted of light gray jackets of a chasseur style, with dark blue and red trim along with gray trousers of a jeans cloth material with a blue stripe running down the seam, and tan leather leggings. Along with their gray uniforms, they wore red kepis with a blue band and also received a red fez with a blue tassel, military-issue shirt and/or overshirts. Many Zouaves went off to war wearing the fire badge of their respective fire company. Contrary to modern art prints, the Fire Zouaves did not go off to war wearing fireman's belts or paint mottos on their fezzes. The second uniform was issued when the first, not made of quality materials, fell apart on most men. This uniform was issued by the federal government, and to the disgust of the men, was not of the true Zouave style, but an American Zouave style. The new uniform had a dark blue Zouave jacket with red cuffs and red trimming with sky blue trimming inside the red. Blue fezzes with blue tassels were issued to provide greater flair to the uniform, as well as dark blue sashes, an issue of red overshirts (not firemen's shirts), and dark blue trousers. Before the First Battle of Bull Run, most of the Zouaves left their jackets in camp due to the July heat, however, they all retained their blue and red fezzes, and their red blue banded kepis. A number of havelocks were also issued to the regiment.

== Commanders ==
In the original organization:

- Colonel Elmer E. Ellsworth — April 20, 1861–May 24, 1861
- Lieutenant Colonel Noah L. Farnham (Acting) — May 24, 1861–August 14, 1861
- Colonel Charles M. Loeser — August 14, 1861–June 2, 1862

After reorganization:

- Colonel James C. Burke — May 18, 1863–June 27, 1863
- Colonel Henry O'Brien — June 27, 1863–July 16, 1863
- Colonel Augustus B. Sage — July 16, 1863–October 1, 1863

== See also ==
- List of New York Civil War regiments
