= William H. Withington =

American general

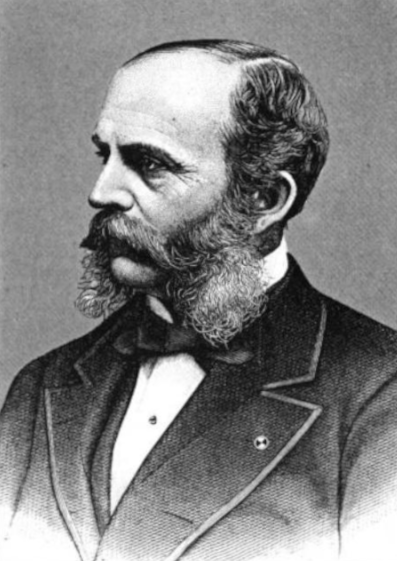

Member of the Michigan Senate from the 6th district
- In office 1891–1892
- Preceded by: Adelbert R. Chapman
- Succeeded by: Marden Sabin

Member of the Michigan House of Representatives from the Jackson County 2nd district
- In office 1873–1874
- Preceded by: Frank L. Smith
- Succeeded by: James C. Wood

Personal details
- Born: William Herbert Withington; February 1, 1835 Dorchester, Massachusetts, US
- Died: June 27, 1903 (aged 68) Jackson, Michigan, US
- Party: Republican
- Occupation: Military officer, manufacturer, politician

William Herbert Withington (February 1, 1835 – June 27, 1903) was a Union Army officer during the American Civil War.

== Biography ==
Withington's grave at Mount Evergreen Cemetery

William H. Withington was born at Dorchester, Massachusetts on February 1, 1835. He moved to Michigan and became a farm implement manufacturer.

In May 1861, Withington enlisted as a captain of the 1st Michigan Volunteer Infantry Regiment (3 Months). He was wounded and captured at the First Battle of Bull Run on July 21, 1861. He was exchanged and mustered out of the volunteers on January 31, 1862. He was appointed colonel of the 17th Michigan Volunteer Infantry Regiment on August 11, 1862. He resigned from the volunteers on March 31, 1863.

On December 3, 1867, President Andrew Johnson nominated Withington for appointment to the grade of brevet brigadier general of volunteers, to rank from March 13, 1865, for his service at the Battle of South Mountain, and the United States Senate confirmed the appointment on February 14, 1868.

After the war, Withington founded the Withington and Cooley Manufacturing Company, a maker of agricultural implements, in Jackson, Michigan. Withington served in the Michigan House of Representatives from 1873 to 1874 representing the Jackson County 2nd district, and the Michigan State Senate from 1891 to 1892 representing the 6th district. He was a Republican.

On January 7, 1895, Withington was awarded the Medal of Honor for his actions at the First Battle of Bull Run where he remained on the field and took command from his wounded superior officer, Orlando B. Willcox, until he too was wounded and eventually captured.

Withington was a companion of the Michigan Commandery of the Military Order of the Loyal Legion of the United States.

William H. Withington died at Jackson, Michigan, June 27, 1903. He was buried at Mount Evergreen Cemetery in Jackson.

== See also ==
- List of American Civil War Medal of Honor recipients: T–Z
- List of American Civil War brevet generals (Union)
