= John G. Bergen =

American public servant and New York City Police Commissioner

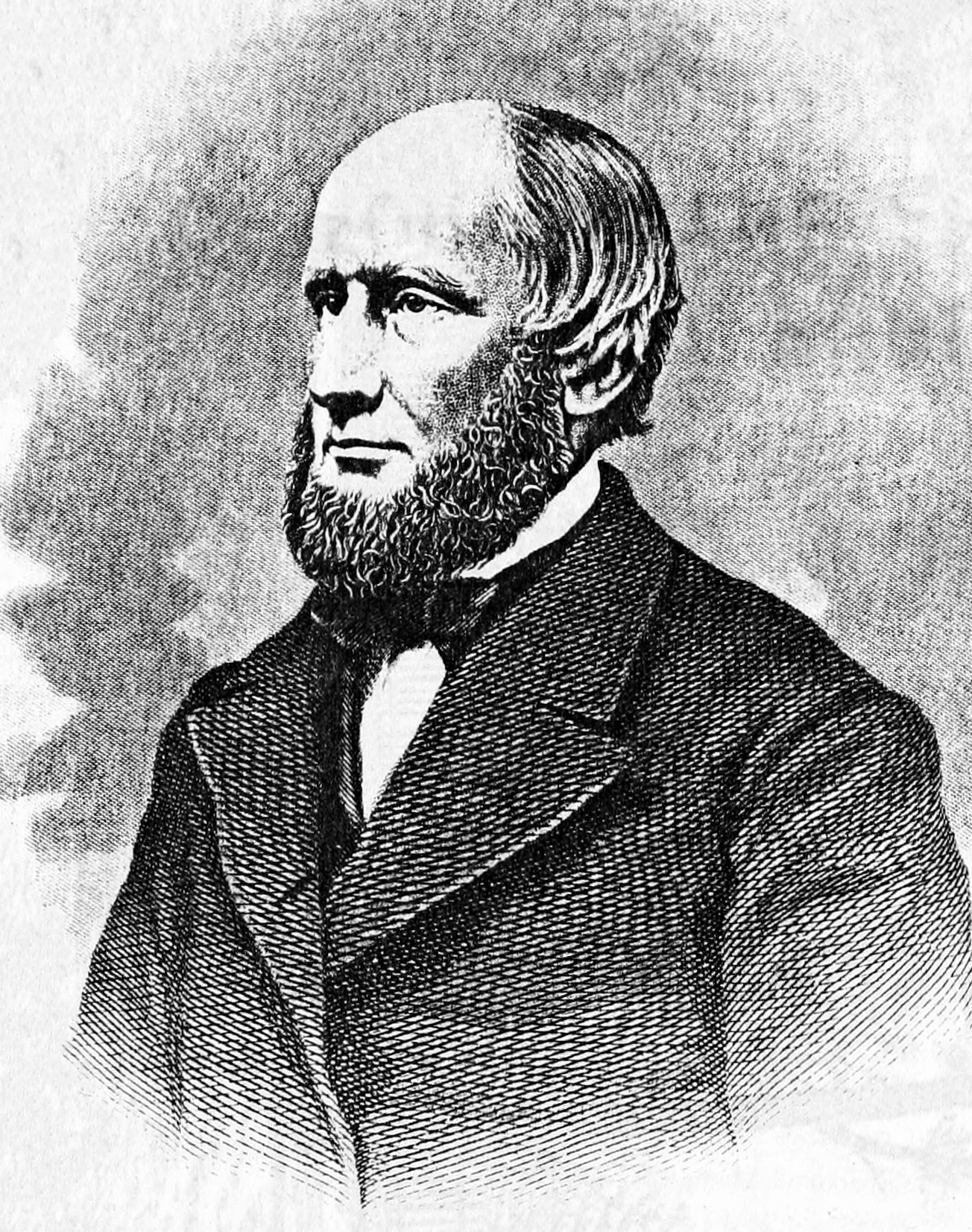
- Born: December 4, 1814; South Brooklyn, New York, United States
- Died: July 8, 1867 (aged 52); South Brooklyn, New York
- Resting place: Greenwood Cemetery
- Other name: John C. Bergen
- Occupations: Public servant and member of the Board of Police Commissioners
- Employer: New York City Police Department
- Known for: Appointed to the first Board of Police Commissioners; co-led the NYPD with Thomas Coxon Acton during the New York Draft Riots.
- Political party: Republican
- Parent: Garrett Bergen
- Relatives: Peter Bergen, brother Teunis Bergen, brother

John G. Bergen (December 4, 1814 – July 18, 1867) was an American public servant and New York City Police Commissioner. A member and treasurer of the Board of Police Commissioners, he and Thomas Coxon Acton assumed command of the NYPD during the New York Draft Riots after Superintendent John Kennedy was injured at the hands of a mob.

== Early life ==
John G. Bergen was born in South Brooklyn on December 4, 1814. Born into one of the few Scandinavian families to settle in New Netherland, he was a descendant of Michael Hans Bergen, one of eight children born to Hans Hansen Bergen, a native of Bergen, Norway, and his wife Sarah Rapelje, the first child of European parentage born in New York State. John G. Bergen was one of three sons born to Garrett Bergen who became prominent public servants. His brother Peter Bergen was a noted judge in Brooklyn and Teunis Bergen became a US Congressman from the Second District of New York.

== Career ==
In 1848, Bergen became supervisor of the Eighth and Ninth Wards in Brooklyn and would again hold the position in 1849 and 1850. He was a member of the New York State Assembly (Kings Co., 1st D.) in 1854; and Supervisor of Brooklyn's Eighth Ward in 1858.

=== Board of Police Commissioners ===
Upon the establishment of the Metropolitan Police Department, Bergen was appointed to the Board of Police Commissioners by Governor Edwin D. Morgan along with Thomas Coxon Acton and Superintendent John Kennedy in May 1860. He and Acton took charge of the NYPD when Superintendent Kennedy was severely injured by a mob during an inspection tour. Bergen oversaw the police in Staten Island and Brooklyn while Acton directed police and military forces in Manhattan. Bergen held his post until his death and was reportedly "always prompt, indefatigable and conscientious in the performance of his duties". He was also a strong supporter of the Republican Party but did not engage the intense political rivalry within the city government at that time.

=== Illness and death ===
Being accustomed to an active life outdoors however, his health suffered during his later years as a result of the time spent at Metropolitan headquarters. His condition gradually worsened and, by 1866, he began complaining of severe indigestion. His digestive organs became rapidly weaker over the next year, but he chose to remain at his post and continued attending meetings with the other commissioners until early July 1867. Confined to his Third Avenue home during his last few days, Bergen died with his family at his side on the evening of July 17, 1867. Police Commissioners Acton and Kennedy were also present and Kennedy later ordered the flags at all precincts lowered at half-mast until his burial.

His funeral, held at the family home, was one of the largest police gatherings in the history of the NYPD. Among those in attendance were Superintendent Kennedy, Commissioners Acton, Benjamin F. Manniere and Joseph S. Bosworth, Inspectors John S. Folk, James Leonard and George W. Dilks, Precinct Captains Brown, Elanson Wilson, Cornelius Woglom, Francis C. Speight, Theron S. Copeland, James Powers, John J. Williamson, Enoch Jacobs, George R. Rhodes, Olives B. Leich, Joel Smith and countless sergeants and other officers. The New York Fire Commissioners, Board of Surgeons and other prominent New York citizens, such as Thurlow Weed, were also present. The services were held by the Dutch Reformed Church and the eulogy performed by Reverend J.H. Manning and Reverend N.P. Pierce, and Bergen was interred at the family plot at Greenwood Cemetery.

New York State Assembly
Preceded by Nicholson P. O'Brien	New York State Assembly; Kings County, 1st District; 1854	Succeeded by Augustus H. Ivans
