= Daniel C. Carpenter =

New York City police officer

- Born: c. 1815; Albany, New York, United States
- Died: November 15, 1866 (aged 50); New York City, New York, US
- Occupation: Police officer
- Employer: New York City Police Department
- Known for: NYPD police inspector who commanded police during the New York Draft Riots

Daniel C. Carpenter (c. 1815 – November 15, 1866) was an American law enforcement officer and police inspector of the New York Police Department. He was one of earliest leading detectives on the police force during the mid-19th century and also had a prominent role in the Police Riot of 1857 and New York Draft Riots in 1863. His successful defeat of the rioters was the largest, and perhaps most crucial, battle during the riot. Fought in front of the Metropolitan Police headquarters, Carpenter's victory saved the New York financial district from falling into the hands of the rioters.

== Biography ==
=== Early life and police career ===
Born in Albany, New York in 1815, Daniel Carpenter moved to New York City as a young man and where he was engaged in jewelry manufacturing until joining the Municipal police force around 1847. Then under command of George Washington Matsell, Carpenter was appointed captain of the Fifth Ward. One of the most important posts in the city, the area was populated by many members of New York's prominent citizens. Carpenter was described as "patient, cool and inflexible" and his administration over the Fifth Ward was largely successful in keeping order and quiet. Throughout his career, he was described as "a noble, manly, unselfish gentleman - a man in all the corruption of a Great city, so far beyond suspicion that the most vindictive tongue could not breathe against him".

=== Police & Draft Riots ===
Upon the formation of the Metropolitan Police Department in 1857, Carpenter was one of the majority of officers who joined the new police force. During the Police Riot of 1857, Carpenter was reportedly able to enter City Hall and officially serve the arrest warrant to Mayor Fernando Wood and escort him to Metropolitan Police Headquarters. Becoming very knowledgeable of the New York underworld, he was eventually appointed a police inspector shortly after the police riot.

During the New York Draft Riots, Carpenter was one of the most active officers who fought against the rioters. After Superintendent John Kennedy was attacked by a mob and hospitalized, overall command of the police force fell to Commissioner Thomas Coxon Acton and John G. Bergen while Carpenter took command of police squads on the streets. His most memorable action during the riot was the defense of the New York financial district and the U.S. sub-treasury. With drillmaster Sergeant Theron S. Copeland, he assembled what remained of the police force, which was then about 125 men, and in a brief speech to the officers said "We are going to put down a mob, and we will take no prisoners". Carpenter and Copeland then led the small squad through Mulberry and Bleecker Streets until meeting the thousands of rioters marching down Broadway. Although both sides were armed with clubs, the male and female rioters also possessed crowbars, swords and pistols. The mob, which numbered as much as 10,000 rioters, reportedly filled up the street from corner to corner and with the head of the mob carrying an American flag and a large sign with "No Draft" written on it.

He deployed his men in four lines of skirmishers across Broadway, and marching northward, made contact with rioters at Amity Street just south of La Farge House where rioters were attacking negro servants. Carpenter led the first assault, supported by Patrolman Doyle and Thompson, and supposedly killed the first thug which challenged him with a bludgeon. Patrolman Thompson seized the American flag while Doyle killed the rioter holding the "No Draft" sign. The front rank of the mob had been halted for a moment but soon responded by throwing brickbats and paving stones. Several officers were seriously wounded in the assault, but the rest of the squad closed ranks and continued their march clubbing rioters with each step. The mob gradually began to give way and, after 15 minutes of heavy fighting, the rioters broke and scattered in all direction with officers following them into sidestreets while the dead and wounded lay on the streets and sidewalks. This was the farthest the rioters would advance, the remaining mobs being confined to central Manhattan.

He and Inspector John S. Folk also faced the rioters who had fled from the New York Tribune after being driven away by Captain Warlow and Captain Thorne. Sweeping City Hall Park of the remaining rioters, Folk returned to Brooklyn while Carpenter left behind 50 men to guard the New York Tribune offices while he and the rest of the squad went on to other threatened parts of the city. He was later joined by Captain John J. Jourdan who made a tour of the notorious Fourth Ward and the waterfront district.

On the second day of the riot, at about 6:00 am, Carpenter left Metropolitan headquarters with a squad of 200 officers and marched uptown where rioters had appeared on Second Avenue and were threatening the Union Steam Works. Moving the detachment into Second Avenue a block below the Union Steam Works, Carpenter once again deployed his men into lines of skirmishers with two lines of men marching slowly northward. The rioters, who had grown even more confrontational towards the police, were now armed with muskets, pistols and swords while others invaded nearby homes and buildings to throw bricks and stones from the rooftops. The police met little resistance at first ut were then met at Thirty-Second Street by a shower of brink and stone into the squad injuring many police officers. The mob had been slowly closing in from behind, surprised the police by attacking from the front and rear, but Carpenter and his men fought so fiercely that they managed to clear the street after 15 minutes of fighting. With the frightened mob huddled in small groups a hundred feet from the police, Carpenter ordered 50 of his men into the surrounding buildings to chase out the rooftop rioters. Many of the rioters fell from the roofs and were killed while others who managed to escape into the street were caught by Carpenter and his men. It was during this engagement that a nearby saloon was taken over by rioters armed with muskets and pistols, but Carpenter's men were able to force them out without any casualties.

When Carpenter saw Colonel H.J. O'Brien and 150 infantrymen, sent by Major General C.W. Sandford, he launched a second assault against the rioters. In spite of heavy fire from rioters, both from muskets and debris thrown from the rooftops, Carpenter and O'Brien were able to defeat the rioters with the help of artillery fire under Lieutenant Eagleson. After the rioters had been dispersed, Carpenter continued on to the tour the eastern part of the city and where he attacked several smaller mobs still remaining in the streets. Later that night, he and his squad arrived to clear out the Brooks Brothers clothing store after several officers had been shot and killed by rioters looting the store.

=== Death ===
On the afternoon of November 15, 1866, Carpenter was at Metropolitan police headquarters on Mulberry Street where he oversaw police preparations for the grand banquet held at the Metropolitan Hotel in honor of Cyrus W. Field. At around 2:00 pm, Carpenter left the station for his home on West Thirty-Fourth Street. He returned to headquarters after having dinner with his family however, met by Captain Lord of the Sanitary Police at the corner of Crosby and Bleecker Streets, the captain "observed a strange manner in him" and took Carpenter to his home on Twentieth Street. Carpenter rested on a sofa in the parlor while Lord had dinner. When Lord returned after eating his meal, Carpenter had become gravely ill. Both a physician and his wife were called for but Carpenter died before either arrived. He was succeeded by George Washington Walling, who eventually became police chief of the NYPD.
