= Ira Coray Abbott =

United States Army officer (1824–1908)

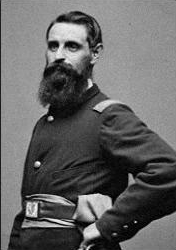
- Born: December 14, 1824; Burns, New York, U.S.
- Died: October 9, 1908 (aged 83) Washington, D.C., U.S.
- Buried: Arlington National Cemetery
- Allegiance: United States
- Branch: United States Army
- Service years: 1861–1865
- Rank: Colonel; Bvt. Brigadier General
- Commands: 1st Michigan Infantry Regiment
- Conflicts: American Civil War; Battle of Fredericksburg (WIA); Battle of Gettysburg

Ira Coray Abbott (December 14, 1824 – October 9, 1908) was named captain of the 1st Michigan Infantry Regiment on May 1, 1861. He left the active service voluntarily on August 7, 1861, but re-entered on September 12, 1861. He was promoted to Major on April 28, 1862, and to Lieutenant Colonel on August 30, 1862. Abbott commanded the regiment at the Battle of Fredericksburg in December 1862 where he was wounded. He was promoted to colonel on March 18, 1863. At the Battle of Gettysburg the regiment was attached to the brigade of Colonel William S. Tilton; which faced the Confederate attack in the area of Stony Sill on July 2, 1863. On March 13, 1865, Abbott received a brevet promotion to brigadier general for "bravery and meritorious service during the war".

== Life ==
Abbott was born in Burns, New York in 1824. In 1834, his father, a farmer, moved the family to Buchanan, MI. Abbott eventually moved to Burr Oak, MI, where he met and married Electa A. Shear in 1837, with whom he had three children who survived to adulthood. Abbott worked as a salesperson on commission for a local general store, and served as the local postmaster.

After a series of injuries during the Civil War, Abbott was transferred to a desk job in Washington D.C. until the war ended. He returned to Michigan for four years, serving as a tax revenue collector, before returning to D.C., where he was a clerk in the Bureau of Pensions for more than thirty years. Despite living in Washington D.C., Abbott stayed active in a number of organizations in Michigan, including serving as the president of the Association of Michigan Veterans.

After a summer visit to his daughter in Ontario, NY, Abbott came down with a severe cold and neuritis. He fought the illness for nearly three months before succumbing on October 9, 1908.
