= Henry O'Brien (colonel) =

United States Army officer (1825–1863)

Henry F. O'Brien (c. 1825 - July 14, 1863) was the colonel of the 11th New York Volunteer Infantry Regiment who was killed during the New York City draft riots in 1863.

As commander of the Fire Zouaves, he rallied around 150 infantry against approaching rioters in front of Oliver's Livery Stable near the East River. As police under Inspector Daniel C. Carpenter began withdrawing after fighting with rioters on Second Avenue, O'Brien arrived with two companies at 34th Street and Second Avenue.

After a brief skirmish with the rioters, the mob retreated and O'Brien left his command and walked up the avenue entering a nearby drugstore. However, after a few moments, he was attacked by a group of rioters who had recognized him as he left the building. Severely beaten by the crowd, he was kicked and hit with stones as he lay on the street, which continued for more than an hour.

Although some local civilians attempted to help, rioters attacked civilians attempting to bring him food and water. He was eventually taken by rioters to his nearby home where he was tortured to death and mutilated beyond recognition. After rioters had left, O'Brien's body was transferred to Bellevue Hospital and subsequently buried in a pauper's grave at Calvary Cemetery.
