= 1st Michigan Infantry Regiment (3 months) =

- Michigan state flag
- Active: May 1, 1861, to August 7, 1861
- Country: United States
- Allegiance: Union
- Branch: Infantry
- Engagements: American Civil War: Battle of First Bull Run

The 1st Michigan Infantry Regiment was an infantry regiment that served in the Union Army during the American Civil War. A Company consisted of the Detroit Light Guard.

== Service ==
The 1st Michigan Infantry was organized at Detroit, Michigan and mustered into Federal service for three months on May 1, 1861. The 1st Michigan was the state's only three-month regiment, raised in response to President Abraham Lincoln's initial call for 75,000 troops in April 1861.

On June 1, 1861, the unit participated in the Battle of Arlington Mill alongside the 11th New York Infantry Regiment. This battle was one of the first skirmishes of the civil war.

Their first and last major battle during their three months of service was on Jun 21st Battle of Bull Run where they would suffer 117 casualties, their commander Colonel Willcox and Captain Withington being taken prisoner (released later due to a prisoner exchange), and the loss of their Battle flag (it was returned to the state and regiment 6 years later on July 4, 1866)

The regiment was mustered out on August 7, 1861.

== Commanders ==
- Colonel Orlando B. Willcox
- Major Alonzo F. Bidwell
- Captain William H. Withington

== See also ==
- List of Michigan Civil War Units
- Michigan in the American Civil War

== Notes ==
- Detroit Light Guard of Michigan 1900
- Lineage
