= Irvin McDowell =

American army officer (1818–1885)

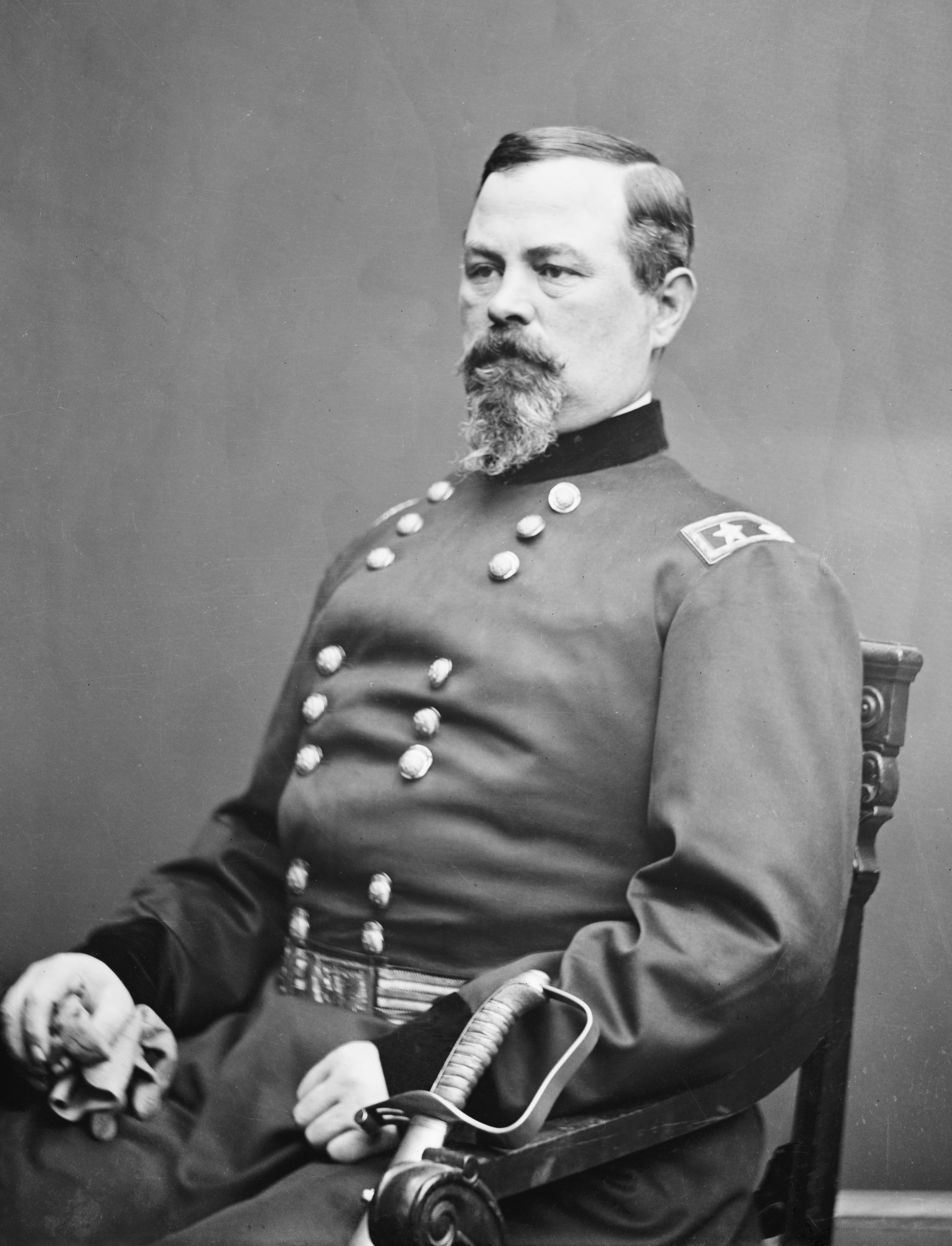
- McDowell, 1860–1865
- Born: October 15, 1818; Columbus, Ohio, U.S.
- Died: May 4, 1885 (aged 66); San Francisco, California, U.S.
- Burial place: San Francisco National Cemetery, Presidio of San Francisco
- Military career
- Allegiance: United States
- Branch: United States Army; Union Army
- Service years: 1838–1882
- Rank: Major general
- Nickname: "Squash McDowell"
- Commands: Army of Northeastern Virginia; I Corps, Army of the Potomac; III Corps, Army of Virginia; Department of the Pacific; Department of California; Department of the West
- Conflicts: Mexican–American War; Battle of Buena Vista; American Civil War; Battle of Fairfax Courthouse; Battle of Vienna, Virginia; Battle of Arlington Mills; Battle of Blackburn's Ford; First Battle of Bull Run; Second Battle of Bull Run
- Other work: Park Commissioner, San Francisco

Irvin McDowell (October 15, 1818 – May 4, 1885) was an American army officer. He is best known for his defeat in the First Battle of Bull Run, the first large-scale battle of the American Civil War. In 1862, he was given command of the I Corps of the Army of the Potomac. He fought unsuccessfully against Thomas "Stonewall" Jackson's troops during the Valley Campaign of 1862 and was blamed for contributing to the defeat of United States troops at the Second Battle of Bull Run in August.

== Early life ==
McDowell was born in Columbus, Ohio, son of Abram Irvin McDowell and Eliza Seldon McDowell, and was of English and Scots-Irish descent. He was a cousin-in-law of John Buford, and his brother, John Adair McDowell, served as the first colonel of the 6th Iowa Volunteer Infantry Regiment during the Civil War.

McDowell initially attended the College de Troyes in France before graduating from the United States Military Academy in 1838, where one of his classmates was P. G. T. Beauregard, his future adversary at First Bull Run. He was commissioned a second lieutenant and posted to the 1st U.S. Artillery. McDowell served as a tactics instructor at West Point before becoming aide-de-camp to General John E. Wool during the Mexican–American War. He was brevetted captain at Buena Vista and served in the Adjutant General's department after the war. While in that department, he was promoted to major on May 31, 1856.

Between 1848 and 1861, McDowell generally served as a staff officer to higher-ranking military leaders and developed experience in logistics and supply. He developed a close friendship with General Winfield Scott, while serving on his staff. He also served under future Confederate general Joseph E. Johnston. Salmon P. Chase supported McDowell in 1861, and several authoritative summaries attribute McDowell’s early promotion partly to Chase’s influence. At least one modern historian argues that Chase’s role may have been overstated by later writers and hostile newspapers.

== Civil War ==
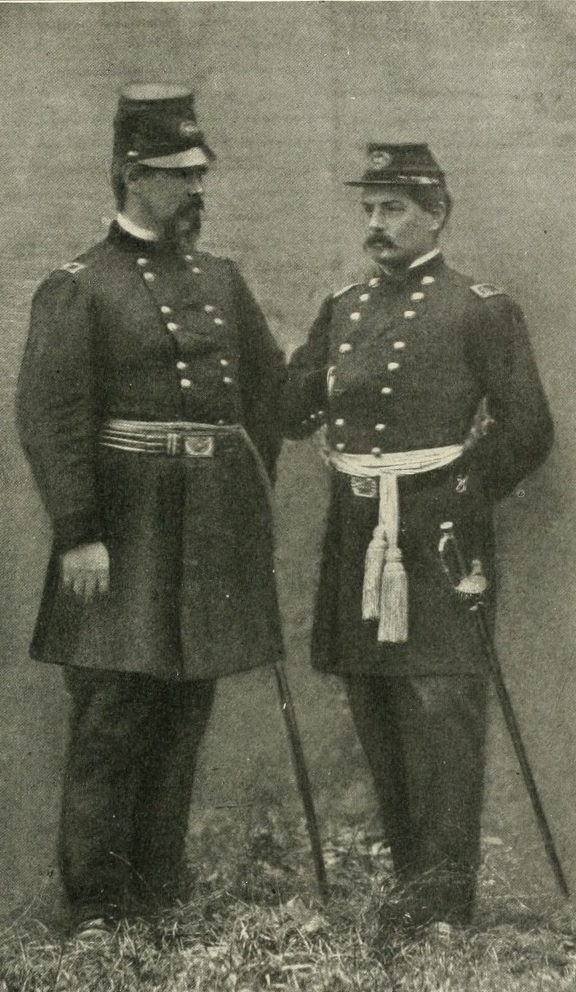
General Irvin McDowell (left) with General George B. McClellan

McDowell was promoted to brigadier general in the regular army on May 14, 1861, and was given command of the Army of Northeastern Virginia on May 27. The promotion was partly because of the influence of his mentor, Treasury Secretary Salmon P. Chase. Although McDowell knew that his troops were inexperienced and unready and protested that he was a supply officer, not a field commander, pressure from the Washington politicians forced him to launch a premature offensive against Confederate forces in Northern Virginia. His strategy during the First Battle of Bull Run was imaginative but ambitiously complex, and his troops were not experienced enough to carry it out effectively, resulting in an embarrassing rout.

After the defeat at Bull Run, Major General George B. McClellan was placed in command of the new Union Army defending Washington, the Army of the Potomac. McDowell became a division commander in the Army of the Potomac. On March 14, 1862, President Lincoln issued an order forming the army into corps, and McDowell got command of the I Corps as well as a promotion to major general of volunteers. When the army set off for the Virginia Peninsula in April, McDowell's command was detached for duty in the Rappahannock area out of concern over Stonewall Jackson's activities in the Shenandoah Valley (one division was later sent down to the Peninsula).

Eventually, the three independent commands of Generals McDowell, John C. Frémont, and Nathaniel P. Banks were combined into Major General John Pope's Army of Virginia and McDowell led the III Corps of that army. Because of his actions at Cedar Mountain, McDowell was eventually brevetted major general in the regular army; however, he was blamed for the subsequent disaster at Second Bull Run. McDowell was also widely despised by his own troops, who believed him to be in cahoots with the enemy. He escaped culpability by testifying against Major General Fitz John Porter, whom Pope court-martialed for alleged insubordination in that battle. Pope and McDowell did not like each other, but McDowell tolerated serving under him with the full knowledge that he himself would remain a general after the war was over while Pope would revert to the rank of colonel. Despite his formal escape, McDowell received no new assignments for the next two years.

A letter sent to General McDowell on March 30, 1865, by U.S treasury Salmon Chase, preserved as a manuscript at the Library of Congress, is historically significant for illuminating Chase's challenging relationship with President Lincoln and the political pressures that led to Chase's resignation from the Treasury.

== Later service and postbellum career ==
McDowell "assiduously implemented the U.S. policy of neutrality and strict denial of arms exports" during the French intervention in Mexico. His enforcement angered both French authorities and Mexican factions, who wanted access to U.S. arms. In July 1864, McDowell was given command of the Department of the Pacific. He later commanded the Department of California from July 27, 1865, to March 31, 1868; briefly commanded the Fourth Military Department; then commanded the Department of the East from July 16, 1868, to December 16, 1872. On November 25, 1872, he was promoted to major general. On December 16, 1872, McDowell succeeded General George G. Meade as commander of the Military Division of the South and remained until June 30, 1876. From July 1, 1876, he was commander of the Division of the Pacific. In 1882, Congress imposed a mandatory retirement age of 64 for military officers, and McDowell retired on October 14 of that year.

In 1879, when a board of review commissioned by President Rutherford B. Hayes issued its report recommending a pardon for Fitz John Porter, it attributed much of the loss of the Second Battle of Bull Run to McDowell. In the report, he was depicted as indecisive, uncommunicative, and inept, repeatedly failing to answer Porter's requests for information, failing to forward intelligence of Longstreet's positioning to Pope, and neglecting to take command of the left wing of the Union Army as was his duty under the Articles of War.

Following his retirement from the army, General McDowell exercised his fondness for landscape gardening, serving as Park Commissioner of San Francisco, California until his death from heart attack on May 4, 1885. In this capacity, he constructed a park in the neglected reservation of the Presidio, laying out drives that commanded views of the Golden Gate. He is buried in San Francisco National Cemetery in the Presidio of San Francisco.

== See also ==
- List of American Civil War generals (Union)

== Notes ==
Military offices
Preceded by none	Commander of the Army of Northeastern Virginia; May 27, 1861 – July 25, 1861	Succeeded by George B. McClellan
Preceded by none	Commander of the I Corps (Army of the Potomac); March 13, 1862 – April 4, 1862	Succeeded by Reorganized as III Corps (Army of Virginia)
Preceded by Himself as Commander of I Corps (Army of the Potomac)	Commander of the III Corps (Army of Virginia); June 26, 1862 – September 5, 1862	Succeeded by James B. Ricketts
