= Thomas C. Acton =

American police commissioner (1823–1898)

Thomas Coxon Acton Sr.
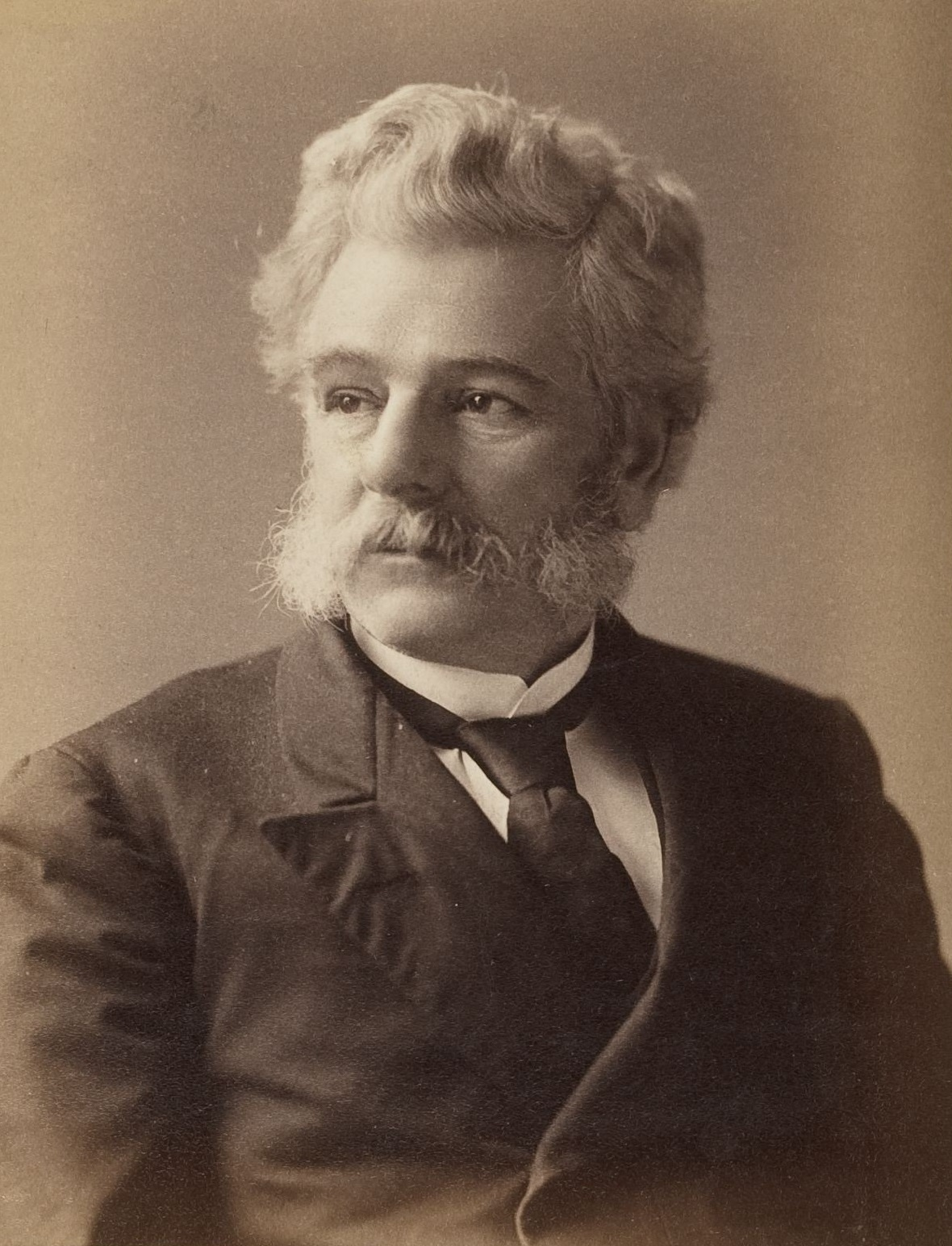

New York City Police Commissioner
- In office 1860–1869
- Appointed by: Edwin Denison Morgan

Assistant Treasurer of the United States

1st President of the Bank of New Amsterdam
- Succeeded by: Wykoff

Personal details
- Born: February 23, 1823 Manhattan, New York City, U.S.
- Died: May 1, 1898 (aged 75) Saybrook, Connecticut, U.S.
- Party: Republican
- Spouse: Sarah Elizabeth Kelsey
- Children: Thomas Coxon Acton, Jr. Agnes Acton; Sarah Acton; Caroline Acton
- Occupation: Civil servant, politician and reformer
- Known for: Political and social activist

Thomas Coxon Acton Sr. (February 23, 1823 – May 1, 1898) was an American public servant, politician, reformer, police commissioner of the New York City Police Department and the first appointed president of its Board of Police Commissioners. He and Commissioner John G. Bergen took control of the police force during the New York Draft Riots with Acton directing police and military forced against rioters in Manhattan. He served on the Board of Police Commissioners from 1860 to 1863 and as President of the Board of Police Commissioners from 1863 to 1869.

A noted political and social activist, he also held several important government positions throughout his career including superintendent of the New York Assay Office, Assistant U.S. Treasurer and, most notably, the founder and president of the Bank of New Amsterdam. It was largely due to his efforts that the modern New York City Fire Department was established replacing the outdated colonial-era volunteer firefighter system.

== Biography ==
Acton was born in Manhattan on February 23, 1823, near Washington Square Park. From a relatively poor background, he was educated in public schools and found employment as a deputy clerk under Clerk Bradford. He eventually held a position as a Deputy Register for nearly six years. He was appointed police commissioner of the old Metropolitan police district by Governor Edwin D. Morgan in May 1860 along with John G. Bergen and Superintendent John Kennedy.

Acton was made president of the Board of Police Commissioners when New York County, at the time comprising the entirety of present-day New York City, was formed. Acton held this post until the outbreak of the American Civil War a year later.

Acton temporarily re-assumed command during the New York Draft Riots when he and Bergen took over the police force after Superintendent Kennedy was incapacitated following an attack by a mob during the first hours of the riots. While Bergen oversaw actions in Staten Island and Brooklyn, Acton took charge of police forces in Manhattan. His organizational skills, working in coordination with the military, were partially responsible in bringing an end to the rioting. He received and answered over 4,000 telegrams and directed police and military forces, army officers keeping in close contact with the commissioner and referring to him for troop movements. While assuming the position of the Superintendent's office, Acton reportedly did not sleep once during the five-day period or did he leave police headquarters with exception to brief inspection tours. The strain on his health during the riots forced him to take a leave of absence from the force for the next five years.

Following his departure from the NYPD, Acton became the superintendent of the New York Assay Office and held the post until 1875. From 1882 Mr. Acton was Assistant United States Treasurer until 1886, were resigning his position, and in 1887 he organized and became president of the Bank of New Amsterdam. He held numerous government positions during his later political career as well as becoming a noted social activist and reformer. Acton was a founding member of the Society for the Prevention of Cruelty to Animals and the Society for the Prevention of Cruelty to Children, as well as a member of the New York Geographical and Historical societies. Despite years of opposition, Acton was instrumental in the founding of the modern New York City Fire Department which replaced the old volunteer firefighter service.

A strong supporter of President Abraham Lincoln and abolitionist movement, Acton was also one of the most important political activists in the city during the post-Civil War era. He was an honorary member of the Union League Club since 1864 (and Chairman in 1883) and later helped establish the Republican Party in Tammany Hall-dominated New York with the help of Marshall B. Blake and Fred A. Conkling, brother of U.S. Congressman Roscoe Conkling.

On January 3, 1882, Acton became Assistant Treasurer of the United States, having been nominated by his old friend, President Chester A. Arthur. He soon put himself in an awkward position by deciding to personally sign every gold certificate issued by the department. This required manually signing over 100,000 notes valued at between $20 and $10,000 each. He signed about three certificates per minute for weeks on end.

In 1887, he was nominated to run as the Republican candidate for the Mayor of New York City but refused to accept due to his own business dealings at the time. He would again decline to run at the next election as well. He did, however, remain an opponent to Tammany Hall and its policies. Among his personal friends were Horace Greeley and George W. Jones, editors of the New York Times and New York Tribune, respectively.

In 1896, he moved to his summer home in Saybrook, Connecticut. In failing health for some time, Acton died at 6:30 pm, at his home, from "a complication of diseases" on May 1, 1898. At the time of his death, he was still a director of the Bank of New Amsterdam. His death was attended by his wife, son and three daughters.

== Legacy ==
Over one hundred of Acton's letters documenting his career as a member and president of the Board of Police Commissioners are held in the Lloyd Sealy Library's Special Collections at John Jay College of Criminal Justice.
