= 1st Michigan Infantry Regiment (3 years) =

- Michigan state flag
- Active: September 16, 1861 – July 19, 1865
- Country: United States
- Allegiance: Union
- Branch: Infantry
- Size: 1,329
- Engagements: American Civil War: Peninsular Campaign; Second Battle of Bull Run; Battle of Antietam; Battle of Fredericksburg; Battle of Chancellorsville; Battle of Gettysburg; Battle of the Wilderness; Battle of Cold Harbor; Siege of Petersburg; Battle of Five Forks

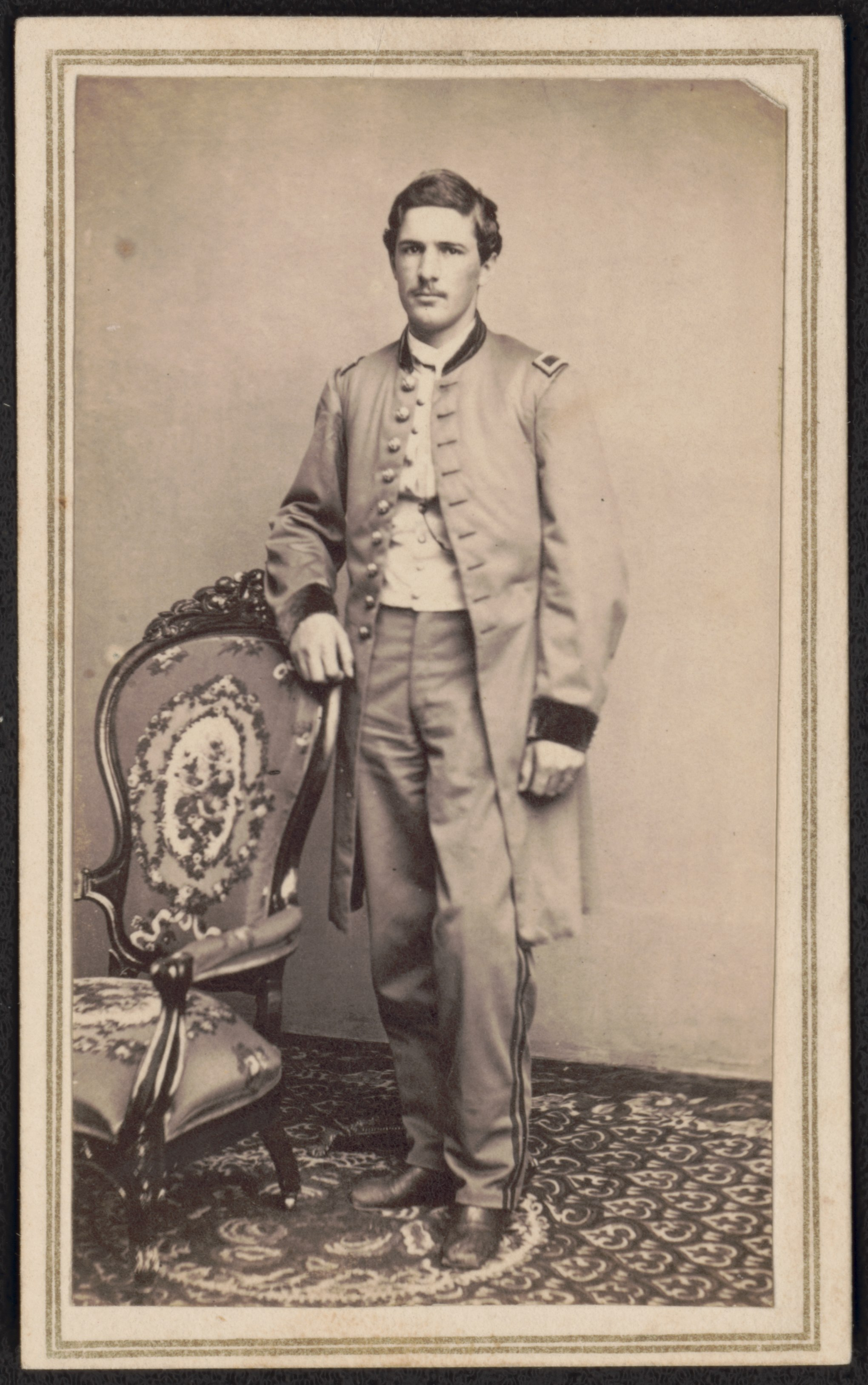
Lieutenant Francis Raymond Rice of Co. A and Co. F, 1st Michigan Infantry Regiment, before being wounded at Fredericksburg on December 13, 1862, and having a leg amputated. From the Liljenquist Family Collection of Civil War Photographs, Prints and Photographs Division, Library of Congress.

The 1st Michigan Infantry Regiment was an infantry regiment that served in the Union Army during the American Civil War.

== Service ==
The 1st Michigan Infantry was organized at Detroit, Michigan and mustered into Federal service for a three-year enlistment on September 16, 1861. This regiment retained the number of the original 1st Michigan raised for a three-month enlistment. The regiment was raised in the counties of Washtenaw, Wayne and Jackson, and reorganized in the summer of 1861 at Camp Fountain in Ann Arbor, with an initial strength of 960 officers and enlisted men. It served throughout the war as part of the Army of the Potomac, participating in every major campaign from the Peninsula to Appomattox. At Gettysburg, as part of the Fifth Corps brigade commanded by Colonel William S. Tilton, the regiment was led by Colonel Ira Coray Abbott and Lieutenant Colonel William Alexander Throop. The regiment is honored by a monument at Gettysburg, which records a total enrollment of 2,144 officers and men over the course of the war. Abraham Lincoln, upon seeing the original three-month regiment arrive in Washington in June 1861, reportedly exclaimed "Thank God for Michigan!"

The regiment was mustered out on July 19, 1865.

== Total strength and casualties ==
The regiment suffered 15 officers and 172 enlisted men killed in action or mortally wounded and 1 officer and 149 enlisted men who died of disease, for a total of 337 fatalities.

== Commanders ==
- Colonel John C. Robinson
- Colonel Ira C. Abbott

== See also ==
- List of Michigan Civil War units
- Michigan in the American Civil War
