= Theron S. Copeland =

American law enforcement officer and police captain

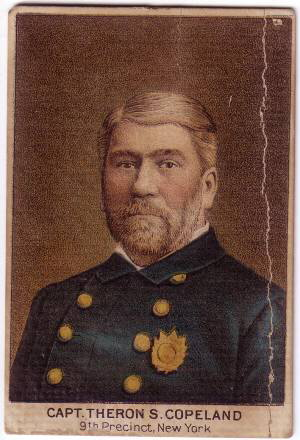
- Born: July 28, 1831; Albany, New York, United States
- Died: July 8, 1905 (aged 73); New York City, New York
- Resting place: Greenwood Cemetery
- Occupation(s): Police officer and drillmaster
- Employer: New York City Police Department
- Known for: NYPD police captain and drillmaster who served under Inspector Daniel C. Carpenter during the New York Draft Riots.
- Spouse: 2 wives
- Children: 15 children

Theron S. Copeland (July 30, 1831 – July 8, 1905) was an American law enforcement officer and police captain with the New York City Police Department. He studied military tactics at a military academy and in the National Guard before joining the police force in 1855. Much of his career was spent as a drillmaster and, during the New York Draft Riots in 1863, he was part of the force under Inspector Daniel C. Carpenter who confronted a mob intending to loot the New York financial district and the United States sub-treasury. Copeland was later named in a general address to the police force for displaying "valor and intelligent service" during the riots.

In January 1903, he retired at the rank of captain after 41 years of service. He died at Barlow Street on July 8, 1905. Survived by his wife and eleven children, his funeral was held at their home and was buried at Greenwood Cemetery.
