= John S. Folk =

American law enforcement officer

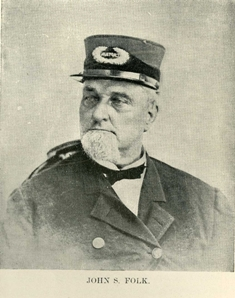
- Inspector Folk as appearing in Brooklyn's Guardians (1887) by William E. S. Fales.
- Born: c. 1811; Brooklyn, New York, United States
- Died: June 25, 1885 (aged 74); Brooklyn, New York
- Resting place: Green-Wood Cemetery
- Occupation: Police officer
- Known for: First police chief of the Brooklyn Municipal Police from 1851 to 1865, NYPD police inspector until 1870 and police superintendent from 1873 to 1875; defended both the New York Tribune and the Brooklyn Eagle during the Draft Riot of 1863.
- Children: 2 sons, 3 daughters

John S. Folk (c. 1811 – June 25, 1885) was an American law enforcement officer in New York City during mid-to late 19th century. A prominent police official during the early years of the Municipal Police Department, Folk served as the first police chief of the Brooklyn Municipal Police from 1851 to 1865, NYPD police inspector until 1870 and police superintendent from 1873 to 1875. He was also a participant in the Bread Riot of 1837, the Angel Gabriel riot of 1854 and the Draft Riot of 1863, helping defend both the offices of the New York Tribune and the Brooklyn Eagle from rioters.

== Biography ==
John S. Folk was born in Brooklyn, New York around 1811. His exact birthplace was a farmhouse which occupied the present-day site of the Municipal Building. Folk worked as a carpenter prior to joining the borough's first organized police force, the Brooklyn City Watch, during the 1830s. He remained "a trusted member" of the city watch throughout his service and, according to the New York Times, his "large and powerful frame, his undaunted courage, and his ceaseless energy made him a valuable preserver of public peace". This was especially evident in his conduct during the Bread Riot of 1837 in which he reportedly displayed "remarkable coolness, bravery, and genius for leadership" and was a key figure putting down the riot.

The city watch was then composed of officers whose members were elected and, within a short time, Folk was nominated as Head Constable. He was continuously elected to the position several times until 1851 when the Brooklyn Municipal Police was formed. He and ex-Police Chief Joel Smith were nominated for Brooklyn Chief of Police, which Folk won with a large majority, and held the position for almost 15 years. During 1854, he led police during the Angel Gabriel riot as well as violence among abolitionists and volunteer firefighters. It was while battling with firemen that Folk was nearly killed from being struck on the head with an iron wrench and carried the scar for the rest of his life. In the Draft Riots of 1863, Folk led a small police detachment into Manhattan. After helping stabilize Uptown Manhattan, he joined with Inspector Daniel C. Carpenter to relieve the besieged defenders of the New York Tribune office. After the rioters were driven from the New York Tribune, he and Carpenter trapped them in City Hall Park and broke up the mob. Folk later returned to Brooklyn where he further suppressed rioting over the next few days and saved the Brooklyn Eagle offices as well. He also protected the Plymouth Church who, with a group of 40 other officers, stood guard in the lecture room and behind the church organ as Reverend Henry Ward Beecher gave a Sunday sermon and church services.

At the end of the American Civil War, the modern Metropolitan Police Department was established by the New York State Legislature. The newly formed Board of Commissioners, which then included Brooklyn and Staten Island under its jurisdiction, appointed Folk to the rank of police inspector and gave him authority over the entire Brooklyn police force. He was eventually legislated out of office when the Brooklyn Board of Commissioners was formed in 1870, with Patrick Campbell being appointed superintendent. Two years later, Folk was made a police inspector and succeeded Campbell as superintendent a year later. He held this position until Campbell was reappointed in 1875.

Folk remained with the police force for several more years until he began suffering health problems brought on by old age. In 1885, he became seriously ill and suffered from dropsy for around two weeks prior to his death. Folk died at his Skillman Street home on the morning of June 25, 1885. A special meeting of NYPD police captains was held shortly afterwards, which included Superintendent Campbell and Inspector John MacKellar, to appoint a committee to handle the funeral arraignments. This was headed by Captains Cornelius Woglom, Henry L. Jewett and James McLaughlin. The funeral was held at Folk's home the next evening and then interred at Green-Wood Cemetery in a private burial. He was survived by two sons and three daughters. One of his sons, William H. Folk, was a noted veteran police detective and captain of the Twelfth Precinct at the time of his father's death.

A daughter, Elizabeth, was married to Samuel H. Wilson in the late 1870s, and their daughter, Vinia, was born around 1880. This Wilson-Folk marriage dissolved in December, 1891. Eight years later, Wilson married Miss Margaret D. McNeal in Newburgh, New York in June 1898. His wife Elizabeth did not remarry, and was a schoolteacher in Brooklyn until her death in 1912. Her daughter Vinia married Alexander Cruden in about 1906, and they had one son, Milton A. Cruden, an executive with Con Edison who died childless in 1967 while on vacation in Canada.
