= Orlando B. Willcox =

United States Army general (1823–1907)

Orlando Bolivar Willcox
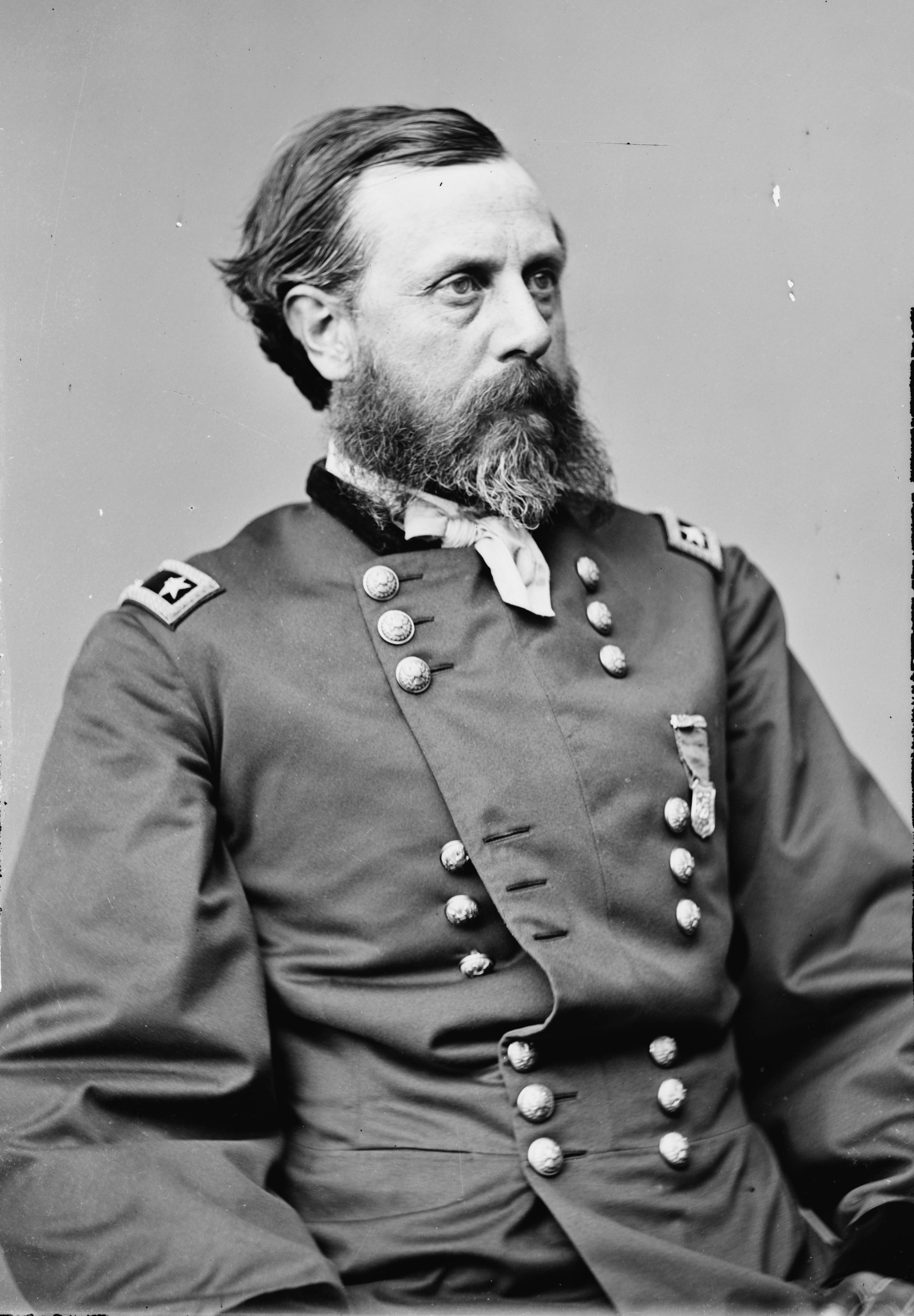
- Orlando B. Willcox
- Born: April 16, 1823; Detroit, Michigan
- Died: May 11, 1907 (aged 84); Cobourg, Ontario
- Burial place: Arlington National Cemetery
- Military career
- Allegiance: United States of America; Union
- Branch: United States Army; Union Army
- Service years: 1847–1857; 1861–1887
- Rank: Brigadier General; Brevet Major General
- Commands: 1st Michigan Infantry Regiment; 1st Division, IX Corps; 3rd Division, IX Corps; IX Corps; Department of the Missouri
- Conflicts: Mexican–American War; Third Seminole War; American Civil War: First Battle of Bull Run; Battle of Antietam; Battle of Fredericksburg; Knoxville Campaign; Overland Campaign; Siege of Petersburg
- Awards: Medal of Honor

Orlando Bolivar Willcox (April 16, 1823 – May 11, 1907) was an American soldier who served as a general in the Union Army during the American Civil War.

== Early life ==
Willcox was born in Detroit, Michigan. He entered the United States Military Academy in West Point, New York, in 1843. Following graduation in 1847, he was commissioned Second Lieutenant in the 4th U.S. Artillery. He would subsequently serve in the United States Army in various capacities over a period of forty years. Willcox served in the Mexican–American War, fought against the Indians on the frontier, and again in the Third Seminole War. Following the latter conflict, he resigned from the Army in 1857.

== Civil War ==
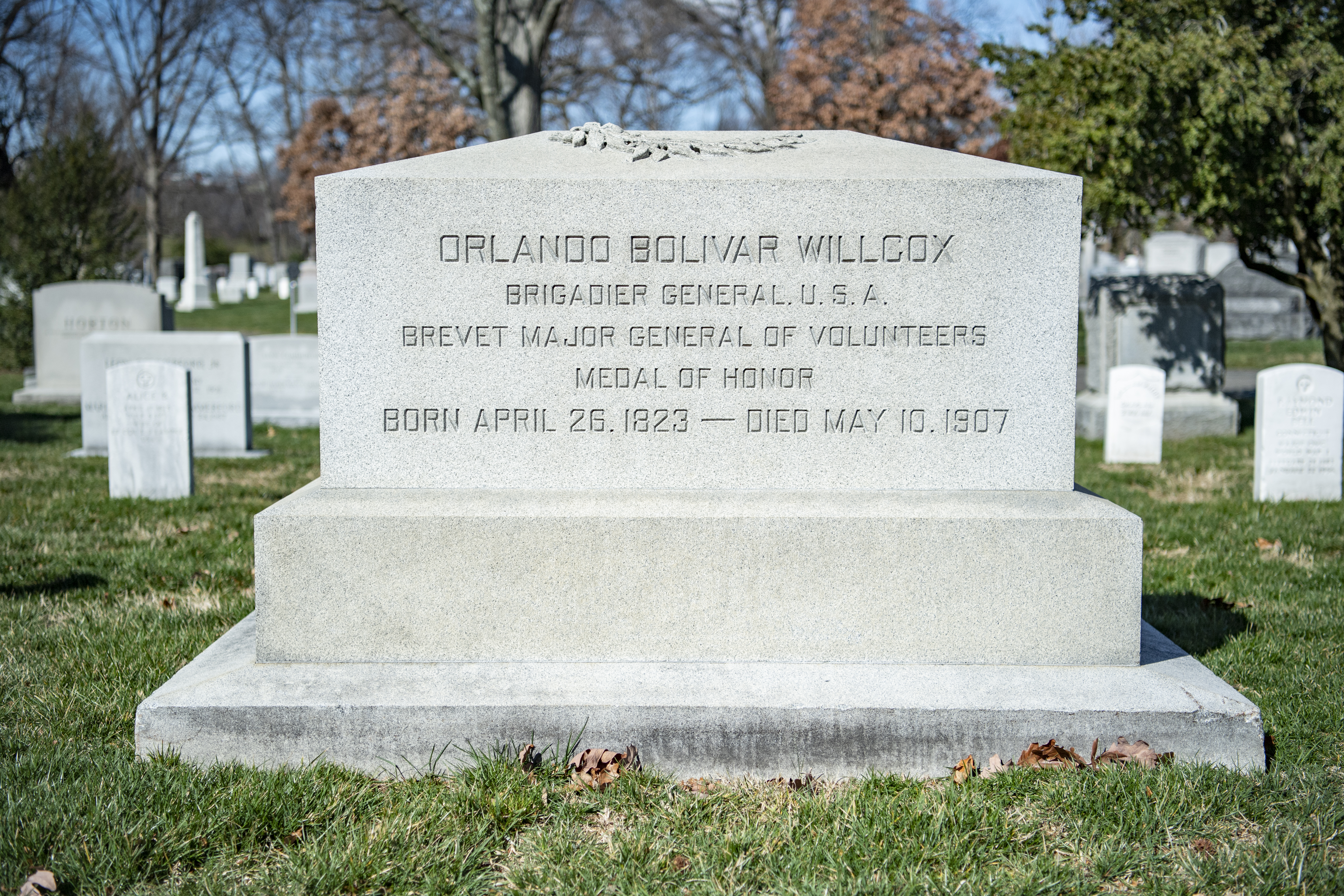
Grave at Arlington National Cemetery

When the Civil War began, Willcox was practicing law in Detroit. He was appointed colonel of the 1st Michigan Volunteer Infantry. He was wounded and captured in the First Battle of Bull Run (First Manassas) while in command of a brigade in Maj. Gen. Samuel P. Heintzelman's division. He later received the Medal of Honor in 1895 for "most distinguished gallantry" during the battle.

After his release and exchange more than a year later, on August 19, 1862, President Abraham Lincoln appointed Willcox a brigadier general of volunteers, to rank from July 1, 1861. The President had to submit the nomination three times, the last on March 7, 1863, before the U.S. Senate finally confirmed the appointment on March 11, 1863. Willcox commanded the 1st Division of Maj. Gen. Ambrose Burnside's IX Corps in 1862. He led the division at the Battle of Antietam and the entire IX Corps at the Battle of Fredericksburg.

During the 1863 draft riots, Willcox commanded the District of Indiana and Michigan. He again led a division at Knoxville and during Lt. Gen. Ulysses S. Grant's Overland Campaign. On December 12, 1864, President Abraham Lincoln nominated Willcox for appointment to the brevet grade of major general of volunteers to rank from August 1, 1864, and the U.S. Senate confirmed the appointment on April 14, 1865. Following the Siege of Petersburg, he led the first troops to enter Petersburg, Virginia, before ending the war serving in North Carolina. He was mustered out of the volunteers on January 15, 1866.

== Later life ==
Willcox returned to Detroit to resume his career as a lawyer but when the United States (Regular Army) was expanded in July 1866, he accepted appointment as colonel of the 29th U.S. Infantry Regiment.

On March 26, 1867, President Andrew Johnson nominated Willcox for appointment to the brevet grade of brigadier general, USA (Regular Army), to rank from March 2, 1867, and the U.S. Senate confirmed the appointment on April 5, 1867. Also, on the same dates of nomination, rank and confirmation, President Johnson nominated and the U.S. Senate confirmed the appointment of Willcox to the brevet grade of major general, USA (Regular Army).

Willcox transferred to the 12th U.S. Infantry Regiment in 1869 and served in San Francisco, except for brief periods, until 1878 when he became Commander of the Department of Arizona. In this capacity, he put down the raids of Apache Indians. For his service in the West, he was awarded a Vote of Thanks by the Arizona Legislature. Willcox was appointed a brigadier general, USA (Regular Army), October 13, 1886. From 1886 to 1887, he was head of the Department of the Missouri. He retired April 16, 1887 as a brigadier general. After his retirement, Willcox was governor of the Soldiers' Home in Washington, D.C. from February 27, 1889 to July 8, 1892.

General Willcox was a member of the District of Columbia Commandery of the Military Order of the Loyal Legion of the United States and the Society of the Sons of the American Revolution.

Willcox moved to Canada in 1905. He died in Cobourg, Ontario, at 84 years of age but was buried in Section 1, Grave 18, of Arlington National Cemetery in Virginia.

== Honors ==
The town of Willcox, Arizona is named in his honor.

== Medal of Honor citation ==
Rank and organization: Colonel, 1st Michigan Infantry. Place and date: At Bull Run, Va., July 21, 1861. Entered service at: Detroit, Mich. Birth: Detroit, Mich. Date of issue: March 2, 1895.

== See also ==
- List of Medal of Honor recipients
- List of American Civil War Medal of Honor recipients: T–Z
- List of American Civil War generals (Union)
