= James W. Jackson =

American secessionist (1823–1861)

James William Jackson
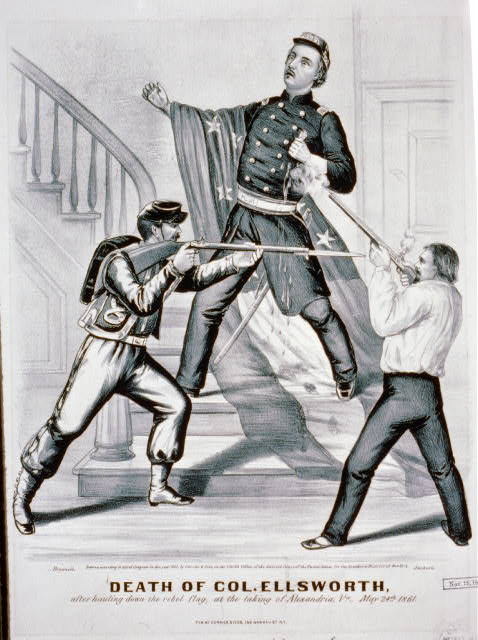
- James Jackson shooting Col. Ellsworth
- Born: March 6, 1823; Fairfax County, Virginia, U.S.
- Died: May 24, 1861 (aged 38); Marshall House, Alexandria, Virginia, C.S.A.
- Cause of death: Gunshot wound
- Occupation: Proprietor of the Marshall House
- Known for: Ardent secessionist

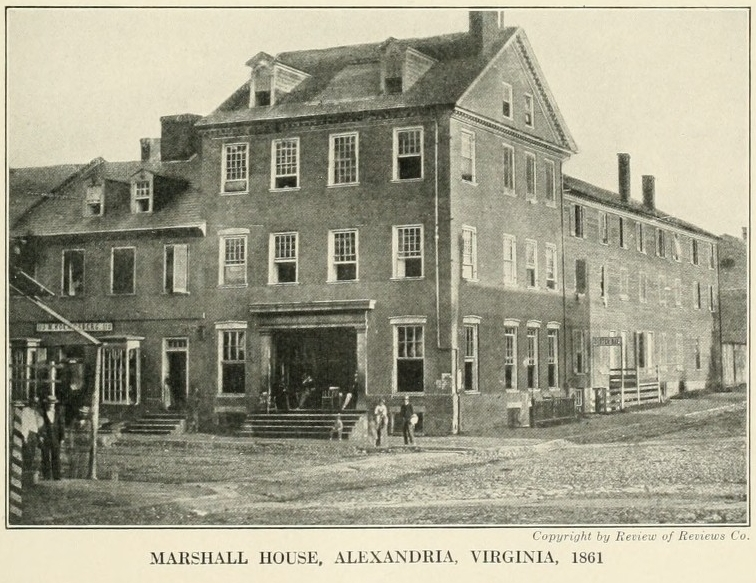
The Marshall House, Alexandria, Virginia – the place where Elmer Ellsworth was shot to death by Jackson. (photo 1861)

James William Jackson (March 6, 1823 – May 24, 1861) was an ardent secessionist and the proprietor of the Marshall House, an inn located in the city of Alexandria, Virginia, at the beginning of the American Civil War. He is known for flying a large Confederate flag – the "Stars and Bars" variant – atop his inn that was visible to President Abraham Lincoln from Washington, D.C., and for killing Col. Elmer Ellsworth in an incident that marked the first conspicuous casualty and the first killing of a Union officer in the Civil War. Jackson was killed immediately after he killed Ellsworth. While losing their lives, both gained fame as martyrs to their respective causes.

== The incident ==
During the month that Virginia voters contemplated whether to follow the recommendation of the Virginia Secession Convention, President Abraham Lincoln and his Cabinet reportedly observed, through field glasses from an elevated spot in Washington, Jackson's large Confederate flag flying atop the Marshall House inn in Alexandria, across the Potomac River. Jackson had reportedly stated the flag would only be taken down "over his dead body".

On May 24, 1861, the day after Virginia voters ratified the secession recommendation, federal troops crossed the Potomac and captured Alexandria. One federal regiment was the famously flamboyant 11th New York Zouave Infantry, led by Col. Elmer Ellsworth, who was a close friend of Lincoln.

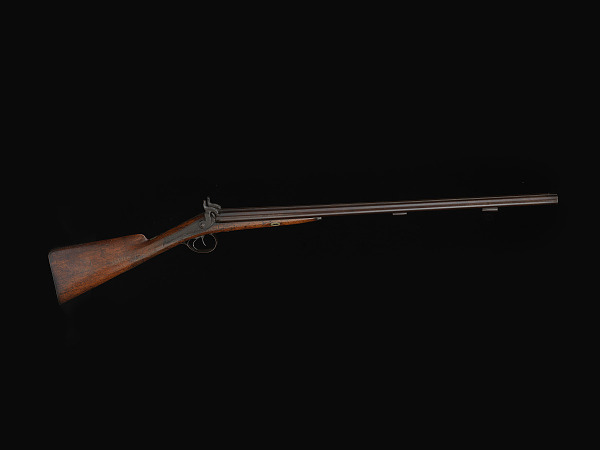
Jackson's shotgun used to kill Col. Ellsworth

When approaching the Marshall House, Ellsworth saw the flag, and went inside the building to seize it. When questioned, a boarder at the house informed Ellsworth that he knew nothing about the flag. Ellsworth then climbed the stairs and removed the flag from the flagpole. As Ellsworth returned downstairs with the flag, Jackson suddenly appeared and shot him dead with an English-made double-barrel shotgun. Then Francis E. Brownell of Ellsworth's regiment shot and bayonetted Jackson, thus killing him. Both men immediately became celebrated martyrs for their respective causes.

== Legacy ==
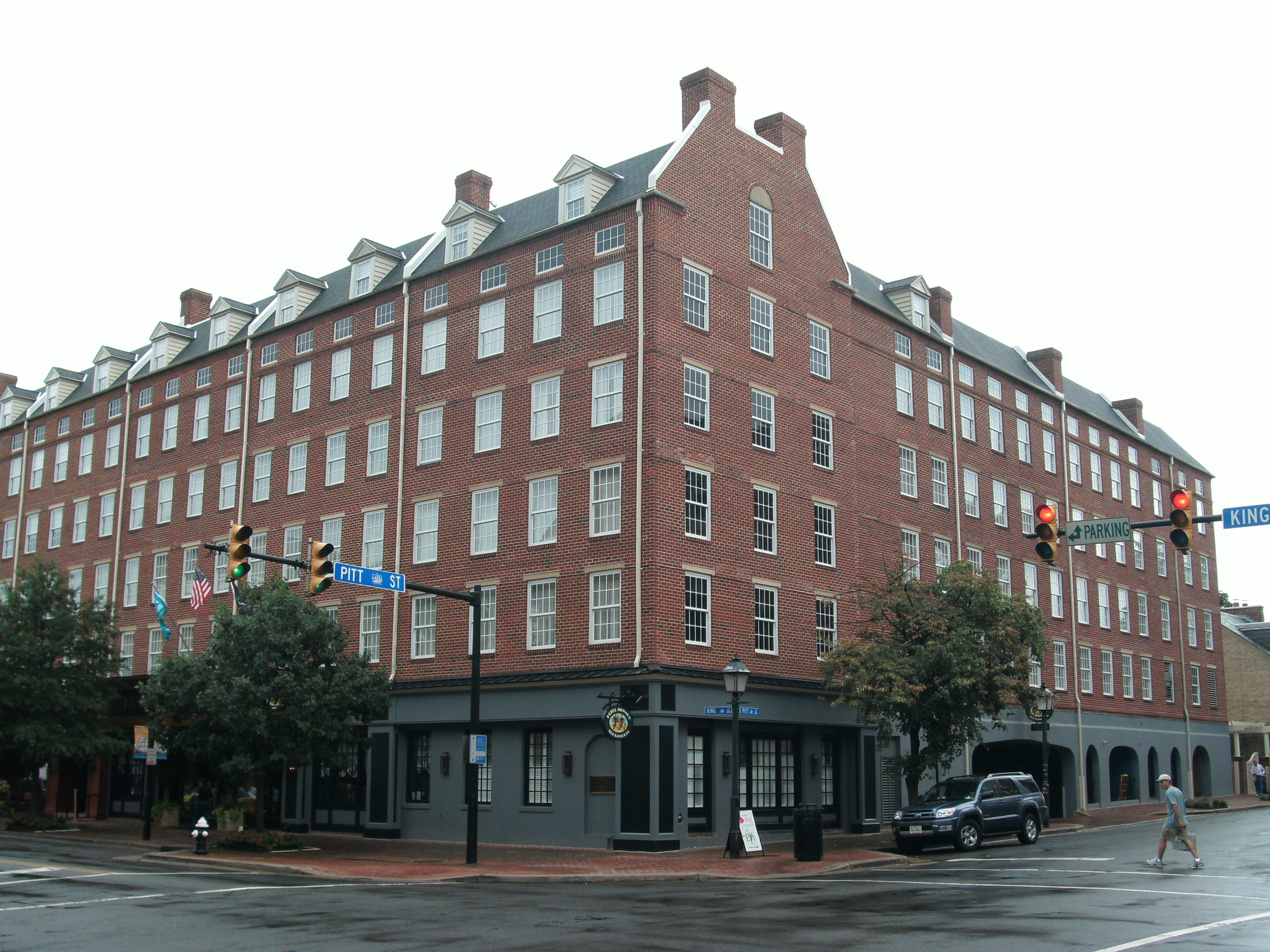
The Hotel Monaco, now The Alexandrian, on the site of the Marshall House, seen in 2009. The Marshall House plaque is visible in the foreground, within a blind arch near a corner of the hotel.

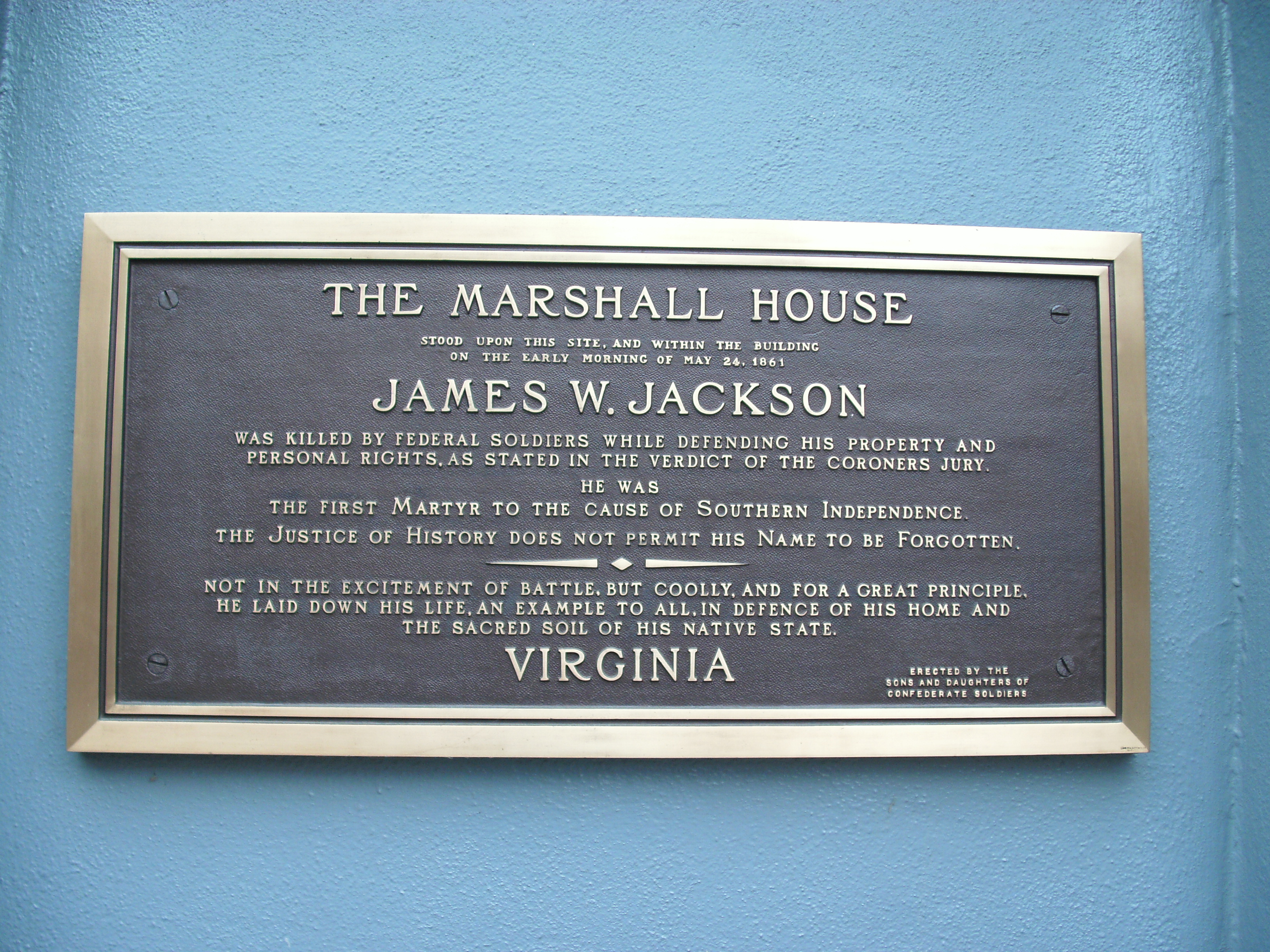
Marshall House plaque, within a blind arch near a corner of the Hotel Monaco before its removal (2009)

In 1862, an account of his death was published in Richmond, Virginia. In 1863, Union officials established a contraband camp (for former slaves) on or adjacent to or land owned by Jackson's widow in Lewinsville.

In 1999, sociologist and historian James W. Loewen noted in his book Lies Across America that the Sons of Confederate Veterans had placed a bronze plaque on the side of a Holiday Inn that had been constructed on the former site of the Marshall House. Loewen reported that the plaque described Jackson's death but omitted any mention of Ellsworth. Adam Goodheart further discussed the incident and the plaque (which was then within a blind arch near a corner of a Hotel Monaco) in his 2011 book 1861: The Civil War Awakening.

The plaque called Jackson the "first martyr to the cause of Southern Independence" and said he "was killed by federal soldiers while defending his property and personal rights ... in defence of his home and the sacred soil of his native state". In full, it read:

THE MARSHALL HOUSE
stood upon this site, and within the building
on the early morning of May 24,
JAMES W. JACKSON
was killed by federal soldiers while defending his property and
personal rights as stated in the verdict of the coroners jury.
He was
the first martyr to the cause of Southern Independence.
The justice of history does not permit his name to be forgotten.
–––––––––––––––– O –––––––––––––––
Not in the excitement of battle, but coolly and for a great principle,
he laid down his life, an example to all, in defence of his home and
the sacred soil of his native state.
VIRGINIA

In 2013, WTOP reported that some Alexandria residents were advocating the removal of the plaque, but that city officials had no control over the matter as the plaque was on private property. However, in December 2016, Marriott International purchased The Monaco, added it to its boutique Autograph Collection and renamed it as "The Alexandrian". By October 2017, Marriott had removed the plaque from The Alexandrian and had given it to the local chapter of the United Daughters of the Confederacy.
