= Travis Triangle =

Green space in Queens, New York

Coordinates: 40.766853°N 73.813088°W

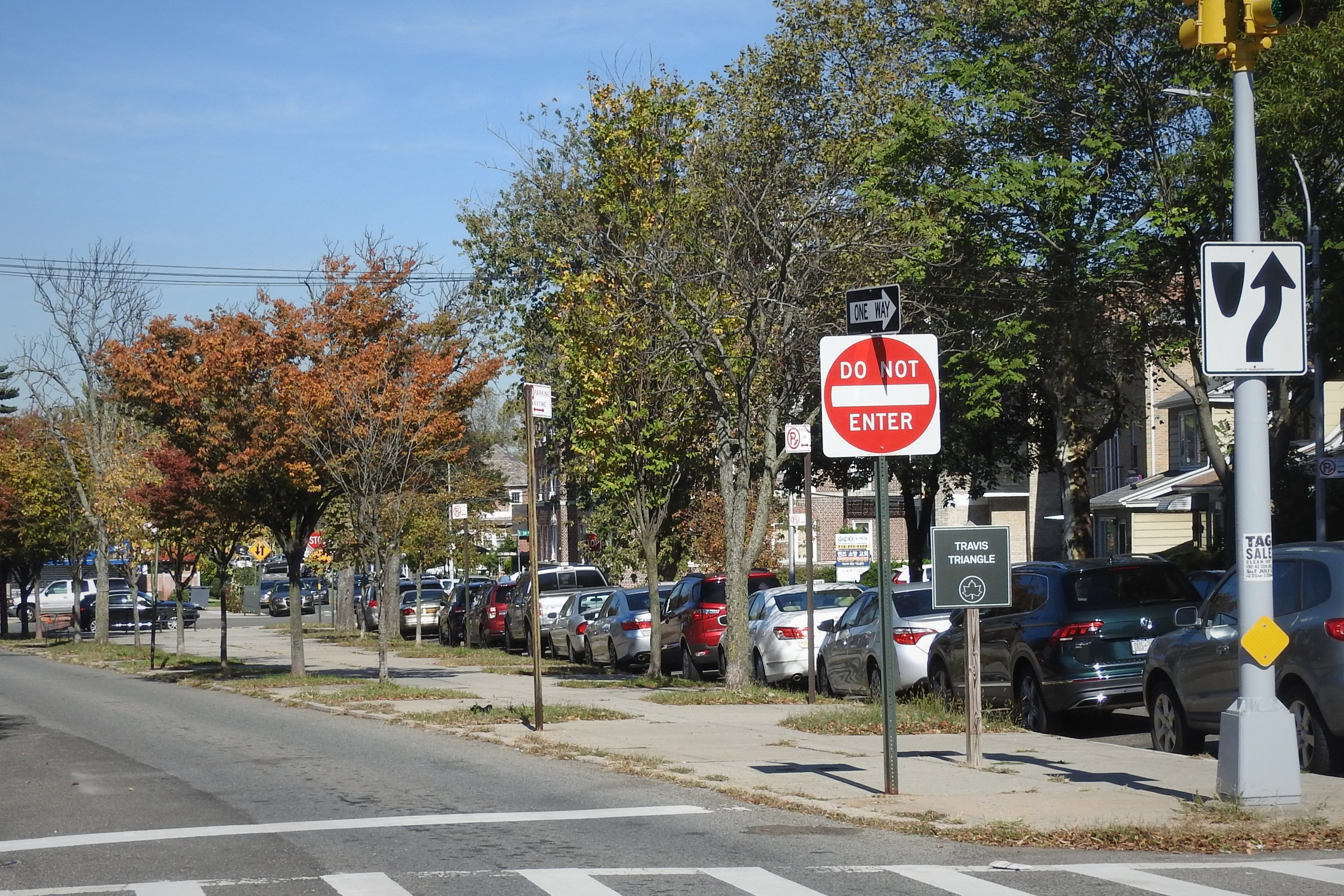
Travis Triangle in 2019

Travis Triangle is a narrow green space in the Murray Hill/Flushing neighborhoods of Queens, New York City.

== Description ==
Travis Triangle is formed by the separation of Murray Street and Murray Lane, both of which were named after the Murray family, which owned land on the site of these streets from the late colonial period through the early 19th century.

The park contains plots for 24 trees and a bench on its northern side. Continuing north, Murray Lane gradually narrows, taking on the appearance of a countryside lane, having changed little as the surrounding neighborhood transformed over a century from farmland towards residential.

With the arrival of the subway to Flushing in 1928, the neighborhood expanded to the north and east and parks were built to accommodate the new residents. Parcels that were too small to develop, such as this site, were designated as green spaces maintained by the city's Parks Department.

In 1932, New York City's Board of Aldermen passed a resolution to name this site Travis Triangle in honor of local American Civil War veteran Ira Underhill Travis, who fought under the name Ira Wilson, in the 11th New York Volunteer Infantry Regiment also known as Colonel Elmer E. Ellsworth’s Zouaves. In the incident at Marshall House Inn during the Union Army's occupation of Alexandria, Virginia, Travis's commander was killed after removing a Confederate flag. Travis kept a piece of the flag as a souvenir for his family In July 1861, Travis received a bullet wound in his shoulder in the First Battle of Manassas. The bullet remained lodged in his shoulder for the rest of his life.
