= Sons of Confederate Veterans =

American neo-Confederate organization

- Badge

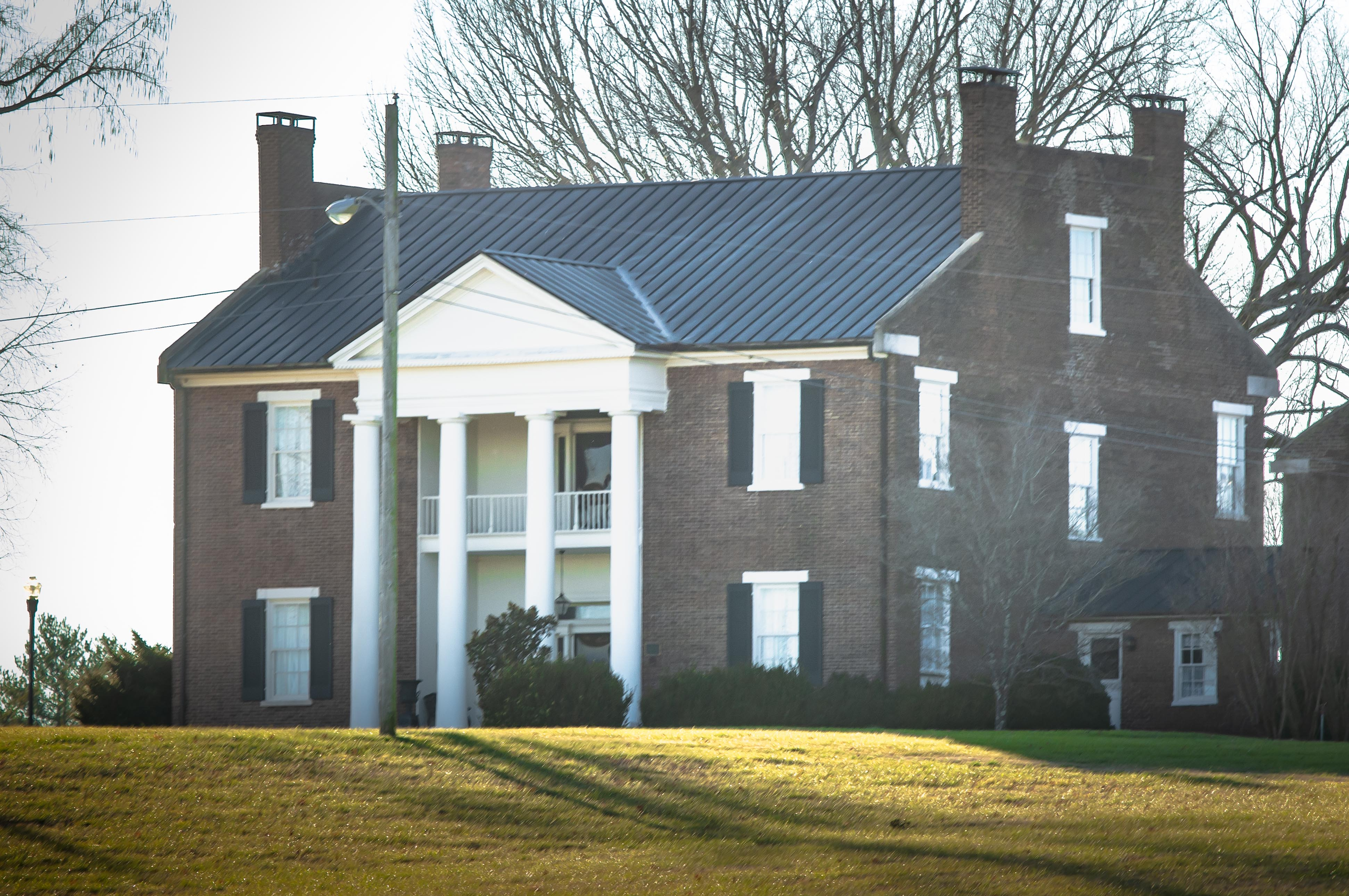
- Elm Springs, the SCV National Headquarters in Tennessee
- Abbreviation: SCV
- Established: July 1, 1896 (130 years ago)
- Founder: R. E. Lee Camp, No. 1, Confederate Veterans
- Founded at: Richmond, Virginia
- Tax ID no.: 61-1522953
- Legal status: Nonprofit corporation
- Headquarters: Elm Springs, Columbia, Tennessee, U.S.
- Coordinates: 35.584750°N 87.031250°W
- Members: c. 30,000 (2019)
- Commander-in-Chief: Tony Griffin
- Lieutenant Commander-in-Chief: Charles Lauret
- Adjutant-in-Chief: J. Michael Pullen
- Key people: Executive director Adam Southern
- Publication: Confederate Veteran
- Website: scv.org
- Formerly called: United Sons of Confederate Veterans

The Sons of Confederate Veterans (SCV) is an American neo-Confederate nonprofit organization of male descendants of Confederate soldiers that commemorates these ancestors, funds and dedicates monuments to them, and promotes the pseudohistorical Lost Cause ideology and corresponding white supremacy.

The SCV was founded on July 1, 1896, in Richmond, Virginia, by R. E. Lee Camp, No. 1 of the Confederate Veterans. Its headquarters is at Elm Springs in Columbia, Tennessee.

In recent decades, governors, legislators, courts, corporations, and anti-racism activists have emphasized the increasingly controversial public display of Confederate symbols—especially after the 2014 Ferguson unrest, the 2015 Charleston church shooting, and the 2020 murder of George Floyd. SCV has responded with its coordinated display of larger and more prominent public displays of the battle flag, some in directly defiant counter-protest.

== Purpose ==
Like the United Daughters of the Confederacy, the SCV has promoted the ideology of the Lost Cause of the Confederacy, a deliberate distortion of the history of the Civil War and Reconstruction inextricably linked to white supremacy. That ideology or mythology told the story of "faithful slaves and a virtuous South oppressed by Northern tyrants". One of its central tenets is that the Civil War was fought over states' rights and not over slavery. As of March 2026, the SCV's website says, "The preservation of liberty and freedom was the motivating factor in the South’s decision to fight the Second American Revolution."

The proclaimed purpose of the Sons of Confederate Veterans is "to encourage the preservation of history, perpetuate the hallowed memories of brave men, to assist in the observance of Confederate Memorial Day, to aid and support all members, and to perpetuate the record of the services of every Southern soldier".

== Eligibility ==
Male descendants of those who served in the Confederate armed forces, or one of the constituent states, to the end of the war, died in prison or while in actual service, were killed in battle, or were honorably retired or discharged, are eligible for membership. Membership can be obtained through either lineal or collateral family lines. Kinship to a veteran must be documented genealogically. The minimum age for full membership is 12 years, but no minimum exists for cadet membership.

== History ==
=== Early years ===
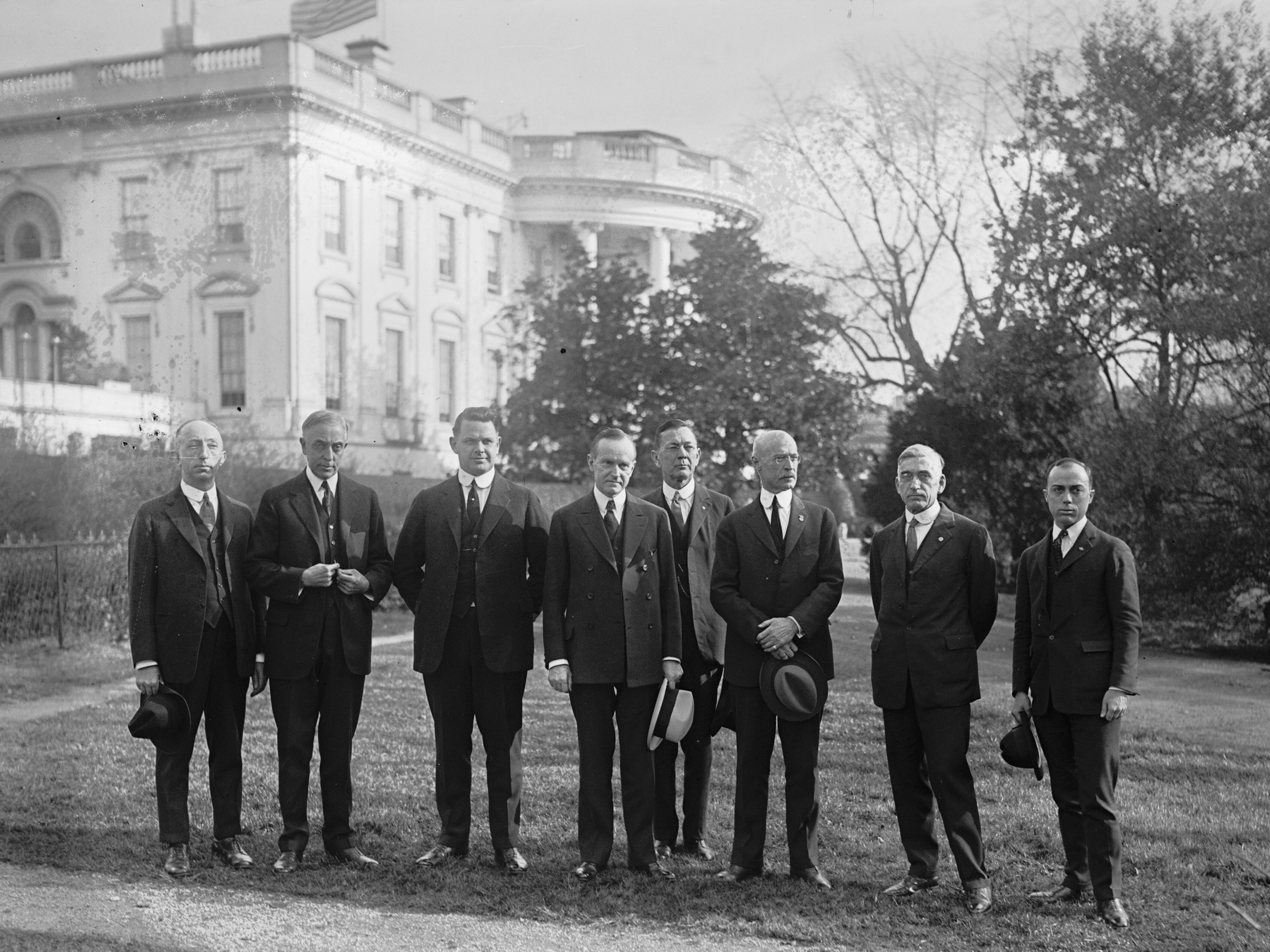
Calvin Coolidge at the White House with representatives of the Sons of Confederate Veterans in 1923.

Immediately after the defeat of the Confederacy, a Confederate memorial movement emerged. In the 1890s, this movement came to be controlled by the United Daughters of the Confederacy, the United Confederate Veterans (UCV, founded in 1889), and other, less important, organizations.

Forty delegates from 24 camps and societies from the various Southern states were called by the R. E. Lee Camp, No. 1, UCV, of Richmond, Virginia, to meet on June 30 and July 1, 1896, at the City Auditorium (present-day Virginia Commonwealth University Cary Street Gym), for the purpose of forming a "national organization, adopting a constitution similar in every respect to that governing the United Confederate Veterans, and permanently organized under the name United Sons of Confederate Veterans" (USCV).

The preamble to the USCV constitution reads in part: "To encourage the preservation of history, perpetuate the hallowed memories of brave men, to assist in the observance of Memorial Day, and to perpetuate the record of the services of every Southern soldier". Its aims, objects, and purposes are "not to create or foster, in any manner, any feeling against the North, but to hand down to posterity the story of the glory of the men who wore the gray". On July 1, the delegates elected J. E. B. Stuart, of Newport News, Virginia, son of the Confederate cavalry general, J. E. B. Stuart, Commander-in-Chief of the United Sons of Confederate Veterans.

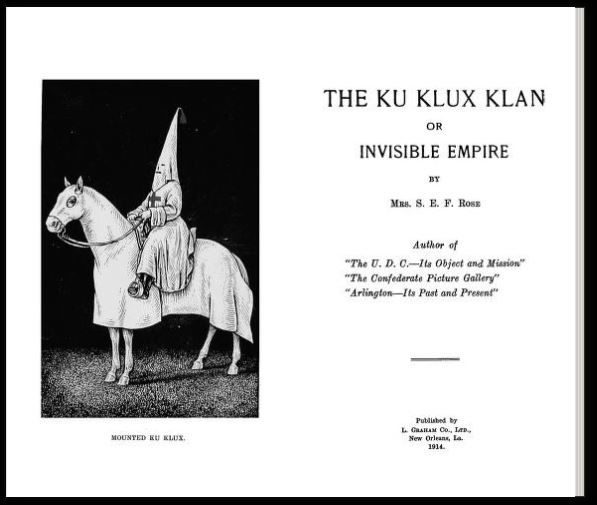
Title pages of The Ku Klux Klan or Invisible Empire (1914) by Laura Martin Rose.

Laura Martin Rose, a member of the United Daughters of the Confederacy and propagandist for the Ku Klux Klan, received an endorsement by resolution ("without a dissenting voice") of her 1914 book The Ku Klux Klan or Invisible Empire from the Sons of Confederate Veterans during the May 1914 SCV Reunion in Jacksonville, Florida, along with a SCV commitment to "have it placed into the schools throughout the South."

In 1919, the SCV joined forces with the bigger and more active United Daughters of the Confederacy and the United Confederate Veterans in the so-called Rutherford Committee aiming at controlling the history textbooks used in Southern schools. The committee was named after Mildred Lewis Rutherford, the prominent historian of the United Daughters of the Confederacy.

=== Constitutional crisis ===
In the 1990s, internal disagreements arose over the purpose of the Sons of Confederate Veterans. A traditionalist wing wanted to focus on "maintaining gravestones, erecting monuments and studying Civil War history", while a more activist wing sought to increase efforts toward "fight[ing] for the right to display Confederate symbols everywhere from schools to statehouses". These activists advocated "picketing, aggressive lobbying, issue campaigning, and lawsuits" to prevent "heritage violations", which the group defines as "any attack upon our Confederate heritage, or the flags, monuments, and symbols which represent it".

The group's more activist members gained electoral support and were increasingly elected to its leadership positions. Members of the more traditionalist camp alleged that the League of the South had influenced their organization's new direction. Indeed, one ally of the activist wing claimed that thousands of Sons of Confederate Veterans members were also League of the South members.

In 2002, members and former members of SCV formed a dissident organization, Save the Sons of Confederate Veterans. Soon "about a hundred or so individuals and groups identified themselves on the Save the Sons of Confederate Veterans web site as supporting Save the SCV", co-founder Walter Charles Hilderman said in 2004; he declined to give more current membership numbers.

But most of the dissension had ended by 2003, and most members of SCV agreed with the heritage-preservation activities espoused by the new SCV leaders, Boyd Cathey reported in the Southern Mercury. One of those new SCV leaders, South Carolina politician and investment advisor Ron Wilson, served as Commander-in-Chief from 2002 to 2004. (In 2012, Wilson would be sentenced to prison for running a Ponzi scheme as part of his investment business; among those he defrauded were members of the SCV.)

In early 2005, the SCV General Executive Council sued to expel Commander-in-Chief Dennis Sweeney from office. The court initially granted the council temporary control of the organization, but its final decision returned power to Sweeney. Thirteen of the 25 council members were expelled from the council shortly after Sweeney regained control. Nine of the council members expelled were former commanders-in-chief, a status that heretofore had come with a life membership on the council. In February, Cathey wrote in the Southern Mercury that most of the members of SCV had united against the "War on Southern Culture". By the SCV's summer 2005 convention, activists firmly controlled the council. They severed much of the longstanding relationship between SCV and the more traditionalist Military Order of the Stars and Bars (MOSB). The MOSB, founded in 1938, had been closely involved with the SCV, sharing its headquarters since 1992 and co-publishing Southern Mercury. The MOSB's Commander General, Daniel Jones, citing "the continuing political turmoil within the SCV," moved the MOSB out of the shared quarters, ended the joint magazine-publishing enterprise, and separated the two organizations' finances. In 2006, for the first time, the two organizations held separate conventions.

For years the organization has been divided between racial extremists and those interested in history and genealogy.

== Controversies ==
=== License plates ===
Georgia: In 2014, the state of Georgia approved a battle flag specialty license plate.

Louisiana: In 1999, the state Legislature of Louisiana approved a SCV specialty license plate. Through May 2022, about 475 plates had been issued.

Mississippi: In 2011, the Mississippi Division of SCV launched an unsuccessful campaign to honor Confederate Lieutenant General and KKK Grand Wizard Nathan B. Forrest with a specialty license plate.

North Carolina: On January 1, 2021, the North Carolina Division of Motor Vehicles determined that license plates that included the Confederate flag were offensive and stopped issuing them. In March 2021, the North Carolina Division of Sons of Confederate Veterans sued to restore the symbol, saying the Department of Transportation had acted in bad faith and that the action was driven by a lack of understanding of the state's history and hate for their inheritance as Southerners.

Texas: In 2013, the state of Texas denied a request for a Confederate Battle Flag specialty license plate, a decision upheld in state court. That state court decision was overturned in Federal court, and the matter was ultimately heard by the U.S. Supreme Court in Walker v. Texas Division, Sons of Confederate Veterans, which held that Texas was allowed to deny the request for a specialty license plate featuring the group's logo.

Virginia: The Virginia General Assembly approved a specialty license plate for the SCV in 1999, but lawmakers forbade the group to display the Confederate insignia. The organization sued for the right to display the Confederate battle flag on the license plate, and won a 2001 injunction from a federal judge requiring the state to include the Confederate insignia. The injunction was upheld by the 4th Circuit Court of Appeals. In 2015, after a white supremacist murdered nine African Americans at the Emanuel AME Church in Charleston, South Carolina, Virginia Governor Terry McAuliffe announced that the Commonwealth would phase out the state-sponsored specialty license plate, which was then displayed by more than 1,600 Virginians. The SCV challenged the governor's authority to recall the license plates, citing the 2001 injunction. However, in August 2015, the court dissolved the 2001 injunction, citing the U.S. Supreme Court ruling in the Texas case. Hundreds of SCV members who had the specialty plates refused to remove them from their vehicles and exchange them for new plates even after the specialty plates ceased to be valid.

=== Jefferson Davis Highway markers ===
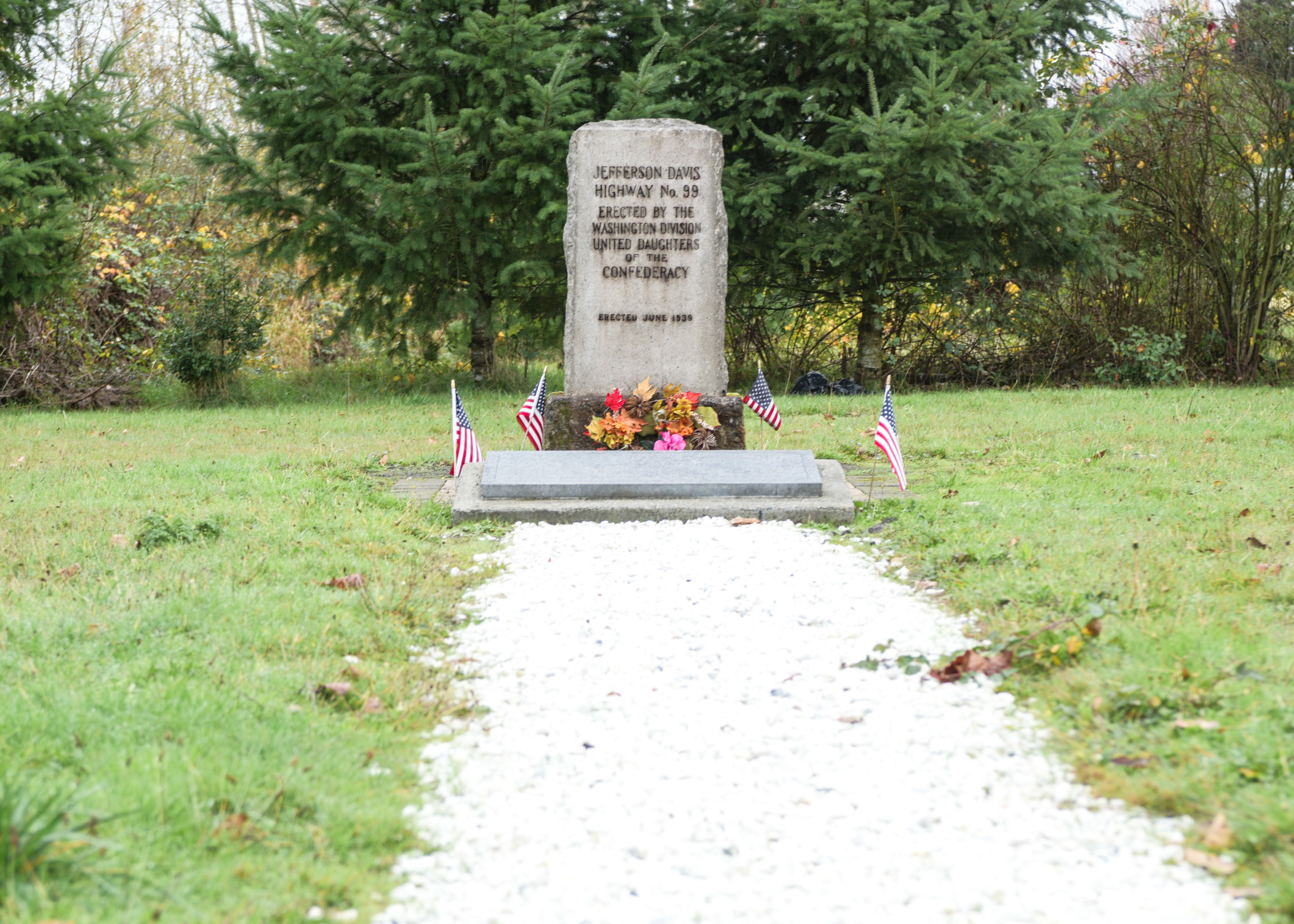
In 2007, this 1930s-era Jefferson Davis Highway marker was transferred from the city of Vancouver to the SCV.

During the late 1990s, a granite marker stone for the Jefferson Davis Highway was removed from its prominent location in the city of Vancouver in Clark County, Washington, resulting in an outcry from the local Northwest Chapter of SCV. The marker stone was eventually placed outside of the Clark County Historical Museum.

As Vancouver city officials continued to press for the removal of the stone from any public property within the city's boundaries, the chapter purchased land outside the nearby city of Ridgefield, Washington, during 2007. The chapter then placed the marker stone and a similar highway marker from the city of Blaine, Washington, on its property which faces the busy Interstate 5. The organization then surrounded the stones with large Confederate flags, thus creating a prominent display within an open space that the chapter named Jefferson Davis Park.

The chapter's actions brought public outcries, but the governments of Ridgefield and Clark County could do little, as the park is located on private property. The park's prominent location and events in other parts of the nation continue to make the park a local focus of strong emotions, which the white nationalist Unite the Right rally in August 2017 has exacerbated. The vandalism of the stones on August 17, 2017, raised concern for the park, as one marker was covered in black tar or paint and the other was covered in red. In October 2017, the city of Ridgefield formally asked the Clark County Historic Preservation Commission to remove the marker from the county's Heritage Register. The Commission approved the city's request by a 6 to 0 vote.

=== Marshall House plaque ===
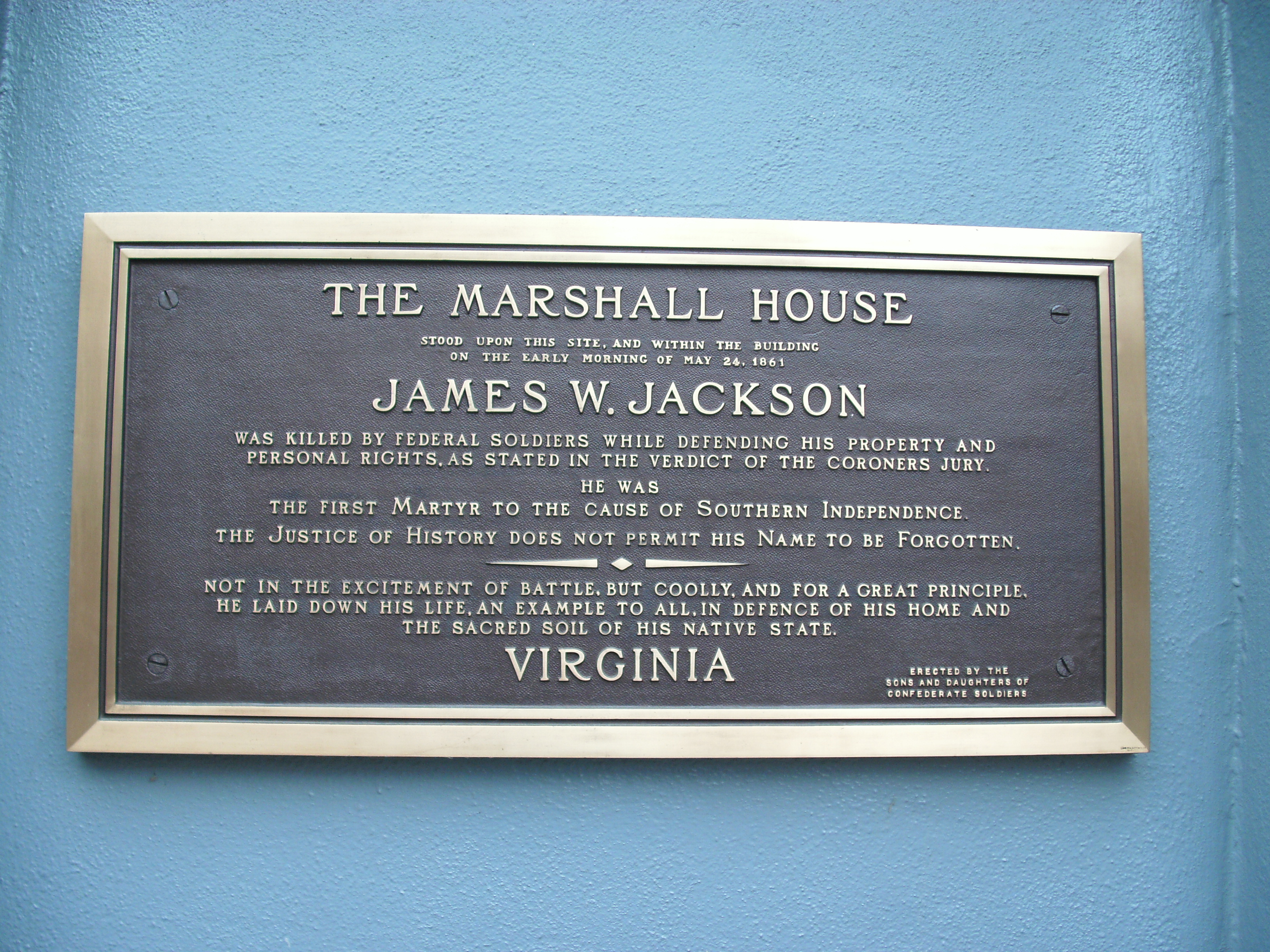
A plaque from the Marshall House hung in a blind arch near a corner of a different hotel in Alexandria, Virginia, until 2009.

In 2017, Marriott International removed a bronze plaque that had been placed years earlier by SCV within a blind arch near a corner of a prominent hotel in Alexandria, Virginia, that Marriott had recently purchased. The plaque commemorated James W. Jackson, who had flown a large Confederate flag on the roof of the Marshall House, an inn that Jackson had owned at the onset of the Civil War. The Marshall House stood at that time on the property that Marriott later acquired.

When the Union Army entered Alexandria during the morning after Virginia voters ratified secession, a Union Army colonel, Elmer E. Ellsworth, took down the flag, whereupon Jackson fatally shot Ellsworth. A Union Army soldier, who subsequently received the Medal of Honor for his action, immediately shot and bayonetted Jackson, killing him. Shortly after their mutually fatal encounter, Jackson and Ellsworth became heroes to promoters of their respective causes, who hailed them as martyrs during recruiting campaigns.

=== Confederate flag installations ===
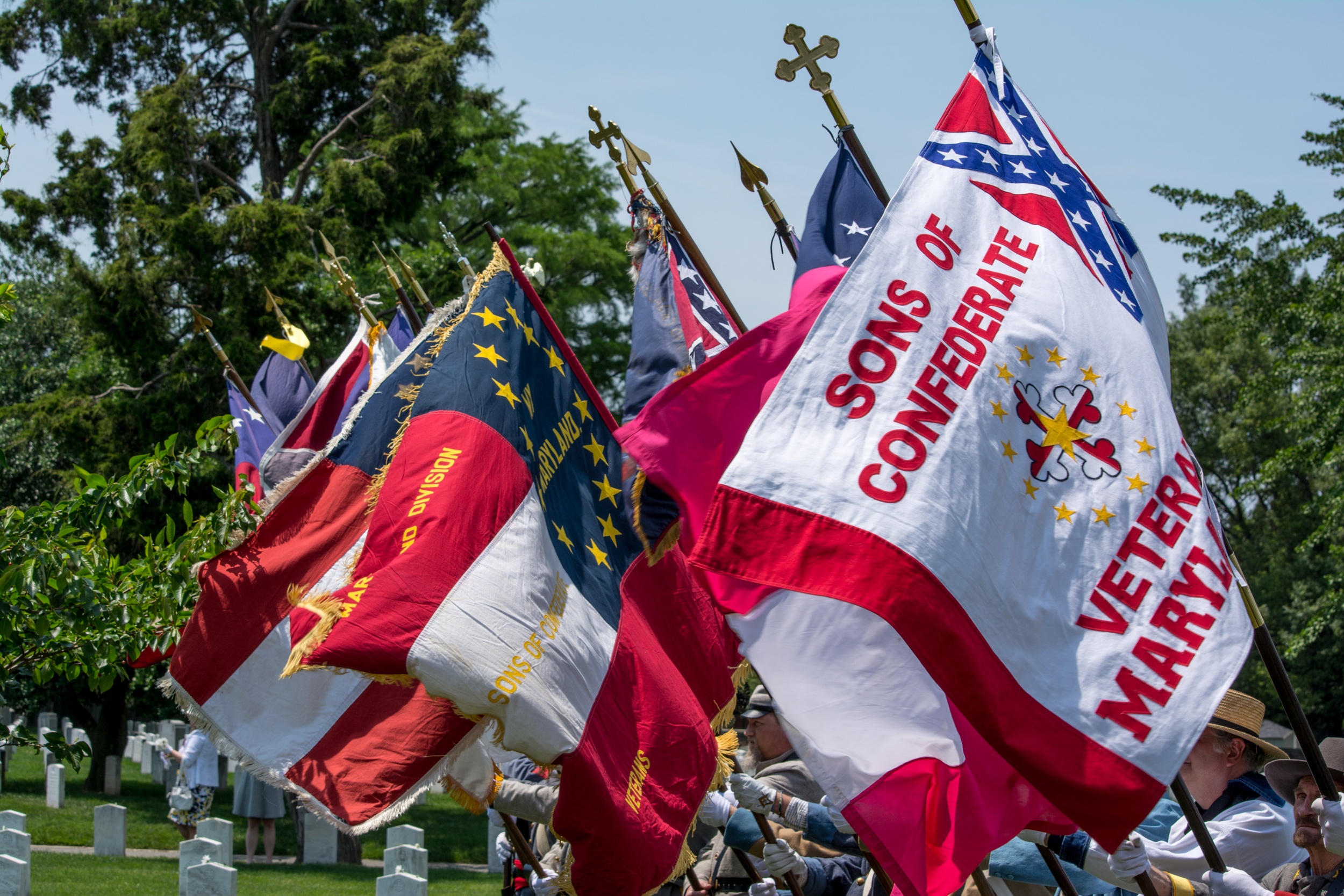
Maryland Division Color Guard at Arlington National Cemetery in 2014

The SCV took a more active approach after both the election of President Donald Trump in 2016, and moves by some municipalities to remove Confederate monuments and flags from public places because of their racist symbolism and historical connection to white-supremacy movements. SCV began installing large Confederate battle flags or "mega flags" on private property overlooking major highways, a project they called "Flags Across the Carolinas". In January 2018, the North Carolina chapter vowed to install one flag in every county. Antiracist activists, such as Roland Stanton, criticized the project. Stanton, president of the Durham branch of the North Carolina chapter of National Association for the Advancement of Colored People (NAACP), said the Confederate flag: "is a symbol of oppression, genocide and slavery". Stanton described the project as "abominable and shameful", while acknowledging that the mega flag project activities were protected by the First Amendment.

In June 2020, a plane with a Confederate flag banner reading "Defund NASCAR" was flown over Talladega Superspeedway during the 2020 GEICO 500, protesting NASCAR's recent decision to ban the display of the flag during its events. Sons of Confederate Veterans took credit for the flyover, arguing that NASCAR's actions were a "slandering of our Southern heritage", and "nothing less than trampling upon Southerners' First Amendment Right of free expression".

=== Links with extremist groups ===
In 2020, College of Charleston history professor Adam Domby was quoted in the Tampa Bay Times as saying of the Sons of the Confederacy: "It has pushed from its founding a white supremacist narrative of history that celebrates white men and distorts the truth." In 2021, he told The Guardian that "throughout its history, the SCV has been linked with white supremacist groups, and historically it has avowedly supported white supremacist groups".

Heidi Beirich writes, "The conservatism of the scv's [sic] membership helped the extremists in another way—it made the group disinclined to publicly admit to infiltration, to the point of suspending and threatening to expel some 300 members, including Hilderman, who called for an end to extremism in its ranks. The upshot of this strategy is that the scv is returning to its roots, which were firmly planted in the soils of Southern white supremacy."

Some SCV members, including several who hold high ranks in the organization, are also members of "more explicitly racist" organizations like the League of the South or took part in the 2017 "Unite the Right rally", The Guardian reported in 2021.

== Relationship with SUVCW ==
SCV has a longstanding and friendly relationship with the Sons of Union Veterans of the Civil War (SUVCW). The Commander-in-Chief of the SUVCW attended SCV annual reunions in 1995, 1996, 1997, 2005, 2017, and 2023. The SUVCW cooperates with the SCV in preserving American Civil War graves, monuments, and markers.

== Buildings and sites ==
The General Headquarters of SCV operates the National Confederate Museum at the Elm Springs house in Columbia, Tennessee. At its 2018 dedication, an SCV vice commander said the museum "will be out of the reach of the long arm of political correctness". George Washington University professor James Oliver said that the museum's "casting the Confederacy as a honorable force standing strong against Northern aggressors is a willful misreading of the historical truth that the institution of slavery was at the core of the Civil War".

The SCV also own and maintain the Nathan Bedford Forrest Boyhood Home in Chapel Hill where the future Confederate general and Ku Klux Klan Grand Wizard spent parts of his childhood.

== Notable members ==
Notable members of the organization include former President Harry S. Truman, former senators Strom Thurmond, Jesse Helms, Absalom Willis Robertson, political commentator Pat Buchanan, and actor Clint Eastwood. In the twenty-first century, the organization began admitting African-American members, including Nelson W. Winbush and Harold Kenneth Edgerton.

According to Heidi Beirich, William D. McCain is regarded within the SCV as its true founder. McCain, who remained a steadfast segregationist throughout his tenure, was Adjutant-in-Chief of the organization from 1953 to 1993. While he occupied this office he was also president of the University of Southern Mississippi and director of the Mississippi Archives. He never ceased to defend the Confederacy and its politics, and controlled the SCV "with an iron fist" until the late 1980s. He opposed the civil rights movement, claiming in a speech he gave in 1960 that "The Negroes prefer that control of the government remain in the white man's hands", and strived to prevent blacks from attending the University of Southern Mississippi.

== See also ==
- Jefferson Davis Presidential Library
- Confederate Medal of Honor
- Flaggers (Confederate flag erectors)
- List of fraternal service organizations
- List of members of the SCV
- Military Order of the Stars and Bars
