= Marshall House (Alexandria, Virginia) =

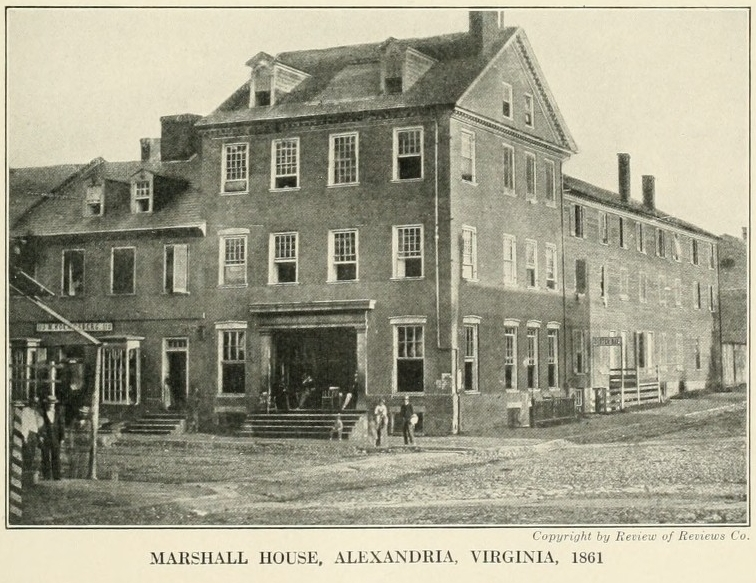
- The Marshall House Inn (photo 1861)

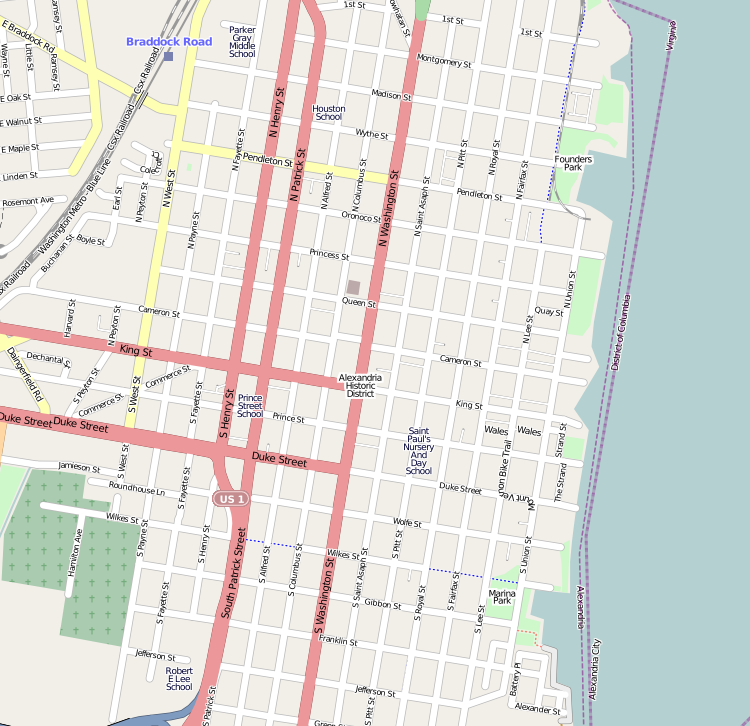
- Location within Alexandria Historical District

General information
- Type: Hotel
- Location: 480 King Street, Alexandria, Virginia, United States
- Coordinates: 38°48′16.90″N 77°2′40.45″W
- Demolished: 1950s

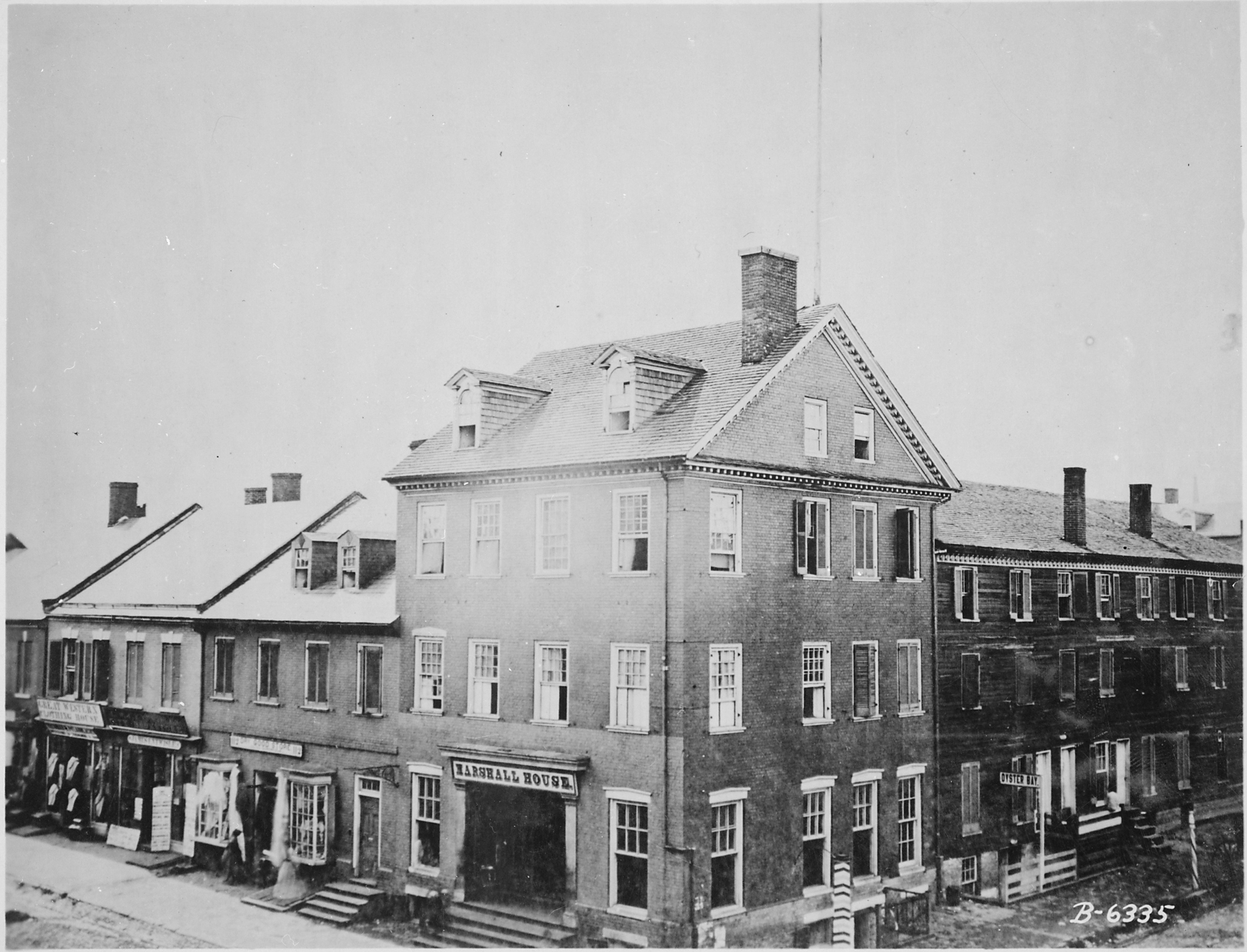
Marshall House with the flag pole visible on the roof.

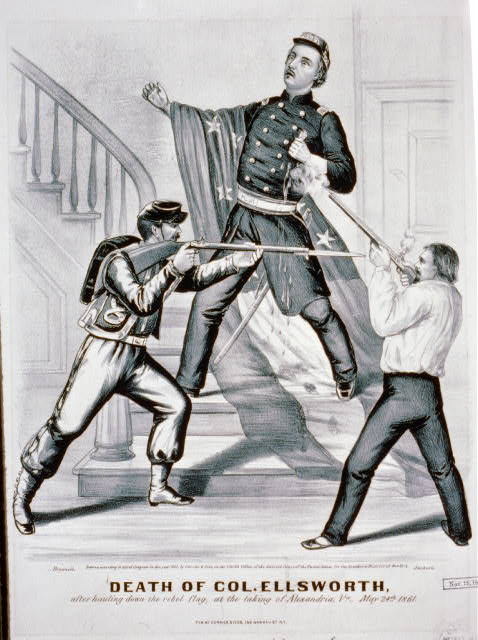
The death of Col. Ellsworth at the Marshall House, as depicted in a Currier and Ives engraving, 1861

The Marshall House was an inn that stood at 480 King Street (near the southeast corner of King Street and South Pitt Street) in Alexandria, Virginia. At the beginning of the American Civil War in 1861, the house was the site of the killing of Col. Elmer E. Ellsworth during the Union Army's takeover of Alexandria. Ellsworth was a popular and highly prominent officer and a close friend of President Abraham Lincoln.

Ellsworth was the first conspicuous Union Army casualty and the first officer killed in battle during the war. He was shot by the inn's proprietor James W. Jackson after removing a Confederate flag from the roof of the inn. Jackson was immediately killed after he killed Ellsworth. Ellsworth's death became a cause célèbre for the Union, while Jackson's death became the same for the Confederacy.

== History ==
Ellsworth, a young Illinois lawyer who was a friend of the Lincoln's and founder of the 11th New York Volunteer Infantry Regiment known as the "Fire Zouaves", was killed at the Marshall House on May 24, 1861 (the day after Virginia's secession was ratified by referendum) during the Union Army's take-over of Alexandria. During the month before the event, the inn's proprietor, James W. Jackson, had raised from the inn's roof a large Confederate flag that President Lincoln and his Cabinet had reportedly observed through field glasses from an elevated spot in Washington. Jackson had reportedly stated that the flag would only be taken down "over his dead body".

Before crossing the Potomac River to take Alexandria, soldiers serving under Ellsworth's command observed the flag from their camp through field glasses and volunteered to remove it. Having seen the flag after landing in Alexandria, Ellsworth and seven other soldiers entered the inn through an open door. Once inside, they encountered a man dressed in a shirt and trousers, of whom Ellsworth demanded what sort of a flag it was that hung upon the roof.

The man, who seemed greatly alarmed, declared he knew nothing of it, and that he was only a boarder there. Without questioning him further, Ellsworth sprang up the stairs followed by his soldiers, climbed to the roof on a ladder and cut down the flag with a soldier's knife. The soldiers turned to descend, with Private Francis E. Brownell leading the way and Ellsworth following with the flag.

As Brownell reached the first landing place, Jackson jumped from a dark passage, leveled a double-barreled gun at Ellsworth's chest and discharged one barrel directly into Ellsworth's chest, killing him instantly. Jackson then discharged the other barrel at Brownell, but missed his target. Brownell's gun simultaneously shot, hitting Jackson in the middle of his face. Before Jackson dropped, Brownell repeatedly thrust his bayonet through Jackson's body, sending Jackson's corpse down the stairs.

Ellsworth became the first Union officer to die while on duty in the Civil War. Brownell, who retained a piece of the flag, was later awarded a Medal of Honor for his actions.

Ellsworth's body was taken back across the Potomac to Washington, D.C. and was laid in state in the East Room at the White House. Immediately after the incident, thousands of Union supporters rallied around Ellsworth's cause and enlisted, and "Remember Ellsworth" became a patriotic slogan. The 44th New York Volunteer Infantry Regiment called itself the "Ellsworth Avengers" as well as "The People's Ellsworth Regiment". Confederates meanwhile hailed Jackson as a martyr to their cause.

Soldiers and souvenir hunters carried away pieces of the flag and inn as mementos, especially portions of the inn's stairway, balustrades and oilcloth floor covering. After the war ended, the Marshall House served as a location for a series of small businesses, but still attracted tourists from both the North and the South. Largely reconstructed after an 1873 fire that an arsonist caused, the building was torn down around 1950.

The City of Alexandria has erected a wayfinding sign near the southeast corner of King Street and South Pitt Street. The sign relates the history and significance of the Marshall House, together with historical photographs and other information.

== Historical marker ==
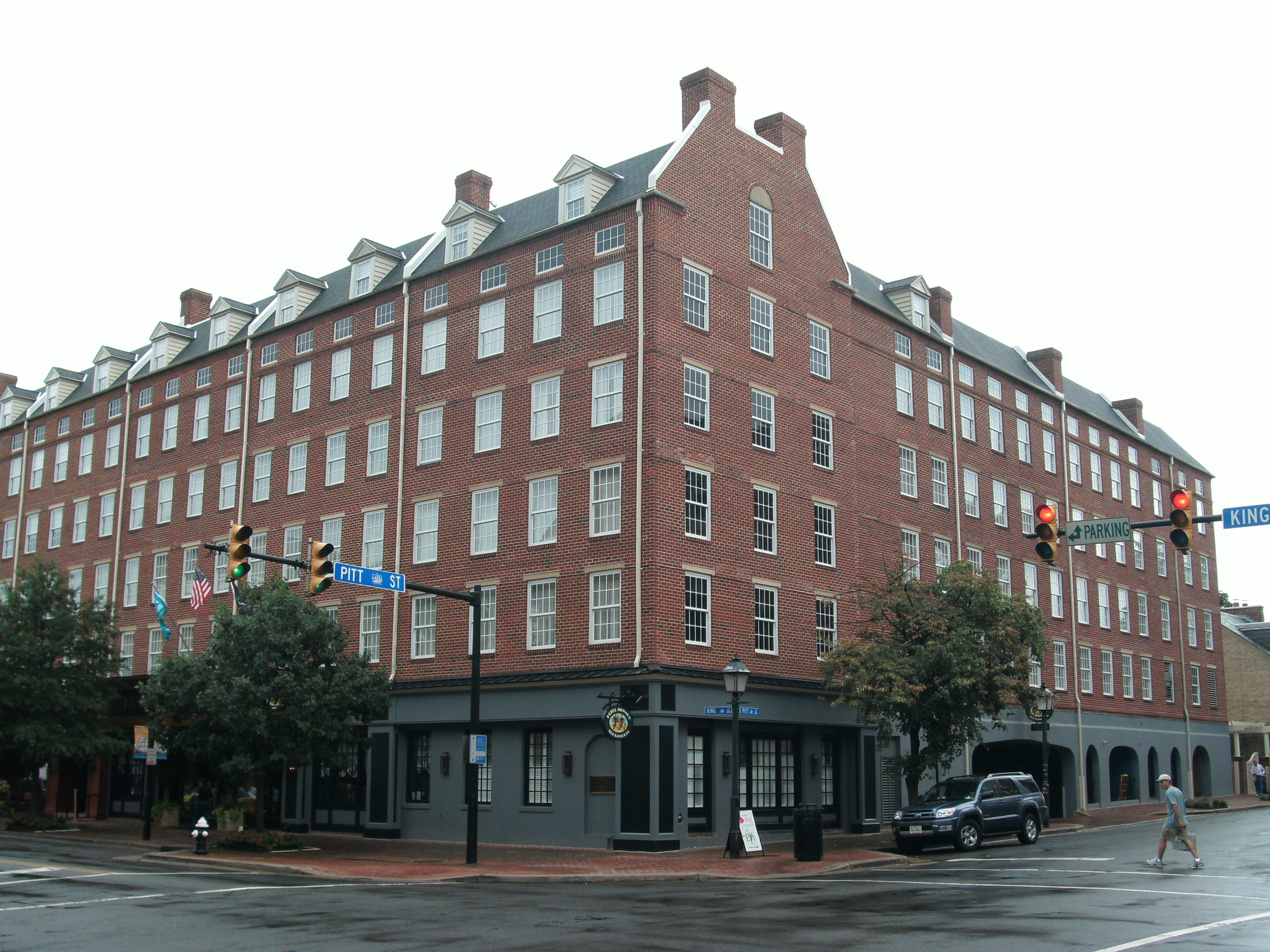
The Hotel Monaco, now The Alexandrian, on the site of the Marshall House, seen in 2009. The Marshall House plaque is visible in the foreground, in a blind arch near a corner of the hotel.

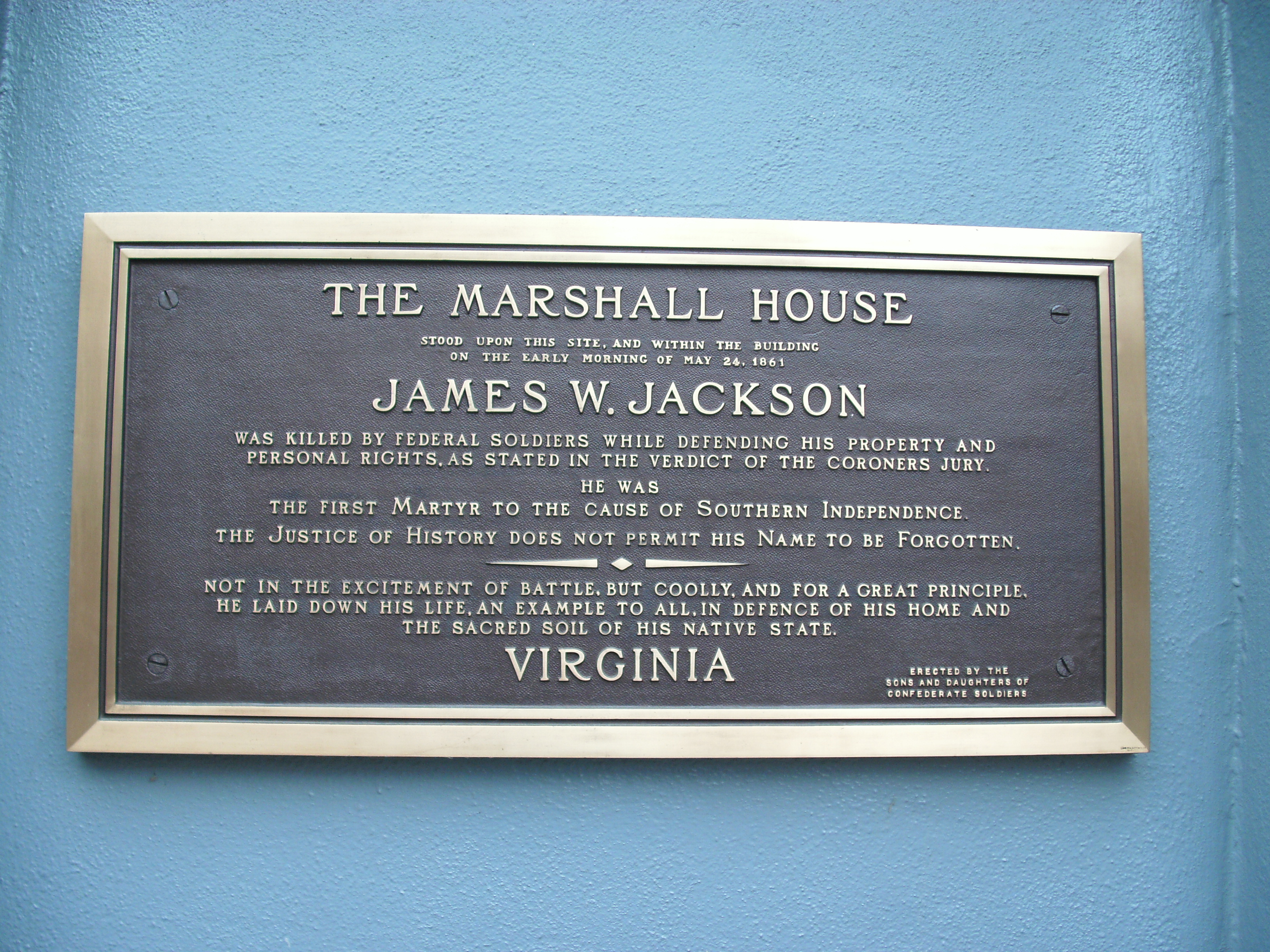
The Marshall House plaque, within a blind arch near a corner of the Hotel Monaco, before its removal. (2009)

In 1999, sociologist and historian James W. Loewen noted in his book Lies Across America that the Sons of Confederate Veterans had placed a bronze plaque on the side of a Holiday Inn that had been constructed on the former site of the Marshall House. Loewen reported that the plaque described Jackson's death but omitted any mention of Ellsworth. Adam Goodheart further discussed the incident and the plaque (which was then within a blind arch near a corner of a Hotel Monaco) in his 2011 book 1861: The Civil War Awakening.

The plaque called Jackson the "first martyr to the cause of Southern Independence" and said he "was killed by federal soldiers while defending his property and personal rights ... in defence of his home and the sacred soil of his native state". In full, it read:

THE MARSHALL HOUSE
stood upon this site, and within the building
on the early morning of May 24,
JAMES W. JACKSON
was killed by federal soldiers while defending his property and
personal rights as stated in the verdict of the coroners jury.
He was
the first martyr to the cause of Southern Independence.
The justice of history does not permit his name to be forgotten.
–––––––––––––––– O –––––––––––––––
Not in the excitement of battle, but coolly and for a great principle,
he laid down his life, an example to all, in defence of his home and
the sacred soil of his native state.
VIRGINIA

In 2013, WTOP reported that some Alexandria residents were advocating the removal of the plaque, but that city officials had no control over the matter as the plaque was on private property. However, in December 2016, Marriott International purchased The Monaco, added it to its boutique Autograph Collection and renamed it as "The Alexandrian". By October 2017, the plaque was removed from The Alexandrian and given to the local chapter of the United Daughters of the Confederacy.

== Artifacts ==
During and after the Marshall House incident, relics associated with Ellsworth's death became prized souvenirs. President Lincoln kept the captured Marshall House flag, with which his son Tad often played and waved. The New York State Military Museum and Veterans Research Center in Saratoga Springs now holds in its collections most of the flag, as well as Ellsworth's uniform. The uniform contains a hole through which a slug apparently entered.

The Smithsonian Institution's National Museum of American History in Washington, D.C. holds in its collections a fragment of the flag, a blood-stained piece of oilcloth and a scrap of red bunting that remain from the encounter at the Marshall House. Bates College's Special Collections Library in Lewiston, Maine holds another fragment of the flag.

In 1894, Brownell's widow was offering to sell small pieces of the flag for $10 and $15 each. A fragment of the flag that Brownell had given to an early mentor at the time of Ellsworth's funeral was sold during the 21st century after being retained by the mentor's family for many years.

The Fort Ward Museum and Historic site in Alexandria displays the kepi that Ellsworth wore when he was killed, patriotic envelopes bearing his image, most of a star from the flag that is still stained with Ellsworth's blood, and the "O" from the Marshall House sign that a soldier took as a souvenir.

== See also ==
- Travis Triangle
