= Elmer E. Ellsworth =

United States Army officer

Elmer Ephraim Ellsworth
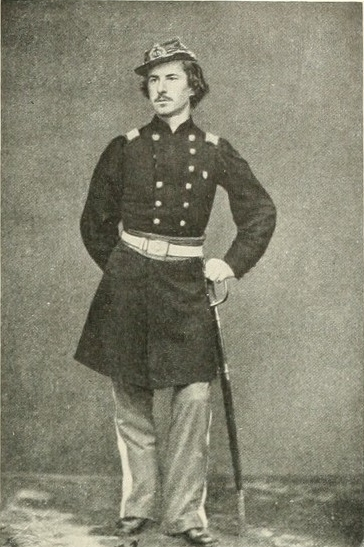
- Col. Elmer Ellsworth in 1861
- Born: April 11, 1837; Malta, New York, U.S.
- Died: May 24, 1861 (aged 24); Alexandria, Virginia, U.S.
- Cause of death: Killed by gunshot
- Burial place: Hudson View Cemetery
- Military career
- Allegiance: United States: Union
- Branch: United States Army: Union Army
- Service years: 1861
- Rank: Colonel
- Unit: 11th New York Volunteer Infantry Regiment
- Conflicts: American Civil War

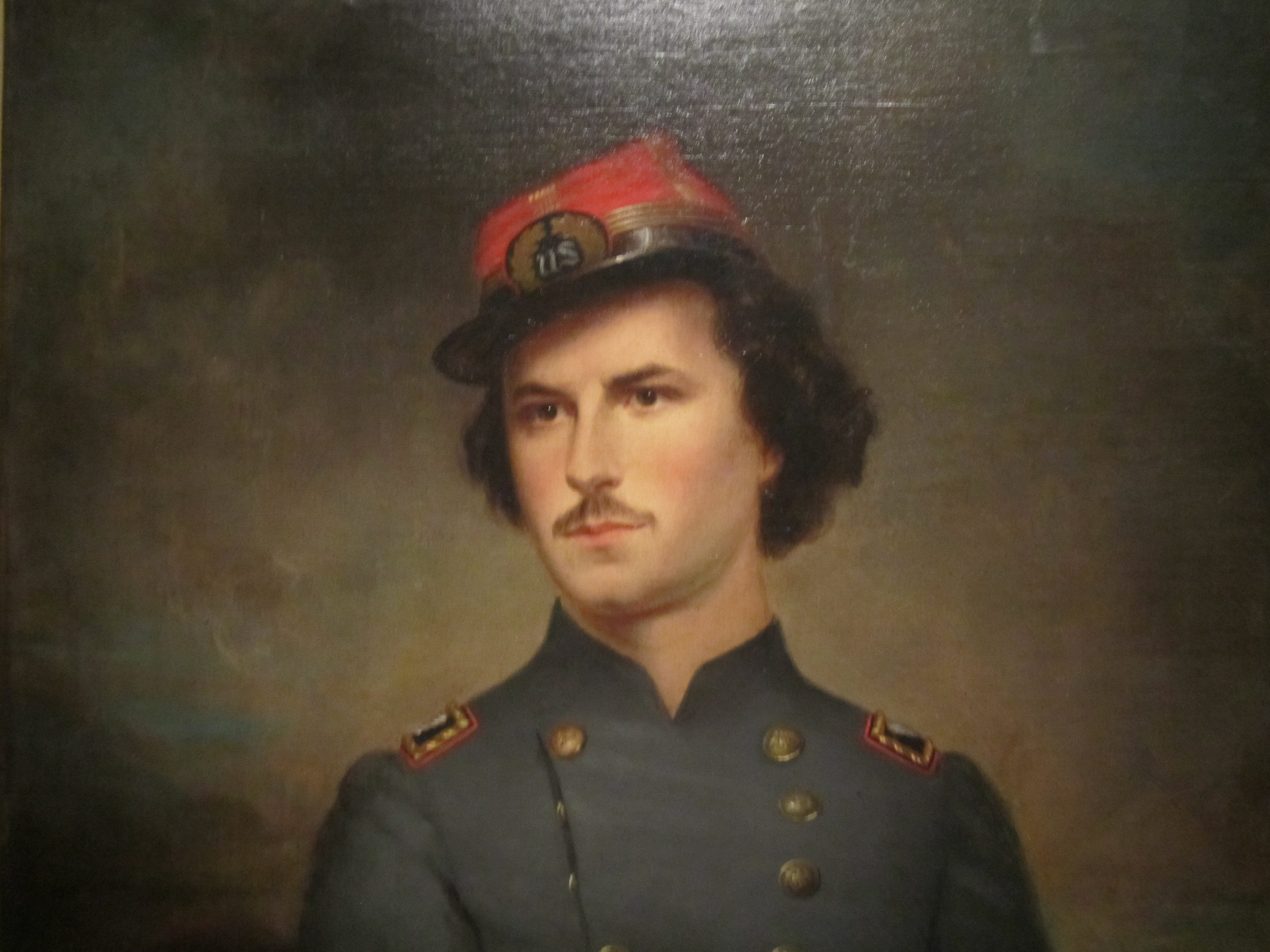
^{National Portrait Gallery, Washington, D.C.} Portrait of Elmer Ellsworth by unknown artist after Mathew Brady photograph (2011)

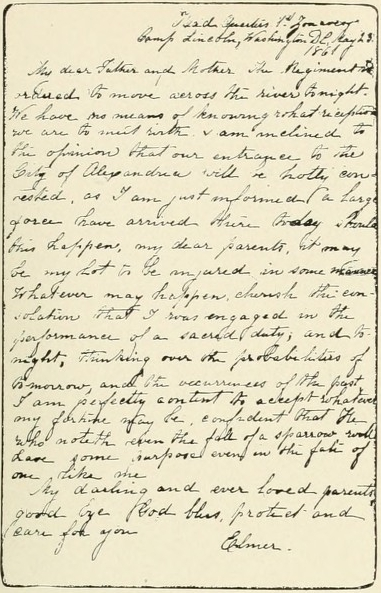
Last letter written by Elmer Ellsworth (dated May 23, 1861)

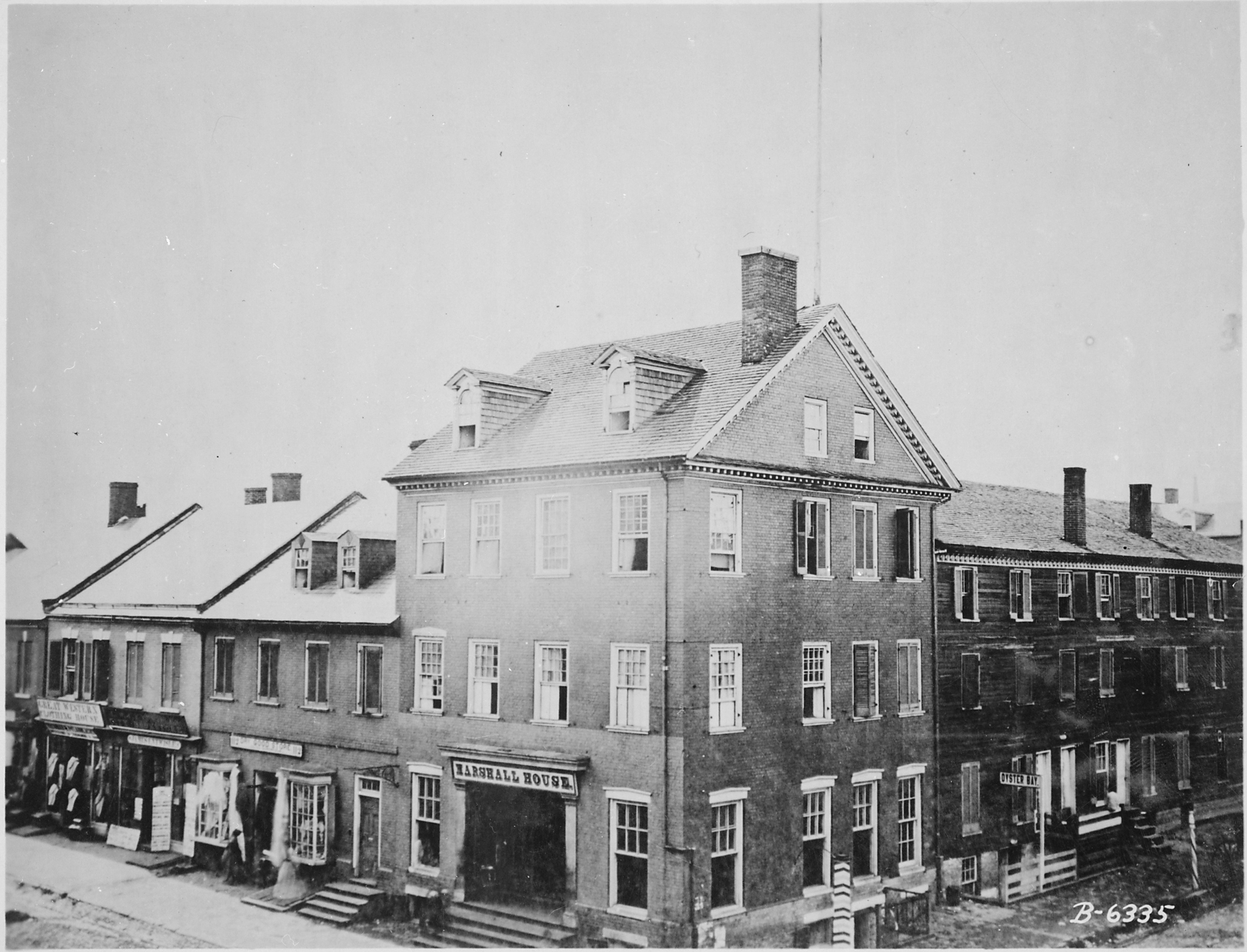
The Marshall house where Col Ellsworth was shot

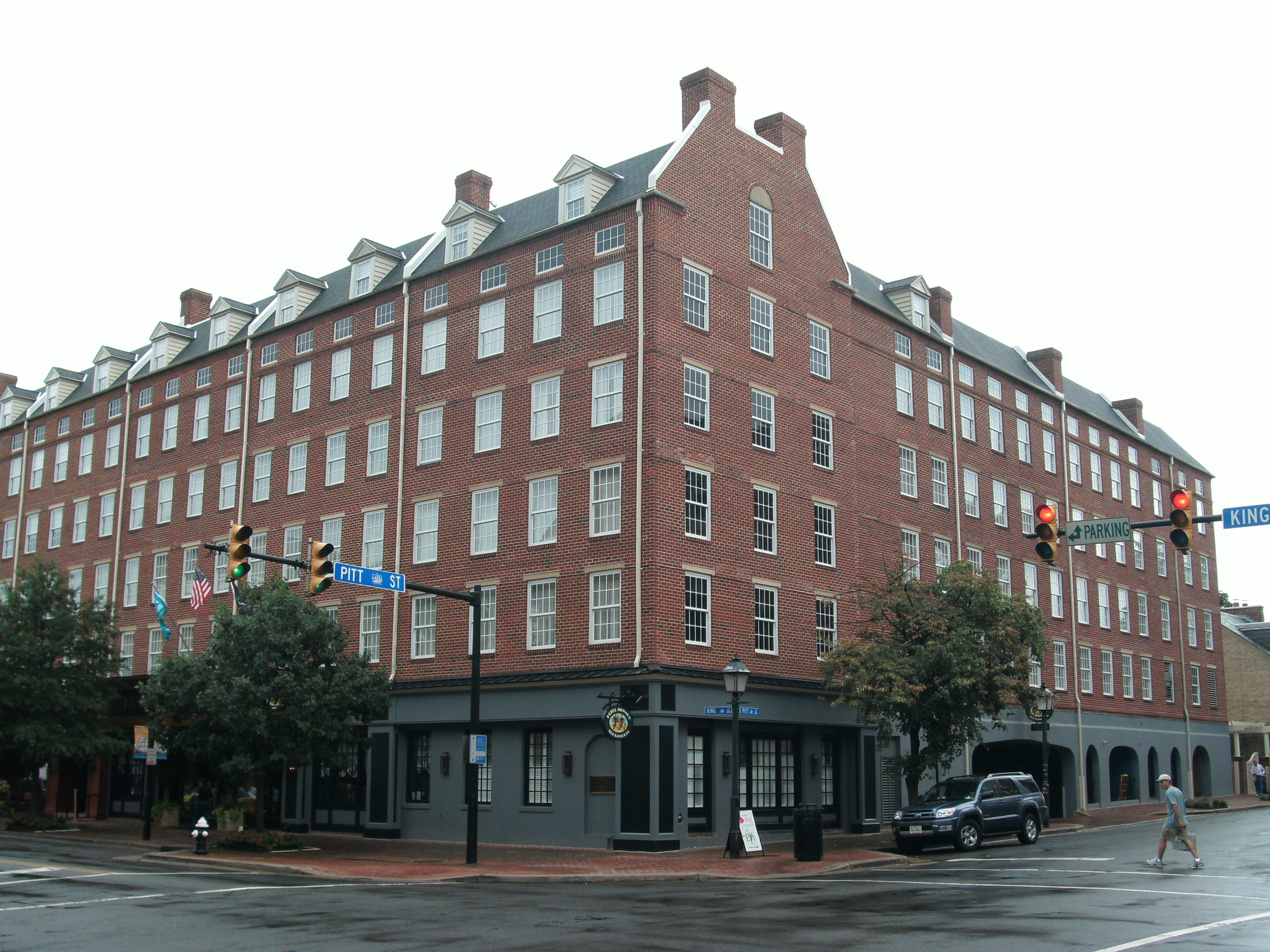
The Hotel Monaco, now The Alexandrian, on the site of the Marshall House, seen in 2009.

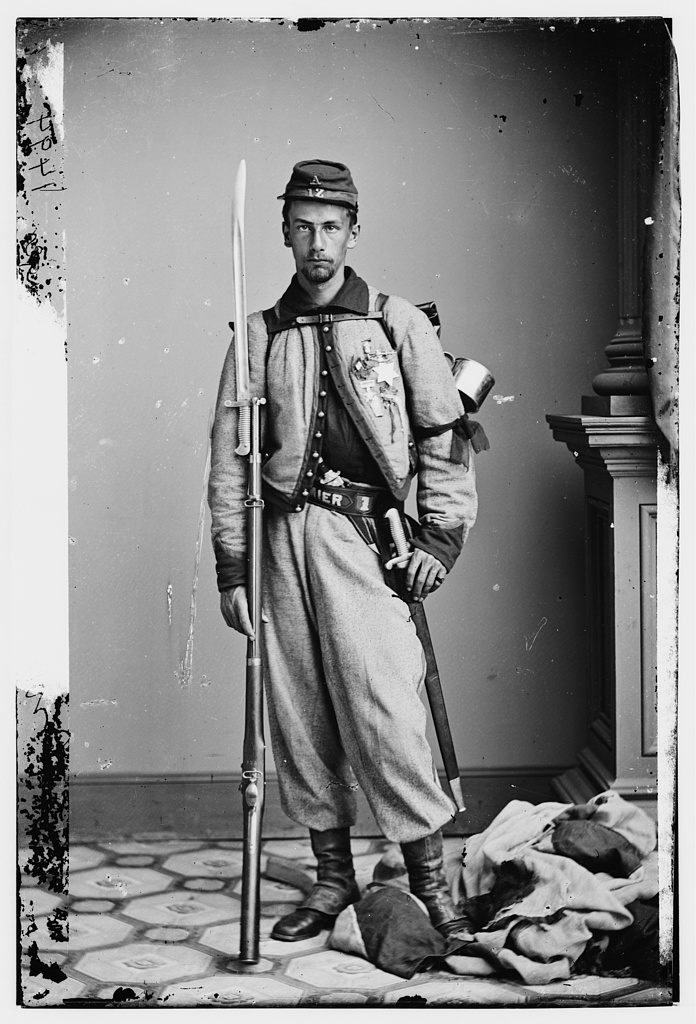
Private Francis Brownell

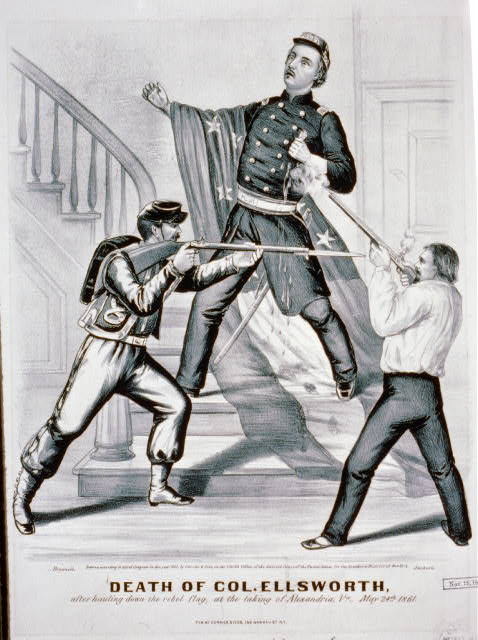
^{Library of Congress} Death of Col. Ellsworth (Currier and Ives engraving, 1861)

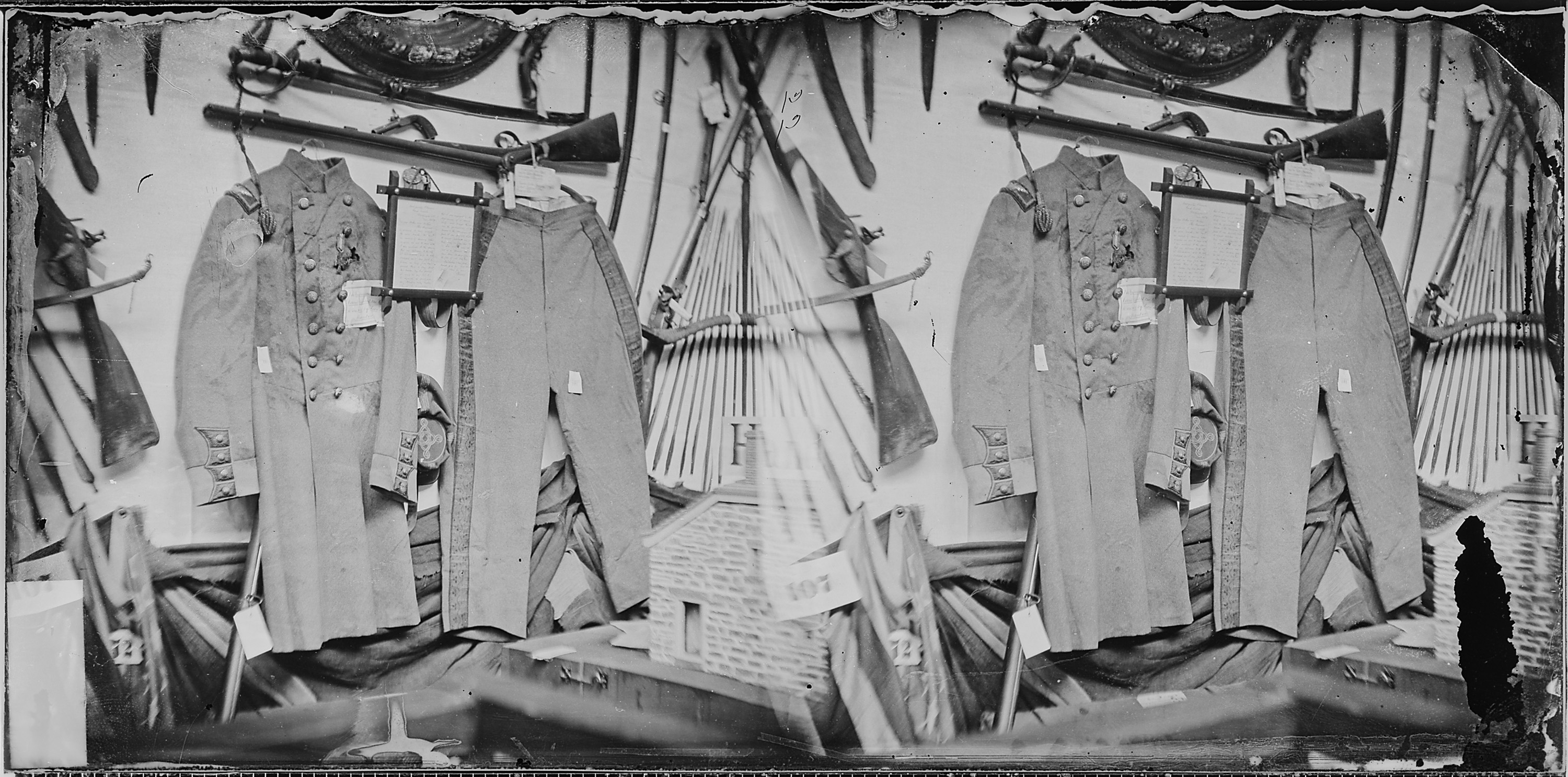
^{United States National Archives} Coat and Pants of Colonel Ellsworth (paired images)

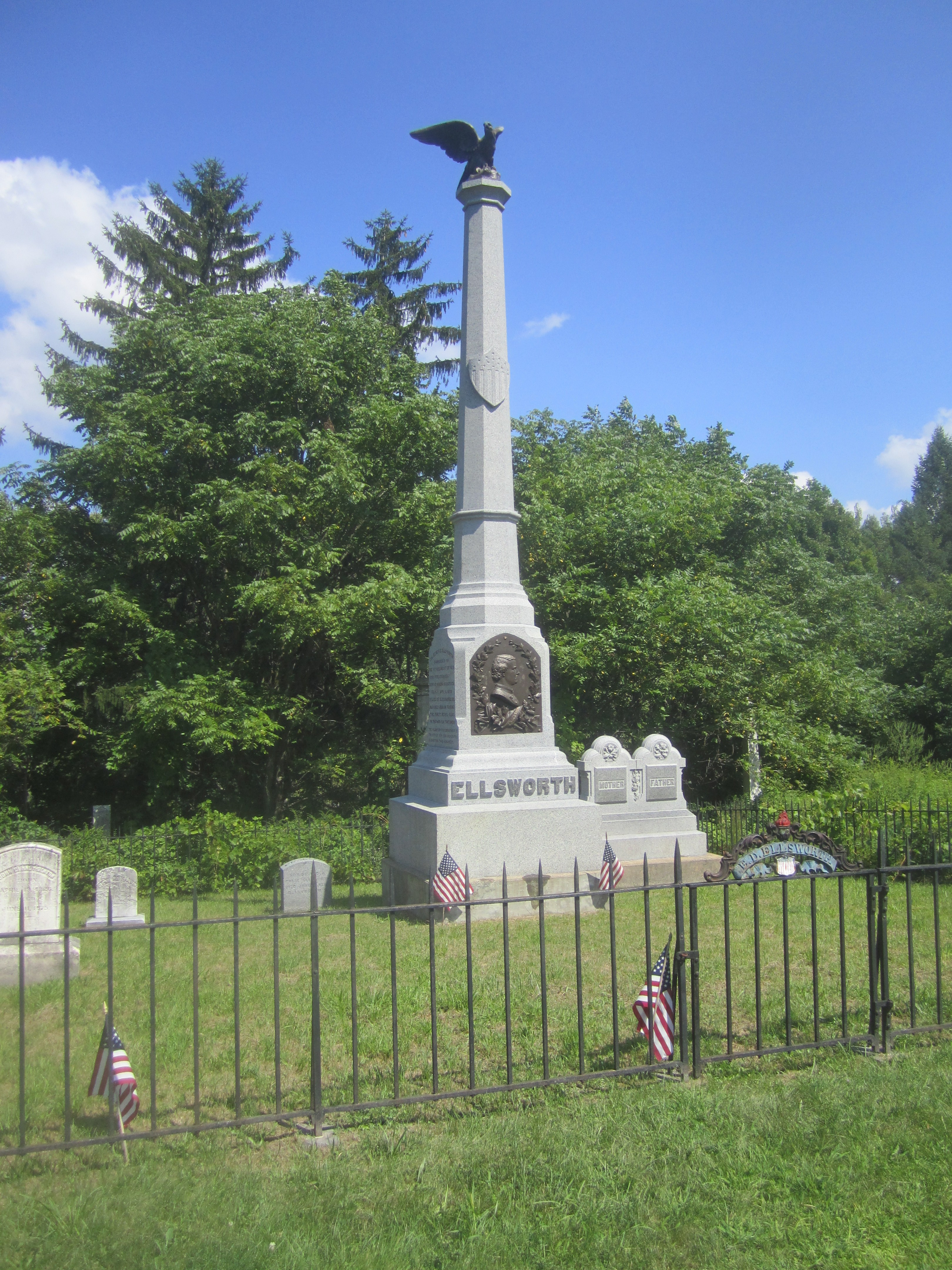
The grave of Elmer E. Ellsworth, located in Hudson View Cemetery, Mechanicville, NY

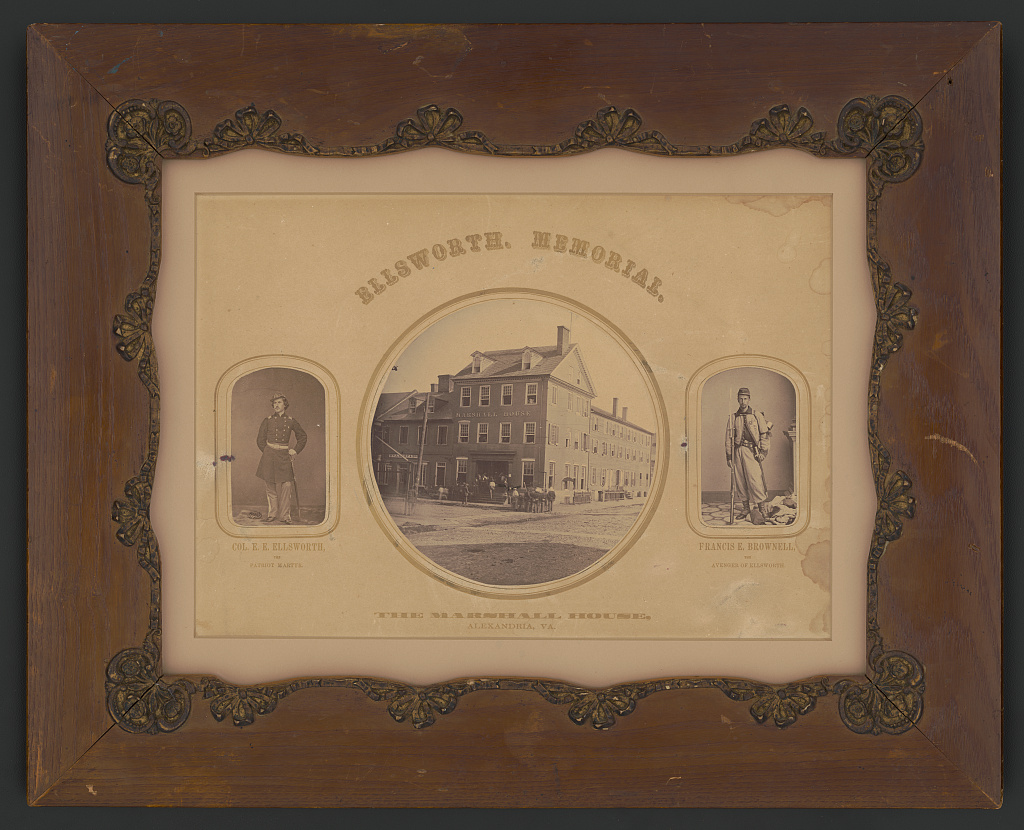
Photographs show Colonel Elmer Ellsworth of Field and Staff, 11th New York Infantry Regiment; Marshall House at the corner of King and Pitt Streets, Alexandria, Virginia, the scene of the assassination of Col. Ellsworth on May 24, 1861; and Lieutenant Francis Brownell of Co. A, 11th New York Infantry Regiment, who killed James Jackson after he murdered Col. Ellsworth. From the Liljenquist Family Collection of Civil War Photographs, Prints and Photographs Division, Library of Congress. Photographs by Mathew Brady

Elmer Ephraim Ellsworth (April 11, 1837 – May 24, 1861) was a United States Army officer, close personal friend of the 16th President of the United States Abraham Lincoln, and law clerk who was the first conspicuous casualty and the first Union officer to die in the American Civil War. He was killed while removing a Confederate flag from the roof of the Marshall House in Alexandria, Virginia. He was later buried in his hometown of Mechanicville, New York on May 27, 1861 in Hudson View Cemetery in a family plot.

Before the war, Ellsworth led a touring military drill team, the "Zouave Cadets of Chicago". He was a close personal friend of Abraham Lincoln. After his death, Lincoln ordered Ellsworth's body to lie in state in the East Room of the White House. The phrase "Remember Ellsworth" became a rallying cry and call to arms for the Union Army.

== Early life ==
Born as Ephraim Elmer Ellsworth in Malta, New York, Ellsworth grew up in Mechanicville, New York, and later moved to New York City. In 1854, he moved to Rockford, Illinois, where he worked for a patent agency. In 1859, he became engaged to Carrie Spafford, the daughter of a local industrialist and city leader. When Carrie's father demanded that he find more suitable employment, he moved to Chicago to study law and work as a law clerk.

In 1860, Ellsworth moved to Springfield, Illinois, to work with Abraham Lincoln. Studying law under Lincoln, he also helped with Lincoln's 1860 campaign for president, and accompanied the newly elected president to Washington, D.C. Ellsworth stood 5 ft 6 in (168 cm) tall; the six-foot-four Lincoln called him "the greatest little man I ever met". After the election, Mary Todd Lincoln's youngest half-sister, Catherine "Kittie" Todd (1841–1875), visited Springfield and became infatuated with Ellsworth, and they had a brief flirtation.

== Career ==
In 1857, Ellsworth became the drillmaster of the "Rockford Greys", the local militia company. He studied military science in his spare time. After some success with the Greys, he helped train militia units in Milwaukee and Madison. When he moved to Chicago, he became a Colonel of Chicago's National Guard Cadets.

Ellsworth had studied the Zouave soldiers, French colonial troops in Algeria, and was impressed by their reported fighting quality. He outfitted his men in Zouave-style uniforms and modeled their drill and training on the Zouaves. Ellsworth's unit became a nationally famous drill team.

Following the fall of Fort Sumter to Confederate Army troops in mid-April 1861 and Lincoln's subsequent call for 75,000 volunteers to defend the nation's capital, Ellsworth raised the 11th New York Volunteer Infantry Regiment (the "Fire Zouaves") from New York City's volunteer firefighting companies, and was then commissioned as the regiment's commanding officer.

== Death ==
After the fall of Fort Sumter, Confederate flags were raised at high points of Alexandria, Virginia. The Marshall House had a large Confederate flag from the inn's roof that President Lincoln and his Cabinet had reportedly observed through field glasses from an elevated spot in Washington. James W. Jackson, the inn's proprietor, had reportedly stated that the flag would only be taken down "over his dead body". Ellsworth was killed at the Marshall House on May 24, 1861. The next day, Virginia's secession was ratified by referendum during the Union Army's takeover of Alexandria.

Before crossing the Potomac River to take Alexandria, soldiers serving under Ellsworth's command observed the flag from their camp through field glasses and volunteered to remove it. Having seen the flag after landing in Alexandria, Ellsworth and seven other soldiers entered the inn through an open door. Once inside, they encountered a man dressed in a shirt and trousers, of whom Ellsworth demanded what sort of a flag it was that hung upon the roof.

The man, who seemed greatly alarmed, declared he knew nothing of it and that he was only a boarder there. Without questioning him further, Ellsworth sprang up the stairs, followed by his soldiers, climbed to the roof on a ladder, and cut down the flag with a soldier's knife. The soldiers turned to descend, with Private Francis E. Brownell leading the way and Ellsworth following with the flag.

As Brownell reached the first landing place, Jackson jumped from a dark passage, leveled a double-barreled shotgun at Ellsworth's chest, and discharged one barrel directly into Ellsworth's chest, killing him instantly. Jackson then discharged the other barrel at Brownell, but missed his target. Brownell's gun simultaneously fired, hitting Jackson in the middle of his face. Before Jackson dropped, Brownell repeatedly thrust his bayonet through Jackson's body, sending Jackson's corpse down the stairs.

Ellsworth became the first Union officer to die in the Civil War. Brownell, who retained a piece of the flag, was later awarded a Medal of Honor for his actions.

Lincoln was deeply saddened by his friend's death and ordered an honor guard to bring his friend's body to the White House, where he lay in state in the East Room. Ellsworth's body was then taken to the City Hall in New York City, where thousands of Union supporters came to see the first man to fall for the Union cause. Ellsworth was then buried in his hometown of Mechanicville, in the Hudson View Cemetery (see: Col. Elmer E. Ellsworth Monument and Grave).

Thousands of Union supporters rallied around Ellsworth's cause and enlisted. "Remember Ellsworth" became a patriotic slogan. The 44th New York Volunteer Infantry Regiment called itself the "Ellsworth Avengers" as well as "The People's Ellsworth Regiment".

Simultaneously, Jackson became a celebrated martyr for the Confederate cause. A plaque that the Sons of Confederate Veterans placed within a blind arch near a corner of a prominent hotel that stood on the former site of the Marshall House commemorated Jackson's role in the affair for many years. However Marriott International removed the plaque in 2017 shortly after it purchased the hotel (see: Marshall House historical marker).

== Legacy ==
After the Marshall House incident, soldiers and souvenir hunters carried away pieces of the flag and inn as mementos, especially portions of the inn's stairway, balustrades, and oilcloth floor covering. Relics associated with Ellsworth's death became prized souvenirs. One of the most noteworthy was the so-called "Ellsworth Pitcher," an ironstone molded ceramic vessel depicting the incident. The pitcher was designed by Charles Coxon and made by Millington, Astbury & Poulson in Trenton, New Jersey, Numerous examples were sold to northerners wishing to honor Ellsworth's memory and demonstrate their patriotism and support for the Union cause.

President Lincoln kept the captured Marshall House flag, with which his son Tad often played and waved. The flag apparently passed to Brownell, and upon his death in 1894, his widow offered to sell small pieces of the flag for $10 and $15 each. She presented one fragment to "an early mentor" of her husband's; his descendants apparently sold it more than a century later.

Today, most of the flag is held by the New York State Military Museum and Veterans Research Center in Saratoga Springs, which also has Ellsworth's uniform with an apparent bullet hole. Another fragment is held by the Smithsonian Institution's National Museum of American History, along with a blood-stained piece of oilcloth and a scrap of red bunting from the Marshall House. Yet another fragment is held by Bates College's Special Collections Library. A fragment bearing most of a star is on display at the Fort Ward Museum and Historic site in Alexandria, along with the kepi that Ellsworth wore when he was killed, patriotic envelopes bearing his image, and the "O" from the Marshall House sign that a soldier had taken as a souvenir.

Artifacts collected during the construction of the Hotel Monaco were preserved by local archeologists. They may be seen in the Torpedo Factory Art Center's third floor exhibit (the Alexandria Archaeology Museum), three blocks away on King Street.

The new county seat of Pierce County, Wisconsin, located in the undeveloped center of the county to settle the controversy between two established cities, was named Ellsworth, Wisconsin, in his honor. He is also the namesake of Ellsworth, Michigan; DC's Fort Ellsworth, and possibly Ellsworth, Iowa; Ellsworth, Kansas; and Mount Ellsworth near Green River, Utah. Ellsworth Avenue in the Bronx, New York, is named in his honor. In Pittsburgh, Pennsylvania, Ellsworth Avenue and possibly Elmer Street are named in his honor.

In 1936, the Greenwich Village Historical Society installed a flagpole honoring Ellsworth at the eastern end of Christopher Park at the intersection of Christopher Street and Waverly Place. It sits directly across Waverly Place from the historic Northern Dispensary building and across Christopher Street from the Stonewall Inn. The flagpole is within the boundary of the Stonewall National Monument, but the New York City Department of Parks and Recreation maintains responsibility for the flagpole. Since 2017, New York City has flown a Rainbow flag (LGBT) on the flagpole.

Song: "Brave Men, Behold Your Fallen Chief" on IMSLP by Joseph Philbrick Webster

He is a character in the 2012 film Saving Lincoln, in which his death is portrayed.

Ellsworth only recently (2021) became the topic of a full-length book by Meg Groeling entitled First Fallen: The Life of Colonel Elmer Ellsworth, the North’s First Civil War Hero (Savas Beatie, 2021).

On March 26, 2026, Ellsworth was featured in WRGB’s “Amazing America 250,” a local news series highlighting notable figures and events in the United States ahead of the nation’s 250th anniversary. The segment highlighted his historical importance as an early symbol of Union sacrifice during the Civil War and drew on exhibits from the New York State Military Museum in Saratoga Springs, New York.

== Family ==
Elmer Ephraim Ellsworth, born Ephraim Elmer Ellsworth, was born to Ephraim D. Ellsworth and Phebe Denton on April 11, 1837, at The Rogers Hotel in Malta, New York. Ephraim and Phebe also had another son named Charles Ellsworth, who was born 3 years after Elmer in 1840. Charles died almost a year before Elmer, on June 16, 1860, aged 18–19. Charles was buried at Hudson View Cemetery in Mechanicville, New York in the Ellsworth and Denton Family plot. Elmer's father, Ephraim D. Ellsworth, worked as a tailor and his mother, Phebe Denton, took in boarders. Elmer Ellsworth changed his name from Ephraim Elmer Ellsworth to Elmer Ephraim Ellsworth around 15 so he wouldn't be confused with his father. Elmer's grandfather, George D. Ellsworth, joined the Continental Army during the American Revolutionary War at age 15 and served as a private, looking out for Tories with his regiment. George, enlisted after General. John Burgoyne's invasion and was present at his surrender at The Battle of Saratoga. George served in the New York State Militia commanded by Capt. Joshua Taylor. The Militia served in the 12th Albany County Militia Regiment, commanded by Col. Jacobus Van Schoonhoven.

== See also ==
- List of Medal of Honor recipients
- Theodore Winthrop
