= Francis E. Brownell =

American Civil War Medal of Honor recipient

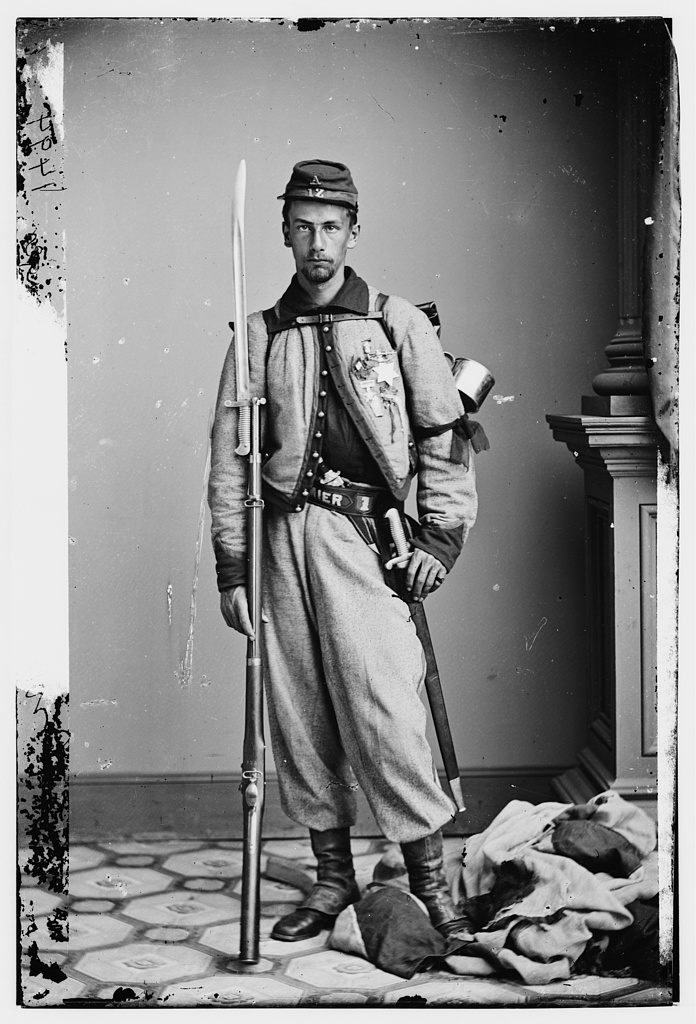
- Born: July 18, 1840; Troy, New York, US
- Died: March 15, 1894 (aged 53–54); Washington, D.C., US
- Burial place: Bellefontaine Cemetery
- Military career
- Allegiance: United States; Union
- Branch: US Army; Union Army
- Service years: April 20, 1861 – 1863
- Rank: First Lieutenant
- Unit: 11th Regiment New York Volunteer Infantry
- Conflicts: American Civil War: Battle of First Bull Run
- Awards: Medal of Honor

Francis Edwin Brownell (July 18, 1840 – March 15, 1894) was a Union Army soldier who received a Medal of Honor for his actions during the American Civil War. Brownell received the award for killing James W. Jackson after Jackson shot Col. Elmer E. Ellsworth, colonel of the 11th New York Volunteer Infantry Regiment. Although Brownell did not receive the award until 1877, twelve years after the war had ended, his actions were the earliest in the war that resulted in the receipt of the award.

== Life ==
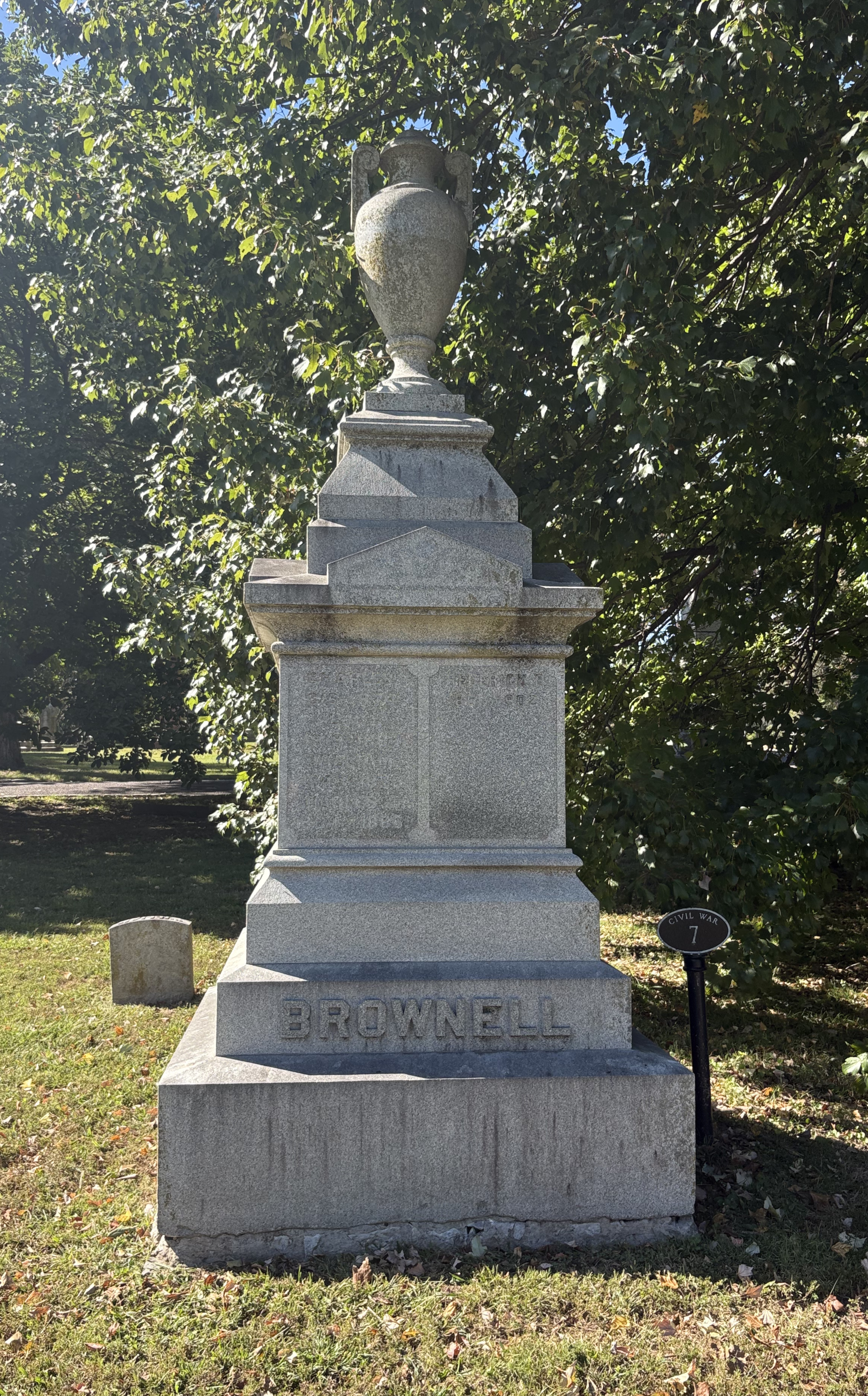
Brownell's grave at Bellefontaine Cemetery

Francis Edwin "Frank" Brownell was born in Troy, New York to Charles Brownell and Lucy Adams, where, prior to the Civil War, he worked as a clerk in the law office of attorney John A. Millard. He enlisted as a private in the 11th New York Volunteers, the "Fire Zouaves", in April 1861, and was assigned to Company A.

In the first days of the war, as the 11th entered Alexandria, Virginia on May 24, 1861, Ellsworth led Brownell and several other men into the heart of the city. On the way there, the men spotted a large Confederate flag atop the Marshall House inn. Ellsworth's group entered the inn and quickly cut down the flag but as they descended the stairs they encountered the proprietor, James Jackson. Jackson killed Ellsworth with a shotgun blast to the chest and Brownell responded by fatally shooting and bayonetting the innkeeper. For this, he was rewarded with a commission in the Regular Army. He served as an officer in the 11th Infantry Regiment (United States) for the next two years, retiring in November 1863 with the rank of first lieutenant.

After the war, Brownell requested an award of the Medal of Honor in recognition of his actions in killing Jackson but was denied. He made a second request which was also denied. A third attempt with the assistance of his congressman was granted and Brownell was awarded the Medal in 1877, inscribed with his name and regiment. A request to have his action described on the medal resulted in its being returned to the War Department and a second medal being issued. It was inscribed: "The Congress to Sergt Frank E. Brownell, 11th N.Y. Vol Inf’y for gallantry in shooting the murderer of Col. Ellsworth at Alexandria, VA, May 24, 1861."

Following the war, Brownell lived in Washington, D.C. where he worked as a clerk with the Pension Office. He was member of the Grand Army of the Republic and a companion of the Military Order of the Loyal Legion of the United States. He is buried in Bellefontaine Cemetery in St. Louis, Missouri.

A fragment of the Marshall House flag that Brownell gave to Millard while on the way to Ellsworth's funeral near Troy remained in Millard's family for many years. The fragment was sold during the 21st century.

== Medal of Honor citation ==
Rank and organization: Private, Company A, 11th New York Infantry. Place and date: Alexandria, Va., May 24, 1861. Entered service at: Troy, N.Y. Birth: New York. Date of issue: January 26, 1877.

Killed the murderer of Col. Ellsworth at the Marshall House, Alexandria, Va. First Civil War deed to merit Medal of Honor.

== See also ==
- List of Medal of Honor recipients
- List of American Civil War Medal of Honor recipients: A–F
- Septimus Winner dedicated the piano piece Ellsworth's Funeral March to Brownell.
