= Elm Springs (house) =

Historic house in Tennessee, United States

- U.S. National Register of Historic Places
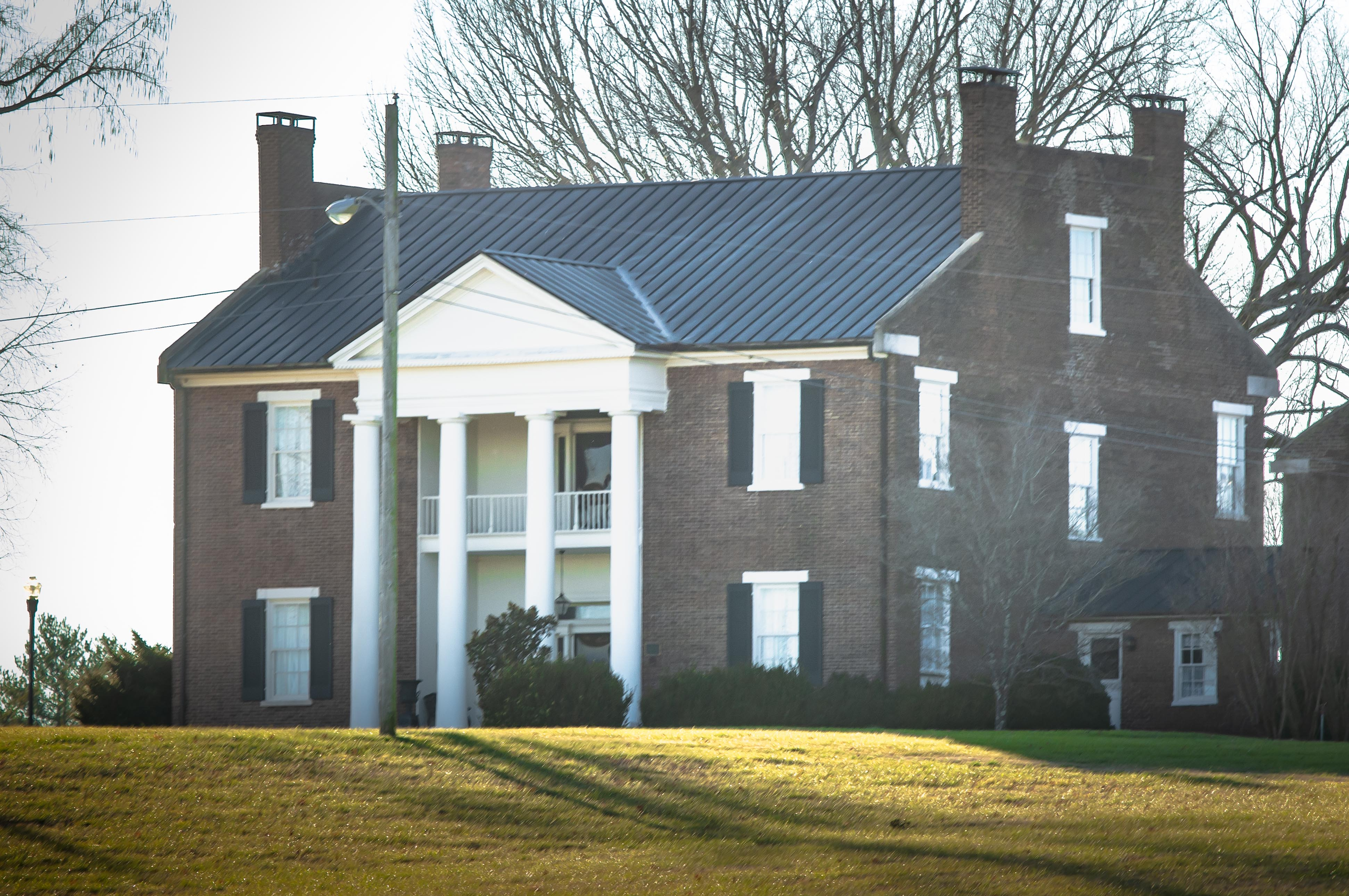
- Elm Springs

- Location within Tennessee Location within the United States
- Interactive map showing the location of Elm Springs
- Nearest city: Columbia, Tennessee
- Coordinates: 35°35′5″N 87°1′50″W
- Area: 7 acres (2.8 ha)
- Built: 1837
- Architect: Nathan Vaught
- Architectural style: Greek Revival
- NRHP reference No.: 86000402
- Added to NRHP: March 13, 1986

Elm Springs is a two-story, brick house built in 1837 in the Greek Revival style. It is located just outside Columbia, Tennessee, United States. It was added to the National Register of Historic Places in 1986 and has served as the headquarters for the Sons of Confederate Veterans since 1992.

== History ==
The house was built in 1837 by brothers James and Nathaniel Dick, wealthy New Orleans cotton merchants, as a gift for their sister, Sarah Todd. Sarah and her husband, Christopher Todd, lived in Elm Springs for the rest of their lives. After their deaths, the property went to their daughter, Susan Todd. She was the wife of Abraham M. Looney, a prominent attorney in Maury County and a Tennessee State Senator.

During the Civil War, Looney was an outspoken southerner and served in the Confederate States Army as a captain in command of Company H, 1st Tennessee Infantry which Sam Watkins of "Company Aytch" fame was a member. Looney was later promoted to lieutenant colonel. In November 1864 Confederate units of the Army of Tennessee began the march north for Nashville in the ill-fated Franklin-Nashville Campaign. The Union Army, which had occupied Maury County for several months, was preparing defensive positions ahead of the oncoming Confederate troops under General John B. Hood in a line of defense extending from the Mooresville Pike to the Mount Pleasant Pike. As Union forces under the command of General John M. Schofield began their hasty withdrawal from Columbia, they began destroying important buildings along the line of withdrawal by fire as a defensive tactic, and many of Maury County's antebellum homes were destroyed. Elm Springs anchored the eastern flank of their line and was slated for destruction as the last Union troops left Columbia. Responding to pleas from local citizens, Confederate Brigadier General Frank C. Armstrong dispatched a squad of mounted infantry to ensure the safety of Lieutenant Colonel Looney's home and property. The house likely would have burned down if it had not been for the arrival of Confederate troops who extinguished the fires they found.

The Akin family acquired the property about 1910 and in 1985 the Gillham family purchased it and restored it to near original state. On March 4, 1946, Howard Blocker and his wife, Rebecca T. Blocker purchased the estate. Blocker owned Columbia Paving and was a prominent member of the city. Howard Blocker died and Rebecca Blocker held the home until the 1970's. In 1992 it became the headquarters of the Sons of Confederate Veterans and the Military Order of the Stars and Bars. Together, the two organizations co-published a magazine, Confederate Veteran. In late 2005, the organizations separated over political differences and the Military Order of Stars and Bars moved from Elm Springs to Daphne, Alabama.
