= Blind arch =

Architectural feature

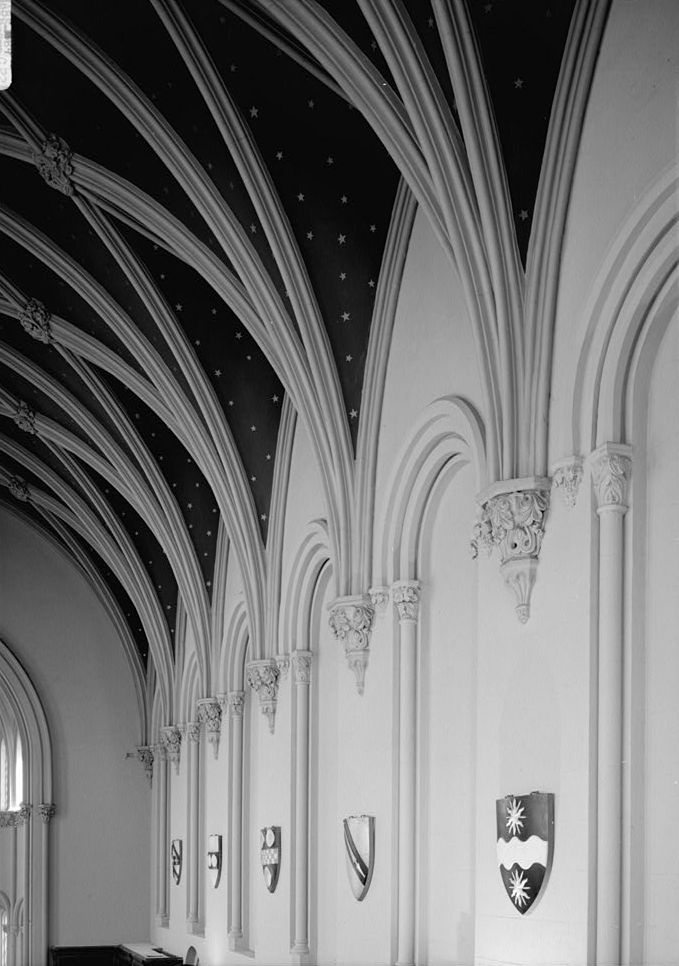
Blind arches in the form of a blind arcade at the Smithsonian Institution, Washington, D.C.

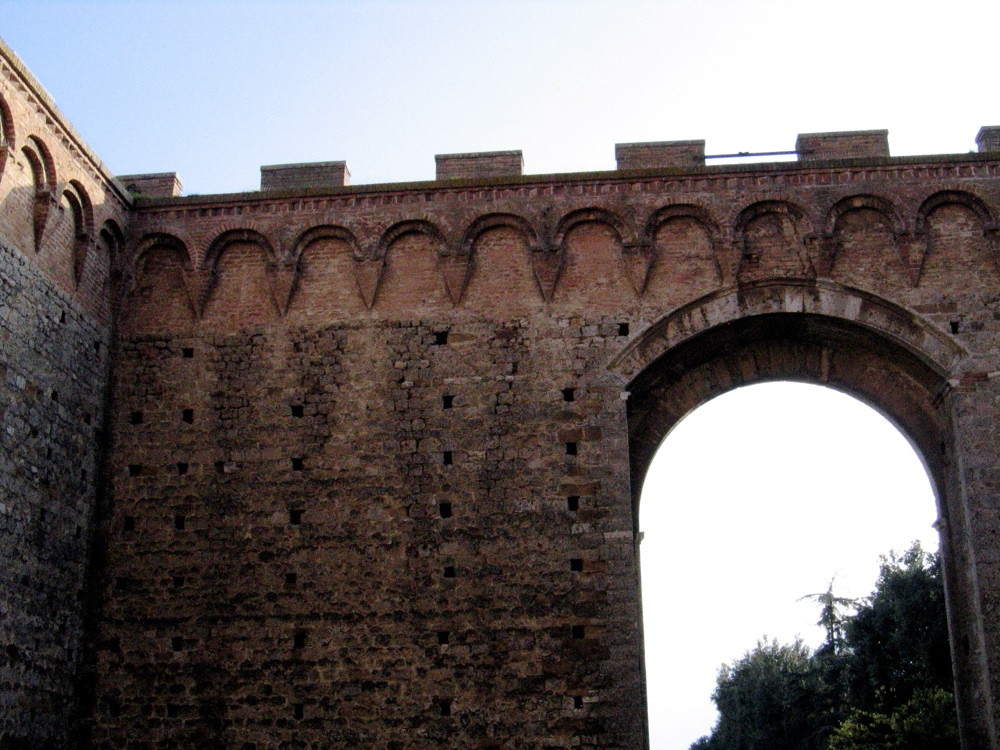
Blind arches in the form of a Lombard band on a wall in Siena (Italy).

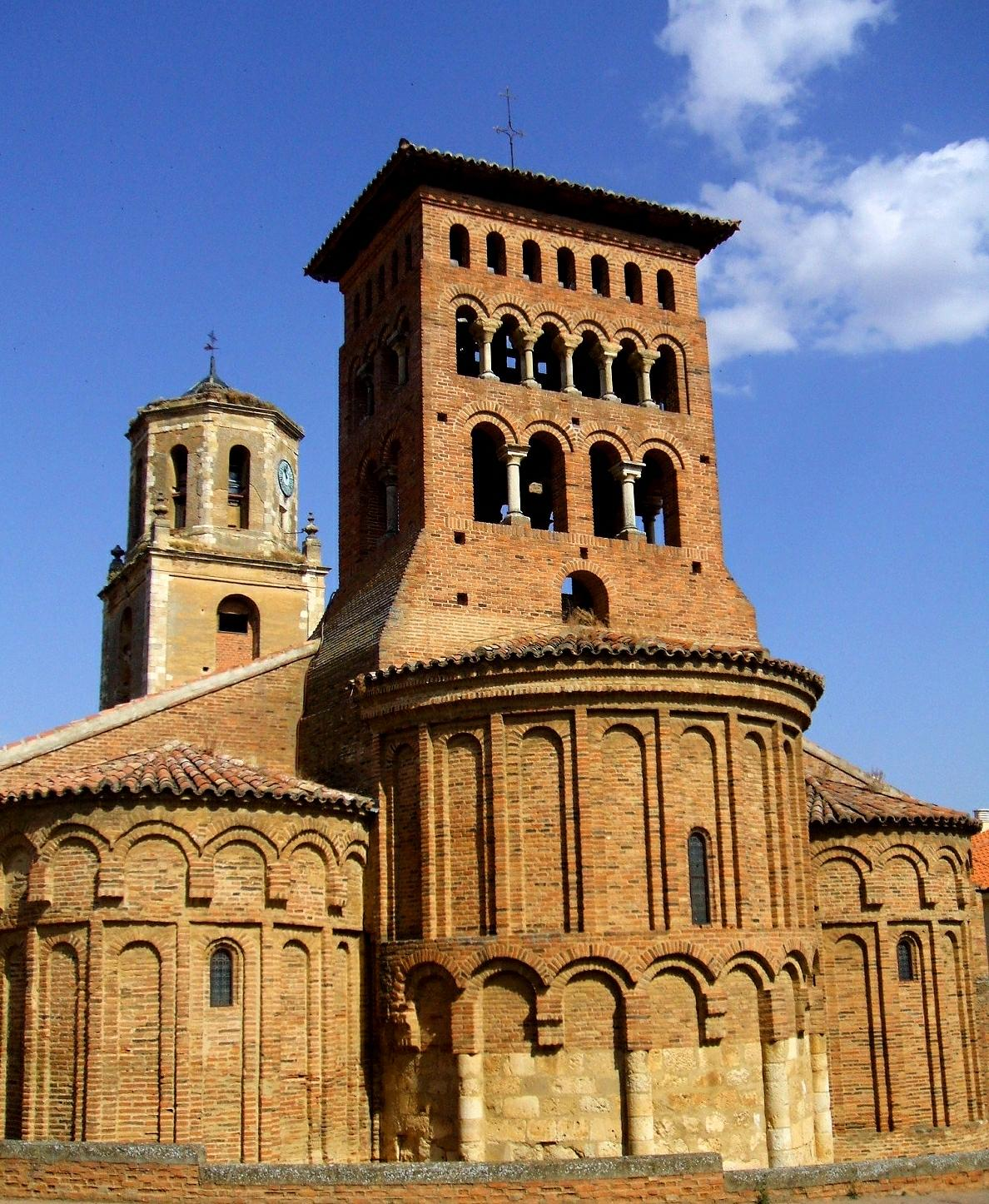
Blind arches in outer walls of the Church of San Tirso, Sahagun, Spain

A blind arch is an arch found in the wall of a building that has been infilled with solid construction and so cannot serve as a passageway, door or window. The term is most often associated with masonry wall construction, but blind arches are also found (or simulated) in other types of construction such as light frame construction. Some blind arches were originally built as open arches and infilled later. Others were originally built with solid infill as intentional stylistic elements (multiple arches form a blind arcade).

The half-circle-shaped (sometimes roughly triangular) area at the top of the blind arch is called a lunette.

== See also ==
- Lombard band
- Lesene

== Sources ==
- Hourihane, C. (2012). "Arch". The Grove Encyclopedia of Medieval Art and Architecture. Vol. 1. Oxford University Press. pp. 129–134. ISBN 978-0-19-539536-5.
