= Appomattox campaign =

Series of battles in the American Civil War ending with Confederate surrender (1865)

- Part of the eastern theater of the American Civil War
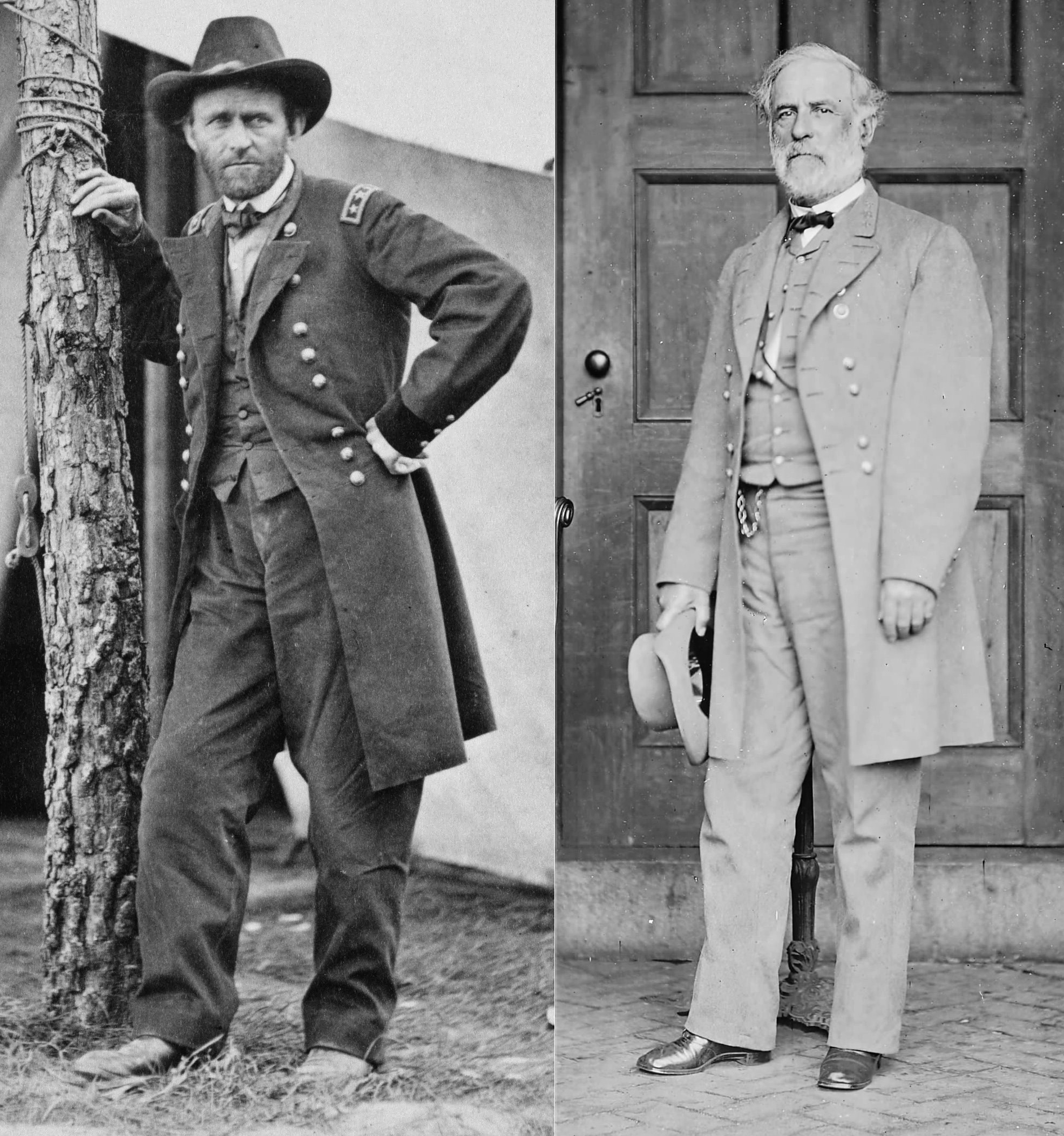
- Ulysses S. Grant and Robert E. Lee, opposing commanders in the Appomattox campaign
Date	March 29 – April 9, 1865 (1 week and 4 days)
Location	Along the evacuation routes from Richmond, Virginia, and Petersburg, Virginia, following the routes of the Richmond and Danville Railroad and the Southside Railroad west to Appomattox Court House 37°22′38″N 78°47′50″W
Result	Decisive Union victory: Surrender of the Army of Northern Virginia on April 9, 1865

Belligerents
United States	Confederate States

Commanders and leaders
Ulysses S. Grant; George G. Meade; Edward Ord; Philip Sheridan	Robert E. Lee (surrendered)

Units involved
Army of the Potomac; Army of the James; Army of the Shenandoah	Army of Northern Virginia

Strength
114,335	56,000

Casualties and losses
10,780	~25,000; Army of Northern Virginia disbanded following Gen. Lee's surrender at Appomattox Court House (April 9).

The Appomattox campaign was a series of American Civil War battles fought March 29 – April 9, 1865, in Virginia that concluded with the surrender of Confederate General Robert E. Lee's Army of Northern Virginia to forces of the Union Army (Army of the Potomac, Army of the James and Army of the Shenandoah) under the overall command of Lieutenant General Ulysses S. Grant, marking the effective end of the war.

As the Richmond–Petersburg campaign (also known as the siege of Petersburg) ended, Lee's army was outnumbered and exhausted from a winter of trench warfare over an approximately 40 mi (64 km) front, (Note: Historian Russell Weigley states that Lee was defending over 37 mi (60 km) of line after the Battle of Hatcher's Run. Lee had the interior line. Weigley, 2000, p. 432.) numerous battles, disease, hunger and desertion. Grant's well-equipped and well-fed army was growing in strength. On March 29, 1865, the Union Army began an offensive that stretched and broke the Confederate defenses southwest of Petersburg and cut their supply lines to Petersburg and the Confederate capital of Richmond, Virginia. Union victories at the Battle of Five Forks on April 1, 1865, and the Third Battle of Petersburg, often called the Breakthrough at Petersburg, on April 2, 1865, opened Petersburg and Richmond to imminent capture. Lee ordered the evacuation of Confederate forces from both Petersburg and Richmond on the night of April 2–3 before Grant's army could cut off any escape. Confederate government leaders also fled west from Richmond that night.

The Confederates marched west, heading toward Lynchburg, Virginia, as an alternative capital. Lee planned to resupply his army at one of those cities and march southwest into North Carolina where he could unite his army with the Confederate army commanded by General Joseph E. Johnston. Grant's Union Army pursued Lee's fleeing Confederates relentlessly. During the next week, the Union troops fought a series of battles with Confederate units, cut off or destroyed Confederate supplies and blocked their paths to the south and ultimately to the west. On April 6, 1865, the Confederate Army suffered a significant defeat at the Battle of Sailor's Creek, Virginia, where they lost about 7,700 men killed or captured and an unknown number wounded. Nonetheless, Lee continued to move the remainder of his battered army to the west. Soon cornered, short of food and supplies and outnumbered, Lee surrendered the Army of Northern Virginia to Grant on April 9, 1865, at the McLean House near the county courthouse in the small central Virginia village of Appomattox Court House.

== Background ==
=== Military situation ===
After the Overland Campaign, on June 15–18, 1864, two Union Army corps failed to seize Petersburg from a small force of Confederate defenders at the Second Battle of Petersburg, also known as Grant's first offensive at Petersburg. (Note: Some historians suggest that the First Battle of Petersburg should be considered the first offensive.) By June 18, the Army of Northern Virginia reinforced the Confederate defenders, ending the possibility of a quick Union victory. At the start of the campaign, the Union forces could pin down most of the Army of Northern Virginia to their trenches and fortifications running from northeast of Richmond to southwest of Petersburg but was not strong or large enough to surround the Confederate Army or to cut all supply routes to Petersburg and Richmond or to turn the Confederate Army out of its defenses. (Note: The Richmond–Petersburg campaign was not a "siege" as usually defined because the Confederate Army was never surrounded.) The smaller Confederate Army was strong enough to maintain their defenses and to detach some units for independent operations but not large enough to send a field army out to fight a major battle with the Union force that might compel a retreat.

=== Grant's strategy ===
Grant's strategy was to destroy or cut off sources of supply and sever supply lines to Petersburg and Richmond, which also would result in extending to the breaking point the defensive lines of the outnumbered and declining Confederate force. In pursuit of these objectives, Grant launched five more offensives at Petersburg during the remaining months of 1864, another in February 1865, and two more at the end of March and beginning of April 1865. (Note: Historian Earl J. Hess considers the Union Army offensive at the end of March and beginning of April 1865, which brought success with the crushing of the extended Confederate right flank at the Battle of Five Forks on April 1, 1865, as the eighth offensive. Hess, 2009, pp. 260–263. Hess characterizes the Third Battle of Petersburg or Breakthrough at Petersburg on April 2, 1865, as Grant's ninth offensive. Hess, 2009, p. 264.) During the fall of 1864 and the winter of 1864–1865, Grant slowly extended the Union Army line south of Petersburg westward. Lee extended the Confederate line to match the Union moves, but the defenders were stretched increasingly thin.

=== Battle of Hatcher's Run ===
On February 5, 1865, Grant sent a large force of cavalry and the V Corps of infantry toward Dinwiddie Court House and Stony Creek Station to interrupt the Confederate's Boydton Plank Road supply route and capture large numbers of wagons with supplies reported to be en route. The raid on the supply route and supplies accomplished little as only 18 wagons were found on the road. A significant result of the offensive was the extension of the Union line 4 miles (6.4 km) to the west from Fort Sampson to the Vaughan Road crossing of Hatcher's Run and captured two key road crossings of Hatcher's Run near Armstrong's Mill. The action of the II Corps, which was promptly joined by the V Corps, in moving to protect the attacking force and to defend their advanced positions, resulted in the extension of the lines. Fighting continued in bad weather on February 6 and 7 after which the Union force built trenches and fortifications to hold the extended line. The Confederates matched the Union works by extending their Boydton Plank Road Line to the south and their White Oak Road line to the west. With the additions, the lines of the armies south of Petersburg extended 15 miles (24 km) from the Appomattox River to Hatcher's Run.

=== Lee plans to withdraw from Petersburg ===
After the Battle of Hatcher's Run, Lee knew his army lacked the number of men needed to continue extension of his line and he realized Grant would continue to press them to do just that. (Note: Lee had to use two of his three reserve units to hold the extended line. Bearss, 2014, p. 239.) (Note: Shelby Foote states that the Confederate line was extended 3 miles (4.8 km) to 37 miles (60 km), "exclusive of recurrent jogs and doublings", and that his strength was reduced to 46,398 men "present for duty." Foote, 1974, p. 785.) On February 22, 1865, Lee advised Confederate States Secretary of War John C. Breckinridge that he expected Grant to "draw out his left, with the intent of enveloping me." He told Breckinridge and Lieutenant General James Longstreet that supplies should be collected at Burkeville, Virginia, in preparation for the army to move west. Lee wanted to move when local roads became passable as spring rains decreased and before Union reinforcements from Sheridan's cavalry from the Shenandoah Valley, recent new recruits for Grant's force, and possibly even men from Major General William T. Sherman's armies already operating in North Carolina, could arrive at Petersburg.

In early March, 1865, Lee decided that his army must break out of the Richmond and Petersburg lines, obtain food and supplies at Danville, Virginia, or Lynchburg, Virginia, and join General Joseph E. Johnston's force opposing Major General Sherman's Union army.

After discussing the situation with Major General John B. Gordon on March 4, 1865, Lee approved Gordon's proposal to attempt to capture or break a portion of the Union lines. The expected result of a successful attack would be to threaten or damage Grant's base and supply lines, compel Grant to shorten his line from the western end and to delay his pursuit of any Confederate force's withdrawal. Then, Lee could shorten his line and send part of his army to help Johnston in North Carolina. In the alternative, Lee could move his entire army to help take on Sherman first and, if successful, turn the combined Confederate force back against Grant. (Note: Lee met with Confederate President Jefferson Davis on March 4, 1865, to urge him to negotiate peace with the Union government. Davis declined, noting the failure of a recent peace effort at the Hampton Roads Conference. He also did not want to abandon Richmond. This meeting confirmed to Lee that the Confederate Army must fight. Wyrick, 2014, p. 245.) On March 22, 1865, Gordon told Lee he had determined that the best place to attack would be at Fort Stedman, east of Petersburg and south of the Appomattox River where the armies' lines were only about 200 yards apart. Lee approved the planned attack.

=== March 24, 1865: Grant's orders ===
On March 24, 1865, Grant issued orders for an offensive to begin on March 29, 1865. Grant planned for Major General Philip H. Sheridan's cavalry to cut the remaining open Confederate railroads, the Southside Railroad to Petersburg and the Richmond and Danville Railroad to Richmond, and for two infantry corps to protect Sheridan's move and to turn the Confederates out of the western end of their line. Grant's top priority was to force an engagement in order to defeat the Confederate army with the railroad raid as a secondary objective. Grant also intended that his forces block a Confederate retreat to the west. Grant ordered the Army of the Potomac's V Corps under Major General Gouverneur K. Warren and II Corps under Major General Andrew A. Humphreys to support Sheridan, mainly by outflanking the Confederates to prevent them from interfering with Sheridan's mission. Grant also initially ordered Warren's corps to seize Dinwiddie Court House, where they also could capture a segment of the Boydton Plank Road, a task later given to Sheridan. Grant ordered Major General Edward Ord, to quietly move units from the Army of the James to fill in the portion of the Petersburg line that the II Corps then occupied.

=== Battle of Fort Stedman ===
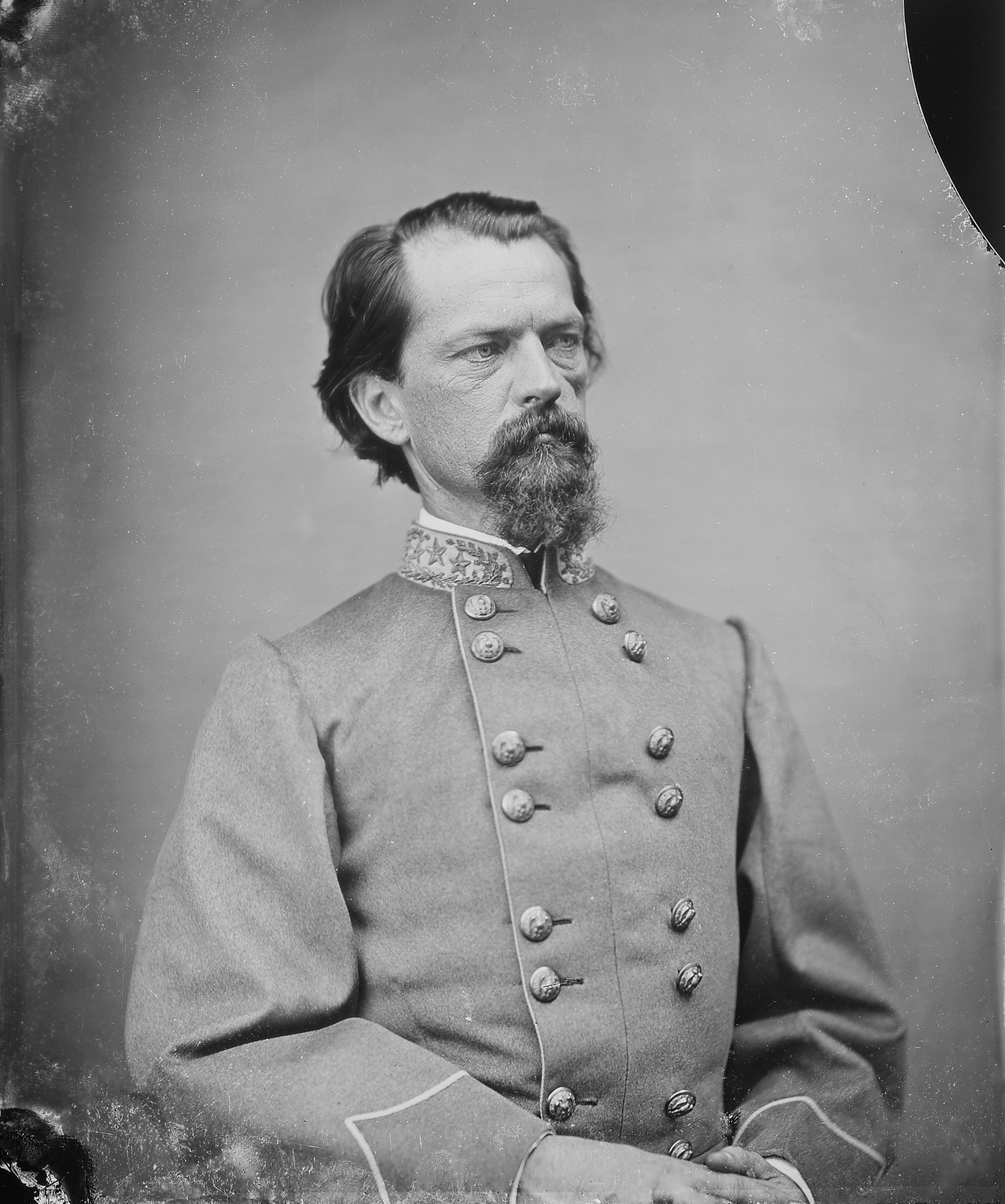
Major General John B. Gordon

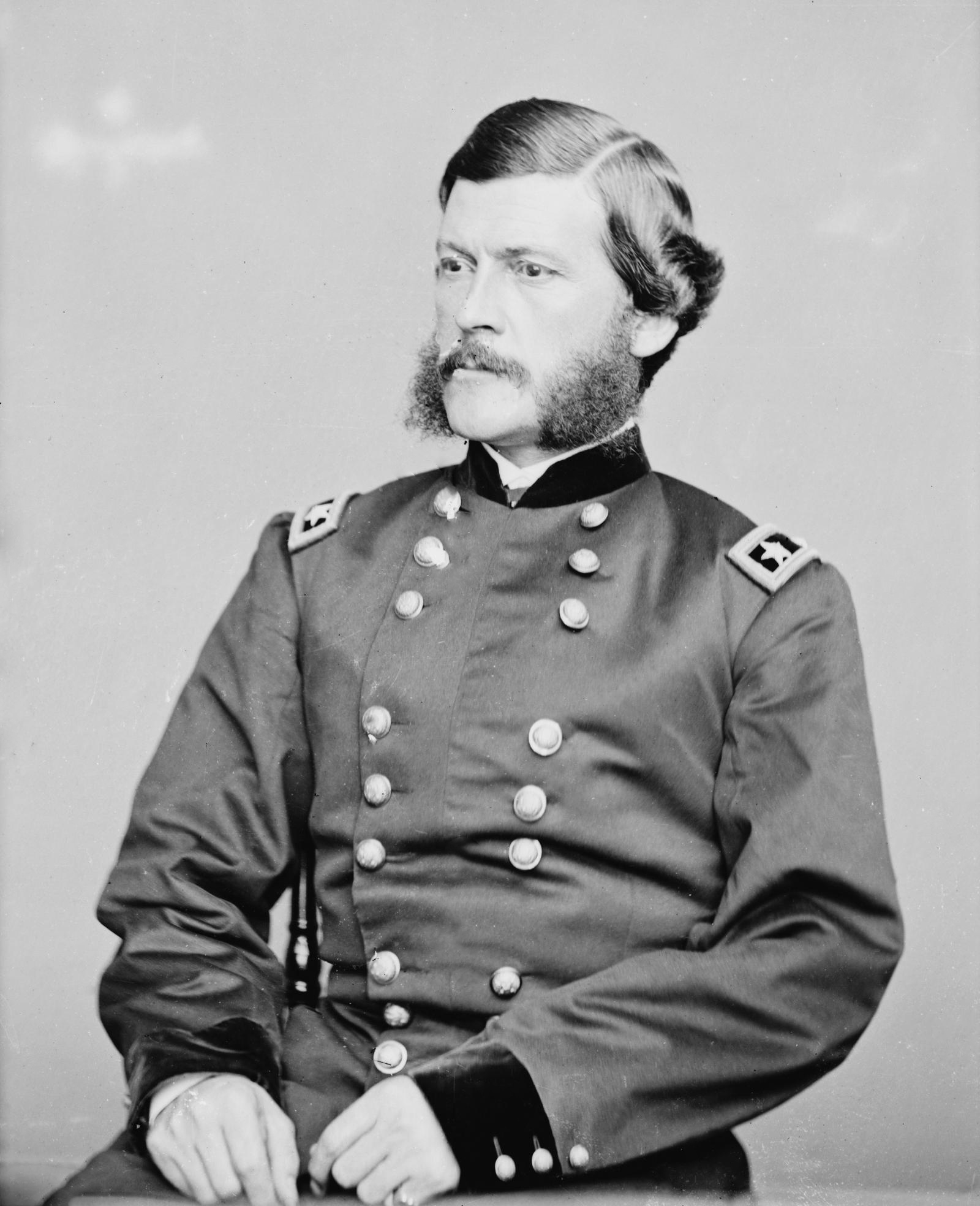
Major General John G. Parke

After Gordon's surprise attack on Fort Stedman in the pre-dawn hours of March 25, 1865, captured the fort, three adjacent batteries and over 500 men while killing and wounding about 500 more, Union forces of the IX Corps under Major General John G. Parke promptly counterattacked. They recaptured the fort and batteries, forced the Confederates to return to their lines and to give up their advance picket line and inflicted about 4,000 casualties, including about 1,000 captured, which the Confederates could ill afford. The United States National Park Service and some historians consider the Battle of Fort Stedman to have been the concluding battle of the siege of Petersburg.

In response to the Confederate attack on Fort Stedman, on the afternoon of March 25, at the Battle of Jones's Farm, Union forces of II Corps and VI Corps captured Confederate picket lines near Armstrong's Mill and extended the left end of the Union line about 0.25 miles (0.40 km) closer to the Confederate fortifications. This put the VI Corps which was holding this section of the line within easy striking distance, about 0.5 miles (0.80 km), of the Confederate line. After the Confederate defeats at Fort Stedman and Jones's Farm, Lee knew that Grant would soon move against the only remaining Confederate supply lines to Petersburg, the Southside Railroad and the Boydton Plank Road.

Meanwhile, on the night of March 25, Major General Philip Sheridan's cavalry arrived at Harrison's Landing on the north bank of the James River. Sheridan's force of about 10,000 troopers was minus a brigade detached to guard prisoners and nearly 3,000 men who were detached because of a lack of replacement horses for those which died or became disabled or unserviceable in the Shenandoah Valley campaign of 1864 and the return to Richmond.

== Campaign prelude ==
The Confederate attack on Fort Stedman did not deter Grant from continuing with his plan of March 24 for an offensive to begin March 29.

=== March 26, 1865 ===
On March 26, 1865, Lee held a council of war at which Lee decided that Major General Cadmus M. Wilcox's division must recapture a crucial elevated portion of their old picket line called McIlwaine's Hill. Also on that date, Lee wrote to Davis that he feared it would be impossible to prevent Sherman joining forces with Grant and that he did not think it prudent to maintain the Confederate army's current positions as Sherman came near to them. After the Fort Stedman defeat, Lee realized that he could not detach only a portion of his army to send to Johnston in North Carolina and still maintain the Richmond and Petersburg defenses.

On the same date, Sheridan's cavalry crossed the James River on a pontoon bridge at Deep Bottom in Henrico County, Virginia, 11 miles (18 km) southeast of Richmond. Sheridan went ahead of his men to meet Grant at his headquarters at Appomattox Manor, the Richard Eppes plantation at City Point, Virginia. Grant told Sheridan that Sheridan would continue to report directly to him, not to Major General George G. Meade as part of the Army of the Potomac. He also assured Sheridan that his force would participate in closing the war in the movements at Petersburg and that Grant gave him discretionary authority to go to North Carolina in his March 24 orders only in the event they were needed. In the afternoon, Grant and Sheridan accompanied President Lincoln on a cruise up the James River.

=== March 27, 1865: Action at McIlwaine's Hill ===
Before dawn on March 27, 1865, about 400 sharpshooters from four of Wilcox's brigades prepared to attack the new Union picket line on McIlwaine's Hill to recapture the line and prevent artillery from threatening important sections of the Confederate defenses. The Confederates approached within 40 yards (37 meters) of the Union line when rifle firing started and the surprised Union pickets were scattered. Then, three Union regiments arrived to reinforce their new picket line but also were driven back by artillery fire from the Confederate line. In the brief but spirited skirmish, the Confederates retook McIlwaine's Hill with few casualties, but this was of minor consequence since Grant's plans for the March 29 offensive did not include an attack along the VI Corps picket line. (Note: The Vermont brigade of Brigadier General Lewis A. Grant reported 33 wounded and 26 captured at McIlwaine's Hill while the brigade of Colonel Thomas W. Hyde made no report but historian A. Wilson Greene says they must have suffered as many casualties as Lewis Grant's brigade. Greene, 2008, pp. 148–149. Only one Confederate regiment reported four wounded while a member of another regiment reported one killed and three wounded in his regiment. Others made no report, which does not mean they suffered no casualties. Greene, 2008, p. 149.)

=== March 27, 1865 ===
Grant and Sherman began a two-day meeting with President Lincoln aboard the River Queen at City Point, Virginia. The meeting was mainly social with Lincoln also asking Sherman to tell him about his march through the Carolinas.

Sheridan went to Hancock Station (Note: This should not be confused with Hancock Station on the Gettysburg Battlefield.) on the morning of March 27, 1865, to organize his forces for the planned operation. Although delayed by a train derailment, Sheridan met with Grant and Sherman at City Point late on March 27 and on the morning of March 28 when he again opposed joining Sherman's forces in North Carolina despite some effort by Sherman to persuade him to take that course of action.

Meade issued orders to the Army of the Potomac in line with Grant's communication to him which would keep all but the mobile II corps and V corps in their lines despite Grant's assurance to Sheridan that he would support Sheridan with the whole army if a battle resulted from his movements. Meade also noted that the mobile infantry was to push the Confederates into their lines and prevent them from opposing Sheridan, which was at odds with Grant's priority to defeat the enemy in battle.

Lee learned that Sheridan's cavalry had moved south of the James River and suspected that Sheridan would attack the South Side Railroad beyond his right (western) flank. He knew he would have to strengthen that end of the line while maintaining the rest of his lines and preparing to leave the Richmond–Petersburg defenses. Lee only had about 6,000 cavalrymen about 18 miles (29 km) south of Petersburg at Stony Creek Station and Major General George E. Pickett's division of about 5,000 effective infantrymen available to extend his lines.

=== March 28, 1865 ===
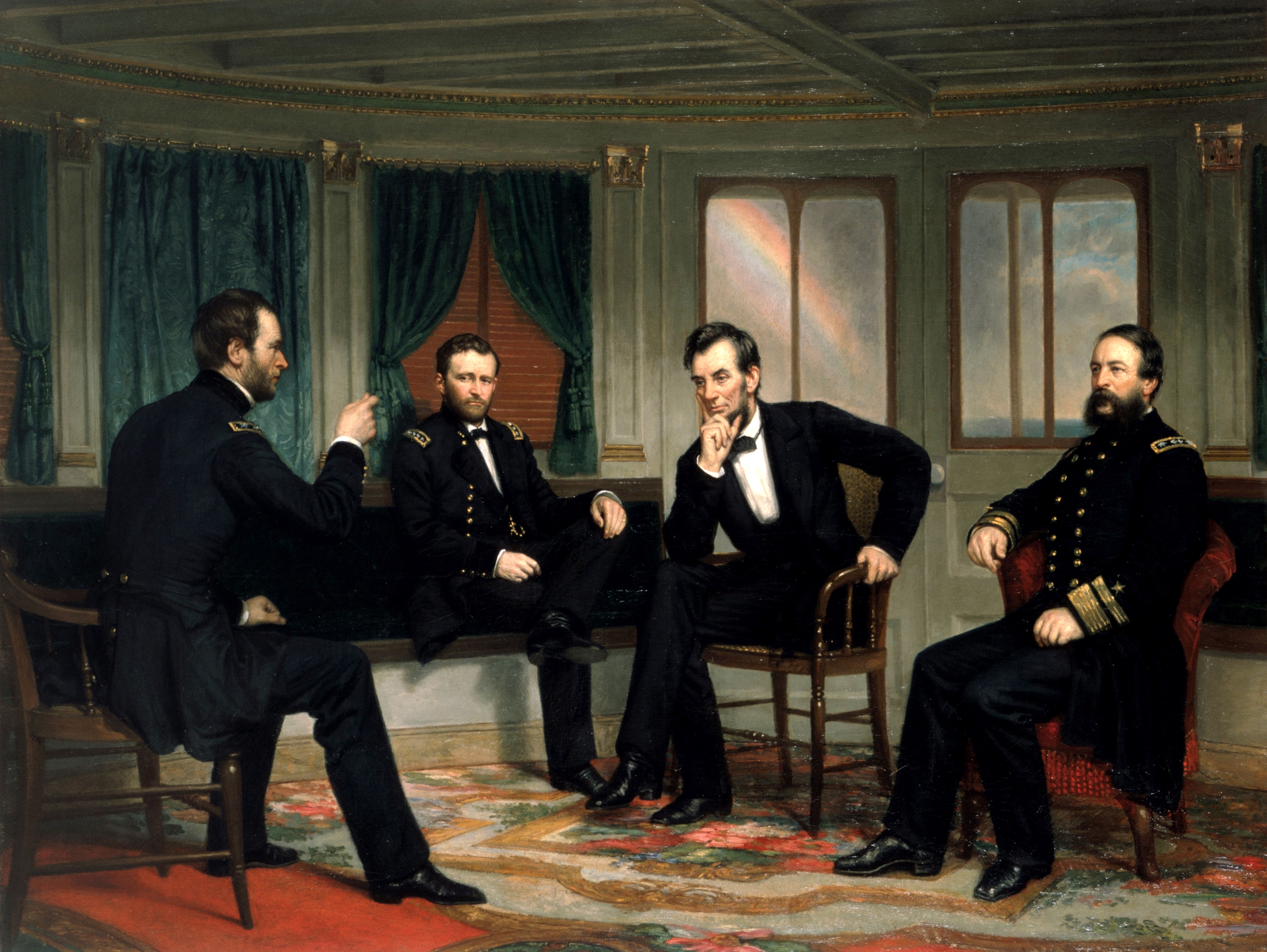
The Peacemakers by George Peter Alexander Healy, 1868, depicts the historic 1865 meeting on the River Queen

Grant, Sherman, and Lincoln, joined by Rear Admiral David Dixon Porter, met again on the River Queen. The generals outlined their strategies and told Lincoln they anticipated the need for one more campaign, although Lincoln expressed his hope that much further bloodshed could be avoided. This was the only conference at which Lincoln conferred with his top military officers about post-war policies. Admiral Porter made notes that night in which he recorded that Lincoln wanted the Confederates to be let go and treated liberally. Porter quoted Lincoln as saying that his only desire was for "those people to return to their allegiance to the Union and submit to the laws." Lincoln also indicated that he did not want the generals making political settlements with the Confederates.

On the night of March 25, Major General Edward Ord quietly moved units from the Union Army of the James, including two divisions of Major General John Gibbon's XXIV Corps, a division of Major General Godfrey Weitzel's XXV Corps and Brigadier General Ranald S. Mackenzie's cavalry division from the Richmond lines to fill in the Petersburg lines when the II Corps moved out of them to support Sheridan. Confederate Lieutenant General James Longstreet's corps defending the Richmond lines failed to detect the movement of Ord's men, which held Lee back from moving some of Longstreet's forces to defend against the movement of Grant's forces. Ord's men began their march on March 27–28 and arrived near Hatcher's Run to take the positions occupied by the II Corps on the morning of March 29. Brigadier General Ranald Mackenzie's cavalry division from the Army of the James joined Sheridan on March 28.

On the night of March 28, 1865, Grant modified his order, telling Sheridan to lead his troopers around the Confederate right flank and to fight the Confederates, with infantry support, if the Confederates came out of their trenches. Otherwise, Sheridan was to wreck the railroads as much as possible and again was told, at his discretion, that he could return to the Petersburg lines or join Sherman in North Carolina. (Note: Grant again privately assured Sheridan that he did not intend for Sheridan to go North Carolina but only to give him discretion in the event the planned offensive was unsuccessful. Bearss, 2014, p. 316.) Sheridan was told to move first to the rear of the V Corps and around their left flank to Dinwiddie Court House in an effort to outflank the Confederates and cut the Boydton Plank Road.

Grant ordered Warren's V Corps to outflank Lee's line and to support Sheridan's cavalry. Warren's corps moved out at 3:00 a.m. over the Vaughan Road toward Dinwiddie Court House. Warren's orders were subsequently modified to make a movement over the Quaker Road toward the Confederate defenses. Grant ordered Humphrey's II Corps to march at 9:00 a.m. to positions from the Quaker Road-Vaughan Road intersection to Hatcher's Run. Warren was to move along the Boydton Plank Road to cut that key Confederate communication line. Both corps were ordered to keep the Confederates in their trenches while the Union advance proceeded.

Anticipating the Union moves, Lee ordered Major Generals Fitzhugh Lee's, W.H.F. "Rooney" Lee's and Thomas L. Rosser's cavalry divisions to defend the western end of the line, including the important road junction of Five Forks in Dinwiddie County. Fitzhugh Lee started that day, leaving Longstreet with only Brigadier General Martin Gary's cavalry brigade for scouting duties. Lee also prepared for Major General George Pickett to move his men to join the cavalry and take command. Five Forks was along the shortest route to the South Side Railroad. Lee ordered the movement of the infantry the next morning when he learned that Union forces were headed toward Dinwiddie Court House. With his trenches ending at the Claiborne Road-White Oak intersection, Lee had to send Pickett 4 miles (6.4 km) past the end of the Confederate line of defenses in order to defend Five Forks.

== Opposing forces ==
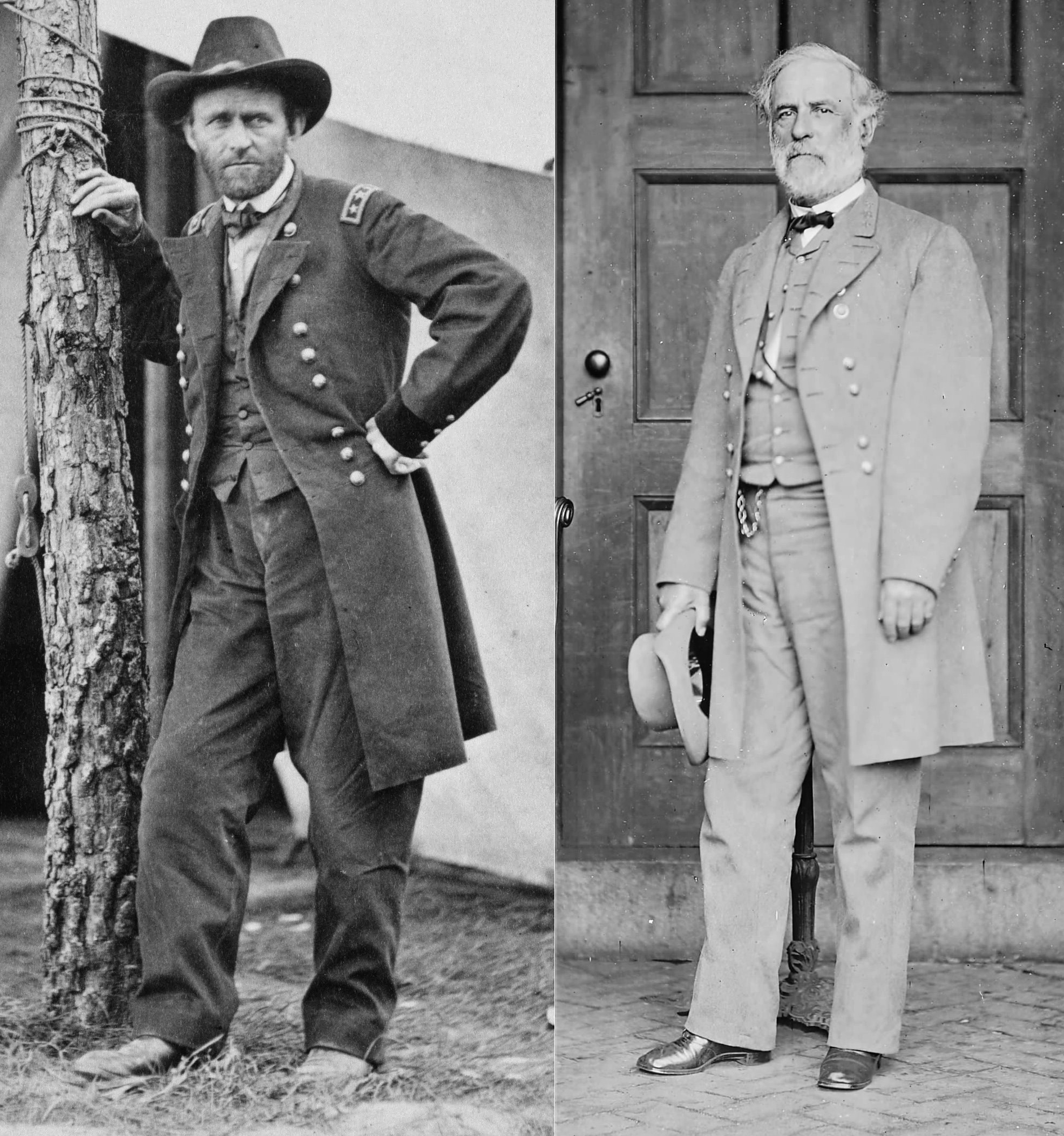
Opposing commanders: Lt. Gen. Ulysses S. Grant, USA, at Cold Harbor, photographed by Edgar Guy Fawx in 1864; Gen. Robert E. Lee, CSA, photographed by Mathew Brady in 1865

=== Union ===
Key Union commanders
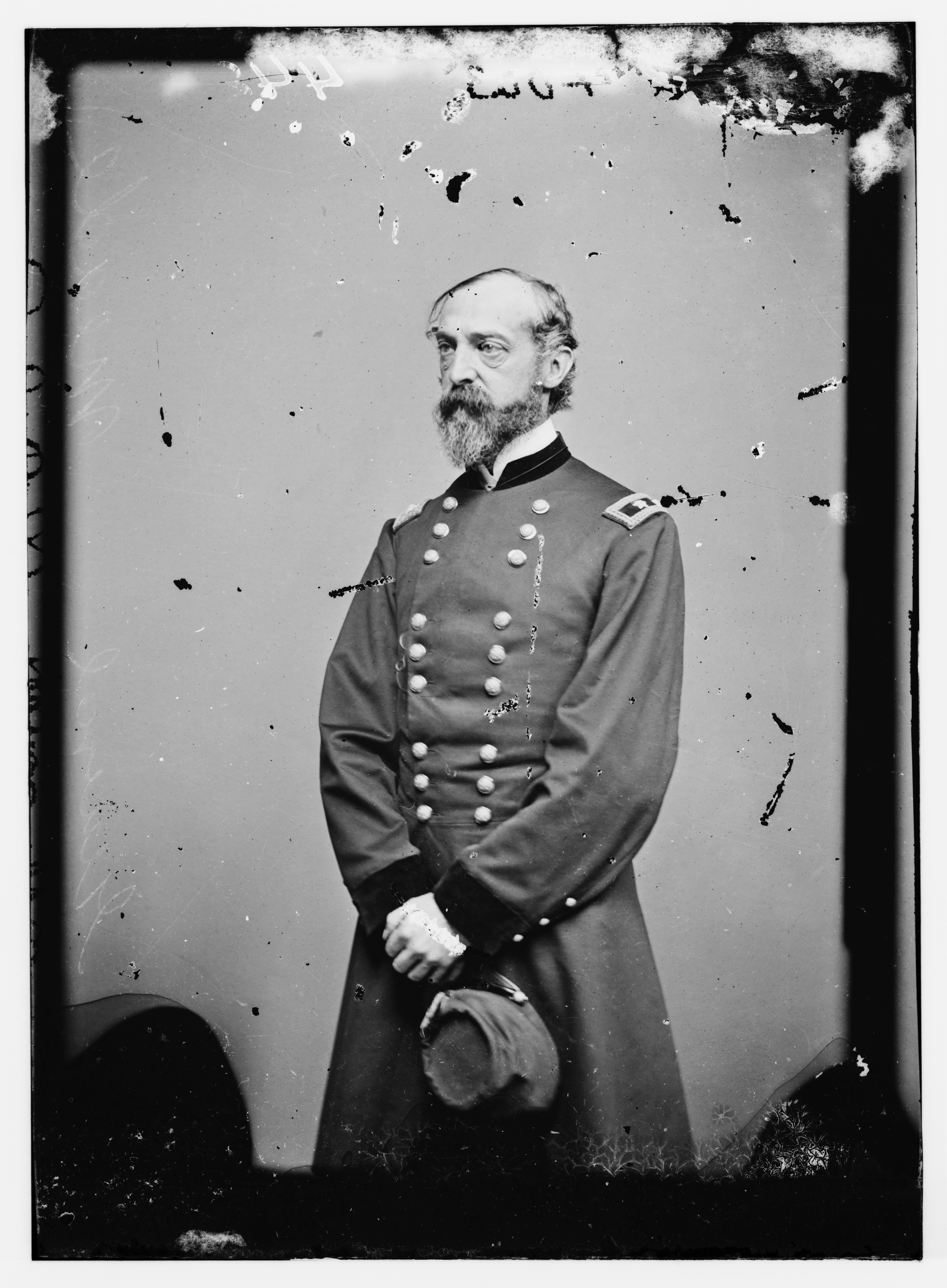
Maj. Gen.
George G. Meade

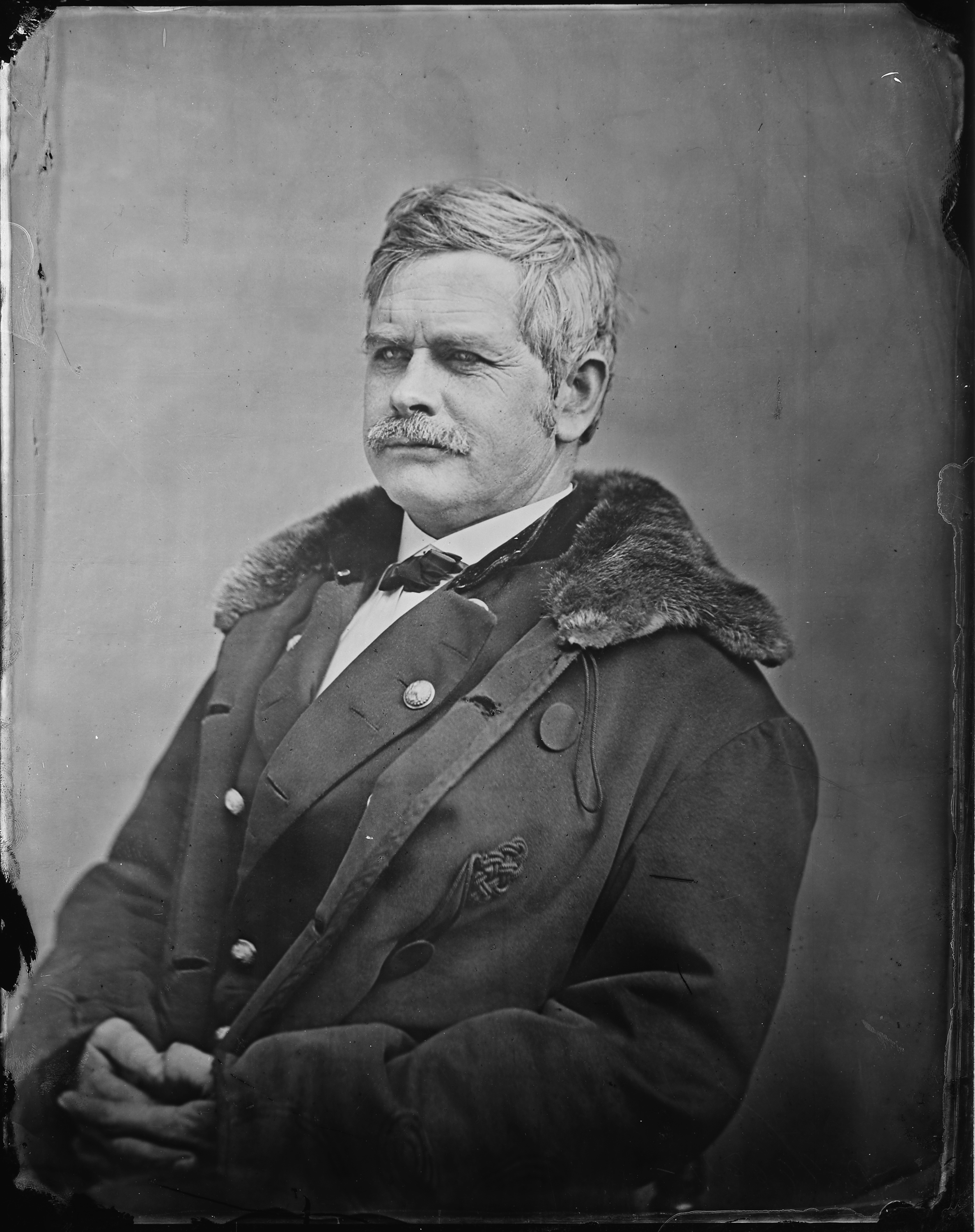
Maj. Gen.
Edward O. C. Ord

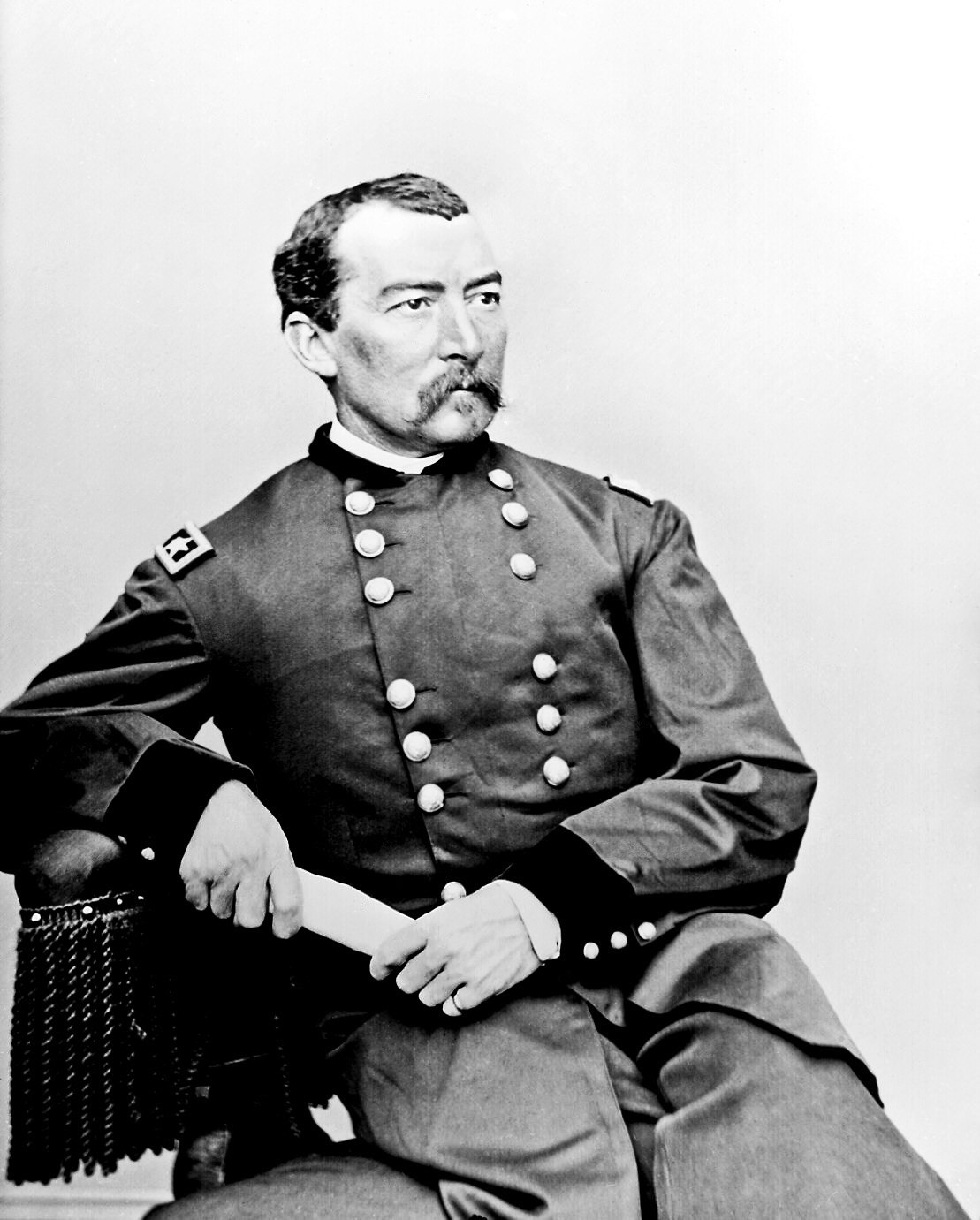
Maj. Gen.
Philip H. Sheridan

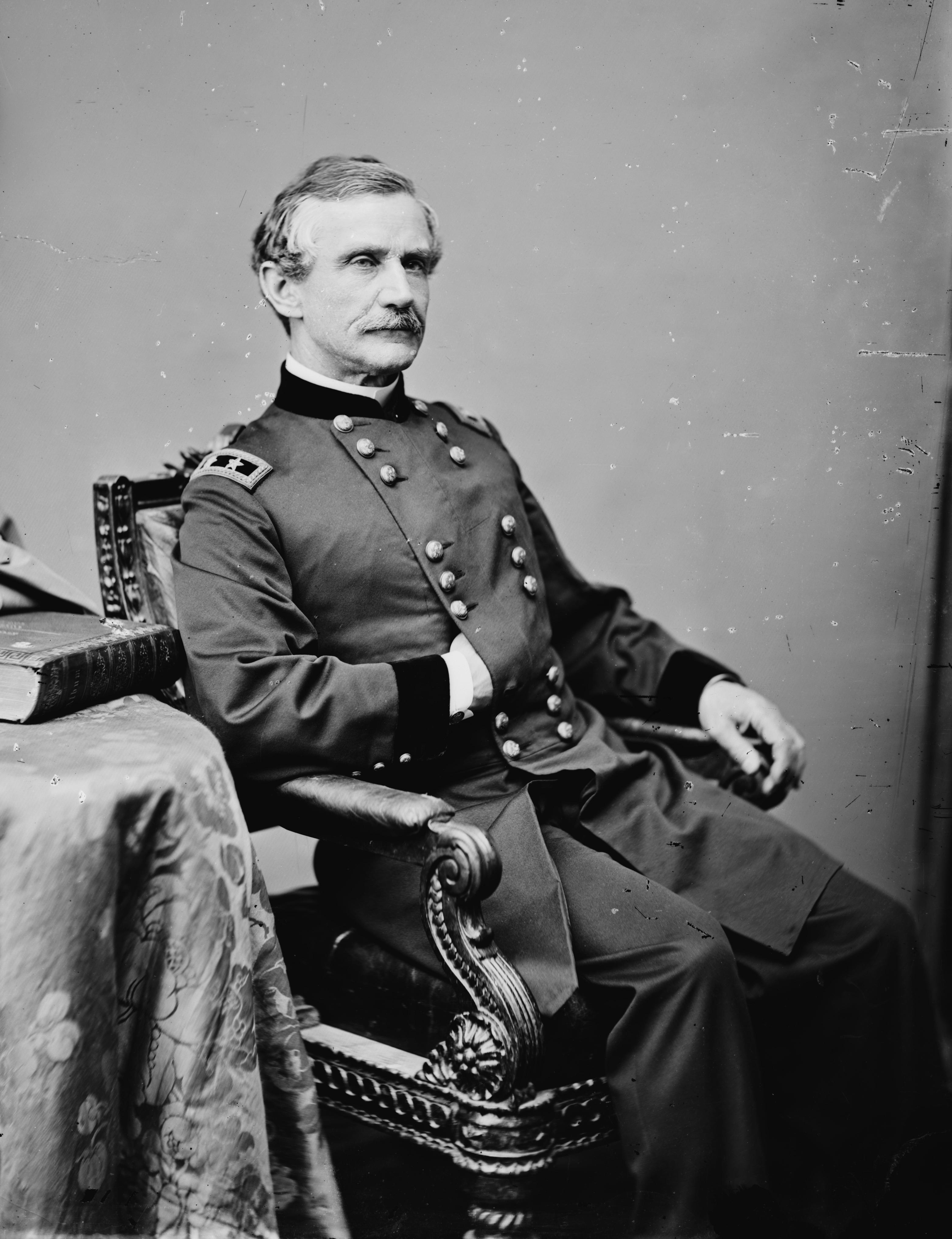
Maj. Gen.
Andrew A. Humphreys

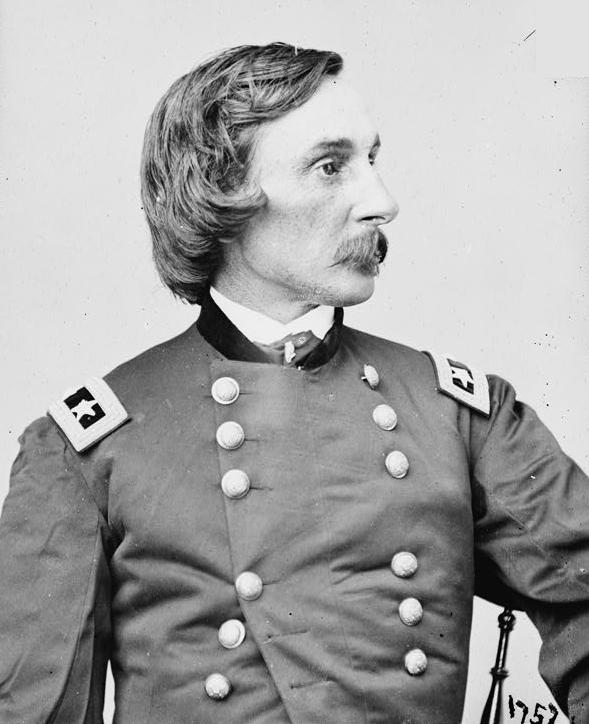
Maj. Gen.
Gouverneur K. Warren

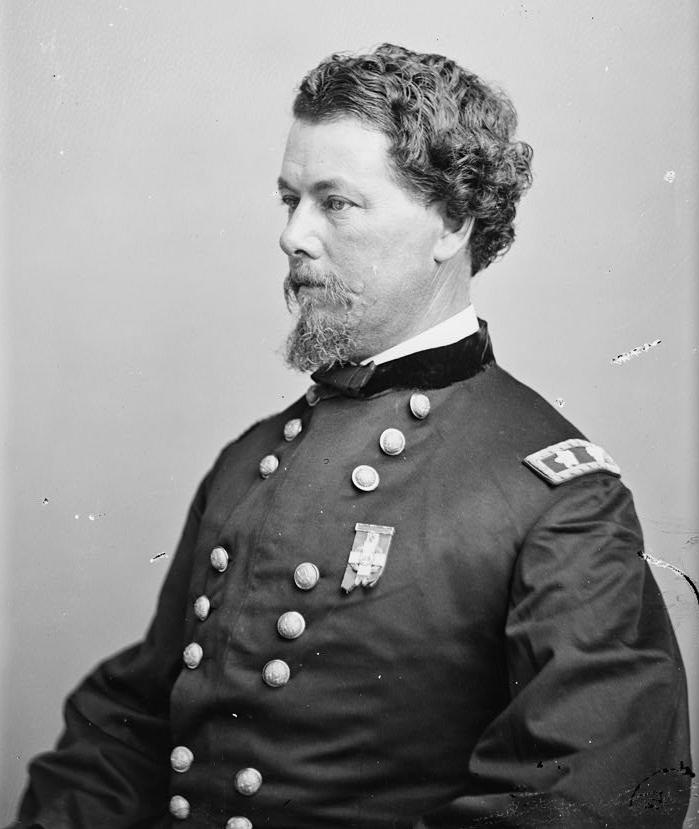
Maj. Gen.
Horatio G. Wright

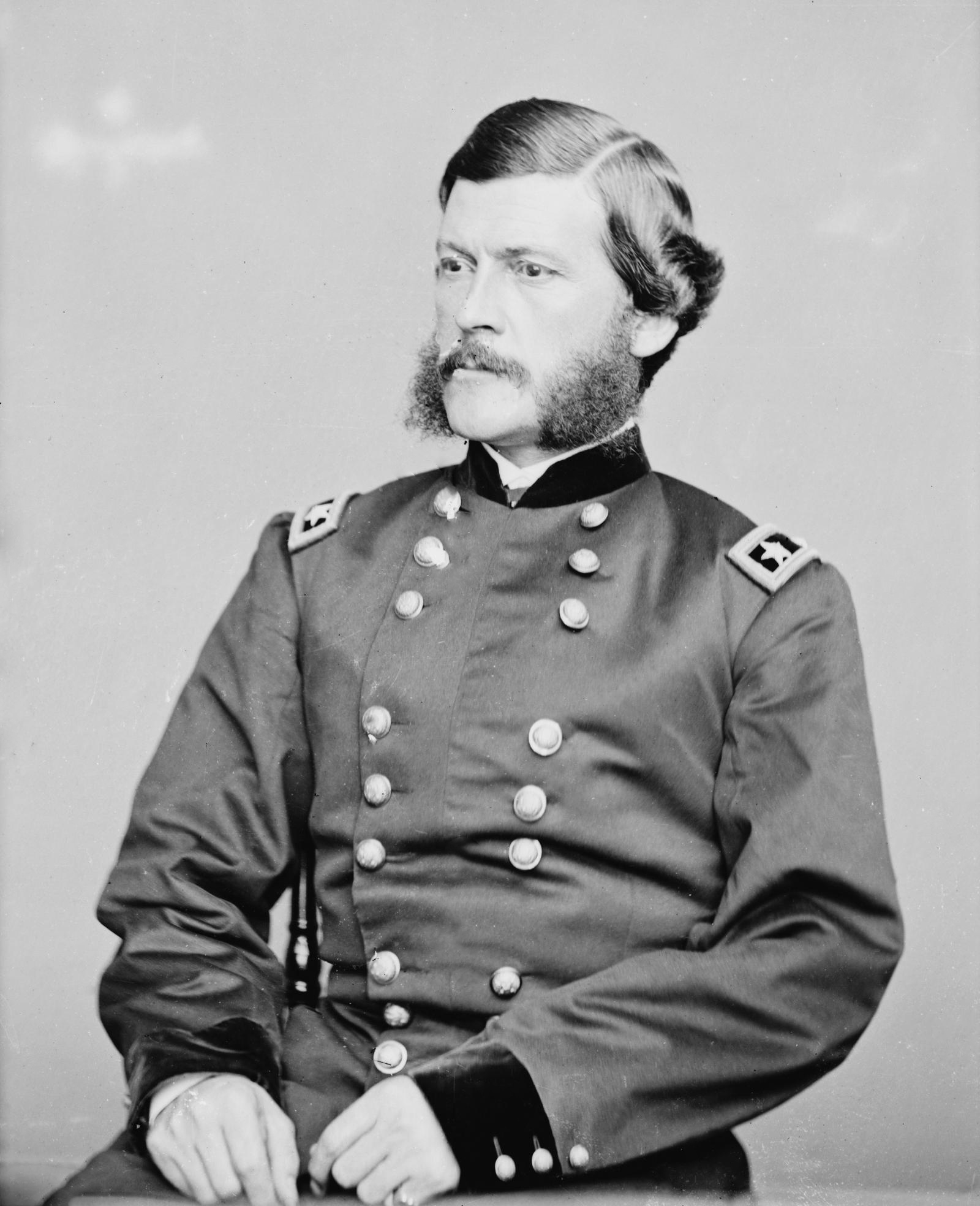
Maj. Gen.
John G. Parke

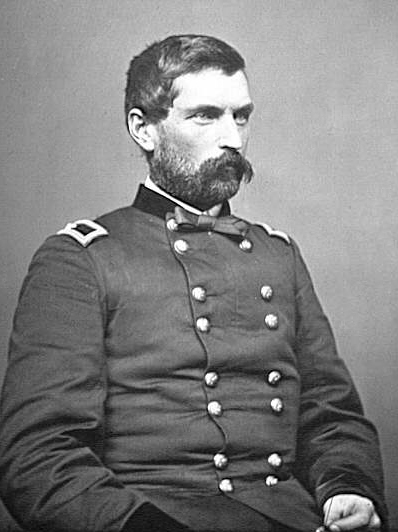
Maj. Gen.
John Gibbon

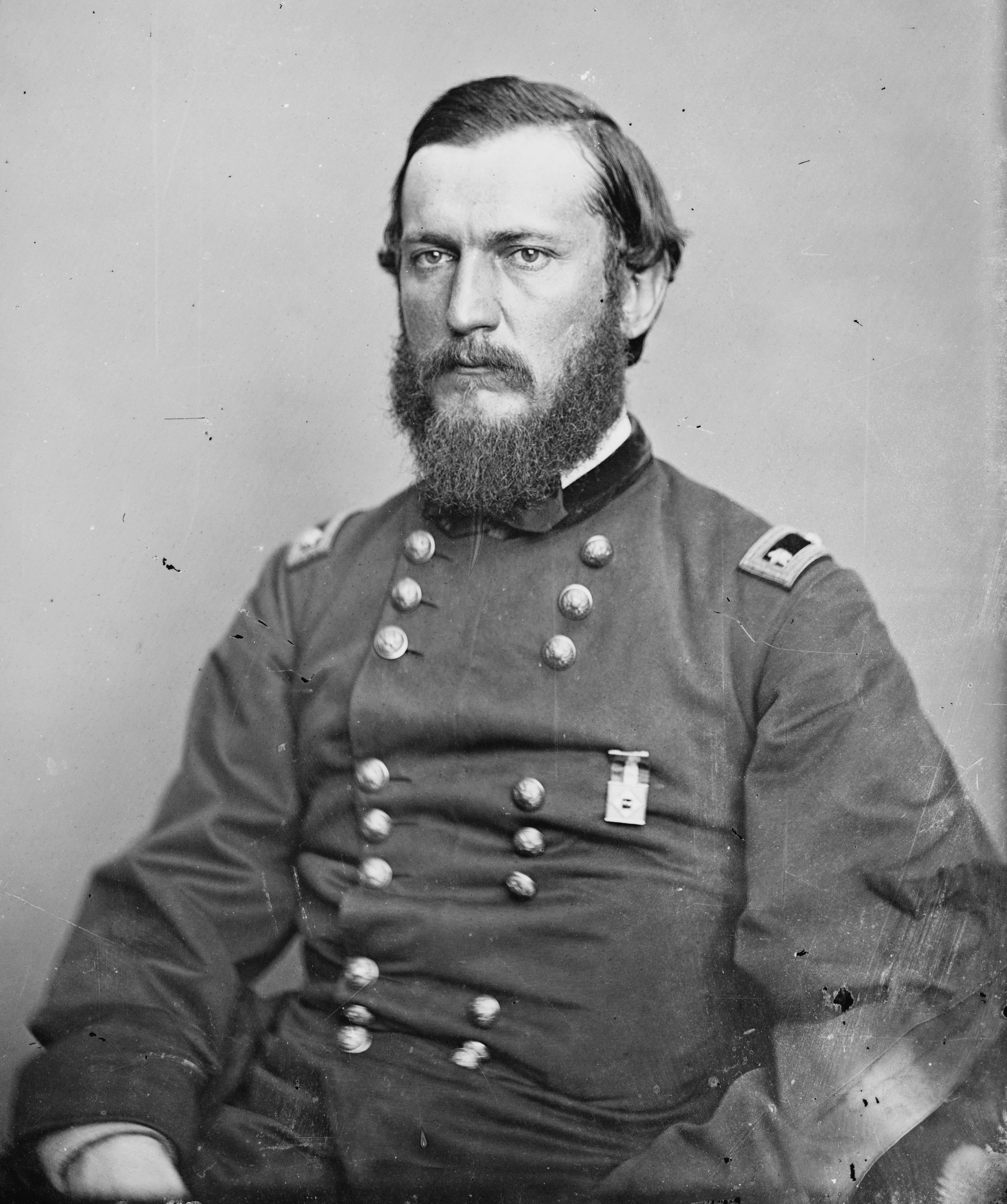
Maj. Gen.
Godfrey Weitzel

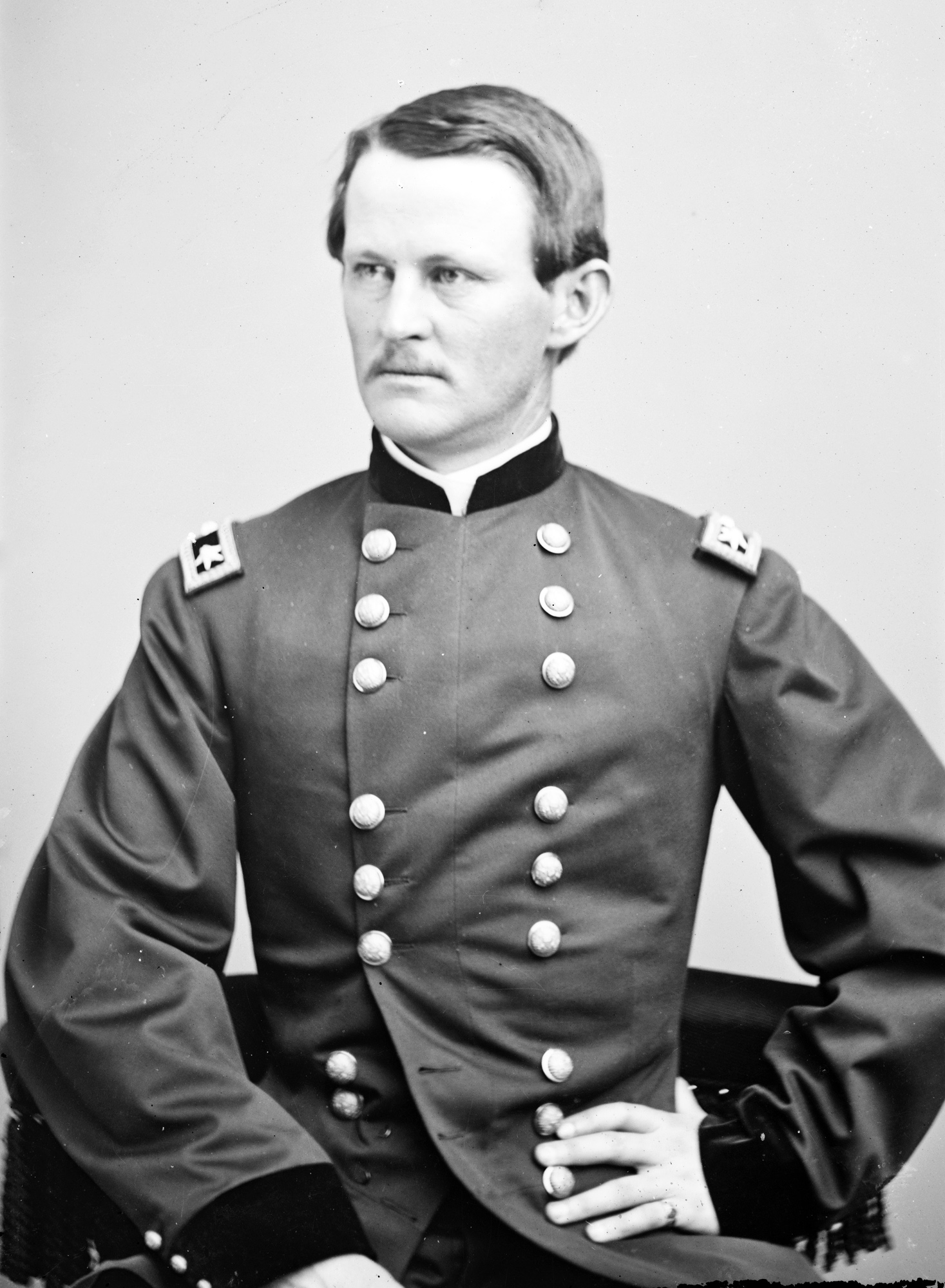
Maj. Gen.
Wesley Merritt

Grant's Union forces totaled approximately 114,000 men. They consisted of the Army of the Potomac, under Maj. Gen. George Meade, the Army of the James, under Maj. Gen. Edward O. C. Ord, and the Army of the Shenandoah, under Philip H. Sheridan.

- Army of the Potomac:
- II Corps, under Maj. Gen. Andrew A. Humphreys, including the divisions of Bvt. Maj. Gen. Nelson A. Miles, Brig. Gen. William Hays, and Bvt. Maj. Gen. Gershom Mott.
- V Corps, under Maj. Gen. Gouverneur K. Warren, including the divisions of Bvt. Maj. Gens. Charles Griffin, Romeyn B. Ayres, and Samuel W. Crawford.
- VI Corps, under Maj. Gen. Horatio Wright, including the divisions of Bvt. Maj. Gens. Frank Wheaton, George W. Getty, and Brig. Gen. Truman Seymour.
- IX Corps, under Maj. Gen. John G. Parke, including the divisions of Bvt. Maj. Gens. Orlando B. Willcox, Robert B. Potter, and Brig. Gen. John F. Hartranft.
- 2nd Division, Cavalry Corps, under Maj. Gen. George Crook, including the brigades of Bvt. Maj. Gen. Henry E. Davies, and Bvt. Brig. Gens. John I. Gregg, and Charles H. Smith (The other two divisions of the cavalry corps had been detached from the Army of the Potomac to form the Army of the Shenandoah).
- Army of the James:
- Defenses of Bermuda Hundred, under Maj. Gen. George L. Hartsuff, including the division of Bvt. Maj. Gen. Edward Ferrero and a separate brigade under Brig. Gen. Joseph B. Carr
- XXIV Corps, under Maj. Gen. John Gibbon, including the divisions of Brig. Gens. Robert Sanford Foster and Charles Devens, and an independent division of Bvt. Maj. Gen. John Wesley Turner.
- XXV Corps, under Maj. Gen. Godfrey Weitzel, including the divisions of Bvt. Maj. Gen. August V. Kautz and Brig. Gen. William Birney.
- Cavalry under Ranald S. Mackenzie, including the brigades of Col. Robert P. West and Col. Samuel P. Spear.
- Army of the Shenandoah:
- Cavalry Corps, under Maj. Gen. Wesley Merritt, including the divisions of Brig. Gen Thomas C. Devin and Bvt. Major Gen. George A. Custer (The 2nd Division of the Cavalry Corps, under George Crook, remained attached to the Army of the Potomac).

=== Confederate ===
Key Confederate commanders
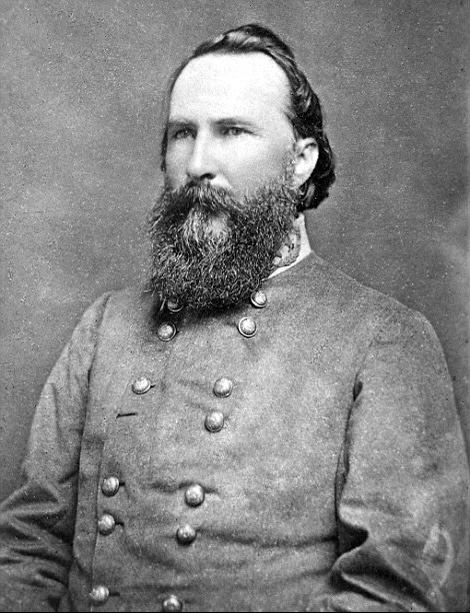
Lt. Gen. James Longstreet, First Corps

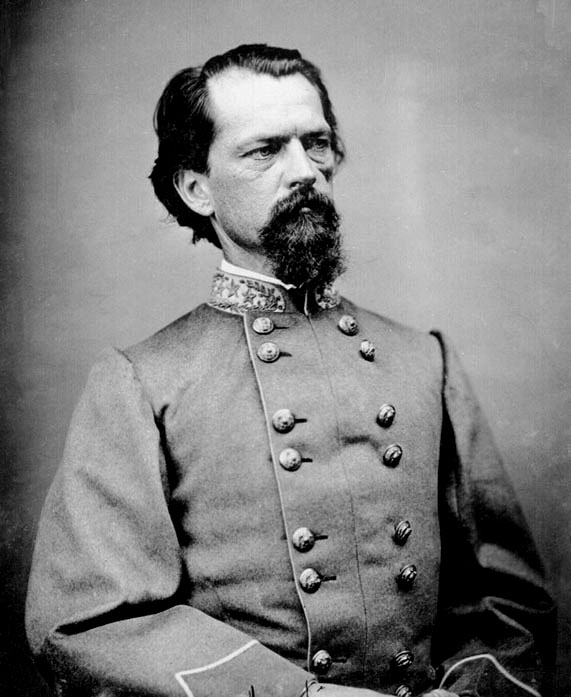
Maj. Gen. John B. Gordon

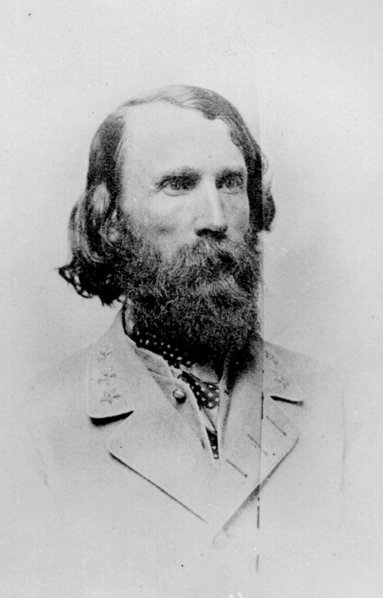
Lt. Gen. A.P. Hill

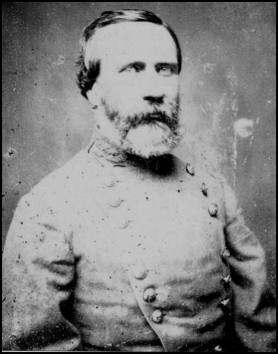
Lt. Gen. Richard H. Anderson

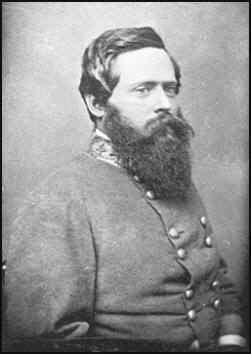
Maj. Gen. Fitzhugh Lee

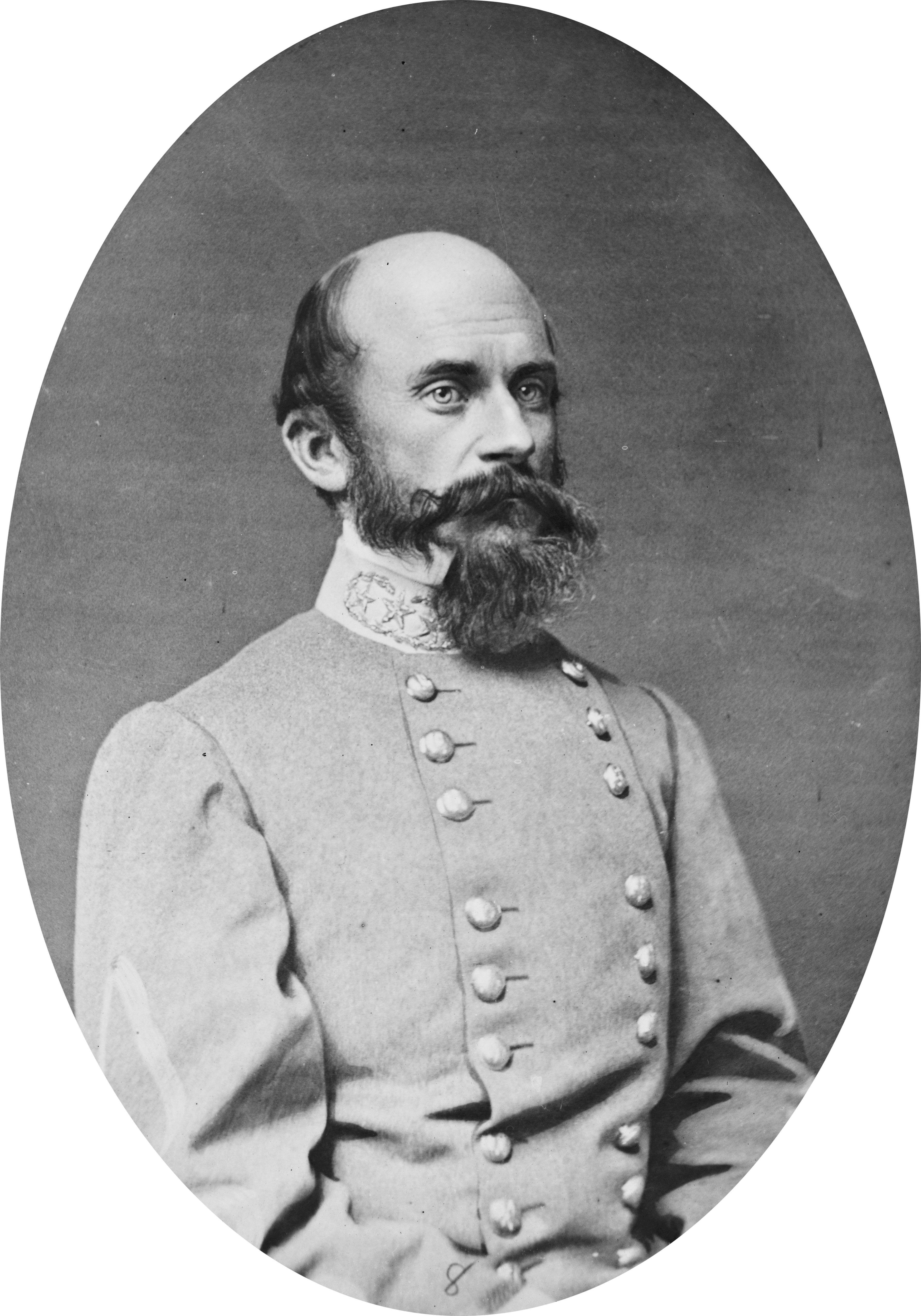
Lt. Gen. Richard S. Ewell

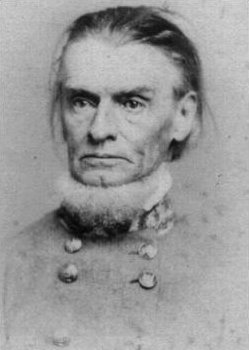
Brig. Gen. Henry A. Wise

Lee's Confederate Army of Northern Virginia was composed of about 56,000 men and was organized into four infantry corps and a cavalry corps. Also under Lee's command in this campaign was the Department of Richmond, and the Department of North Carolina and Southern Virginia.

- First Corps, under Lt. Gen. James Longstreet, including the divisions of Maj. Gens. George E. Pickett, Charles W. Field, and Joseph B. Kershaw.
- Second Corps, under Maj. Gen. John B. Gordon, including the divisions of Maj. Gen. Bryan Grimes, and Brig. Gens. James A. Walker and Clement A. Evans.
- Third Corps, under Lt. Gen. A.P. Hill, including the divisions of Maj. Gens. William Mahone, Henry Heth, and Cadmus Wilcox.
- Fourth Corps, under Lt. Gen. Richard H. Anderson, including the division of Maj. Gen. Bushrod Johnson.
- Cavalry Corps, under Maj. Gen. Fitzhugh Lee, including the divisions of Col. Thomas Munford, and Maj. Gens. William H. F. Lee and Thomas L. Rosser.
- Department of Richmond, under Lt. Gen. Richard S. Ewell, including a division under Maj. Gen. George W. C. Lee.
- Department of North Carolina and Southern Virginia, under Brig. Gen. Henry A. Wise.

== Union offensive ==
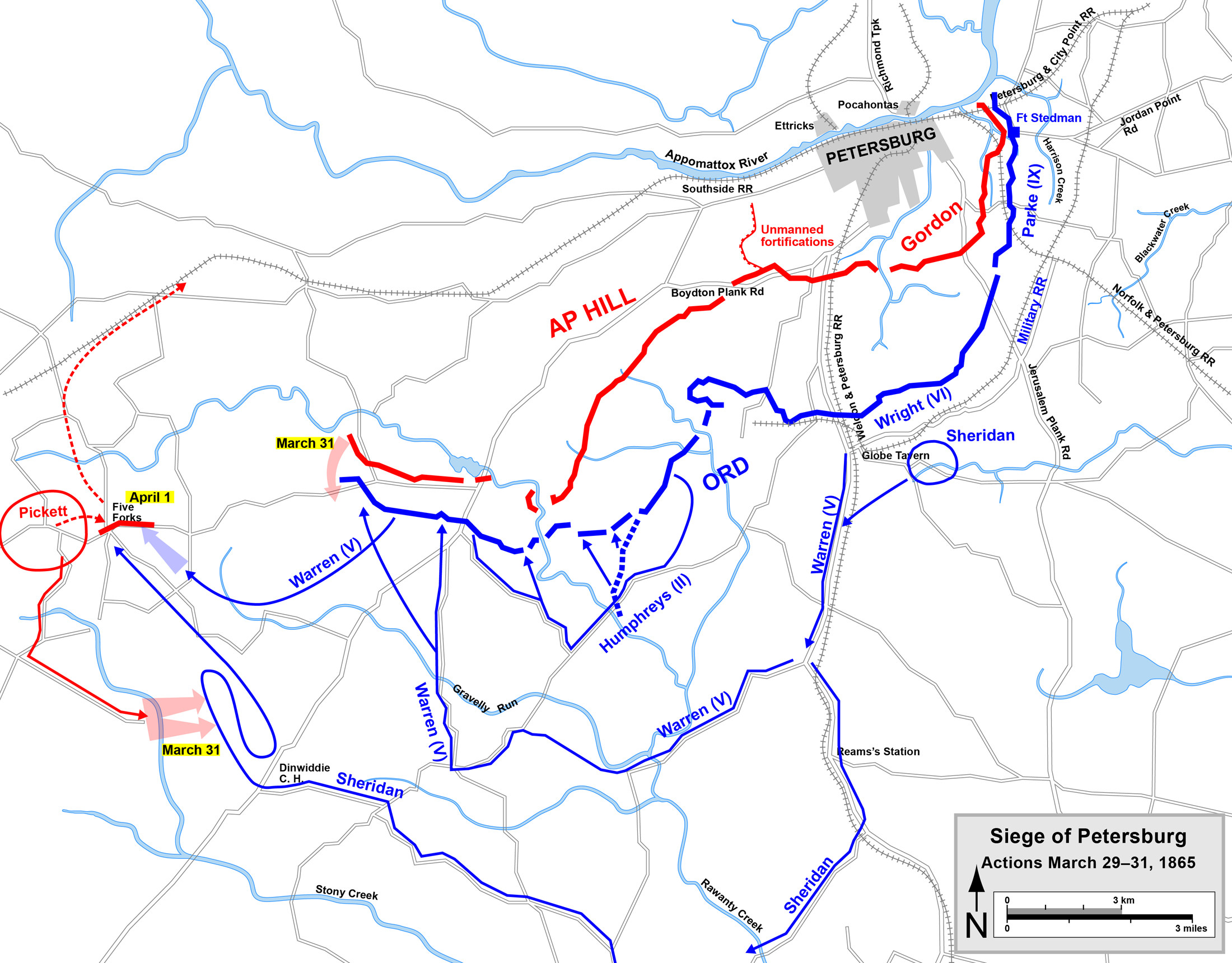
Actions at Petersburg before and during the Battle of Five Forks

=== Lewis's Farm (March 29, 1865) ===
Warren's V Corps, followed by Humphrey's II Corps, and further to the south, Sheridan's cavalry corps, moved south and west early on March 29, 1865. Their mission was to occupy Dinwiddie Court House, cut the Boydton Plank Road, Southside Railroad and Richmond and Danville Railroad and to outflank the Confederates on their western (right) flank at the end of their White Oak Road line southwest of Petersburg. Under revised orders, Warren sent Brigadier General (Brevet Major General) Charles Griffin's First Division north on the Quaker Road toward the intersection with the Boydton Plank Road and the end of the White Oak Road Line. Brigadier General Joshua Chamberlain's First Brigade led the advance.

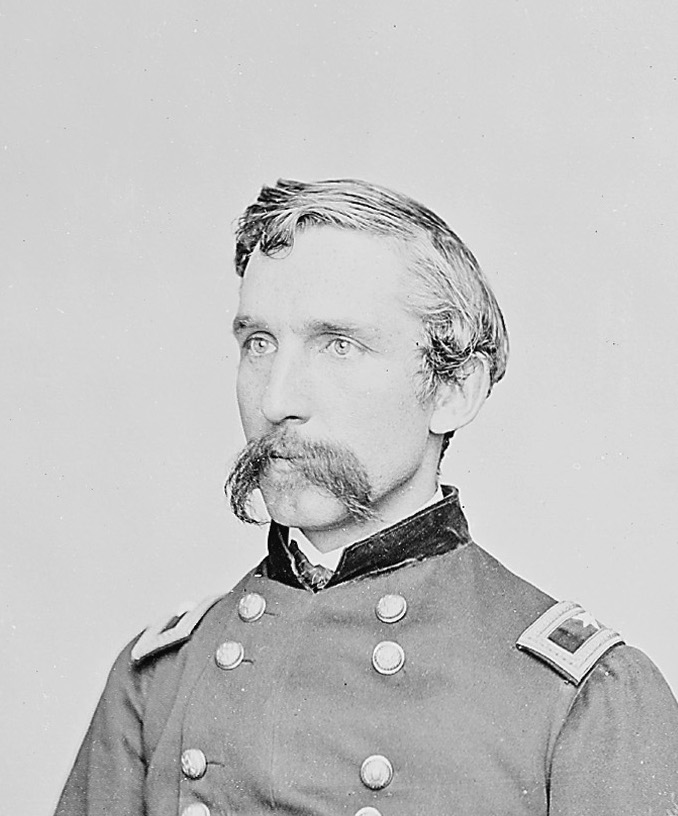
Brigadier General Joshua Chamberlain

North on Quaker Road, across Rowanty Creek at the Lewis Farm, Chamberlain's men encountered the brigades of Brigadier Generals Henry A. Wise, William Henry Wallace and Young Marshall Moody which had been sent by Lieutenant General Richard H. Anderson and Major General Bushrod Johnson to turn back the Union advance. Chamberlain was wounded and almost captured during the ensuing back-and-forth battle. Chamberlain's brigade, reinforced by a four-gun artillery battery and regiments from the brigades of Colonel (Brevet Brigadier General) Edgar M. Gregory and Colonel (Brevet Brigadier General) Alfred L. Pearson, who was later awarded the Medal of Honor, drove the Confederates back to the White Oak Road Line. The Union force suffered 381 casualties; the Confederates suffered 371.

After the battle, Griffin's division moved up to occupy the junction of the Quaker Road and Boydton Plank Road near the end of the White Oak Road Line. Late in the afternoon, Sheridan's cavalry occupied Dinwiddie Court House on the Boydton Plank Road without opposition. Union forces had cut the Boydton Plank Road in two places, were close to the end of the Confederate line and had a large force in a strong position to attack the crucial road junction at Five Forks in Dinwiddie County to which Lee was just sending defenders. The two remaining Confederate railroad connections with Petersburg and Richmond would be within the Union Army's grasp if they took Five Forks.

Encouraged by the Confederate failure to press their attack at Lewis's Farm and their withdrawal to the White Oak Road Line, Grant expanded Sheridan's mission to a major offensive rather than just a railroad raid and a forced extension of the Confederate line. He wrote in his letter to Sheridan: "I now feel like ending the matter...."

=== March 30, 1865 ===
==== Dinwiddie Court House and Five Forks ====
From the late afternoon on March 29 through March 30, 1865, the Union's mobile strike force continued to move into positions to turn the Confederate right flank and block the Confederates' open supply, and retreat, routes. Lee perceived the threat from the Union moves and thinned his lines to strengthen the defenses on his far right. He also organized a Confederate mobile force to protect the key junction of Five Forks in order to keep open the Southside Railroad and important roads and to drive the Union force back from its advanced position. A steady, heavy rain started on the afternoon of March 29 and continued through March 30, slowing movements and limiting actions on March 30.

At about 5 p.m., on March 29, two of Sheridan's divisions, the First commanded by Brigadier General Thomas Devin and, the Second, detached from the Army of the Potomac, commanded by Major General George Crook entered Dinwiddie Court House. Sheridan posted guards at the roads entering the town for protection from Confederate patrols. Sheridan's Third Division commanded by Brigadier General (Brevet Major General) George Armstrong Custer was 7 miles (11 km) behind Sheridan's main force protecting the bogged down wagon trains. The First and Third Divisions were still under the direct command of Brigadier General (Brevet Major General) Wesley Merritt as an unofficial cavalry corps commander of the still existing Army of the Shenandoah.

Although Fitzhugh Lee's cavalry division passed through Petersburg and reached Sutherland Station about the time Sheridan reached Dinwiddie Court House, Thomas Rosser's and "Rooney" Lee's divisions had to detour around Sheridan's force in their moves from positions at Spencer's Mill on the Nottoway River and Stony Creek Station and did not arrive at Sutherland Station until March 30. At Sutherland Station earlier that day, General Lee verbally told Major General Fitzhugh Lee to take command of the cavalry and to attack Sheridan at Dinwiddie Court House. When Rosser and Rooney Lee's divisions arrived at Five Forks on the night of March 30, Fitzhugh Lee took overall command of the cavalry and put Colonel Thomas T. Munford in command of his own division.

Early in the day on March 29, Lee sent Major General George Pickett with three of his brigades commanded by Brigadier Generals William R. Terry, Montgomery Corse and George H. Steuart on the deteriorated Southside Railroad to Sutherland Station. The trains shuttling the troops to Sutherland Station were so slow that it was late night before the last of Pickett's men reached Sutherland Station, 10 miles (16 km) west of Petersburg. From Sutherland Station, Pickett moved south on the Claiborne Road to White Oak Road and Burgess Mill near the end of the Confederate line where he picked up the two brigades of Brigadier Generals Matt Ransom and William Henry Wallace from Major General Bushrod Johnson's division, along with a six-gun battery under Colonel William Pegram to deploy to Five Forks.

On March 30, General Lee met with several officers including Anderson, Pickett and Heth at Sutherland Station. From there, Lee ordered Pickett to move 4 miles (6.4 km) west along White Oak Road to Five Forks. Lee instructed Pickett to join with Fitzhugh Lee's cavalry and attack Sheridan at Dinwiddie Court House with the objective of driving Sheridan's force further away from the Confederate supply lines.

Skirmishing with and reacting to feints from Union patrols from the 6th Pennsylvania Cavalry under Colonel Charles L. Leiper delayed Pickett's force from reaching Five Forks until 4:30 p.m. When Pickett reached Five Forks where Fitzhugh Lee's cavalry were waiting, he conferred with Lee about whether to proceed toward Dinwiddie Court House then. Pickett decided because of the late hour and the absence of the other cavalry divisions to wait until morning to move his tired men against Sheridan at Five Forks. Pickett did send William R. Terry's and Montgomery Corse's brigades to an advanced position south of Five Forks to guard against surprise attack. Some of Devin's men skirmished with the advanced infantry brigades before the Confederates were able to settle into their positions. By 9:45 p.m., Pickett's force was deployed along the White Oak Road.

On March 30, Union cavalry patrols from Brigadier General Thomas Devin's division approached the Confederate line along White Oak Road at Five Forks and skirmished with Fitzhugh Lee's cavalry division. As they approached Five Forks, a patrol of the 6th United States Cavalry Regiment under Major Robert M. Morris encountered Fitzhugh Lee's troopers and lost 3 officers and 20 men in the encounter. The Confederates also suffered some casualties, including Brigadier General William H. F. Payne who was wounded.

As the rain continued on March 30, Grant sent a note to Sheridan in which he said that cavalry operations seemed to be impossible and perhaps he should leave enough men to hold his position and return to Humphreys' Station for forage. He even suggested going by way of Stony Creek Station to destroy or capture Confederate supplies there. Sheridan responded by going to Grant's headquarters which had been moved forward to near the Vaughan Road crossing of Gravelly Run on the night of March 30 to urge him to press ahead regardless of the weather and road conditions. (Note: Sheridan supported his argument by the false statement that his men had already reached White Oak Road at Five Forks. Bearss, 2014, p. 358.) In fact, when Devin's men had been driven back from Five Forks, they had encamped about a mile away at the John Boisseau house. During their discussions, Grant told Sheridan he would send him the V Corps for infantry support and that his new orders were not to extend the line further but to turn the Confederate flank and to break Lee's army. Sheridan wanted the VI Corps which had fought with him in the Shenandoah Valley. Grant told him that the VI Corps was too far from his position to make the move.

==== White Oak Road line ====
Following the Battle of Lewis's Farm, in the heavy rain on the night of March 29, Lee sent McGowan's brigade to bolster Anderson's defense of the end of the Confederate line. MacRae's brigade also was moved to the west of Burgess Mill. Wilcox's three other brigades had to spread out to cover the vacated defenses. McGowan's and MacRae's brigades did not give Johnson enough men to extend his line to Five Forks.

With the gap between the end of the Confederate defensive line southwest of Petersburg and Pickett's force at Five Forks in mind, on March 30, Lee made additional deployments to strengthen the Confederate right flank. Lee would have moved men from Longstreet's force north of the James River but largely due to demonstrations and deceptions by the remaining divisions of Major General Godfrey Weitzel's XXV Corps, Longstreet thought that he still confronted Ord's entire Army of the James almost three days after Ord had gone with the XXIV Corps, a division of the XXV Corps and Mackenzie's cavalry to the Union lines south of Petersburg.

Lee moved Brigadier General Alfred M. Scales's brigade from Major General Cadmus M. Wilcox's division's left to trenches near the junction of the White Oak Road and the Boydton Plank Road. Another of Wilcox's brigades temporarily commanded by Colonel Joseph H. Hyman was moved to the rifle pits south of Burgess Mill. MacRae's brigade moved to the southwest side of Hatcher's Run, having already just moved to Burgess Mill. Brigadier General Eppa Hunton's brigade of Pickett's division joined Anderson and Bushrod Johnson along the White Oak Road Line near the junction with the Claiborne Road. Major General Bryan Grimes's division reinforced Brigadier General Edward L. Thomas's brigade which had to fill in part of the line formerly occupied by Scales's Brigade.

The rain severely hampered the Union Army's mobile force's operations and ability to keep supplies moving. A large number of Warren's V Corps soldiers had to help the teamsters move horses and wagons and even to corduroy roads. Gravelly Run was swollen to three times its usual size and bridges and pontoons on Hatcher's Run were swept away.

Skirmishers from the Union V Corps kept the Confederates in their White Oak Road Line between the Boydton Plank Road and Claiborne Road on March 30. Despite incomplete information and somewhat vague and conflicting orders from Meade and Grant, on Grant's order, Warren pushed the Union V Corps forward to strengthen his hold on a part of the Boydton Plank Road and the V Corps entrenched a line to cover that road from its intersection with Dabney Mill Road south to Gravelly Run. In the afternoon, Warren saw Griffin's men take over Confederate outposts but he also saw that any movement further up the Boydton Plank Road by his men would be covered by Confederate artillery and fortifications.

Brigadier General Romeyn B. Ayres's division of the V Corps made a reconnaissance toward the White Oak Road a short distance west of Claiborne Road. The lead brigade under Colonel Frederick Winthrop crossed a swollen branch of Gravelly Run which was to feature in the following day's battle. Two other brigades did not cross but began to entrench. Winthrop's men saw the movement west of Pickett's brigades and captured a Confederate officer who provided information that was sent to Meade. Ayres saw only empty space to the northeast and failed to see heavy fortifications near the intersection of White Oak Road and Claiborne Road which angled sharply back to Hatcher's Run directly to his north. As dark approached, Ayres had a number of outposts prepared to cover his position, which was along and not beyond the Confederate line.

Meanwhile, Humphrey's II Corps closed the gap between the V Corps and the XXIV Corps. The latter corps captured a large part of the Confederate picket line in their front. Humphrey's II Corp also moved as close to the Confederate line as possible without starting a general engagement and entrenched at the forward positions. Union casualties for the March 30 actions at the White Oak Road Line were 1 killed, 7 wounded and 15 missing; the number of Confederate casualties is unknown.

During the night of March 30, Grant advised Meade not to have the VI Corps and IX Corps make a general attack along the line on March 31 as earlier planned, but to stand ready to take advantage of any sign that the Confederates had weakened their line. Grant also noted that he wanted to shift forces to the west so that Warren would have his whole force available to reinforce Ayres.

=== White Oak Road (March 31) ===
On the morning of March 31, General Lee inspected his White Oak Road Line and learned that the Union left flank held by Brigadier General Romeyn B. Ayres's division was "in the air" and that there was a wide gap between the Union infantry and Sheridan's nearest cavalry units near Dinwiddie Court House. Lee ordered Major General Bushrod Johnson to have his remaining brigades under Brigadier General Henry A. Wise and Colonel Martin L. Stansel in lieu of ill Brigadier General Young Marshall Moody, reinforced by the brigades of Brigadier Generals Samuel McGowan and Eppa Hunton, attack the exposed Union line.

Soon after 10:00 a.m., having seen Ayres's division and a brigade from Brigadier General (Brevet Major General) Samuel W. Crawford's division moving toward the Confederate line in an effort to close the lines as much as possible, Johnson allowed Hunton's and Stansel's brigades to advance to meet the Union formations. The Confederates were able to approach the Union force while screened by woods north of White Oak Road and while out of sight, open fire at close range.

All three Confederate brigades, including McGowan's, attacked both Ayres's division and all of Crawford's division which quickly joined the fight as it erupted. Warren himself had come forward, grabbed a regimental flag and tried unsuccessfully to rally the retreating Union men but had to withdraw under fire. Four Confederate brigades, only three of which saw any real action against V Corps divisions, had thrown back two Union divisions of over 5,000 men.

Brigadier General (Brevet Major General) Charles Griffin's division and the V Corps artillery under Colonel (Brevet Brigadier General) Charles S. Wainwright, which had to carry their four guns forward through the mud, finally stopped the Confederate advance short of crossing Gravelly Run. Adjacent to the V Corps in the line, the II Corps under Major General Andrew A. Humphreys sent two of Brigadier General Nelson Miles's brigades forward and they initially surprised and after a sharp fight drove back Wise's brigade on the left of the Confederate line, taking about 100 prisoners. Humphreys also ordered three diversionary demonstrations along the adjacent line to prevent the Confederates from reinforcing Johnson. Because no reinforcements were available, Johnson pulled his tired men back to the line of fortifications south of White Oak Road that Ayres's men had set up the night before. Miles saw through his field glasses that the Confederate rifle pits west of Boydton Plank Road were unoccupied but because the 5th New Hampshire Regiment's attack was in the wrong place on the line, the Confederates were able to reoccupy the empty trenches.

Griffin's V Corps brigade and Wainwright's artillery stabilized the Union line by 1:00 p.m. Warren and Griffin then approached Brigadier General Joshua Chamberlain, wounded only two days earlier at the Battle of Lewis's Farm, with the question: "General Chamberlain, will you save the honor of the Fifth Corps?" Despite the pain from his wounds suffered at Lewis's Farm, Chamberlain agreed to the assignment. At 2:30 p.m., Chamberlain's men forded the cold, swollen Gravelly Run, followed by the rest of Griffin's division and then the rest of Warren's reorganized units.

From Johnson's new position in rifle pits south of White Oak Road, which had been constructed by Ayres's men, the Confederates hit Chamberlain's men with a heavy fire as they emerged from the nearby woods. Warren ordered Chamberlain to hold his position but Chamberlain suggested to Griffin that they would be better off attacking the Confederates than remaining under fire and being picked off. Griffin approved the proposal and Chamberlain's brigade, along with the brigade commanded by Colonel (Brevet Brigadier General) Edgar M. Gregory, charged Hunton's brigade and drove them back to the White Oak Road Line. Then Chamberlain's and Gregory's men crossed White Oak Road. The remainder of the Confederate force then had to withdraw to prevent being outflanked and overwhelmed.

Warren's men pursued across White Oak Road west of Claiborne Road but after a personal reconnaissance where Warren and a large party of scouts came under fire, Warren concluded that an immediate attack on the Confederate fortifications would gain nothing. Warren's corps ended the battle having gained possession of a part of White Oak Road to the west of the Confederate right flank, which was between the end of the Confederate line and Pickett's force at Five Forks. Ayres's division stopped just short of White Oak Road, facing west toward Five Forks. This cut the direct communication route between Anderson's (Johnson's) and Pickett's forces.

Union casualties (killed, wounded, missing – presumably mostly captured) were 1,407 from the Fifth Corps and 461 from the Second Corps and Confederate casualties have been estimated at 800. (Note: Lowe, David W. White Oak Road in Kennedy, Frances H., ed., The Civil War Battlefield Guide, 2nd ed., Houghton Mifflin Co., 1998, ISBN 978-0-395-74012-5. p. 417. gives the casualties as Union 1,781 and Confederate as 900–1,235.)

=== Dinwiddie Court House (March 31) ===
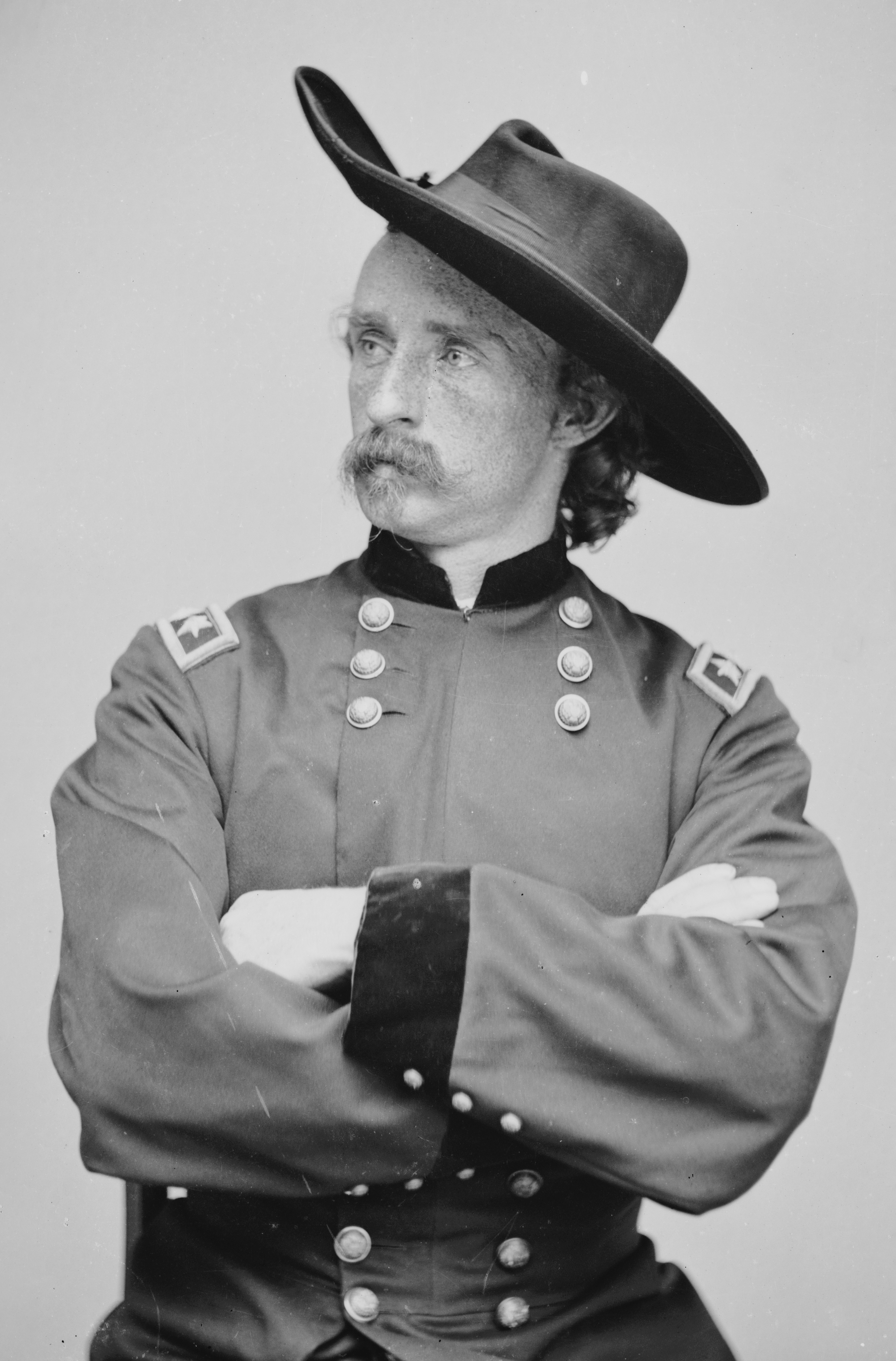
Brigadier General (Brevet Major General) George Armstrong Custer

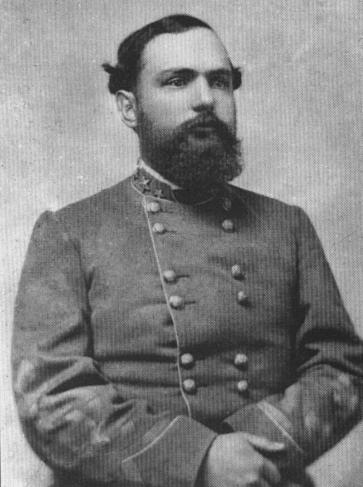
Brigadier General W.H.F. "Rooney" Lee

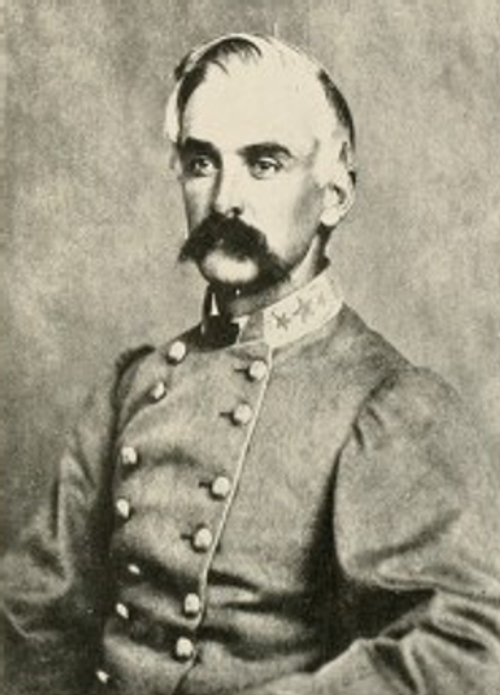
Colonel Thomas T. Munford

About 5:00 p.m. on March 29, 1865, Major General Philip Sheridan led two of his three divisions of Union cavalry, totalling about 9,000 men counting the trailing division, unopposed into Dinwiddie Court House, Virginia, about 4 miles (6.4 km) west of the end of the Confederate lines and about 6 miles (9.7 km) south of the important road junction at Five Forks, Virginia. Sheridan planned to occupy Five Forks the next day. That night, under orders from General Robert E. Lee, Confederate Major General Fitzhugh Lee led his cavalry division from Sutherland Station to Five Forks to defend against an anticipated Union drive to the South Side Railroad in order to cut use of that important final Confederate railroad supply line to Petersburg. Fitzhugh Lee arrived at Five Forks with his division early on the morning of March 30 and headed toward Dinwiddie Court House.

On March 30, 1865, in driving rain, Sheridan sent Union cavalry patrols from Brigadier General Thomas Devin's division to seize Five Forks, key junction for reaching the South Side Railroad. Devin's force unexpectedly found and skirmished with units of Fitzhugh Lee's cavalry division. A patrol of the 6th United States Cavalry Regiment under Major Robert M. Morris lost 3 officers and 20 men in the encounter with Fitzhugh Lee's troopers. Confederates casualties included Brigadier General William H. F. Payne who was wounded.

That night Confederate Major General George Pickett reached Five Forks with about 6,000 infantrymen in five brigades (under Brigadier Generals William R. Terry, Montgomery Dent Corse, George H. Steuart, Matt Whitaker Ransom and William Henry Wallace) and took overall command of the operation as ordered by General Robert E. Lee. General Lee was concerned that detected Union Army movements were aimed at Five Forks and the South Side Railroad. The cavalry divisions of Major Generals Thomas L. Rosser and W.H.F. "Rooney" Lee arrived at Five Forks late that night. Fitzhugh Lee took overall command of the cavalry and put Colonel Thomas T. Munford in command of his own division.

The rain continued on March 31. Under Sheridan's direction, Brigadier General (Brevet Major General) Wesley Merritt sent two of Devin's brigades toward Five Forks and held one brigade in reserve at J. Boisseau's farm. Brigades or detachments from Major General George Crook's division were sent to guard two fords of a swampy stream just to the west, Chamberlain's Bed, in order to protect the Union left flank from surprise attack and to guard the major roads.

While Colonel Munford's division kept Devin's men away from Five Forks, Pickett moved off to the west of Chamberlain's Bed with his infantry and Rooney Lee's and Rosser's cavalry under Fitzhugh Lee to capture the fords and attack Sheridan from the left or rear and disperse his force. Not waiting for the infantry to begin their attack, Lee's troopers attacked Fitzgerald's Ford, the southern ford, and got some troops across. They were driven back by dismounted Union troopers of Colonel (Brevet Brigadier General) Charles H. Smith's brigade armed with Spencer repeating carbines. Coming up as Lee's attack faltered, Pickett reorganized his forces. At about 2:00 p.m., Lee attacked again without success but Pickett's force crossed the northern ford, Danse's Ford. The attack was helped in part by the unnecessary move ordered by General Crook of most of the blocking force of Brigadier General Henry E. Davies's brigade South toward the sound of gunfire presumably to help Smith's brigade, which in fact continued to hold the position.

Union units fought a series of delaying actions throughout the day. After the Confederate infantry and cavalry had crossed Danse's ford and later the cavalry had crossed Fitzgerald's Ford, Munford's division drove back Colonel Charles L. Fitzhugh's and Colonel Peter Stagg's brigades of Devin's division. Munford drove the two Union brigades who were trying to move to Five Forks back to J. Boisseau's farm while Pickett drove Brigadier General Davies's brigade off the main roads and back to that farm. The three brigades became separated from the rest of the Union force by a cross country move by Pickett to block the road to the south. As the three brigades were being pressed back to J. Boisseau's farm, Devin's third brigade under Brigadier General Alfred Gibbs moved quickly up from Dinwiddie Court House to hold the junction of Adams Road and Brooks Road. Sheridan ordered Colonel (Brevet Brigadier General) John I. Gregg's brigade which had also moved in support of Smith but had remained behind the combat at Fitzgerald's Ford move cross country angling a little northeast to Adams Road to stop the Confederate advance. When Gregg's brigade reached Adam's Road, they joined with Gibb's brigade in defense of the junction.

After pushing the three brigades to J. Boisseau's farm, the Confederates turned south to attack Gibbs's and Gregg's brigades, later joined by Colonel Smith's brigade. Smith's brigade finally had to withdraw from Fitzgerald's Ford when Confederate pressure was threatening to overrun them and Pickett's advancing infantry threatened to cut them off from other Union units. Davies, Fitzhugh and Stagg brought their men back to Dinwiddie Court House about dark by a circuitous route cross country and by the Boydton Plank Road.

By the time Pickett pushed back Gibbs's, Gregg's and Smith's brigades from the junction of Adams Road and Brooks Road, Sheridan had called up two of the brigades of Brigadier General (Brevet Major General) George Armstrong Custer's division under Colonels Alexander C. M. Pennington, Jr. and Henry Capehart. Custer set up another defensive line about 0.75 miles (1.21 km) north of Dinwiddie Court House. Custer's brigades, joined by Smith's and Gibbs's brigades, held off the attack by Pickett and Fitzhugh Lee until darkness ended the battle. Both armies stayed in position and close to each other after dark. The Confederates intended to resume the attack in the morning.

The Confederates did not report their casualties and losses. Historian A. Wilson Greene has written that the best estimate of Confederate casualties in the Dinwiddie Court House engagement is 360 cavalry, 400 infantry, 760 total killed and wounded. Union officers' reports showed that some Confederates also were taken prisoner. Sheridan suffered 40 killed, 254 wounded, 60 missing, total 354. (Note: Bearss, 2014, p. 404 states the Union loss was about 450 according to the Official Records of the War of the Rebellion. Longacre, 2003, p. 75 says Sheridan took "nearly 500" casualties.) Pickett lost Brigadier General William R. Terry to a disabling injury. Terry was replaced as brigade commander by Colonel Robert M. Mayo.

Early that night, Union V Corps commander Major General Gouverneur K. Warren recognized from the sound of battle that Sheridan was being pushed back and sent Brigadier General Joseph J. Bartlett's brigade to reinforce Sheridan. When Pickett became aware that Union infantry were arriving near his flank, he withdrew to his modest earthworks at Five Forks. After a night of confused orders and weather-related delays, Warren's three divisions joined Sheridan near Dinwiddie Court House between dawn and 9:00 a.m. Sheridan had been misinformed about the speed with which Warren could move his corps and later held the supposed delayed arrival against Warren. General Grant officially transferred Warren's Corps to Sheridan's command at 6:00 a.m. After Pickett's withdrawal, Sheridan planned to attack the Confederates at Five Forks as soon as possible.

=== Five Forks (April 1) ===
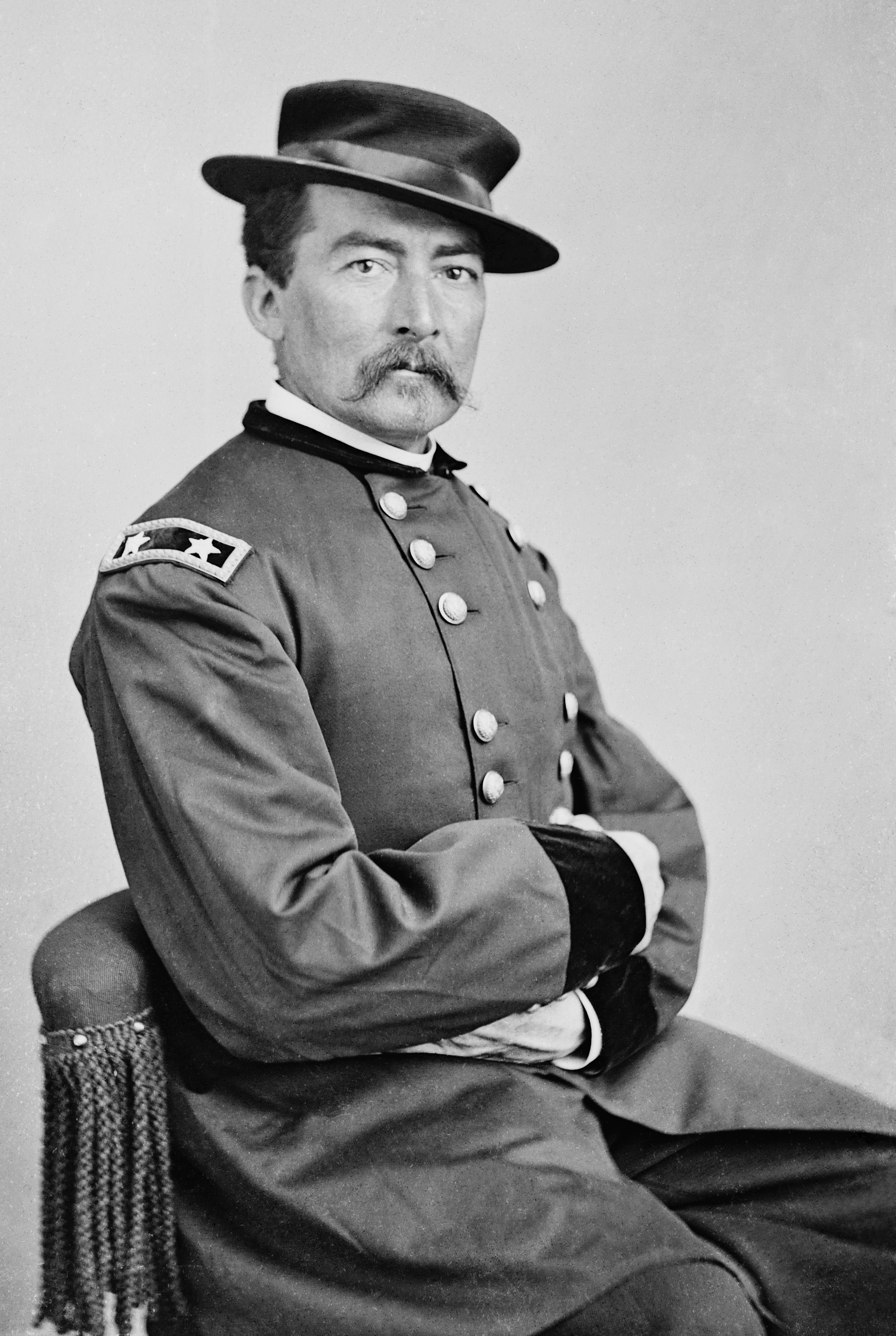
Major General Philip Sheridan

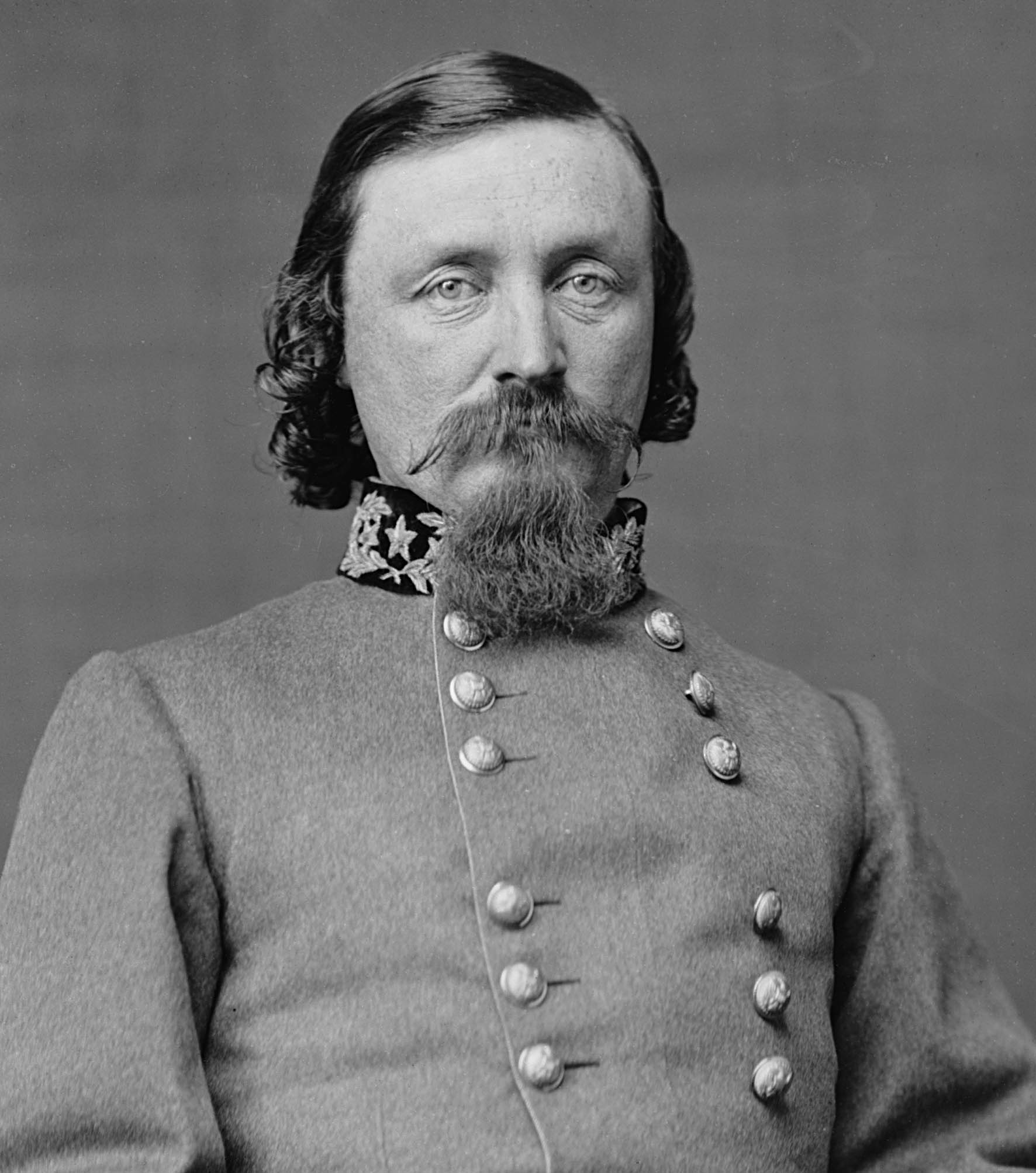
Major General George Pickett

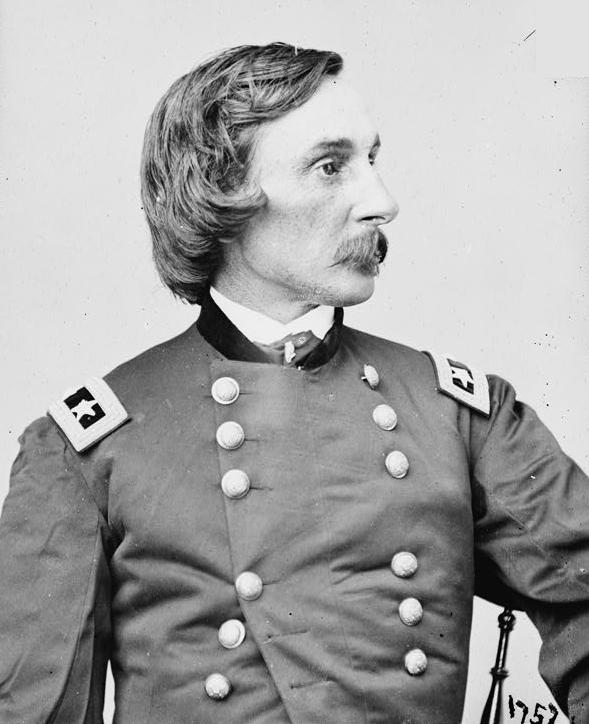
Major General Gouverneur K. Warren

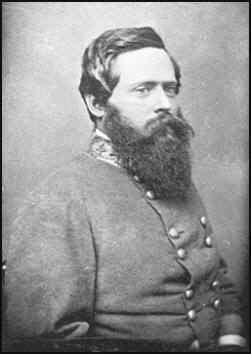
Major General Fitzhugh Lee

The decisive Battle of Five Forks was fought on April 1, 1865, southwest of Petersburg, Virginia, around the road junction of Five Forks in Dinwiddie County, Virginia. Five Forks was a critical crossroads that led to the remaining Confederate supply lines. Mobile task forces of combined infantry, artillery and cavalry from the Union Army commanded by Major General Philip Sheridan and V Corps commander Major General Gouverneur K. Warren defeated a Confederate Army of Northern Virginia combined task force commanded by Major General George E. Pickett and cavalry corps commander Fitzhugh Lee. The Union Army inflicted over 1,000 casualties on the Confederates and took at least 2,400 prisoners while seizing Five Forks, the key to control of the vital South Side Railroad. Union casualties were 103 killed, 670 wounded, 57 missing for a total of 830.

Because of the approach of V Corp infantry on the night of March 31, Pickett retreated about 6 miles (9.7 km) to a modestly fortified line about 1.75 miles (2.82 km) in length approximately half on either side of the junction of White Oak Road, Scott Road and Dinwiddie Court House Road (Ford's Road to the north) at Five Forks. Because of its strategic importance, General Robert E. Lee ordered Pickett to hold Five Forks at all hazards.

At Five Forks at the beginning of the Union attack about 1:00 p.m. on April 1, Sheridan's cavalry hit the front and right flank of the Confederate line with small arms fire from mostly dismounted cavalry troopers of Brigadier General Thomas Devin's and Brigadier General (Brevet Major General) George Armstrong Custer's divisions. They attacked from mostly positions sheltered by woods just outside the Confederate breastworks. This fire pinned down the Confederates while the massed V Corps of infantry organized to attack the Confederate left flank.

With Sheridan fretting about the amount of remaining daylight and his cavalry possibly running out of ammunition, the Union infantry forces attacked about 4:15 p.m. Pickett and Fitzhugh Lee were having a late shad bake lunch about 1.5 miles (2.4 km) north of the main Confederate line along White Oak Road because they thought Sheridan was unlikely to be organized for an attack that late in the day and that General Lee would send reinforcements if Union Army infantry moved against them. The intervening thick, damp woods and an acoustic shadow prevented them from hearing the opening stage of the battle nearby. Pickett and Lee had not told any of the next ranking officers of their absence and that those subordinates were temporarily in charge. By the time Pickett got to the battlefield, his lines were collapsing beyond his ability to reorganize them.

Because of bad information and lack of reconnaissance, two of the Union divisions in the infantry attack did not hit the Confederate left flank, but their movement by chance helped them to roll up the Confederate line by coming at it from the end and rear. The first division in the attack under Brigadier General Romeyn B. Ayres alone overran the short right angled line on the left side of the Confederate main line. Sheridan's personal leadership helped encourage the men and focus them on their objective. Brigadier General Charles Griffin's division recovered from overshooting the Confederate left and helped roll up additional improvised Confederate defense lines. Brigadier General (Brevet Major General) Samuel W. Crawford's division swept across north of the main battle but then closed off Ford's Church Road, swept down to Five Forks and helped disperse the last line of Confederate infantry resistance. The Union cavalry was somewhat less successful. Although they pushed the Confederate cavalry back, most escaped while most of the Confederate infantry became casualties or prisoners.

Due to more apparent than real lack of speed, enthusiasm and leadership, as well as some past grudges and a personality conflict, after Warren had just personally led a final heroic charge to end the battle, Sheridan unfairly relieved Warren of command of V Corps when the successful battle concluded. (Note: In 1883, the Warren Court of Inquiry decided that Sheridan had the authority to relieve Warren but should not have done so under the circumstances.) The Union Army held Five Forks and the road to the South Side Railroad at the end of the battle.

As soon as Grant learned of the victory, at about 8:00 p.m., he ordered Meade to have Humphreys and Parke ready to push ahead to keep Confederates from escaping from Petersburg and converging on Sheridan. Grant told the officers at his headquarters that he had ordered a general assault along the lines. Grant also directed that Wright, Parke and Ord begin an artillery barrage on the Confederate lines. Those division commanders and Ord reported to Grant that their men could not see well enough to attack at night, deferring the general assault until about 40 minutes after its originally planned start time of 4:00 a.m.

After the battle on the night of April 1, Fitzhugh Lee informed Robert E. Lee of the defeat and rout at Five Forks from Church's Crossing near the Ford Church's Road junction with the South Side Railroad where the remaining forces of Rooney Lee and Thomas Rosser joined him. The survivors of the Confederate infantry brigades moved north through the woods and fields to ford Hatcher's Run and move over the W. Dabney road to a position near the South Side Railroad. Lee sent Lieutenant General Richard H. Anderson with his infantry to help Pickett reorganize and hold the South Side Railroad.

=== Breakthrough at Petersburg (April 2) ===
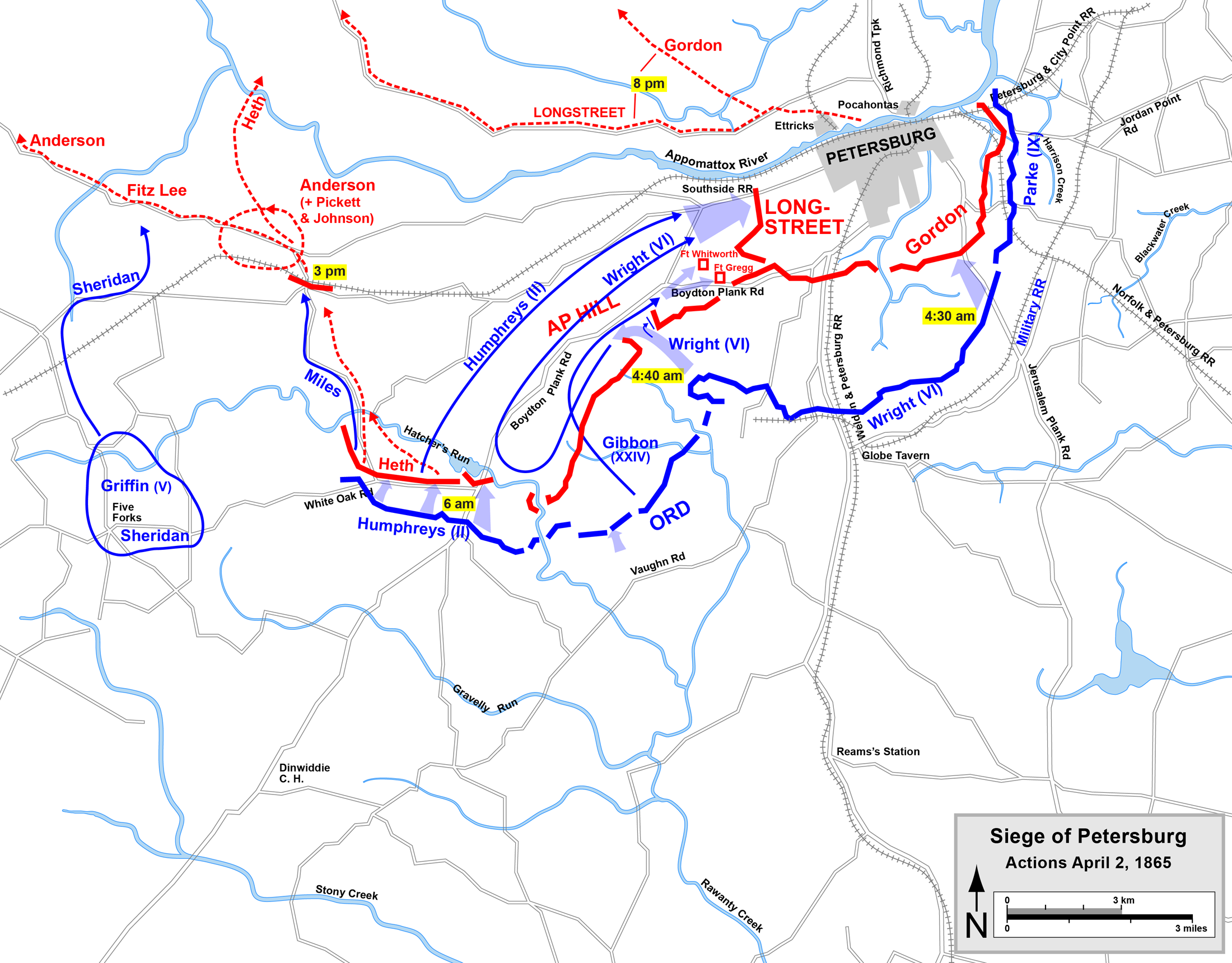
Grant's assault on the Petersburg line and the start of Lee's retreat.

==== Sixth Corps breakthrough ====
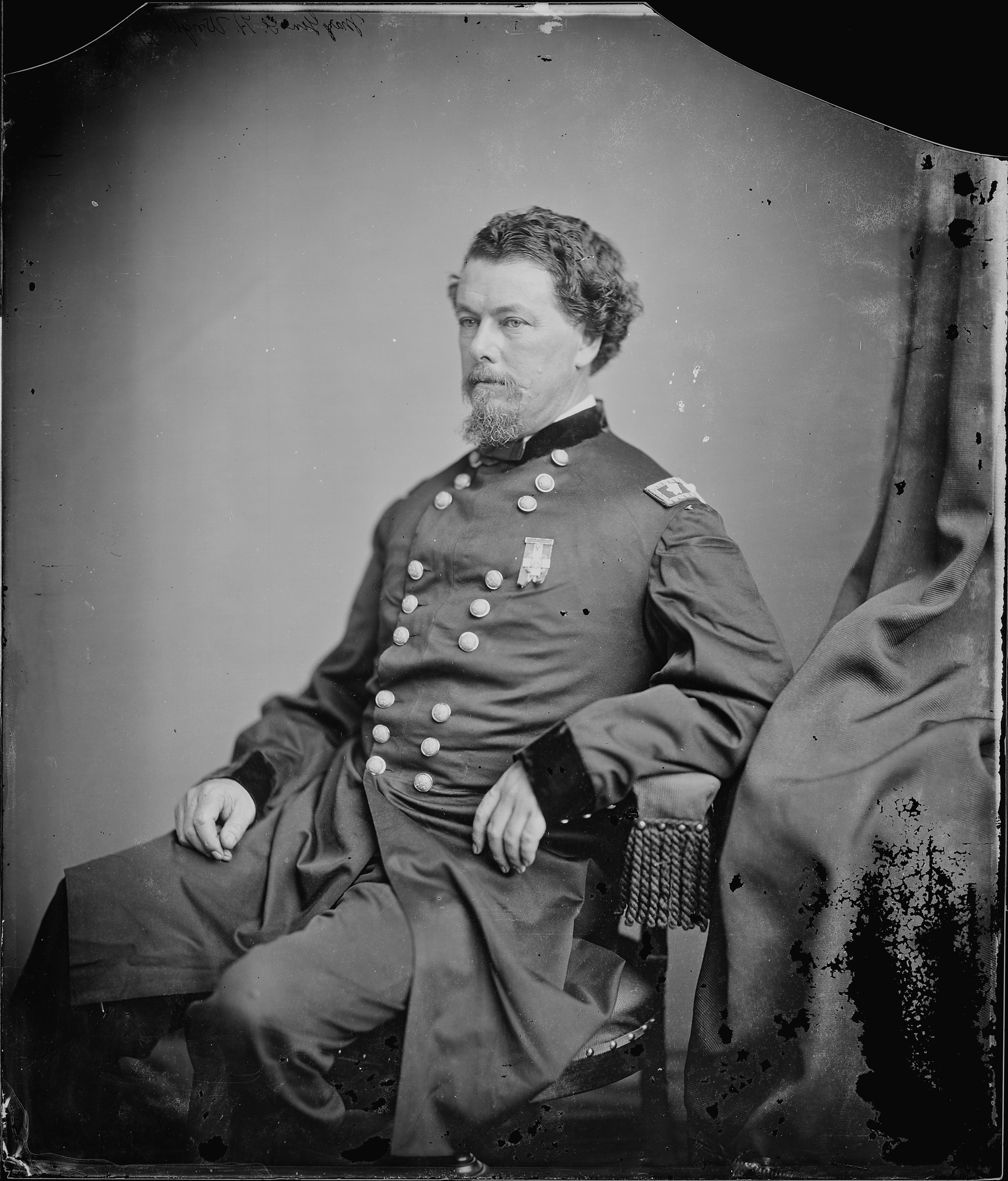
Major General Horatio G. Wright

As ordered by General Grant, at 10:00 p.m., Union artillery opened fire with 150 guns on the Confederate lines opposite the Union Army's Petersburg lines until 2:00 a.m. After careful planning, VI Corps commander Major General Horatio G. Wright had chosen to attack the Confederate line from the Jones house to the left end of his line opposite Union Forts Fisher and Welch. The land between the lines of the two armies was clear of trees and had few natural obstacles except for some marshes near the left end of Wright's line. To the right of the point of attack were inundated areas and strong defenses. The Confederates had batteries sited every few hundred yards along their line. The capture of the Confederate picket line during the Battle of Jones's Farm on March 25, 1865, put the VI Corps close enough to the main Confederate line, with a covered approach to within 2,500 yards (2,300 m) of the defenses, for the attack to succeed. Wright had about 14,000 troops to attack about 2,800 defenders over about 1 mile (1.6 km) of line.

Forming for mass attack just behind the Union picket line, Wright's entire corps was placed in a wedge formation about 1 mile (1.6 km) wide. Brigadier General (Brevet Major General) George W. Getty's Second Division was in the middle front and in advance of the other two brigades for the assault while Brigadier General (Brevet Major General) Frank Wheaton's First Division was on the right rear and Brigadier General Truman Seymour's Third Division was on the left rear. The Union attackers assembled in the dark only about 200 yards (180 m) from the Confederate picket line and 600 yards (550 m) from the Confederate main line and had to lie on their arms on the cold ground for nearly four hours. Some Confederate defenders were alerted by the activity and began to fire randomly into the Union assembly area. The Union force took some casualties, including Brigadier General Lewis Grant of the 1st Vermont Brigade who suffered a severe head wound and had to relinquish command to Lieutenant Colonel Amasa S. Tracy.

The 1st Vermont Brigade led the assault at 4:40 a.m. after the firing of a signal gun from Fort Fisher. The Confederate line in front of the attackers was defended by Brigadier General James H. Lane's North Carolina brigade, with sharpshooters from Brigadier General Samuel McGowan's South Carolina brigade manning the picket line. (Note: On Lane's left was Brigadier General Edward L. Thomas's Georgia brigade and part of Brigadier General William MacRae's North Carolina brigade was on his right. Hess, 2009, p. 272.) The Confederate picket line was overwhelmed quickly by the Union attackers. The first Union soldier over the Confederate defenses was Captain Charles G. Gould of the 5th Vermont Infantry Regiment of the Vermont Brigade of Getty's division, who moved to the left of the main body through the ravine, down the Confederate picket path and over the plank bridge with three other men. (Note: Brigade commander Lieutenant Colonel J. Warren Keifer of Major General Truman Seymour's Division stated in a report six weeks after the breakthrough that Sergeant John E. Buffington of the 6th Maryland Infantry Regiment was the first man from the brigade over the works. Seymour claimed that Keifer's men were the first into the Confederate line, although he later only said that Buffington was the first man over the works from his division. Buffington was awarded the Medal of Honor in 1908. Greene, 2008, pp. 249–250.) Gould suffered three severe bayonet and sword wounds, including two to his head, but he survived his wounds. (Note: Gould and Color-Bearer Sergeant Jackson Sargent who planted the state colors on the parapet later received the Medal of Honor. Greene, 2008, pp. 220.) Soon thereafter Colonel Thomas W. Hyde's brigade and Colonel (Brevet Brigadier General) James M. Warner's brigade overcame the defenders in their front, putting half of Lane's brigade out of action.

Wheaton's division, led by Colonel (Brevet Brigadier General) Oliver Edwards's brigade, captured a sector of the line next to Warner's brigade. Lieutenant Colonel Elisha Hunt Rhodes led his 2nd Rhode Island Volunteer Infantry Regiment on a flanking maneuver where he could the main Confederate line into a ditch for some protection. The Union soldiers quickly climbed up the exterior slope to the top of the earthworks before the Confederates could reload and fire, causing the Confederates to retreat. After, Colonel William Penrose's New Jersey brigade initially was held back by more determined Confederate pickets and gathered in the moat in front of the Confederate earthworks and stormed over the barrier to subdue the North Carolina defenders in their front. Colonel (Brevet Brigadier General) Joseph Hamblin's brigade had the longest distance to cross before reaching the Confederate line, held at that point by Brigadier General Edward L. Thomas's Georgia brigade. The attack was covered by sharpshooters led by Captain James T. Stuart from the 49th Pennsylvania Infantry Regiment, who were armed with Spencer repeating rifles. Without having to engage in hand-to-hand combat, Hamblin's brigade overcame the defenders, many of whom already were retreating from flank fire from adjacent Union soldiers. Wright left Hamblin's brigade to guard the captured line at its north end as he reorganized most of the remaining men of the corps to move south.

On the left of the Sixth Corps' formation, Major General Truman Seymour's division, led by Lieutenant Colonel J. Warren Keifer's brigade, dispersed MacRae's North Carolina brigade. Keifer's regiments quickly drove off the 28th North Carolina Infantry Regiment, captured 10 pieces of artillery, a large number of prisoners, three battle flags and Major General Henry Heth's headquarters flag. Colonel William S. Truex led the rest of Seymour's division against two North Carolina regiments and a six-gun artillery battery on the far left of the VI Corps assault. The Confederates held their fire when their own pickets began to flee toward the main line in front of the advancing Union soldiers, who overwhelmed the main Confederate line.

After about 30 minutes of heavy fighting, the Confederate lines had been broken and Humphrey's VI Corps had made a decisive breakthrough. As the VI Corps surged forward, some soldiers ultimately crossed the Boydton Plank Road and reached the South Side Railroad about 1 mile (1.6 km) away.

Union Army Chief Engineer John G. Barnard estimated Union casualties in the VI Corps breakthrough at about 1,100 killed and wounded, "all of which occurred in the space of about fifteen minutes." Confederate casualties are unknown but the majority of them were taken prisoner rather than killed or wounded. General Grant estimated the VI Corps took about 3,000 prisoners, which historian A. Wilson Greene states is "probably not far wrong."

==== A.P. Hill killed ====
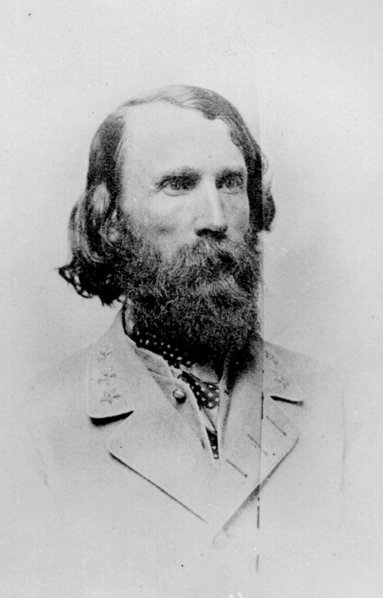
Lieutenant General A.P. Hill

A.P. Hill and Robert E. Lee both learned of the breakthrough soon after it occurred. At about 5:30 a.m. Hill rode to meet with Lee, then set out to organize the defense along the Boydton Plank Road Line. After the initial breakthrough, stragglers from Wright's corps continued straight forward while most of the VI Corps troops turned to the left. West of the Boydton Plank Road, two stragglers from the 138th Pennsylvania Infantry Regiment, Corporal John W. Mauk and Private Daniel Wolford, stumbled upon Confederate Lieutenant General A. P. Hill and an aide, Sergeant George W. Tucker, as they rode through woods parallel to the Boydton Plank Road trying to reach Major General Henry Heth's headquarters near the front line. Hill demanded their surrender, but the Union soldiers took aim, fired and killed him. Tucker escaped and rode back to Lee to report Hill's death.

==== VI Corps, XXIV Corps moves ====
Major General John Gibbon's XXIV Corps of the Army of the James was unable to extend the breakthrough by assaulting the main Confederate line southeast across the Boydton Plank Road, to the left of the VI Corps, because the ground was too broken and marshy to cross so Major General Edward C. Ord sent all of Brigadier General Robert S. Foster's division and most of two brigades from Brigadier General John W. Turner's division of the XXIV Corps to follow Wright's corps. Brigadier General Thomas M. Harris's brigade of Turner's division captured a section of the Confederate line southwest of Wright's breakthrough after the defenders had evacuated.

After the breakthrough, Wright and his officers brought some order to seven brigades and turned this large part of his corps to the left to deal with the troops of Major General Henry Heth's division still holding the Confederate line to the southwest with about 1,600 men. The VI Corps attackers rolled past Confederate Brigadier General William McComb's brigade and captured Confederate Fort Davis, lost it to McComb's counterattack about 20 minutes later and then recaptured it a short time later. By 7:45 a.m., Heth and the remaining men of his division, with only Brigadier General John R. Cooke's brigade mostly intact, were withdrawing toward Sutherland's Station.

The XXIV Corps had followed the VI Corps' advance and by 9:00 a.m., Wright met Ord and Gibbon in the Confederate works. They decided that since the Confederate defense had collapsed in this area, they would turn their combined force toward the city. By about 10:00 a.m., Ord and Wright were moving 15,000 men in a line facing northeast, with Ord on the right and Wright on the left as they advanced on the city with the idea of attempting to break the western defenses of Petersburg.

==== Battle of Forts Gregg and Whitworth ====
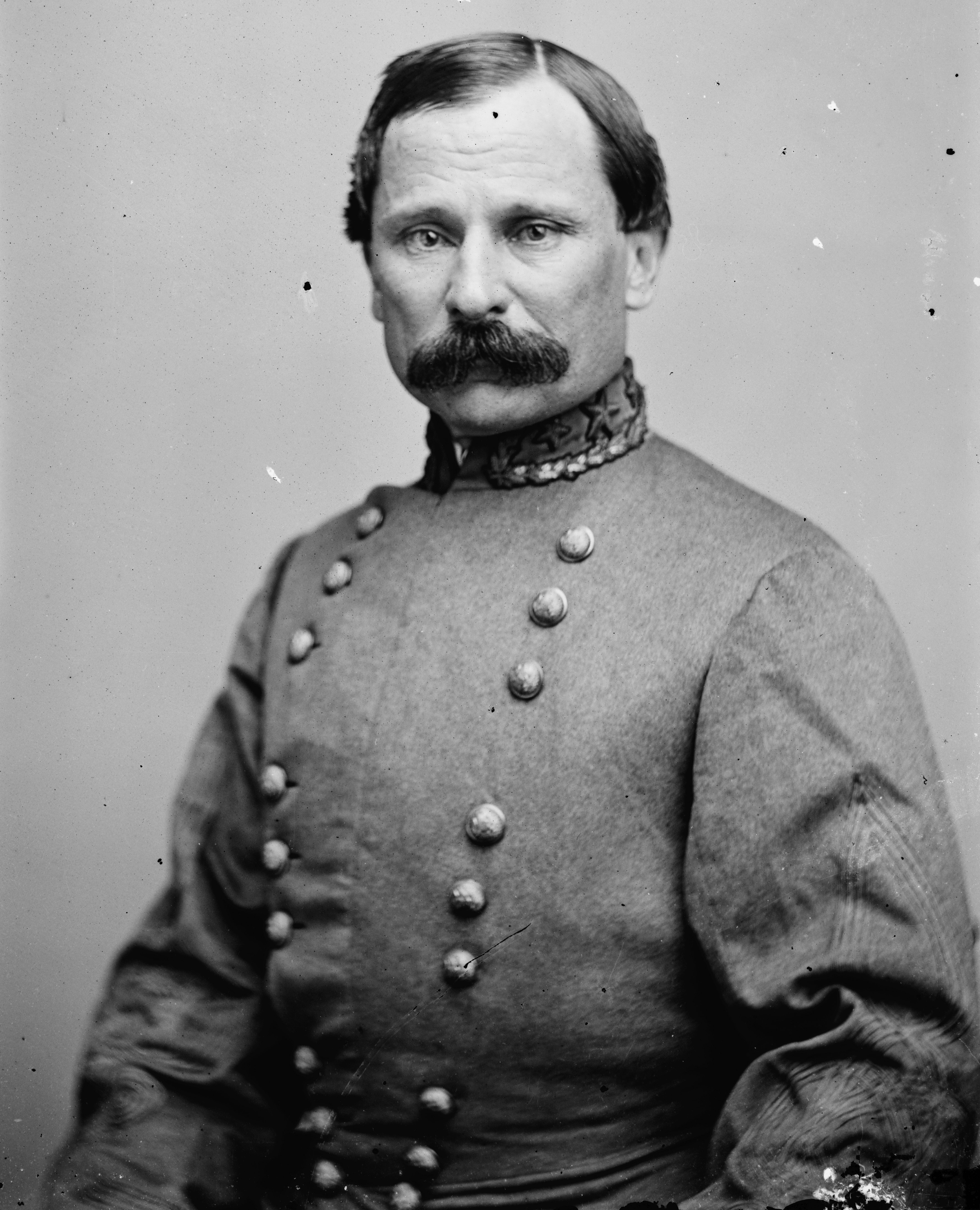
Major General Cadmus Wilcox

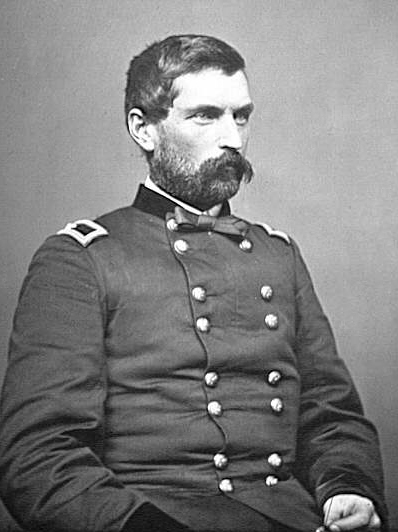
Major General John Gibbon

Confederates from Brigadier General William R. Cox's Brigade of Major General Bryan Grimes's Division of the Second Corps held the Confederate line to the east of the broken Confederate main line. When Brigadier General Lane withdrew his remaining men from his position along the Confederate main line, he met Major General Cadmus Wilcox near Fort Gregg. Wilcox insisted on attempting to reclaim the Confederate lines or at least to block a further breakthrough. Near Fort Gregg, Wilcox and Lane assembled about 600 fugitives of Lane's and Thomas's brigades and attacked about 80 men of Colonel Joseph Hamblin's brigade who were holding the end of the captured line. The Union soldiers withdrew in the face of this large force, leaving two captured guns behind. Lane's men then formed a line facing west along Church Road perpendicular to the old line. This minor advance, which lasted less than an hour, still left over 4 miles (6.4 km) of the Confederate line in the Union Army's possession.

The defenders from Lane's and Thomas's brigades in the newly formed line and four regiments of 400 veterans of newly arrived Brigadier General Nathaniel Harris's Mississippi Brigade which had moved 400 yards (370 m) in front of the forts retreated toward Forts Gregg and Whitworth when Gibbon's XXIV Corps advanced. Union Colonel (Brevet Brigadier General) Thomas O. Osborn recaptured the temporarily lost section of line and two cannons without loss of life.

Brigadier General Lane and Major General Wilcox then stationed the Mississippi Brigade and some of Lane's and Thomas's men in Fort Gregg and Fort Whitworth along the Boydton Plank Road Line. (Note: The forts were northwest of the Boydton Plank Road, about 1,000 yards (910 m) in front of the Dimmock Line. Hess, 2009, p. 273–275.Greene, 2008, p. 285 locates the forts about 1 mile (1.6 km) west of the Dimmock Line on the north side of the Boydton Plank Road.) Two hundred men of the 12th Mississippi Infantry Regiment and 16th Mississippi Infantry Regiment under Lieutenant Colonel James H. Duncan of the 19th Mississippi Infantry Regiment along with artillerymen and a few troops from Lane's brigade, for a total of about 350 men, held Fort Gregg. Nathaniel Harris personally commanded the 19th Mississippi Infantry Regiment and the 48th Mississippi Infantry Regiment and a few artillerymen, totaling about 200 men, in Fort Whitworth.

Led by the brigade of Colonel (Brevet Brigadier General) Thomas O. Osborn and two regiments of the brigade of Colonel George B. Dandy of Brigadier General Robert S. Foster's division, the Union force charged Fort Gregg which was surrounded by a ditch partially filled with water. After crossing a field of deadly fire, many of the attackers ran into the ditch only to be mired in water and mud. Soldiers of the 67th Ohio Infantry Regiment reached the ditch first but could not work their way around to the rear entrance due to the depth of the water. With the attack stalled, Brigadier General Foster sent two of Colonel Harrison S. Fairchild's regiments forward and Brigadier General John W. Turner's Independent Division's (Second Division's) First Brigade under Lieutenant Colonel Andrew Potter and Second Brigade under Colonel William B. Curtis pushed up, merely for them also to get stuck in the mud and water in the ditch. The great majority of soldiers of 14 regiments reached the ditch in front of the fort where the attack temporarily halted. A total force of 4,000 men had attacked Fort Gregg, struggling for up to a half-hour to gain entry as the defenders threw "dirt, stones and various kinds of missiles," including rolled artillery shells, across the parapet onto their heads and killed or wounded many of the first attackers as they came to the top of the parapet.

Eventually, Union soldiers found the uncompleted short trench in back of the fort which allowed them an easier opportunity to climb onto the fort's parapet. The mass of men in the ditch had to move or be killed so they started to scale the walls or rushed around the moat to find the unfinished trench or sally port in the rear. Attackers were able to gain entry to the fort from the rear at the same time that a large number of Union troops finally managed to gain the top of the parapet. Soldiers of the 12th West Virginia Infantry Regiment were reported to be the first to cross into the fort after their flag had been planted at the top of the wall. (Note: Corporal and Color-Bearer John Kane of the 100th New York Infantry was awarded the Medal of Honor for his gallantry in the attack by posting the national flag on the wall of Fort Gregg. Fox, III, John J. The Confederate Alamo: Bloodbath at Petersburg's Fort Gregg on April 2, 1865. Winchester VA: Angle Valley Press, 2010. ISBN 978-0-9711950-0-4. p. 122.) After several bayonet charges, the Union attackers finally carried the works by sheer force of numbers and, after desperate hand-to-hand combat, forced the surviving defenders to surrender.

As the assault on Fort Gregg concluded, Turner's Third Brigade under Brigadier General Thomas M. Harris attacked Fort Whitworth, where Confederate Brigadier General Nathaniel Harris was in command. Fort Whitworth fell soon after Fort Gregg was taken as it was then being evacuated, with only about 70 defenders remaining to be captured.

Major General Gibbon reported that 55 Confederates were killed at Fort Gregg and about 300 captured, many of them wounded, along with two guns and several flags. (Note: Hess, 2009, p. 276 puts the Confederate casualties at 56 dead and 250 taken prisoner at Fort Gregg with 70 more taken prisoner at Fort Whitworth. Calkins, 2002, p. 50 gives the number of killed as 57, with 129 wounded and 30 taken prisoner.) Gibbon's XXIV Corps's loss for the day, mostly at the two forts, was 122 killed, 592 wounded, for a total of 714. The entire attack on Fort Gregg took about two hours but bought some valuable time which allowed Major General Charles W. Field's division of Longstreet's corps, two brigades from Gordon's corps and some of General Wilcox's men to occupy the Dimmock Line defenses.

==== VI Corps drives back artillery ====
When the VI Corps advanced to Gibbon's left at the start of the attack on Fort Gregg, only Confederate artillery fire from Lieutenant Colonel William T. Poague's Battery, directed by Confederate staff officer Giles Buckner Cooke, opposed them. The battery was operating from a position next to Lee's command post at the Turnbull House, also known as Edge Hill, located west of Rohoic Creek in front of the Dimmock Line. Getty's division had moved near the Turnbull House with limited protection from Poague's artillery. Getty determined to attack the 13 guns that were turned against his division from that location.

Getty's first attack was turned back but Colonel Hyde's men successfully outflanked the batteries, leading to the withdrawal of the gunners and the 9 guns that had not been immobilized. Field's division occupied the Dimmock Line as the Confederate artillerists fled the Turnbull House, while General Lee also rode from the Turnbull House to the protection of the Dimmock Line as VI Corps infantrymen approached close enough to see him leave. After dealing with more artillery fire from across the Appomattox River, General Grant ordered the exhausted VI Corps troops to halt and rest, which they did after completing some fortifications near the Turnbull House.

==== Parke's attack on Fort Mahone ====
The Union Army's IX Corps under Major General John G. Parke occupied the original trenches east of Petersburg that were captured in June 1864. Facing Parke was a strong Confederate position along the Jerusalem Plank Road dominated by Fort Mahone (strengthened from the former Battery 29 and named after Major General William Mahone; also known as "Fort Damnation"), covered by batteries in six redoubts and manned by the forces of Major General John B. Gordon. The Confederates had built a strong secondary line about 0.25 miles (0.40 km) behind their main line. Union Fort Sedgwick was about 500 yards (460 m) from Fort Mahone.

On the night of April 1, 1865, at 11:00 p.m., Parke sent men from Brigadier General Simon G. Griffin's brigade of Brigadier General (Brevet Major General) Robert B. Potter's division forward from a point near Fort Sedgwick (also known as "Fort Hell") to take Grimes's picket line. They captured 249 officers and men, about half of Colonel Edwin L. Hobson's brigade in the process. Parke was concerned about trying to assault these works and asked that the offensive be cancelled since the element of surprise had been lost, but his request remained unanswered.

When Parke did not receive a favorable reply to his request for cancellation of the assault, he prepared to send 18 regiments forward. Brigadier General Robert B. Potter's division was to the west of the Jerusalem Plank Road. Brigadier General (Brevet Major General) John F. Hartranft's division, covered by three regiments of Brigadier General (Brevet Major General) Orlando B. Willcox's division, was to the east on the right of Fort Sedgwick. Parke's attackers moved forward into a mist at about 4:00 a.m. Thomas P. Beals, with three companies of the 31st Maine Infantry Regiment, led the attack of Potter's division on Battery No. 28 and under artillery fire from the secondary Confederate line, moved along the main line toward Fort Mahone. Hartranft's division had similar success taking Battery No. 27. Harriman's three regiments from Willcox's division took five guns and 68 prisoners at Battery No. 25. The Union attackers captured Miller's salient but then had to fight Confederate defenders from traverse to traverse along the trenches.

Colonel Edwin A. Nash's troops of Brigadier General Philip Cook's Georgia Brigade held their ground east of the Jerusalem Plank Road, but Potter's soldiers widened the Union foothold west of Jerusalem Plank Road by attacking Fort Mahone. Union Colonel (Brevet Brigadier General) John I. Curtin's brigade assaulted the fort from the rear as well as across the ditch and over the parapet, capturing three guns and several prisoners but they could not advance due to flanking artillery fire. The attack then bogged down after Parke's corps had taken four batteries, including Fort Mahone, and only about 500 yards (460 m) of the Confederate forward line. Confederate counterattacks led to bitter fighting, traverse to traverse, as the afternoon continued. Brigadier General Simon G. Griffin soon relieved the wounded Potter in division command. Major General Bryan Grimes's Confederates counterattacked at 1:00 p.m. and 3:00 p.m., which recaptured a portion of Fort Mahone and sections of Union-occupied trenches east of Jerusalem Plank Road. Union Colonel (Brevet Brigadier General) Charles H. T. Collis's Independent Brigade then attacked to stabilize the situation for the Union troops and to reoccupy the line east of Fort Mahone.

The Union force lost 1,500 men in these assaults. (Note: Greene 2008, p 339 states that Hartranft lost 594 men, Harriman lost 184 and Potter (Griffin) 722.) Confederate casualties are unknown, although General Humphreys reported that Parke claimed 800 prisoners, 12 guns and some flags were captured along with the Confederate works. A Confederate staff officer told Major General Gordon later in the afternoon that the army would likely evacuate Petersburg that night, ending any possibility of a further counterattack on Parke's position. In accordance with Lee's evacuation timetable, Gordon began to remove his men from the trenches at 9:00 p.m.

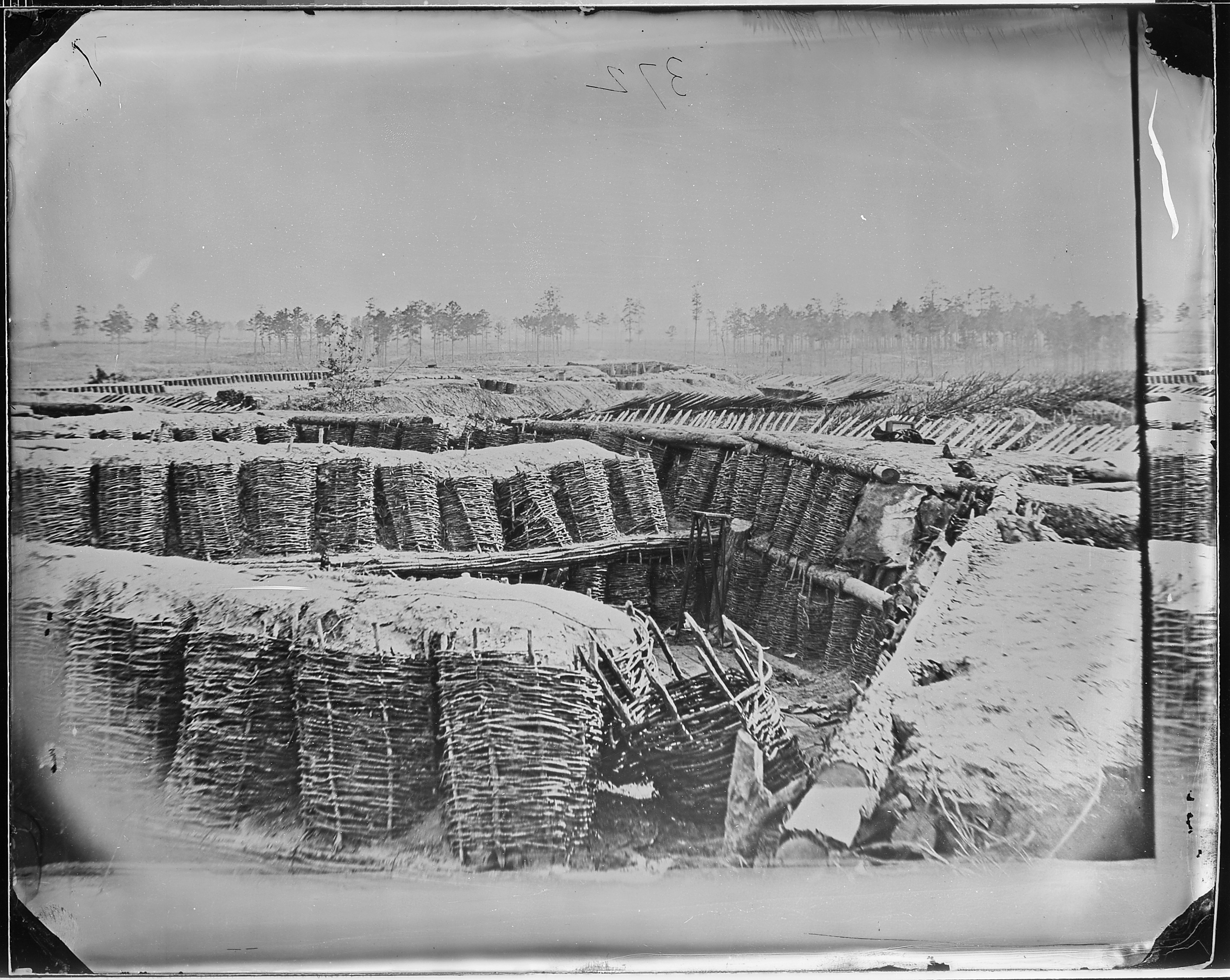
Fascine Trench Breastworks, Petersburg, Va. – NARA – 524792. Although identified as Confederate Trenches this is actually Union Fort Sedgwick aka "Fort Hell" which was opposite Fort Mahone aka "Fort Damnation"

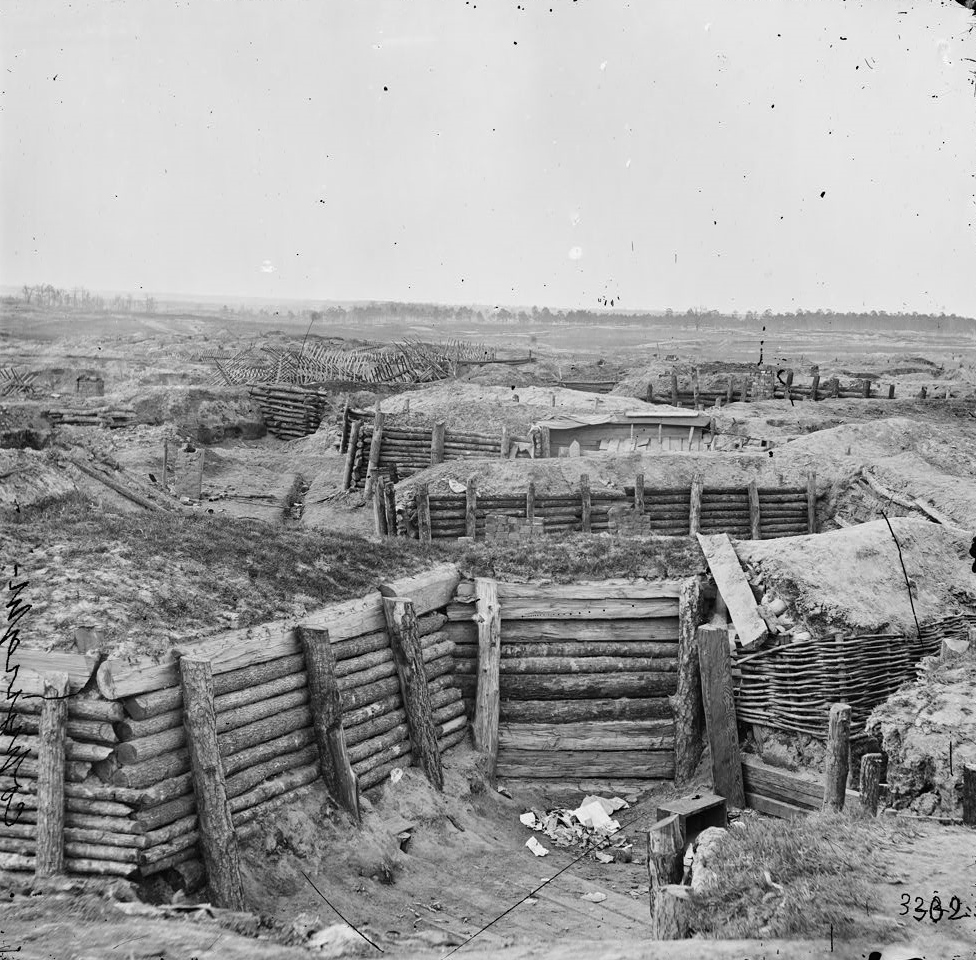
Confederate defenses at Petersburg, Virginia, 1865 showing the site of "Fort Mahone"

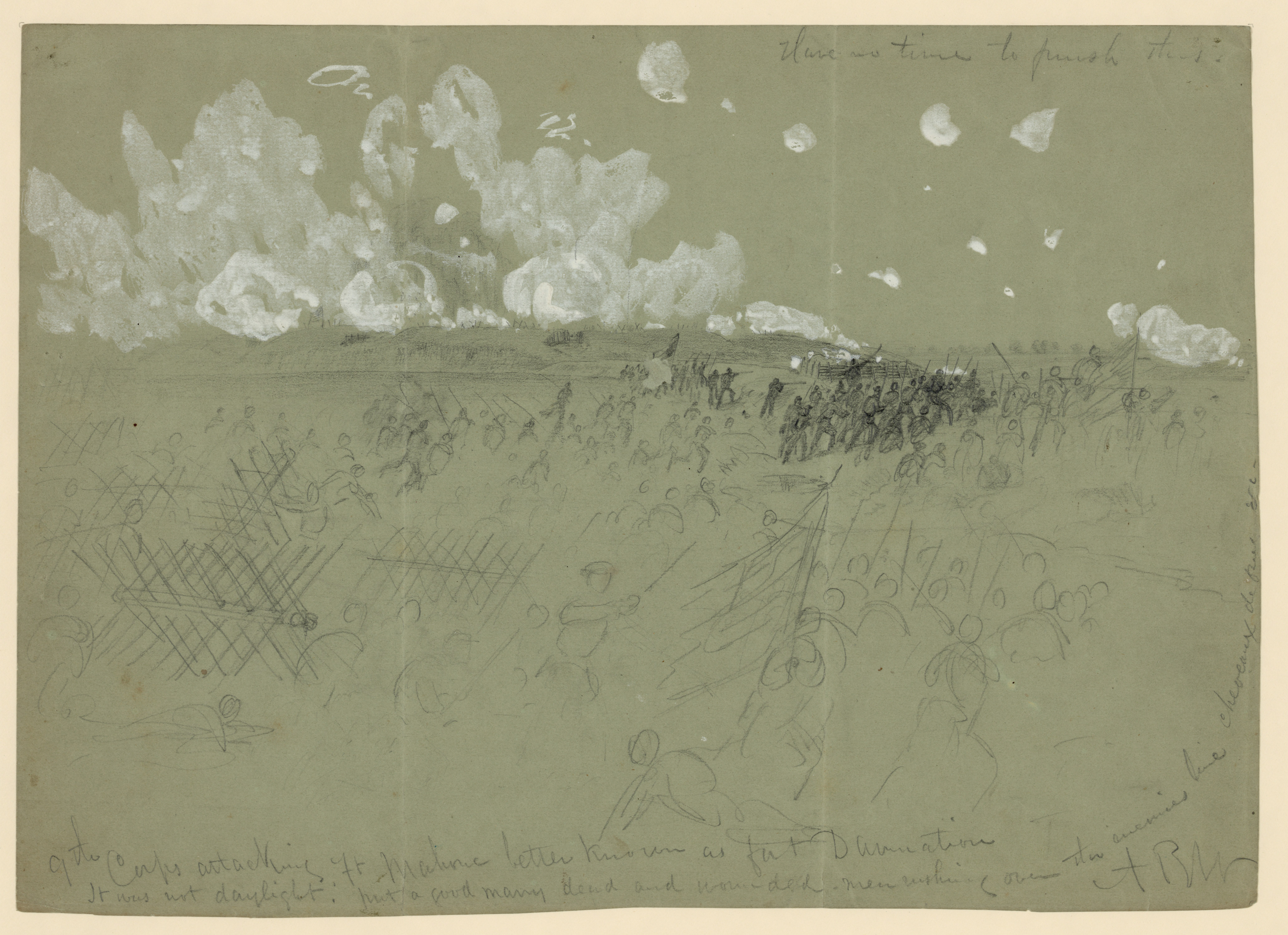
Union Army 9th Corps attacking Fort Mahone aka "Fort Damanation" sketch by Alfred Ward.

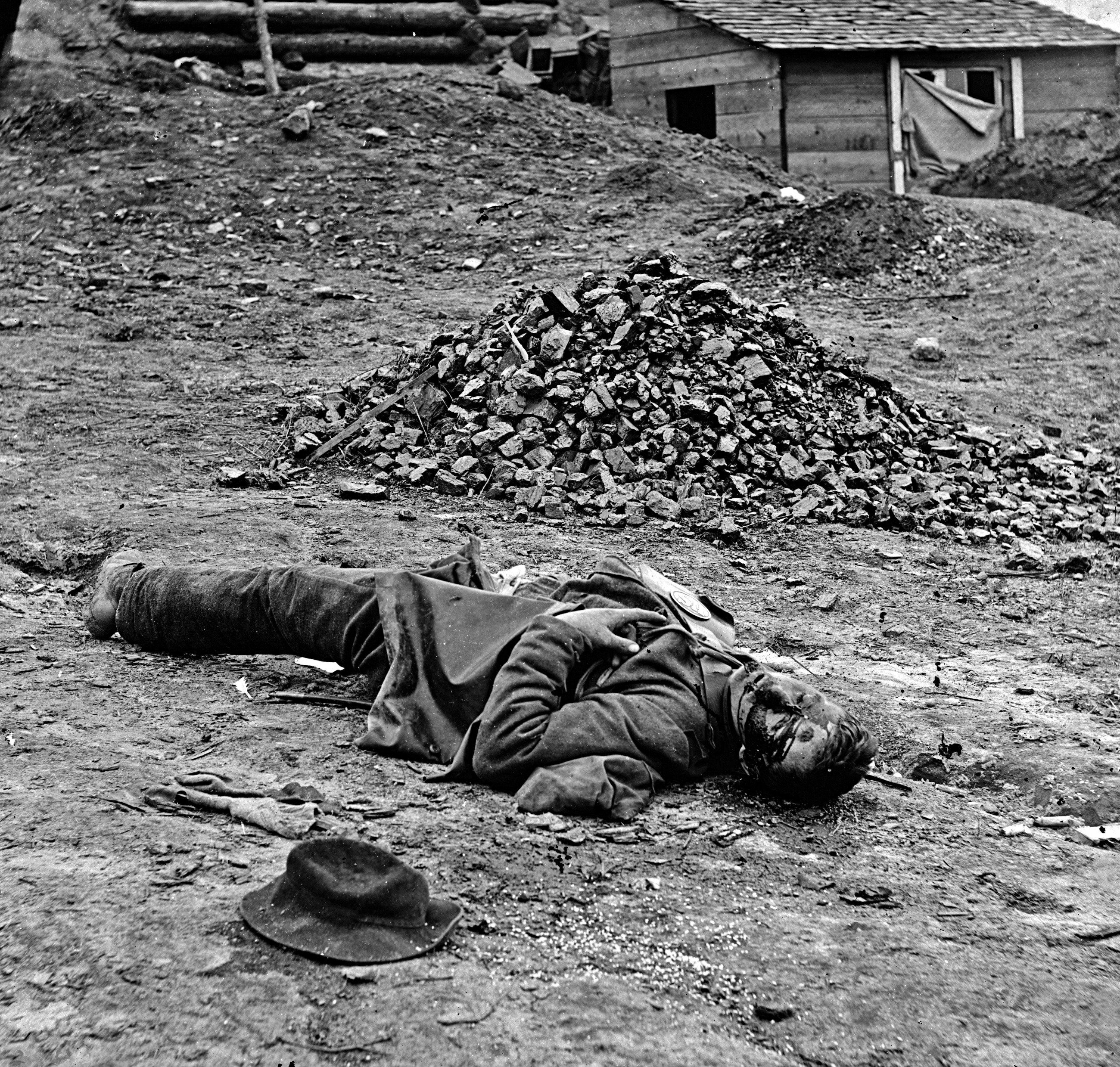
Confederate artilleryman killed during the final Union assault against the trenches at Petersburg. Photo by Thomas C. Roche, April 3, 1865. Although prints of this picture list it as being taken at Ft Mahone, historians at the "Petersburg Project" believe it was taken at Confederate Battery 25

==== Humphreys's attack on White Oak Road; lost opportunity ====
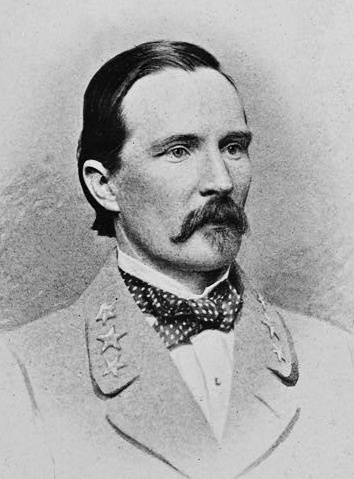
Major General Henry Heth

Major General Andrew A. Humphreys's II Corps faced the division of Major General Henry Heth in the line running from Hatcher's Run to White Oak Road. After the Union victory at the Battle of Five Forks on April 1, in response to Grant's 9:00 p.m. order for an immediate assault on the Confederate lines, Humphreys ordered Nelson A. Miles's and Gershom Mott's divisions to attack at once. They could not do more than drive in the Confederate pickets as Confederate artillery opened up on them. Then, as Grant had ordered, Miles's division was sent to Sheridan just before midnight but Mott's and Hays's divisions continued probing the Confederate line.

At 6:00 a.m. on April 2, in view of the report of the VI Corps' successful advance, Humphreys ordered Hays to assault the redoubts opposite the II Corps' line, including the Crow House redoubt beside Hatcher's Run. The attack captured the Confederate redoubts, their artillery and the majority of their garrisons. At about 7:30 a.m., Mott captured the Confederate picket line at Burgess's Mill and at 8:30 a.m. Mott sharply attacked the Confederate trenches on their right flank, which then were rapidly evacuated. By 8:30 a.m., Humphreys's divisions held the Confederate works from Burgess's Mill to Claiborne Road. The retreating defenders withdrew to the northwest to Sutherland's Station.

Then Humphreys's corps received conflicting information and a variety of orders. Humphreys planned to attack fugitives from Major Generals Henry Heth's and Bushrod Johnson's divisions but ultimately only Nelson Miles's division with about 8,000 troops in four brigades fought the Confederates at the Battle of Sutherland's Station, while Mott's and Hays's divisions were engaged in futile marches and countermarches.

=== Sutherland's Station (April 2) ===
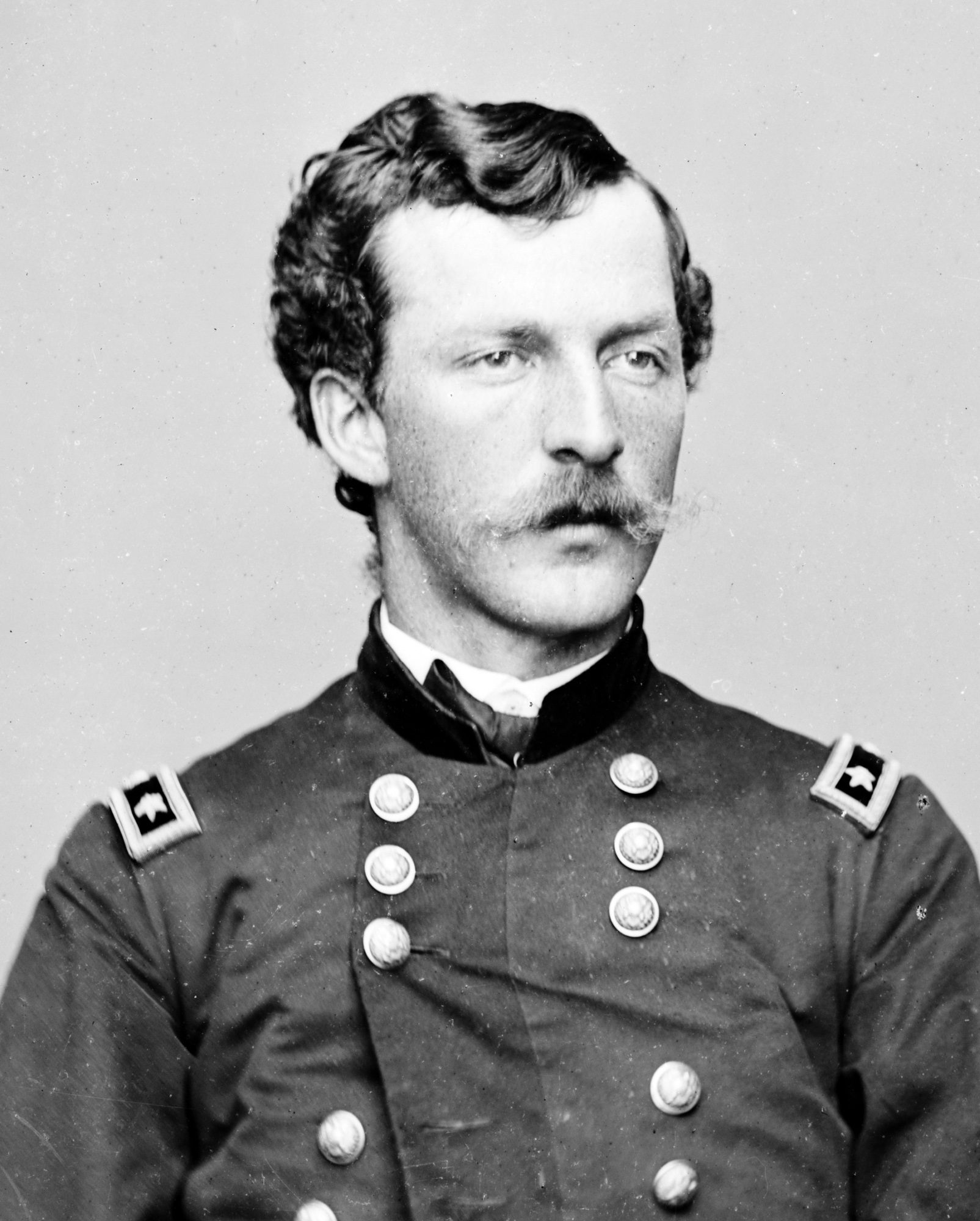
Brigadier General Nelson A. Miles

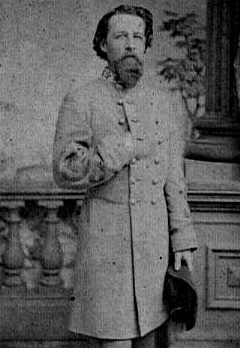
Brigadier General John R. Cooke

The Battle of Sutherland's Station was fought about 19 miles (31 km) west of Petersburg along Cox Road and the Southside Railroad during the early afternoon at about the same time as the Battle for Fort Gregg during the Third Battle of Petersburg. At 6:00 a.m. on April 2, Major General Andrew A. Humphreys ordered Brigadier General William Hays to assault the Confederate redoubts opposite the II Corps' line, including the Crow House redoubt beside Hatcher's Run and Brigadier General (Brevet Major General) Gershom Mott to attack the line in front of his division. The II Corps faced the division of Major General Henry Heth in the line running from Hatcher's Run to White Oak Road. Heth's brigades were commanded by Brigadier General Samuel McGowan, Brigadier General John R. Cooke (part), Brigadier General William MacRae (part) and Colonel Joseph H. Hyman in lieu of Brigadier General Alfred Moore Scales, although temporarily commanded by Colonel Thomas S. Galloway of the 22nd North Carolina Infantry of Cadmus Wilcox's division. By 8:30 a.m., Humphreys's divisions held the Confederate works from Burgess's Mill to Claiborne Road. The retreating defenders withdrew to the northwest to Sutherland's Station on the South Side Railroad.

Under orders from General Grant, Brigadier General Nelson A. Miles's division had been sent to reinforce Major General Philip Sheridan's command on the Five Forks battlefield at midnight on April 1 in the event an additional Confederate force were sent to attack Sheridan or a large force of Confederates in retreat might come upon his men. No Confederate force appeared and about 7:30 a.m., Miles headed back east on White Oak Road and sent a message about his movement to Humphreys. Miles found the Confederates gone from the fortifications at the end of their former main line and headed north on Claiborne Road in pursuit as Humphreys had ordered.

Humphreys also ordered Mott and Hays as well as Miles to pursue Heth's men toward Sutherland's Station where he expected to attack a Confederate force consisting of Major General Henry Heth's retreating men, Lieutenant General Richard H. Anderson's command consisting of Bushrod Johnson's division and Eppa Hunton's brigade, which had been sent to Five Forks on April 1 too late to reinforce Pickett, and any available men from the scattered force of George Pickett and Fitzhugh Lee's cavalry. General Meade, who came out to meet Humphreys about 9:00 a.m., did not approve of this action and ordered Humphreys to move his corps toward Petersburg and connect with General Wright.

Humphreys rode over the White Oak Road and Claiborne Road to recall Miles. Humphreys came upon Sheridan who wanted to keep Miles's division to help attack any remaining Confederate forces in the area but Humphreys told him of Meade's order. Humphreys later said he left Miles for Sheridan to command while Sheridan said that he declined further command of Miles's division in order to "avoid wrangles." Miles never commented under whose authority he proceeded to Sutherland's Station, but he did so without Humphreys's other divisions or other support from Sheridan or the V Corps. Humphreys and Sheridan left Miles with about 8,000 troops in four brigades, to the task of fighting the Confederates gathered at Sutherland's Station. Humphreys went back to join his two other divisions on the road to Petersburg.

Miles was convinced he could defeat Heth's force, which was now under the command of Brigadier General John R. Cooke because Heth had been called to Petersburg to take charge of A.P. Hill's corps due to Hill's death. Cooke, who had four brigades totaling about 1,200 men from Heth's division, had been ordered by Heth to protect the supply trains already parked at Sutherland's Station. The entire Confederate force at Sutherland's Station was estimated by a staff officer at about 4,000 men. Cooke's men threw up a slender line of earthworks about 0.5 miles (0.80 km) long along Cox Road parallel to the railroad with an open field about 700 yards (640 m) with a slight slope in front. Heth had placed Cooke's men on favorable ground between Sutherland Tavern and Ocran Methodist Church with a refused left flank and sharpshooters deployed in front as skirmishers.

Miles first ordered only Colonel (Brevet Brigadier General) Henry J. Madill's brigade to attack Cooke's and Hyman's (Galloway's) positions. Madill's men were exhausted from a night and morning of marching and Madill himself was severely wounded as the Confederates repulsed the assault. Then, Miles ordered an attack on MacRae's and McGowan's positions again with Colonel Madill's brigade, now under the command of Colonel (Brevet Brigadier General) Clinton McDougall and Colonel Robert Nugent's brigade. The two brigades again were repulsed with Colonel McDougall being wounded. After an interval to regroup, Miles's division finally overcame the Confederate right flank defenders with an attack at 4:00 p.m. by a strong skirmish line, MacDougall's and Nugent's brigades and Lieutenant Colonel (Brevet Brigadier General) John Ramsey's brigade. The Union attackers captured 600 prisoners, two guns and a battle flag.

When McGowan's men finally gave way, Cooke's brigades collapsed from east to west although Cooke's own brigade was farthest from the end of the line and withdrew in better order than the other survivors who managed to escape. The Confederates who did not become casualties or prisoners retreated toward the Appomattox River, moving mostly in disorder toward Amelia Court House. The South Side Railroad, the final Confederate supply line to Petersburg, had been permanently severed by the Union Army. Most of Miles's men were too exhausted to pursue the Confederate fugitives. (Note: Greene, 2008, p. 331 does point out that Colonel George W. Scott's brigade had not been committed to the battle and was relatively fresh.) Besides, Miles understood that Sheridan had ordered his men to drive the enemy toward Petersburg, so he turned his division in that direction and allowed them to rest.

At 2:30 p.m., Major General Meade had learned of Miles's difficulties subduing Cooke's force and ordered Major General Humphreys to take one of his divisions back to Sutherland's Station to support Miles. By the time Humphreys arrived back at Sutherland's Station with Hays's division, he found out that Miles's final attack had been successful. Miles and Hays camped near Sutherland's Station to protect their roadblock of the railroad. Humphreys later wrote that the whole Confederate force probably would have been captured if the II Corps had been able to continue to Sutherland's Station that morning. Other than the 600 taken prisoners, Confederate casualties at Sutherland's Station are unknown. Miles had 366 casualties.

Skirmishing also occurred on April 2 at Gravelly Ford on Hatcher's Run and at Scott's Cross Roads.

Sheridan's cavalry and the V Corps did little more than occupy the vacated works along White Oak Road after both the Confederates and the II Corps left the area.

==== Casualties ====
The Union forces lost 3,936 men on April 2, 1865. Confederate casualties were at least 5,000, most of whom were taken prisoner.

==== Decision to withdraw ====
After the VI Corps' morning breakthrough, Lee advised the Confederate government to abandon the cities of Petersburg and Richmond. His plan at this point was to move his forces from the two cities to cross the Appomattox River and meet up at Amelia Court House, Virginia, where they could be resupplied at the Richmond and Danville Railroad from stocks evacuated from Richmond. They would then proceed to Danville, Virginia, the destination of the fleeing Confederate government, and then south to join with the Confederate force in North Carolina under the command of General Joseph Johnston. After dark, Lee began the evacuation of his troops from Petersburg and Richmond. The city of Richmond was evacuated that night, and the Confederate government fled. Lieutenant General Richard S. Ewell, in charge of the city's defenses, was ordered to destroy anything of military value. Civilians rioted and great conflagrations engulfed the city.

=== Union occupation of Richmond and Petersburg; Davis reaches Danville (April 3) ===
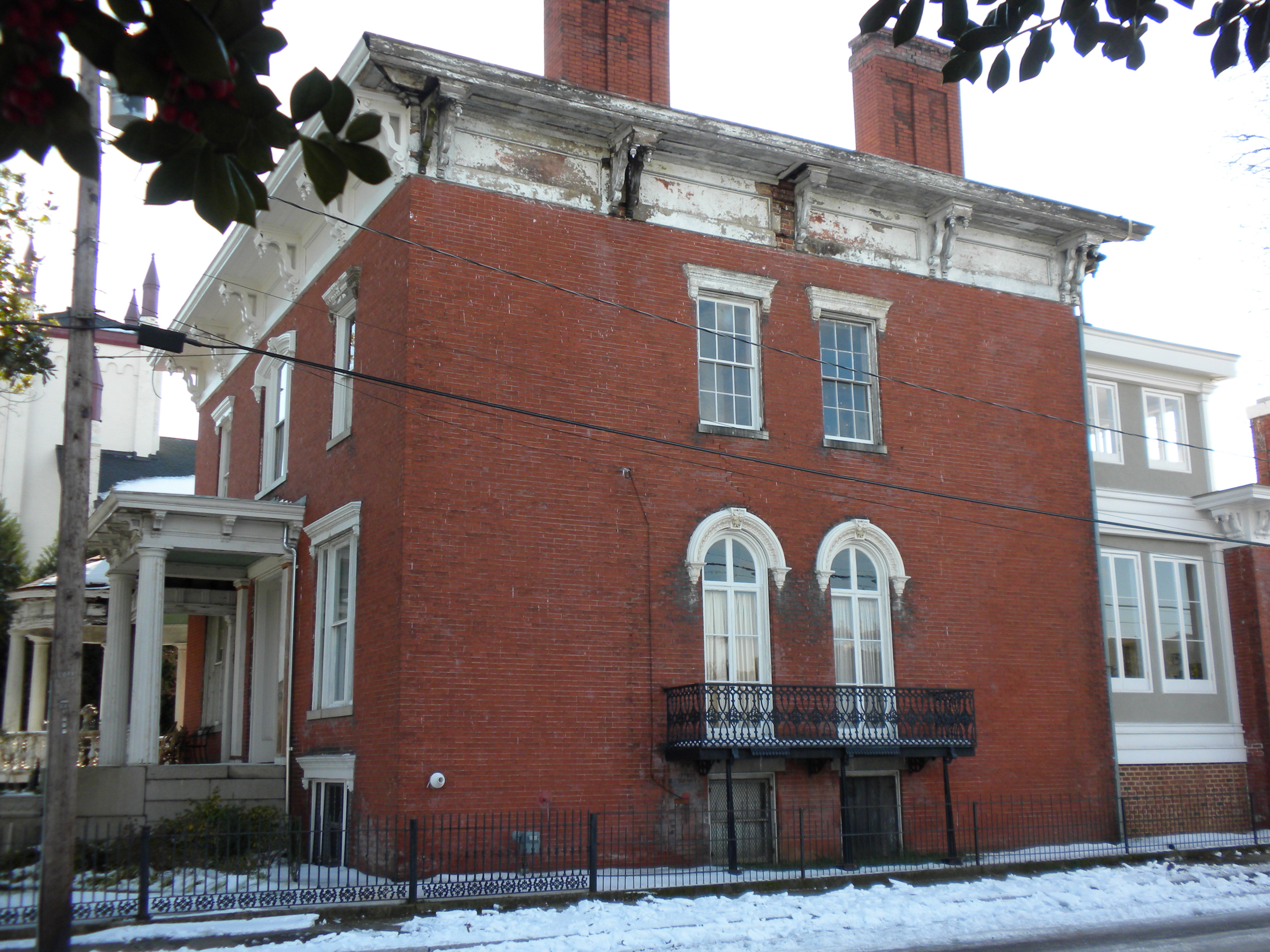
Thomas Wallace House at Petersburg, Virginia

Union troops of the XXV Corps of the Army of the James under Major General Godfrey Weitzel occupied Richmond and began to put out fires and restore order. Union troops from the 1st Division of IX Corps (Union Army) under Major General Orlando Willcox also occupied Petersburg, with the 1st Michigan Sharpshooters Regiment being the first Union troops into the city and the Michiganders would raise their flag from the Petersburg Courthouse. Lieutenant General Grant and President Lincoln met at a private home. Confederate President Jefferson Davis and most of his Cabinet reached Danville, Virginia, by the middle of the day.

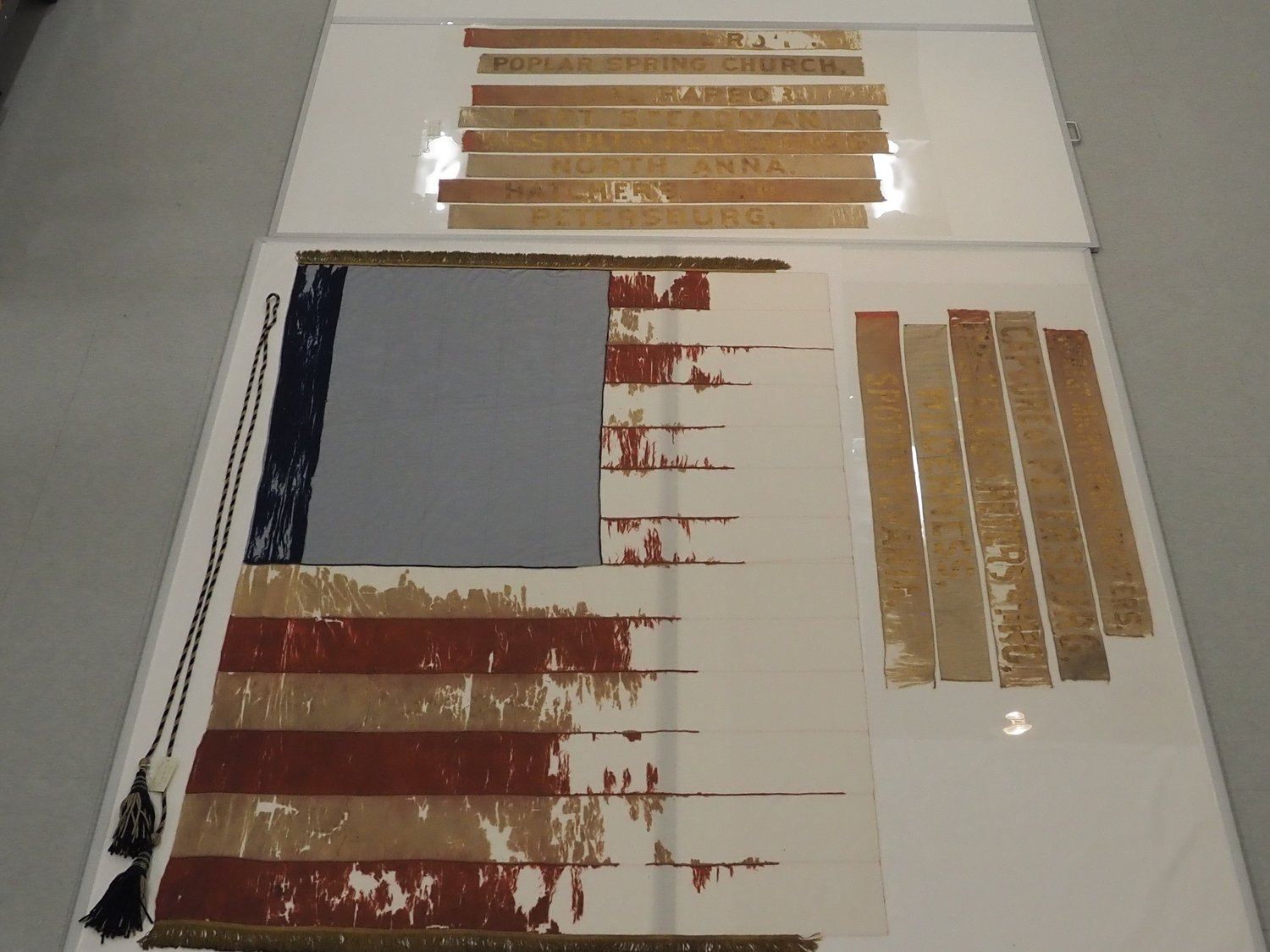
Flag of the 1st Michigan Sharpshooters, which included the battle honor of "First flag in Petersburg”, now currently in the collections of Save the Flags and the Michigan Historical Center.

=== Lincoln visits Richmond (April 4) ===
President Lincoln visited Richmond escorted by Rear Admiral David Dixon Porter, 3 officers and 10 sailors. Jubilant African-Americans surrounded him on his walk. Lincoln conferred with Major General Weitzel, talked with former U.S. Supreme Court Justice and Confederate Assistant Secretary of War John A. Campbell and sat at Jefferson Davis's desk at his former home, the Confederate White House. Thomas Morris Chester, African-American correspondent for The Philadelphia Press, was among those who reported on the events.

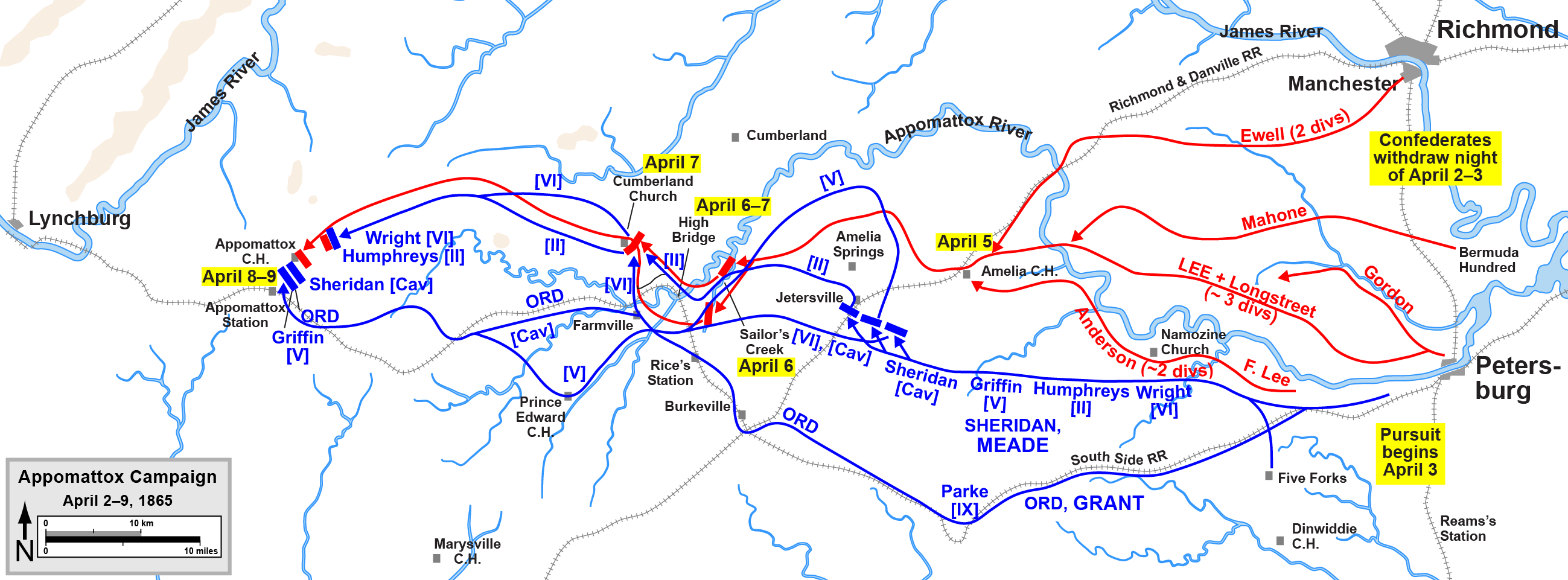
Lee's retreat and Grant's pursuit, April 2–9, 1865

== Confederate retreat ==
=== Namozine Church (April 3) ===
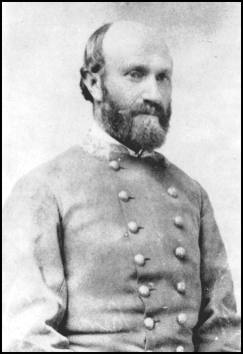
Brigadier General Rufus Barringer

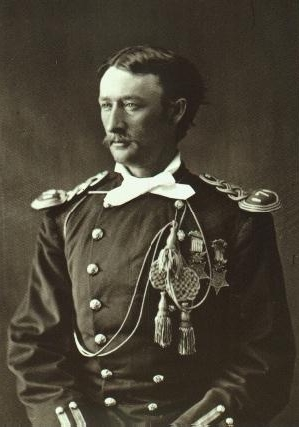
Captain Thomas Custer

Confederate forces headed for a rendezvous point at Amelia Court House with Union forces pursuing, mostly on parallel routes. On April 3, 1865, advance units under Colonel (Brevet Brigadier General) William Wells of the Union cavalry division commanded by Brigadier General (Brevet Major General) George Armstrong Custer fought with rear guard Confederate cavalry commanded by Brigadier General William Paul Roberts and Brigadier General Rufus Barringer at Willicomack Creek and Namozine Church. Unlike most of the Confederate forces that started their movements to the west north of the Appomattox River, these units were moving on roads south of that river.

Custer's younger brother, Captain Tom Custer, spurred his horse over a hastily thrown up barricade of the still deploying Confederate cavalry and captured 3 Confederate officers and 11 enlisted men, as well as the battle flag of the 2nd North Carolina Cavalry, for which he received the Medal of Honor. Barringer's Confederate cavalry had bought enough time for Major General Bushrod Johnson's infantry division to pass nearby Namozine Church. Although they initially took the wrong fork in the road at Namozine Church, Johnson's forces were able to turn around, hold off the Union cavalry and head up the correct road toward Amelia Court House. Custer later chased the fleeing Confederates but near dark he ran into substantial infantry opposition from Johnson's division at Sweathouse Creek.

After dark, Wells's brigade continued to attack Fitzhugh Lee's force along Deep Creek. Brigadier General Barringer and many of his men were captured by Sheridan's scouts who were wearing gray uniforms and led Barringer and his remaining men into a trap. Colonel (Brevet Brigadier General) Wells lost 95 Federal cavalrymen killed and wounded in the engagements at Namozine Creek, Namozine Church and Sweathouse Creek. Total Confederate losses are not known, but Custer's men were able to capture many Confederates. The Union cavalrymen took 350 prisoners, 100 horses and an artillery piece while initially clearing the road as far as the Namozine Church. Johnson reported 15 wounded from his division.

=== Beaver Pond Creek or Tabernacle Church (April 4) ===
Most of the Confederate Army had marched about 21 miles (34 km) west on April 3. Most of the Union Army continued to pursue the Confederates on a parallel route to the south of the Confederate line of march. In order to meet at the rendezvous point of Amelia Court House that had been designated by General Lee, all of the Confederate commands except those of Richard Anderson and Fitzhugh Lee would have to cross the Appomattox River, which turns sharply to the north not far west of the Confederate camps on the night of April 3. Along the Union Army routes, hundreds of exhausted and demoralized Confederates surrendered to the passing Union troops.

By the evening of April 3, most of Longstreet's troops had crossed to the west side of the Appomattox River over Goode's Bridge while Gordon's men were east of the bridge. Amelia Court House was 8.5 miles (13.7 km) to the west. Ewell's force could not cross the river at the Genito Bridge as expected because an expected pontoon bridge had not arrived. After marching south, Ewell's men crossed the river on a Richmond and Danville Railroad bridge over which they had placed planks. They camped on April 4 about 1 mile (1.6 km) west of the bridge. Gordon's corps was at Scott's Shop, 5 miles (8.0 km) east of Amelia Court House, waiting for Ewell's column to catch up. Mahone's men marched to Goode's Bridge but did not go into Amelia Court House until he was told that the force from Richmond had arrived.

On the line of march west toward the Confederate Army's rendezvous point of Amelia Court House on Bevill's Bridge Road, Lieutenant General Anderson had the remaining men of George Pickett's and Bushrod Johnson's divisions build earthworks and form a line of battle at Tabernacle Church Road to protect the forces in retreat from attack from the pursuing Union forces to their south. Nearby, Union cavalry were working to clear a sabotaged ford on Deep Creek Road in an effort to catch up with Lee's army. The ford proved too deep for the cavalry to cross when they finished dragging away obstructions and the Union horsemen had to take a long alternate route back to the road. George Custer's cavalry division rode west toward Jetersville, Virginia, on the Richmond and Danville Railroad, 8 miles (13 km) southwest of Amelia Court House and 10 miles (16 km) northeast of Burkeville Junction, Virginia.

Brigadier General (Brevet Major General) Wesley Merritt with Thomas Devin's cavalry division crossed Deep Creek at Brown's Bridge and headed straight past Tabernacle Church to Beaver Pond Creek where late in the day, a Michigan regiment from the division sent Anderson's skirmishers back to their field works. Coming up toward the works, Devin's entire division, mostly dismounted, skirmished with portions of Heth's, Johnson's and Pickett's infantry. About 10:00 p.m., Devin was ordered to pull back to Jetersville and he led his men to that point after burning a nearby mill.

=== Amelia Court House (April 4) ===
On the morning of April 4, Union Brigadier General Ranald Mackenzie's command crossed Deep Creek and reached the Five Forks of Amelia County, only about 1 mile (1.6 km) south of Amelia Court House, where his 1st Maryland Cavalry (U.S.) skirmished with the 14th Virginia Cavalry.

An advance party of Major General George Crook's division reached the important railroad intersection of Burkeville Junction, Virginia, by 3:00 p.m., blocking the Richmond and Danville Railroad route to the southwest. The main body of Crook's cavalry division and Brigadier General Joshua Chamberlain's infantry brigade from the V Corps also headed toward Jetersville, arriving before dark. A few hours later, the rest of the V Corps arrived at Jetersville and started to entrench, even extending the trenches across the railroad tracks. The arrival of the entire V Corps at Jetersville ended Lee's last chance to move south along the railroad, although if he had chosen to send Longstreet's corps which had arrived first at Amelia Court House south against the gathering Union force, his trailing divisions probably could not have caught up. Ewell was still trying to cross the Appomattox River at 10:00 p.m.; Anderson was still skirmishing with Devin at Beaver Pond Creek; Gordon was several miles behind at Scott's Shop; and Mahone was not far from Goode's Bridge, waiting to protect the bridge in case Ewell could find no other river crossing. When Devin's cavalry broke off the engagement at Beaver Pond Creek, no Union force threatened the rear of Lee's army and Anderson's and Mahone's forces did not need to lag behind as rear guards. They did not arrive at Amelia Court House until well into the next day.

Lee had expected to find rations for the army at Amelia Court House but found only an inadequate stockpile of rations and a trainload of ordnance. Lee waited for the rest of the army to catch up and sent foraging parties into the county which yielded few provisions despite Lee's personal appeal in a proclamation that day. Yet Union Army foragers, perhaps being less sensitive to the reluctance or needs of local residents, seemed to have been able to find abundant provisions on the march as their wagons began to fall far behind on the muddy roads. Lee also ordered 200,000 rations to be sent from Danville via the railroad. Sheridan intercepted this message at Jetersville later that day. Lee also ordered that the number of wagons and artillery pieces with the army be reduced and precede the infantry on the march with the best horses. The extra equipment was to be sent by a circuitous route to the north with the weaker animals, sent by rail or destroyed. The 200 guns and 1,000 wagons that Lee's army had taken on their flight would be reduced by almost one-third.

A week later, Lee said the delay at Amelia Court House assured the Confederate defeat and surrender. Some modern historians have emphasized the failure to have an expected pontoon bridge at the Genito Road crossing was the key factor in keeping Lee's trailing divisions from reaching Amelia Court House on April 4. A pontoon bridge had been placed at Goode's Bridge but traffic there became heavily congested because the approaches to Bevill's Bridge also were blocked by high water. Lee did not mention the missing pontoon bridge in his remarks a week later but instead blamed the delay entirely on the lack of supplies at Amelia Court House, but as some historians have pointed out, many of his men and wagons had not arrived at Amelia Court House on April 4 and were not in a position to advance until some time on April 5 even if he had not stopped the others to rest and forage. Historian William Marvel wrote that "as badly as Lee needed to keep moving that night, he needed even more to concentrate his forces."

=== Paineville; Amelia Springs (April 5–6) ===
On the morning of April 5, Sheridan sent Brigadier General Henry E. Davies's brigade of Major General George Crook's division to scout for Confederate movements beyond Amelia Court House near Paineville, or Paine's Cross Roads, about 5 miles (8.0 km) north of Amelia Springs. About 4 miles (6.4 km) east of Paineville, Davies found and attacked a wagon train that had left Richmond with provisions for Lee's army, including food, ammunition and headquarters baggage, which was guarded by Brigadier General Martin Gary's cavalry brigade and another wagon train with excess artillery from Amelia Court House approaching from the south.

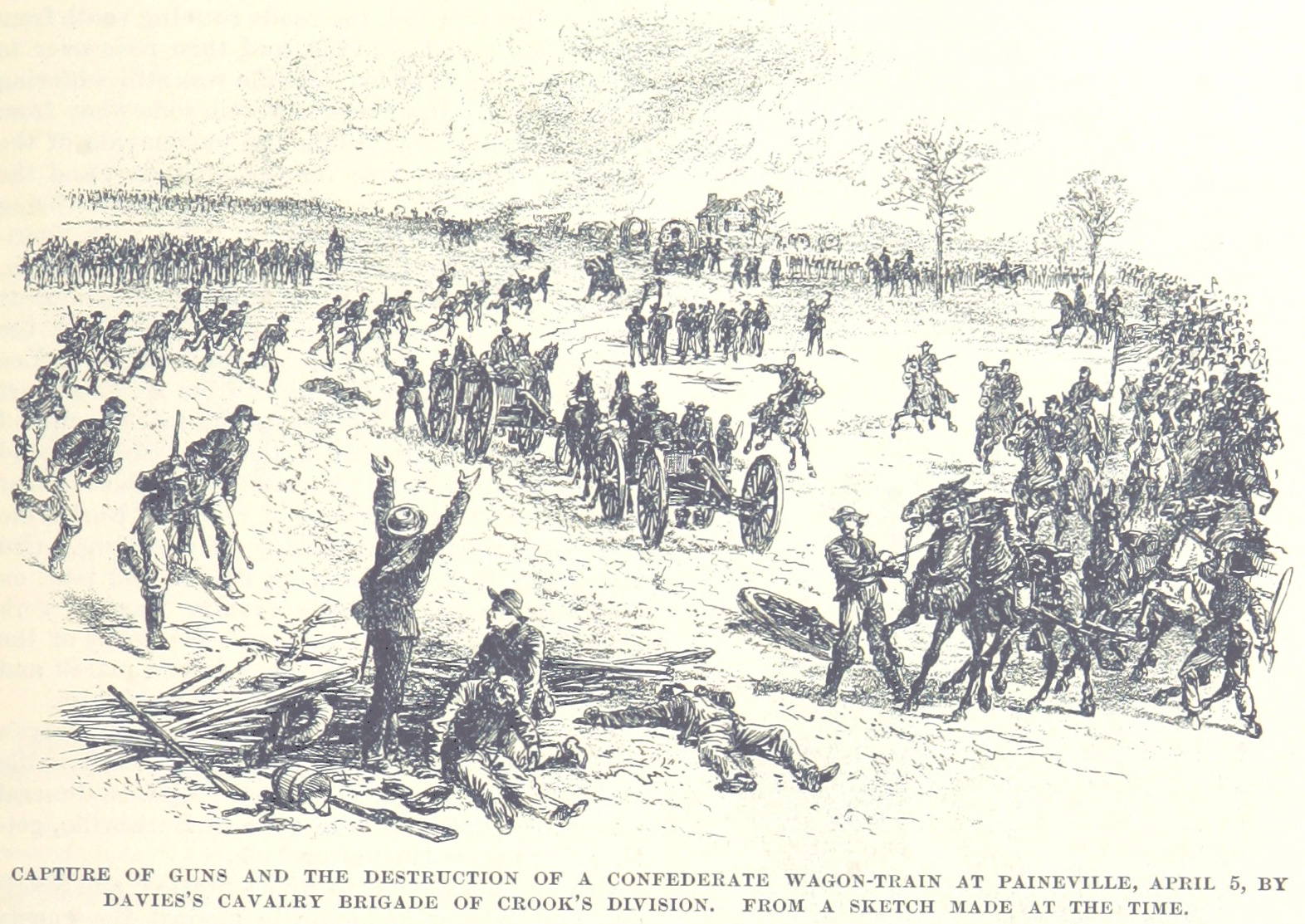
Davies captures the wagon train

Davies began to return to Jetersville after burning many of Confederate wagons including headquarters wagons, capturing horses, mules and some artillery pieces, and taking 630 prisoners, at Paineville or Paine's Cross Roads. Major General Fitzhugh Lee with the Confederate cavalry divisions of Major General Thomas L. Rosser and Colonel Thomas T. Munford assaulted the Union cavalry on their return, starting a running fight from north of Amelia Springs to within 1 mile (1.6 km) of Jetersville.

Reaching as far as Amelia Springs, the other brigades of Crook's division under Brigadier General J. Irvin Gregg and Colonel (Brevet Brigadier General) Charles H. Smith provided reinforcements, allowing Davies's force to reach Jetersville with their prisoners, guns and teams.

Crook's cavalry division had casualties of 13 killed, 81 wounded and 72 missing and probably taken prisoner in three encounters during the day. Fitzhugh Lee said he counted 30 dead Union soldiers along the way. (Note: Calkins, 1997, p. 88 gives the Union casualties as 30 killed and 150 wounded but gives the lower number in the text in his appendix on page 202.) Davies captured 320 Confederate soldiers and 310 African-Americans whom he described as teamsters. He also captured 400 animals and 11 flags while destroying about 200 wagons. Confederate casualties were unreported but two Confederate captains are known to have been mortally wounded.

Starting to move his army toward Jetersville at 1:00 p.m. with Longstreet's corps in the lead, Lee discovered that his route to Danville was blocked by fast-moving Union cavalry. He did not think that he could bring up his army fast enough to fight their way through before large numbers of Union infantry would arrive.

His only remaining option was to move west on a long march, without food, to Lynchburg. But the Confederate Commissary General promised Lee that he would send 80,000 rations to Farmville, 23 mi (37 km) to the west on the South Side Railroad.

A skirmish took place at Flat Creek, near Amelia Springs, on April 6 as the armies began to engage in fighting leading up to the Battle of Sailor's Creek.

=== Sailor's Creek (April 6) ===
When General Robert E. Lee discovered that his route to Danville was blocked at Jetersville, he knew his army had to make another night march to Farmville. Lieutenant General Ulysses S. Grant and Major General Philip Sheridan were convinced that Lee's army would not remain at Amelia Court House another night, but Army of the Potomac commander Major General George Meade thought that they would. Meade ordered the II Corps, V Corps and VI Corps to move toward Amelia Court House at 6:00 a.m. and Grant did not order him to do otherwise, only to move swiftly. Sheridan did not move with the infantry but sent his cavalry to follow a road parallel and to the south of Lee's line of march to try to intercept the Confederates.

As it developed, the Battle of Sailor's Creek was actually three engagements fought in close proximity at about the same time. Major General Horatio Wright's VI Corps battled Lieutenant General Richard S. Ewell's corps at the Hillsman House. Union cavalry led by Brigadier General (Brevet Major General) Wesley Merritt fought Lieutenant General Richard Anderson's corps at Marshall's Crossroads. After a running battle over several miles, Major General Andrew A. Humphreys's II Corps engaged Major General John B. Gordon's corps at Lockett's Farm. (Note: General Humphreys titled a subsection in his book: The Battles of Sailor's Creek. Humphreys, 1883, p. 381.)

At Sailor's Creek, between one-fifth and one-fourth of the remaining retreating Confederate army was taken prisoner or became casualties (about 8,000 men, with about 7,700 men taken prisoner, including most of Richard S. Ewell's corps and about half of Richard H. Anderson's corps). Many Confederate officers were captured, including eight generals – Lieutenant General Richard S. Ewell, Major General George Washington Custis Lee, Major General Joseph B. Kershaw, and Brigadier Generals Seth M. Barton, James P. Simms, Dudley M. Du Bose, Eppa Hunton, and Montgomery D. Corse. Colonel Stapleton Crutchfield, who had participated in the defenses of Richmond, was killed leading a detachment of artillery personnel during a counterattack by Ewell's men. General Humphreys later stated that the disorder of the Confederates after their defeats at Five Forks, Sutherland's Station and the Breakthrough at Petersburg "doubtless scattered them to such an extent that many being without rations did not rejoin their commands." He went on to say that: "In the movement to Amelia Court House, and from that point to Sailor's Creek, Farmville and Appomattox Court House, having but scanty supplies and being exhausted by want of sleep and food and overcome with fatigue, many men fell out or wandered in search of food."

Upon returning to the scene near the end of the battle with Major General William Mahone's division, and from a bluff across Sailor's Creek seeing the disorganization on the field and survivors streaming along the road, Lee exclaimed "My God, has the army dissolved?" General Mahone replied, "No, General, here are troops ready to do their duty." Lee then said to Mahone, "Yes, there are still some true men left ... Will you please keep those people back?" Mahone's division remained on the opposite bank covering the escape of the fugitives but was not engaged in more combat.

=== Rice's Station (April 6) ===
The Battle of Rice's Station was a minor engagement in that was fought at the same time as the Battle of Sailor's Creek on April 6, 1865. In the early morning of April 6, Lieutenant General James Longstreet's command reached Rice's Station, Virginia (now Rice, Virginia) on the South Side Railroad. As Longstreet's corps was the first to reach Rice's Station after Lee moved his army west from Amelia Springs, Virginia, they awaited the remainder of the army.

The XXIV Corps commanded by Major General John Gibbon from Major General Edward O. C. Ord's Army of the James had occupied Burkeville Junction, Virginia, a junction of the South Side Railroad and Richmond and Danville Railroad to the southeast of Rice's Station, on the night of April 5. When Longstreet arrived at Rice's Station, he learned that Ord's troops were at Burkeville Junction and ordered his men to dig in along the tracks and roads into town. During the morning of April 6, after being warned that Lee's Army was on the march, Ord and Gibbon had moved cautiously up the railroad and found Longstreet's force digging in near Rice's Station. Gibbon's skirmishers slowly formed for an attack and had a minor confrontation with the entrenched Confederates. As darkness approached and being unsure of the size of the Confederate force, Ord decided to wait for Sheridan and Meade to come up from behind. The Union force suffered 66 casualties before going into bivouac as darkness approached. Exact Confederate casualties are unknown.

With the Union Army nearby after the disastrous Confederate defeat at Sailor's Creek, under General Lee's order, Longstreet withdrew during the night towards Farmville, Virginia, where rations were waiting.

=== High Bridge (April 6–7) ===
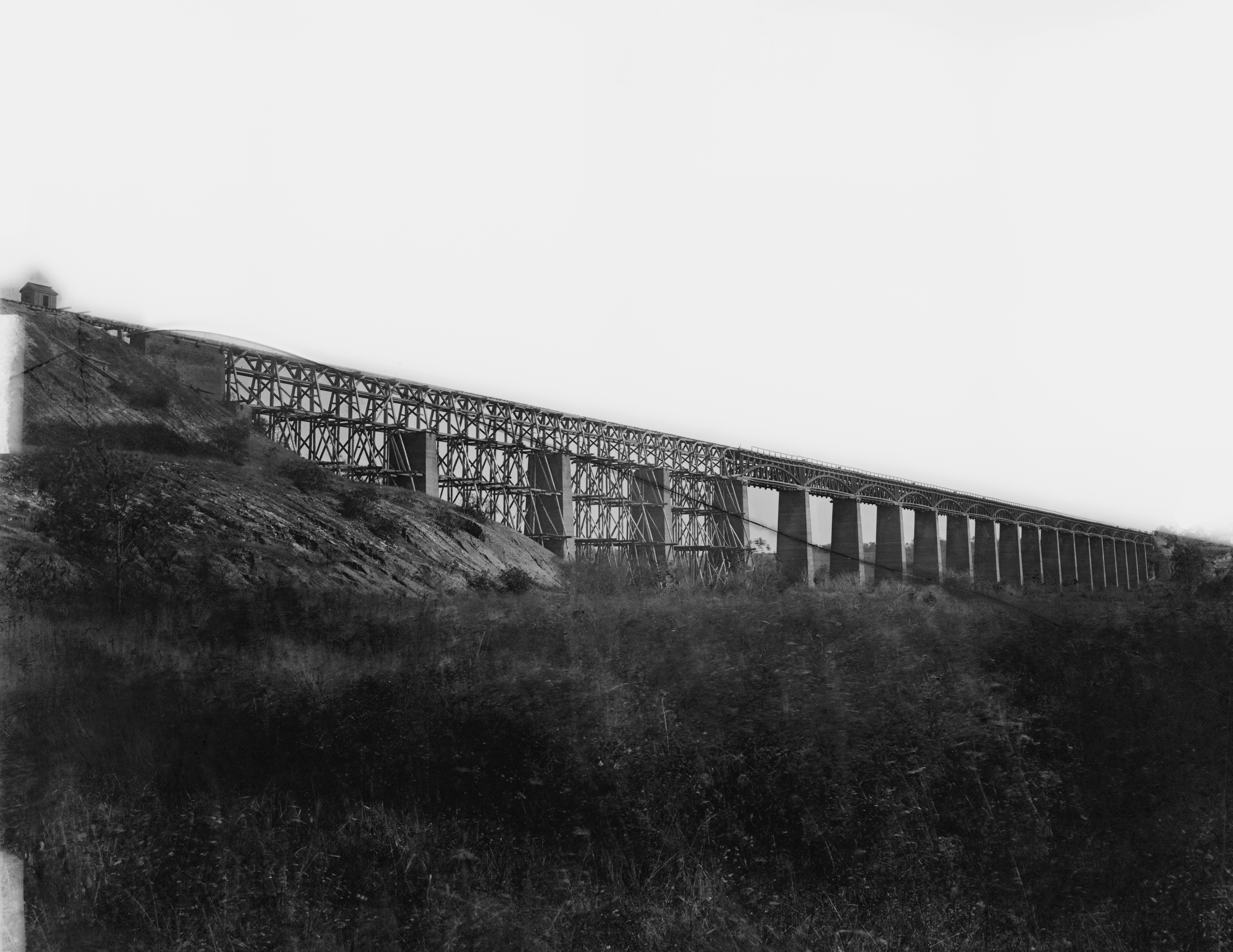
High Bridge Picture by Timothy H. O'Sullivan, 1865

At the first Battle of High Bridge on April 6, 1865, Confederates stopped a large Union raiding party from burning High Bridge before Confederates south of the Appomattox River could pass over it to the north side. The Confederates took at least 800 Union survivors as prisoners. Union Colonel (Brevet Brigadier General) Theodore Read was killed, possibly in a pistol shootout with Confederate Colonel James Dearing (often identified as a brigadier general but his appointment was never confirmed), who was also mortally wounded in the encounter.

On April 7, 1865, at the second Battle of High Bridge, after the bulk of Lee's remaining army crossed the Appomattox River, Longstreet's rear guard tried to burn the bridges behind them. The Union II Corps managed to extinguish the blazes on two of the bridges, and they crossed the river and caught up with the Confederates at Farmville. Fitzhugh Lee's cavalry was able to hold off the Union infantry until nightfall, but Lee was forced to continue his march to the west under this pressure, depriving his men the opportunity to eat the Farmville rations they had waited so long to receive. Their next stop would be Appomattox Station, 25 mi (40 km) west, where a ration train was waiting. However, this train would be mostly destroyed by Union troops before their arrival.

=== Farmville (April 7) ===
Longstreet's Confederate forces held off the Union Army advance near Farmville, crossed the Appomattox River and continued their retreat on the north side of the river.

On the night of April 7, Lee received from Grant, then headquartered at Farmville, a letter proposing that the Army of Northern Virginia should surrender. Lee demurred, retaining one last hope that his army could get to Appomattox Station before he was trapped. He returned a noncommittal letter asking about the surrender terms Grant might propose.

=== Cumberland Church (April 7) ===
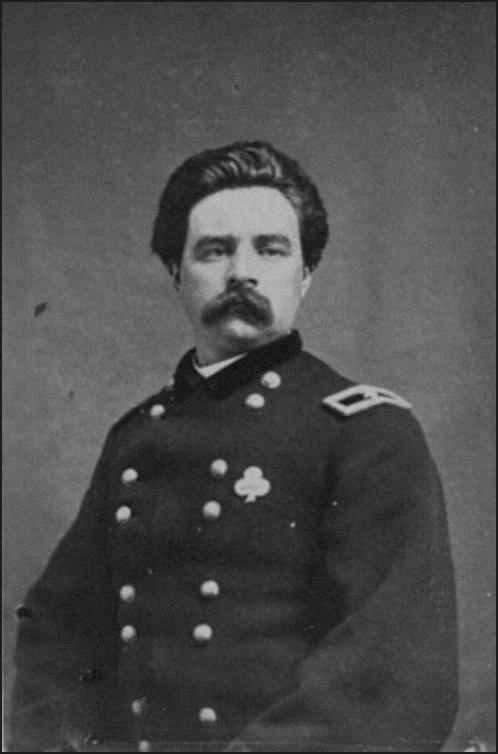
Brigadier General Thomas Alfred Smyth

At about 2 p.m. on April 7, the advance of the Union II Corps encountered Confederate forces entrenched on high ground near Cumberland Church. The Union forces attacked twice but were repulsed, and darkness halted the conflict. Union Brigadier General Thomas A. Smyth was mortally wounded nearby (the last Union general killed in the war), and Colonel (Brevet Brigadier General) John Irvin Gregg was captured north of Farmville.

=== Appomattox Station (April 8) ===
The cavalry division of Brigadier General (Brevet Major General) George Armstrong Custer seized a supply train and 25 guns, effectively blocking Lee's path because Appomattox Station is to the west of Appomattox Court House. This unusual action pitted artillery without infantry support against cavalry. Custer captured and burned three trains loaded with provisions for Lee's army. Grant sent a letter to Lee offering generous surrender terms, as urged by President Abraham Lincoln, and proposing a meeting to discuss them.

With rations and supplies destroyed, Lee's last hope was to outmarch the Union pursuers to Lynchburg where there were more rations and supplies. Some food was still available in the remaining wagons and it was distributed to the units as they arrived in the vicinity of Appomattox Court House, Walker's artillery first, then Gordon's infantry, and the rest of the army.

=== Appomattox Court House (April 9) ===
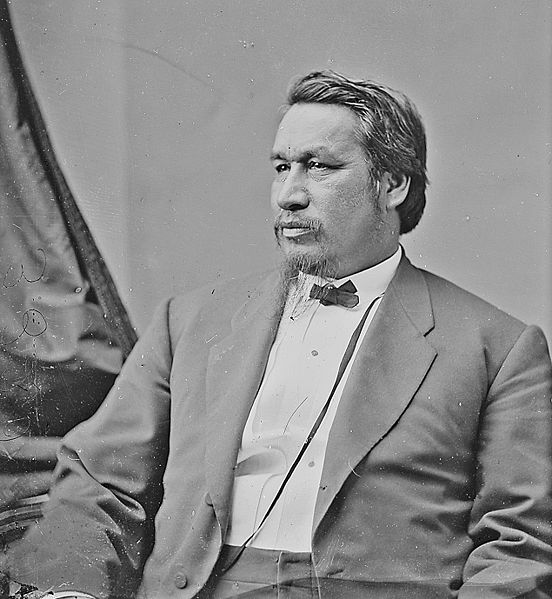
Colonel Ely S. Parker

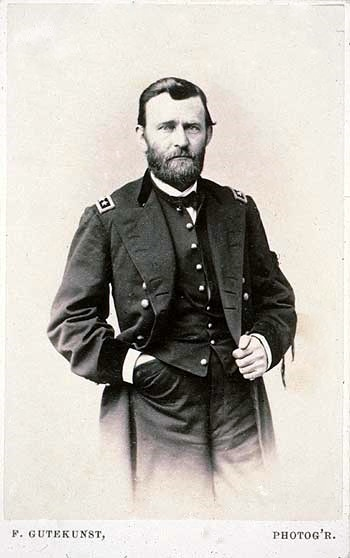
Lieutenant General Ulysses S. Grant

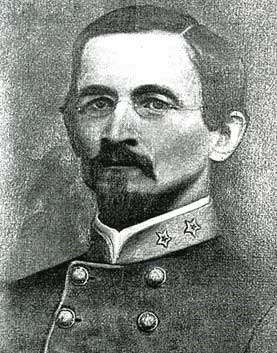
Colonel Charles Marshall

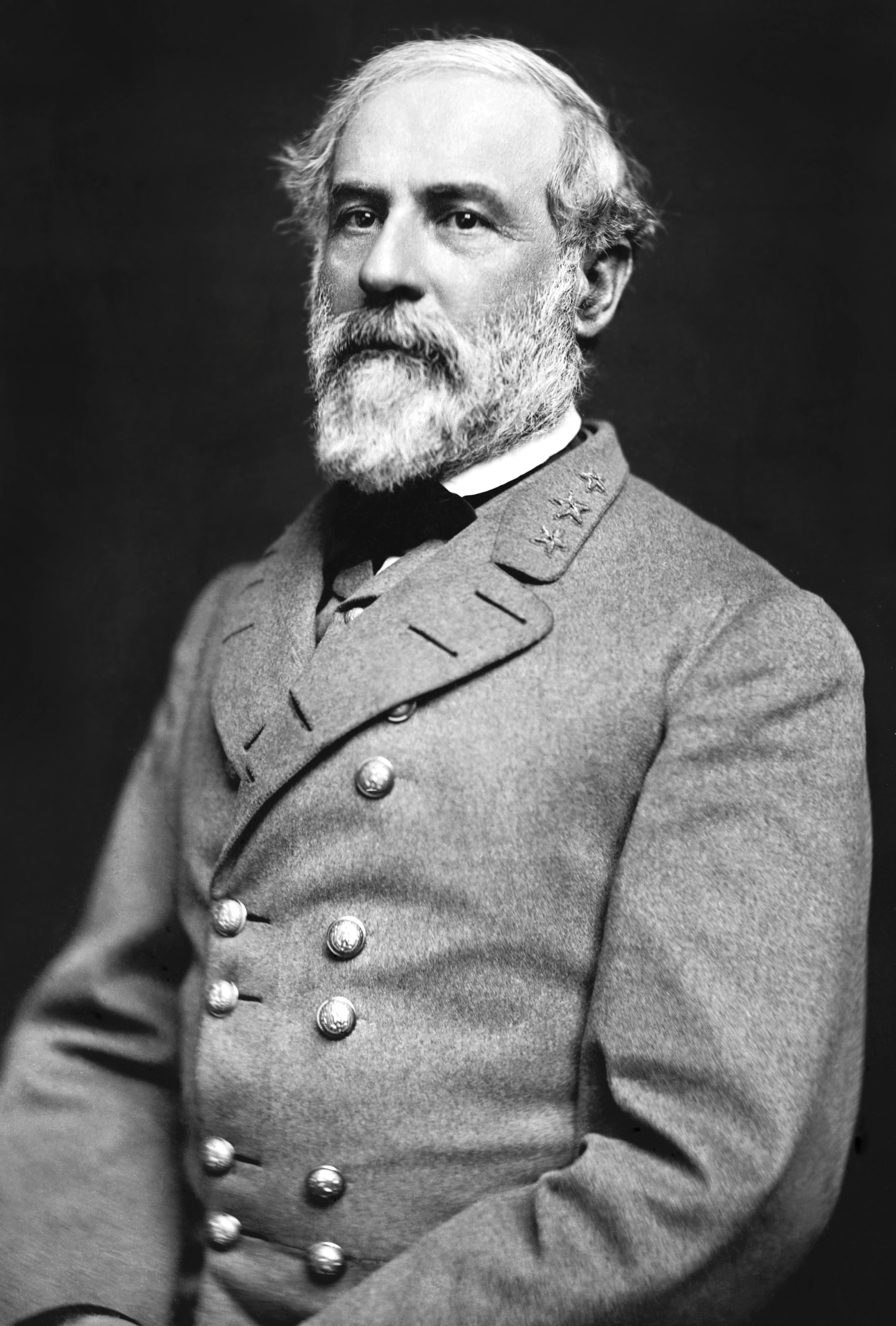
General Robert E. Lee

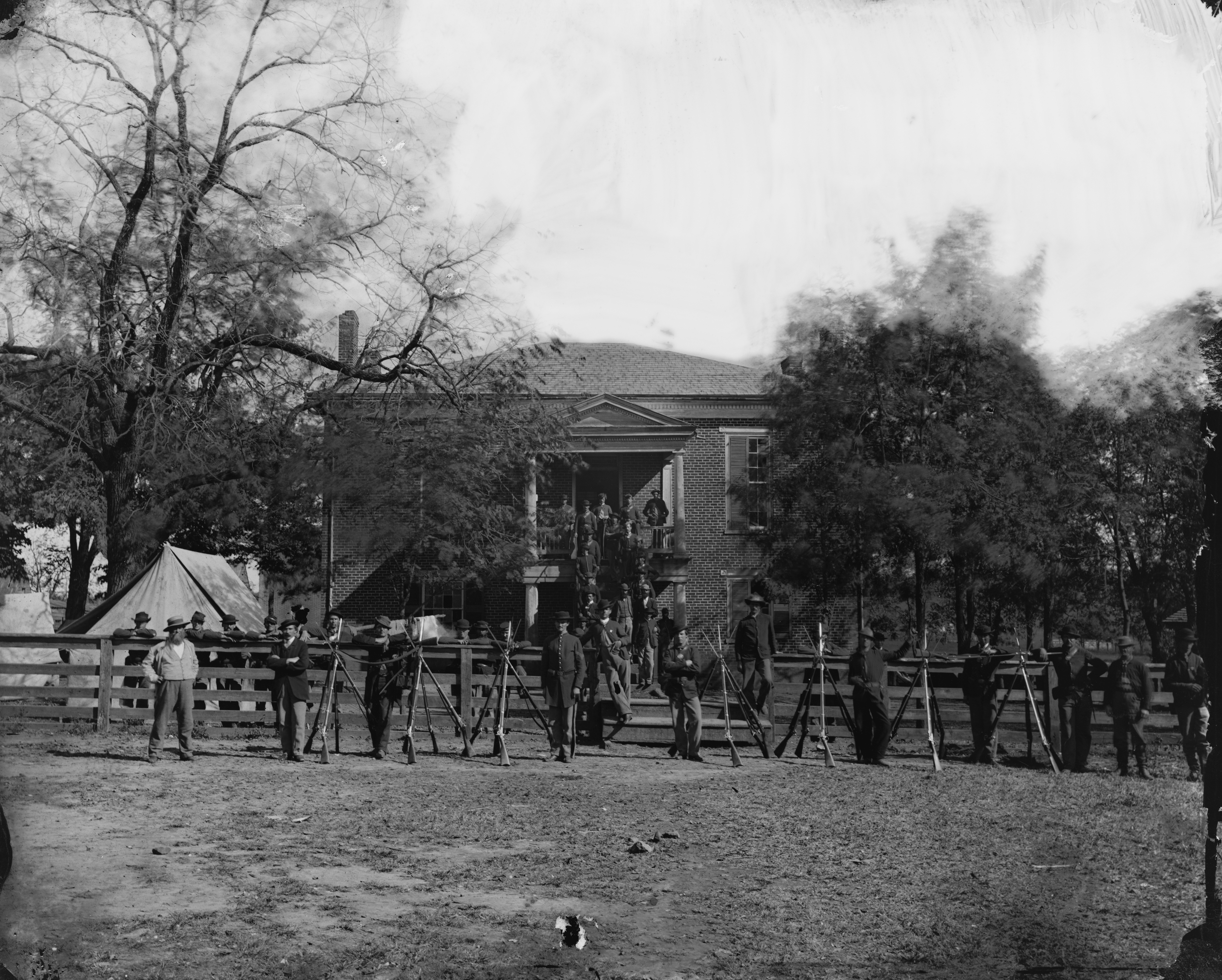
Union soldiers at the courthouse in April 1865.

At dawn on April 9, 1865, the Confederate Second Corps under Major General John B. Gordon attacked units of Major General Philip Sheridan's cavalry. Ahead of Gordon's corps was Major General Fitzhugh Lee's cavalry, which quickly forced back the first line under Colonel (Brevet Brigadier General) Charles H. Smith. The next line, held by Major General George Crook's division of the Army of the Potomac and Brigadier General Ranald S. Mackenzie's smaller division from the Army of the James, slowed the Confederate advance. Gordon's troops charged through the Union lines and took the ridge, but as they reached the crest they saw the entire Union XXIV Corps in line of battle with the Union V Corps to their right. Lee's outnumbered army was now surrounded on three sides. Lee's cavalry saw these Union forces and immediately withdrew by the left flank to the Richmond-Lynchburg Stage Road and rode off unhindered towards Lynchburg.

Ord's troops began advancing against Gordon's corps while the Union II Corps began moving against Lieutenant General James Longstreet's corps to the northeast. The 11th Maine Infantry Regiment was cut off from the rest of Brigadier General Robert S. Foster's division and suffered significant casualties in this final fight. Colonel Charles Venable of Lee's staff rode in at this time and asked Gordon for an assessment. Gordon gave him a reply he knew Lee did not want to hear: "Tell General Lee I have fought my corps to a frazzle, and I fear I can do nothing unless I am heavily supported by Longstreet's corps." Upon hearing it and considering the position of the armies, Lee finally stated the inevitable: "Then there is nothing left for me to do but to go and see General Grant and I would rather die a thousand deaths." Lee surrendered his army at 3 p.m., accepting the terms Grant had proposed by letter the previous day. He was accompanied to the McLean House where the surrender occurred only by his aide Colonel Charles Marshall and their orderly, Private Joshua O. Johns.

Grant offered the same terms he had offered the day before:

In accordance with the substance of my letter to you of the 8th inst., I propose to receive the surrender of the Army of N. Va. on the following terms, to wit: Rolls of all the officers and men to be made in duplicate. One copy to be given to an officer designated by me, the other to be retained by such officer or officers as you may designate. The officers to give their individual paroles not to take up arms against the Government of the United States until properly exchanged, and each company or regimental commander sign a like parole for the men of their commands. The arms, artillery and public property to be parked and stacked, and turned over to the officer appointed by me to receive them. This will not embrace the side-arms of the officers, nor their private horses or baggage. This done, each officer and man will be allowed to return to their homes, not to be disturbed by United States authority so long as they observe their paroles and the laws in force where they may reside.

The terms were as generous as Lee could hope for; his men would not be imprisoned or prosecuted for treason. Officers were allowed to keep their sidearms. In addition to his terms, Grant also allowed the defeated men to take home their horses and mules to carry out the spring planting and provided Lee with a supply of food rations for his starving army; Lee said it would have a very happy effect among the men and do much toward reconciling the country. The terms of the surrender were recorded in a document hand written by Grant's adjutant Ely S. Parker, a Native American of the Seneca tribe, and completed around 4 p.m., April 9. (Note: Davis, Burke, 1981, p. 387; Calkins, 1997, p. 175, states Lee and Marshall left the McLean House "some time after 3:00 in the afternoon."; Eicher, The Longest Night, 2001, p. 819, states "the surrender interview lasted until about 3:45 p.m.")

== Aftermath ==
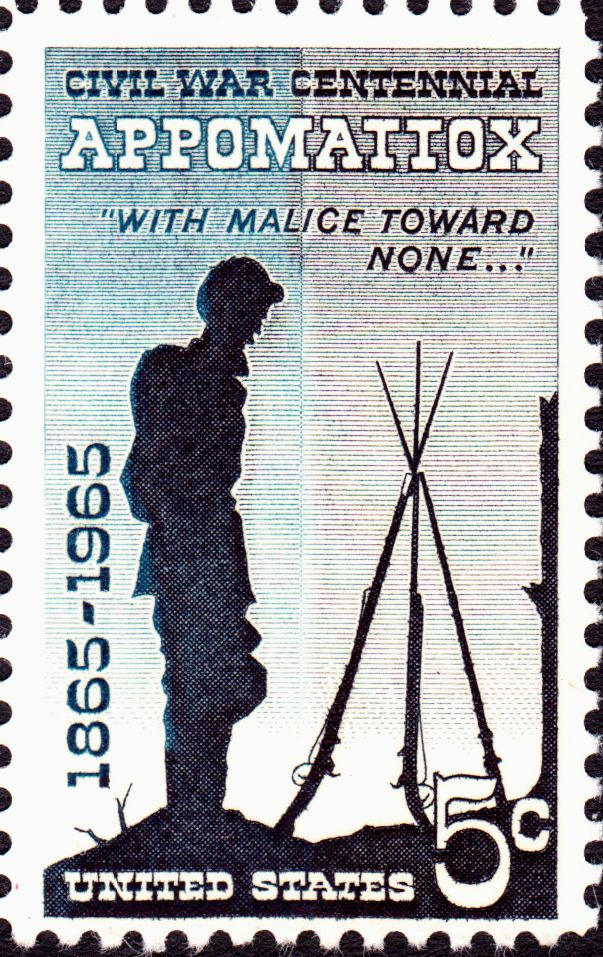
Appomattox Centennial, 1965 issue.

The Appomattox campaign was an example of masterful, relentless pursuit and maneuver by Grant and Sheridan, skills that had been in short supply by previous generals, such as Meade after Gettysburg and McClellan after Antietam. Lee did the best he could under the circumstances, but his supplies, soldiers, and luck finally ran out. The surrender of Lee represented the loss of only one of the Confederate field armies, but it was a psychological blow from which the South did not recover. With no chance remaining for eventual victory, all of the remaining armies capitulated by June 1865.

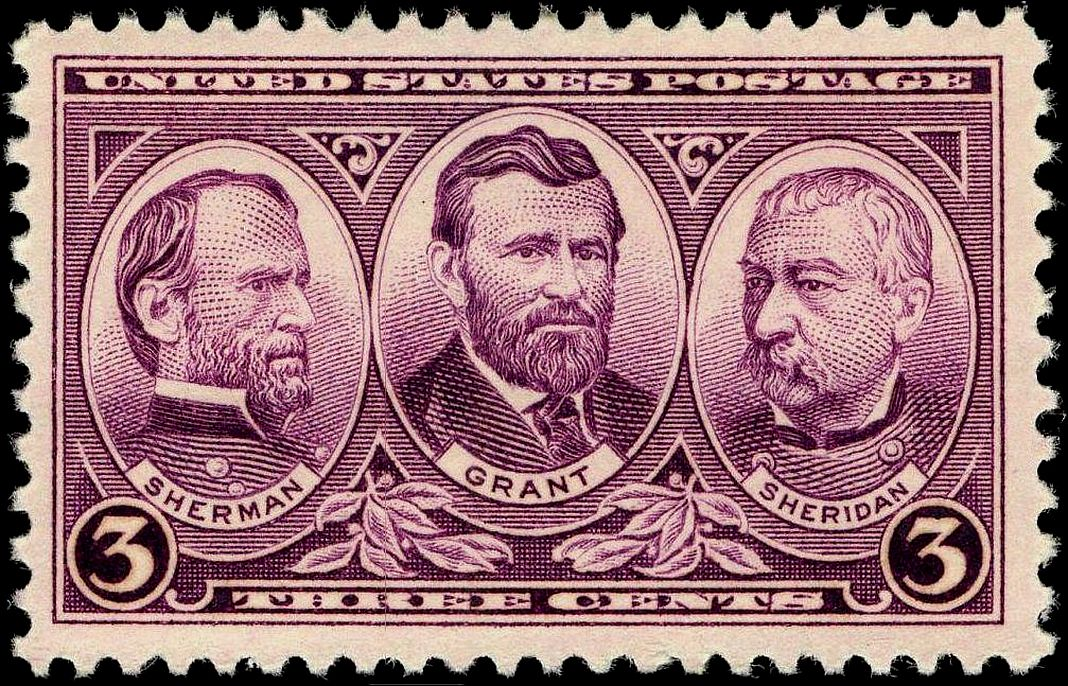
Generals Sherman, Grant and Sheridan, 1937 Issue

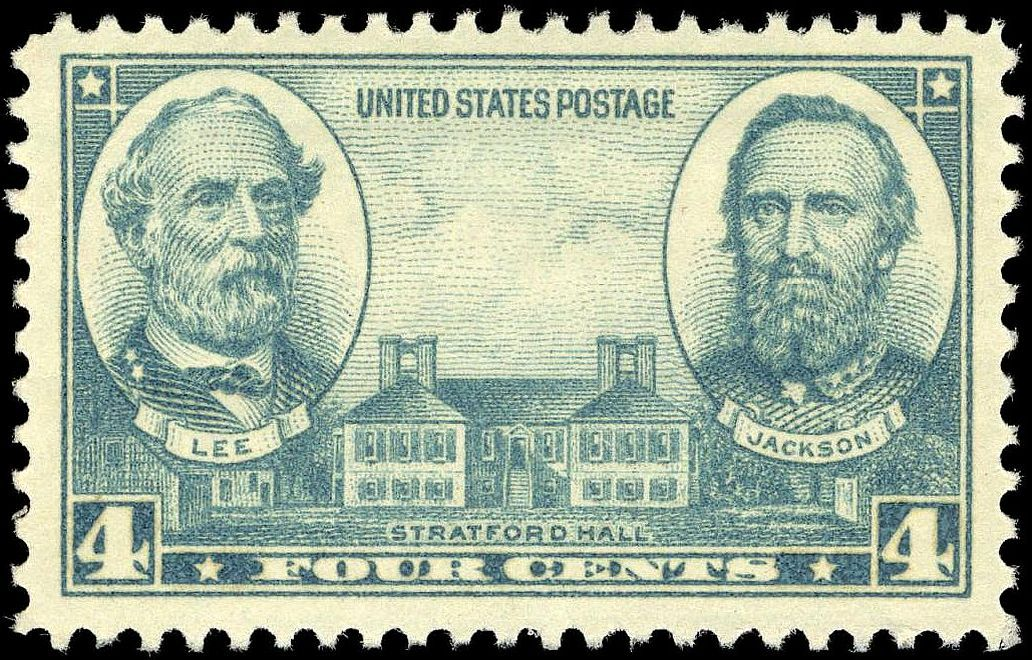
Generals Lee and Jackson, 1937 Issue.

Confederate casualties in the campaign are difficult to estimate because many of their records are lost and reports were not always submitted. National Park Service historian Chris M. Calkins estimates 6,266 killed and wounded, 19,132 captured; surrendering at Appomattox Court House were 22,349 infantry, 1,559 cavalry, and 2,576 artillery troops. William Marvel has written that many of the Confederate veterans bemoaned that there were only "8,000 muskets" available at the end against the enormous Union Army, but this figure deliberately ignores cavalry and artillery strength and is much lower than the total number of men who received certificates of parole. Many men who had slipped away from the army during the retreat later returned to receive the official Federal paperwork allowing them to return to their homes unmolested. Union casualties for the campaign were about 9,700 killed, wounded, and missing or captured.

== Classifying the campaigns ==
Military historians do not agree on precise boundaries between the campaigns of this era. This article uses the classification maintained by the U.S. National Park Service's American Battlefield Protection Program. (Note: NPS campaigns. The references by Kennedy and Salmon also use this classification. The Calkins reference uses it for the Appomattox campaign. Other references typically do not explicitly establish precise dates.)

An alternative classification is maintained by West Point; in their Atlas of American Wars (Esposito, 1959), the siege of Petersburg ends with the Union assault and breakthrough of April 2. The remainder of the war in Virginia is classified as "Grant's Pursuit of Lee to Appomattox Court House (3–9 April 1865)".

Bryce A. Suderow, in his introduction to Chapter 5 of Ed Bearss's 2014 edition of Volume II of The Petersburg Campaign: The Western Front Battles, September 1864 – April 1865, says the Battle of Lewis's Farm should be considered "the first battle of what should be viewed as the Five Forks Campaign."

== See also ==
- Armies in the American Civil War
- Commemoration of the American Civil War
- Commemoration of the American Civil War on postage stamps
- Conclusion of the American Civil War
- List of costliest American Civil War land battles
- Siege of Petersburg
- Troop engagements of the American Civil War, 1865

== Bibliography ==
- Bearss, Edwin C., with Bryce A. Suderow. The Petersburg Campaign. Vol. 2, The Western Front Battles, September 1864 – April 1865. El Dorado Hills, CA: Savas Beatie, 2014. ISBN 978-1-61121-104-7.
- Beringer, Richard E., Herman Hattaway, Archer Jones, and William N. Still, Jr. Why the South Lost the Civil War. Athens: University of Georgia Press, 1986. ISBN 978-0-8203-0815-9.
- Calkins, Chris. The Appomattox Campaign, March 29 – April 9, 1865. Conshohocken, PA: Combined Books, 1997. ISBN 978-0-938289-54-8.
- Davis, Burke. To Appomattox: Nine April Days, 1865. New York: Eastern Acorn Press reprint, 1981. ISBN 978-0-915992-17-1. First published New York: Rinehart, 1959.
- Davis, William C. An Honorable Defeat: The Last Days of the Confederate Government. New York: Harcourt, Inc., 2001. ISBN 978-0-15-100564-2.
- Eicher, David J. The Longest Night: A Military History of the Civil War. New York: Simon & Schuster, 2001. ISBN 978-0-684-84944-7.
- Eicher, John H., and David J. Eicher, Civil War High Commands. Stanford: Stanford University Press, 2001. ISBN 978-0-8047-3641-1.
- Esposito, Vincent J. (1959). West Point Atlas of American Wars. Vol. 1: 1689–1900 (1st ed.). New York: Frederick A. Praeger Publishers. OCLC 5890637.
- Foote, Shelby. The Civil War: A Narrative. Vol. 3, Red River to Appomattox. New York: Random House, 1974. ISBN 978-0-394-74622-7.
- Greene, A. Wilson. The Final Battles of the Petersburg Campaign: Breaking the Backbone of the Rebellion. Knoxville: University of Tennessee Press, 2008. ISBN 978-1-57233-610-0.
- Harris, William C. Lincoln's Last Months. Cambridge, MA: Belknap Press, 2004. ISBN 978-0-674-01199-1. p. 197.
- Hattaway, Herman, and Archer Jones. How the North Won: A Military History of the Civil War. Urbana: University of Illinois Press, 1983. ISBN 978-0-252-00918-1.
- Hess, Earl J. In the Trenches at Petersburg: Field Fortifications & Confederate Defeat. Chapel Hill: University of North Carolina Press, 2009. ISBN 978-0-8078-3282-0.
- Horn, John. The Petersburg Campaign: June 1864 – April 1865. Conshohocken, PA: Combined Publishing, 1999. ISBN 978-0-938289-28-9. p. 220.
- Kennedy, Frances H., ed. The Civil War Battlefield Guide. 2nd ed. Boston: Houghton Mifflin Co., 1998. ISBN 978-0-395-74012-5.
- Kinzer, Charles E. "Amelia Court House/Jetersville (3–5 April 1865)." In Encyclopedia of the American Civil War: A Political, Social, and Military History, edited by David S. Heidler and Jeanne T. Heidler. New York: W. W. Norton & Company, 2000. ISBN 978-0-393-04758-5. pp. 36–37.
- Long, E. B. The Civil War Day by Day: An Almanac, 1861–1865. Garden City, NY: Doubleday, 1971. OCLC 68283123.
- Longacre, Edward G. The Cavalry at Appomattox: A Tactical Study of Mounted Operations During the Civil War's Climactic Campaign, March 27 – April 9, 1865. Mechanicsburg, PA: Stackpole Books, 2003. ISBN 978-0-8117-0051-1.
- Longacre, Edward G. Lee's Cavalrymen: A History of the Mounted Forces of the Army of Northern Virginia. Mechanicsburg, PA: Stackpole Books, 2002. ISBN 978-0-8117-0898-2.
- Marvel, William. Lee's Last Retreat: The Flight to Appomattox. Chapel Hill: University of North Carolina Press, 2002. ISBN 978-0-8078-5703-8.
- McPherson, James M. Battle Cry of Freedom: The Civil War Era. Oxford History of the United States. New York: Oxford University Press, 1988. ISBN 978-0-19-503863-7.
- National Park Service Civil War Battle Summaries by Campaign (Eastern Theater) Archived April 9, 2005, at the Wayback Machine
- Salmon, John S. The Official Virginia Civil War Battlefield Guide. Mechanicsburg, PA: Stackpole Books, 2001. ISBN 978-0-8117-2868-3.
- Sommers, Richard J. Richmond Redeemed: The Siege at Petersburg. Garden City, NY: Doubleday, 1981. ISBN 978-0-385-15626-4.
- Starr, Steven. The Union Cavalry in the Civil War: The War in the East from Gettysburg to Appomattox, 1863–1865. Volume 2. Baton Rouge: Louisiana State University Press, 2007. Originally published 1981. ISBN 9780807132920.
- Stoker, Donald. The Grand Design: Strategy and the U.S. Civil War. Oxford and New York: Oxford University Press, 2010. ISBN 978-0-19-537-305-9.
- Trudeau, Noah Andre. The Last Citadel: Petersburg, Virginia, June 1864 – April 1865. Baton Rouge: Louisiana State University Press, 1991. ISBN 978-0-8071-1861-0.
- Trulock, Alice Rains. In the Hands of Providence: Joshua L. Chamberlain and the American Civil War. Chapel Hill: University of North Carolina Press, 1992. ISBN 978-0-8078-2020-9.
- Urwin, Gregory J. "Battle of Namozine Church." In Encyclopedia of the American Civil War: A Political, Social, and Military History, edited by David S. Heidler and Jeanne T. Heidler. New York: W. W. Norton & Company, 2000. ISBN 978-0-393-04758-5.
- Weigley, Russell F. A Great Civil War: A Military and Political History, 1861–1865. Bloomington and Indianapolis: Indiana University Press, 2000. ISBN 978-0-253-33738-2.
- Winik, Jay. April 1865: The Month That Saved America. New York: HarperCollins, 2006. ISBN 978-0-06-089968-4. First published 2001.

=== Memoirs and primary sources ===
- Grant, Ulysses S. Personal Memoirs of U. S. Grant. 2 vols. Charles L. Webster & Company, 1885–86. ISBN 0-914427-67-9.
- Sheridan, Philip H. Personal Memoirs of P. H. Sheridan. 2 vols. New York: Charles L. Webster & Co., 1888. ISBN 1-58218-185-3.
- U.S. War Department, The War of the Rebellion: a Compilation of the Official Records of the Union and Confederate Armies. Washington, DC: U.S. Government Printing Office, 1880–1901.
