= Third Battle of Petersburg =

Battle of the American Civil War

Third Battle of Petersburg (Breakthrough at Petersburg)
- Part of the American Civil War
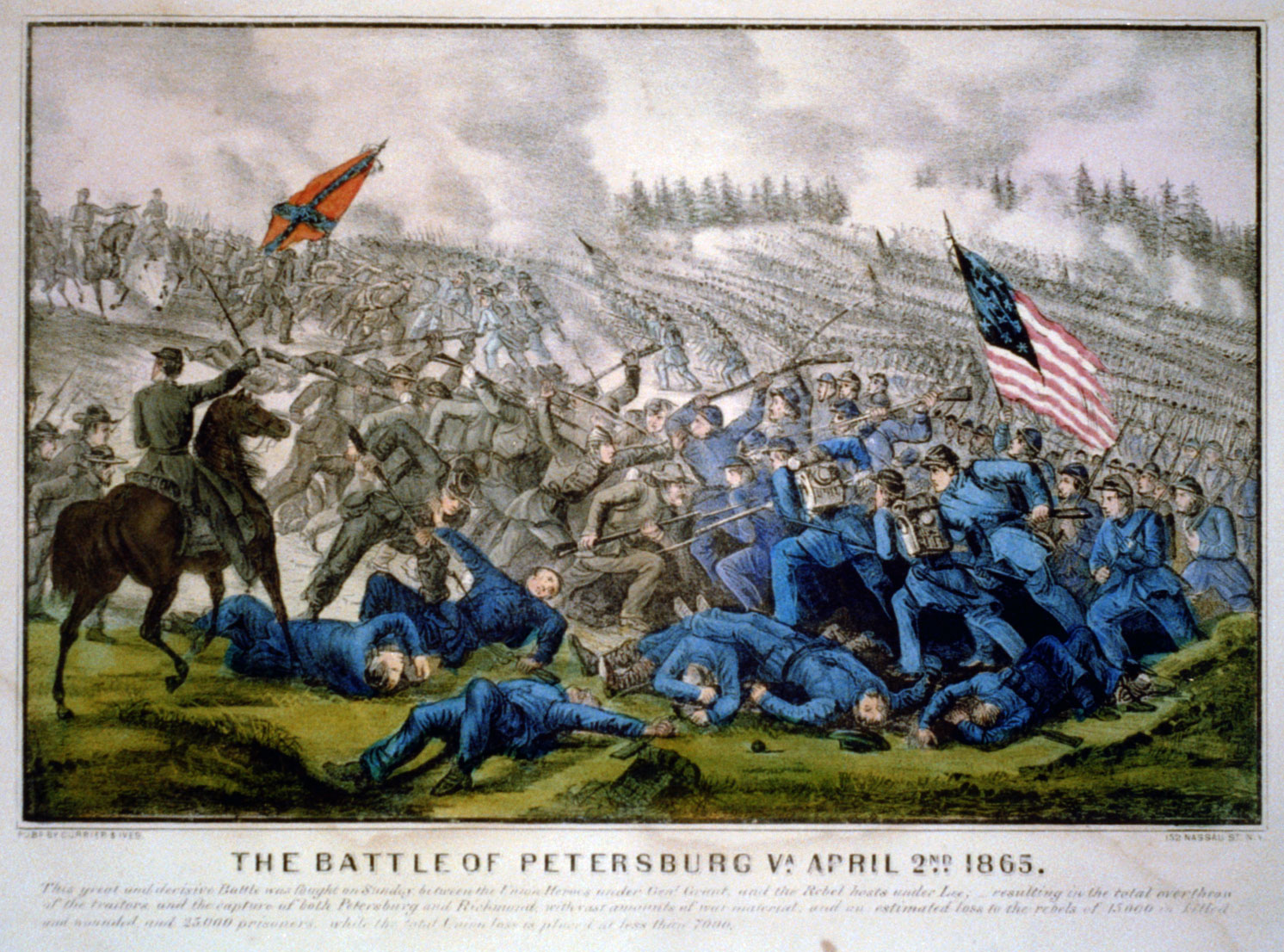
- The battle of Petersburg Va. April 2nd 1865, lithograph by Currier and Ives
Date	April 2, 1865
Location	Dinwiddie County, near Petersburg, Virginia 37.1776°N 77.4774°W
Result	Union victory: End of the Siege of Petersburg and opening of the Appomattox Campaign
Territorial changes	Richmond and Petersburg fall to Union forces on April 3, 1865

Belligerents
United States	(Confederate States of America) Confederate States

Commanders and leaders
Ulysses S. Grant; George Meade; Horatio Wright; Edward Ord	Robert E. Lee; A. P. Hill †

Strength
114,335; ~ 63,000 (engaged) (Note: Long, E. B. The Civil War Day by Day: An Almanac, 1861–1865. Garden City, NY: Doubleday, 1971. OCLC 68283123. Page 663 gives the number of Union troops engaged as 63,000. Sheridan's task force, including the cavalry and the V Corps took no significant part in the actions on April 2. Hess, Earl J. In the Trenches at Petersburg: Field Fortifications & Confederate Defeat. Chapel Hill: University of North Carolina Press, 2009. ISBN 978-0-8078-3282-0. p. 278.)	40–45,000; 18–20,000 (engaged) (Note: Calkins, Chris. The Appomattox Campaign, March 29 – April 9, 1865. Conshohocken, PA: Combined Books, 1997. ISBN 978-0-938-28954-8. p. 63 gives Lee's strength at the beginning of the Appomattox Campaign as 55,000–58,000 effectives, which would include the defenders of Richmond and Pickett's task force of 10,600 men sent to Five Forks. Clearly the 58,400 figure as the strength of the Confederate Army at Third Battle of Petersburg given by the CWSAC is far too high. Long, E. B., 1971, p. 663 states possibly 18,500 Confederates were engaged in the fighting in that battle.)

Casualties and losses
3,936	5,000+

The Third Battle of Petersburg, also known as the Breakthrough at Petersburg or the Fall of Petersburg, was fought on April 2, 1865, south and southwest Virginia in the area of Petersburg, Virginia, at the end of the 292-day Richmond–Petersburg Campaign (sometimes called the Siege of Petersburg) and in the beginning stage of the Appomattox Campaign near the conclusion of the American Civil War. The Union Army (Army of the Potomac, Army of the Shenandoah and Army of the James) under the overall command of General-in-Chief Lieutenant General Ulysses S. Grant, launched an assault on General Robert E. Lee's Confederate Army of Northern Virginia's Petersburg, Virginia, trenches and fortifications after the Union victory at the Battle of Five Forks on April 1, 1865. As a result of that battle the Confederate right flank and rear were exposed. The remaining supply lines were cut and the Confederate defenders were reduced by over 10,000 men killed, wounded, taken prisoner or in flight.

The thinly held Confederate lines at Petersburg had been stretched to the breaking point by earlier Union movements that extended those lines beyond the ability of the Confederates to man them adequately and by desertions and casualties from recent battles. As the much larger Union forces assaulted the lines, desperate Confederate defenders held off the Union breakthrough long enough for Confederate government officials and most of the remaining Confederate army, including local defense forces and some Confederate Navy personnel, to flee Petersburg and the Confederate capital of Richmond, Virginia, during the night of April 2–3. Confederate corps commander Lieutenant General A.P. Hill was killed during the fighting.

Union soldiers occupied Richmond and Petersburg on April 3, 1865, but most of the Union Army pursued the Army of Northern Virginia until they surrounded it, forcing Robert E. Lee to surrender that army on April 9, 1865, after the Battle of Appomattox Court House, Virginia.

== Background ==
=== Siege of Petersburg ===
The 292-day Richmond–Petersburg Campaign (Siege of Petersburg) began when two corps of the Union Army of the Potomac, which were unobserved when leaving Cold Harbor at the end of the Overland Campaign, combined with the Union Army of the James outside Petersburg, but failed to seize the city from a small force of Confederate defenders at the Second Battle of Petersburg on June 15–18, 1864. Union General-in-Chief Ulysses S. Grant then had to conduct a campaign of trench warfare and attrition in which the Union forces tried to wear down the smaller Confederate Army, destroy or cut off sources of supply and supply lines to Petersburg and Richmond and extend the defensive lines which the outnumbered and declining Confederate force had to defend to the breaking point. The Confederates were able to defend Richmond and the important railroad and supply center of Petersburg, Virginia, 23 miles (37 km) south of Richmond for over nine months against a larger force by adopting a defensive strategy and skillfully using trenches and field fortifications.

After the Battle of Hatcher's Run on February 5–7, 1865, extended the lines another 4 miles (6.4 km), Lee had few reserves after manning the lengthened defenses. Lee knew that his forces could not sustain the defenses much longer and the best chance to continue the war was for part or all of his army to leave the Richmond and Petersburg lines, obtain food and supplies at Danville, Virginia, or possibly Lynchburg, Virginia, and join General Joseph E. Johnston's force opposing Major General William T. Sherman's army in North Carolina. If the Confederates could quickly defeat Sherman, they might turn back to oppose Grant before he could combine his forces with Sherman's. Lee began preparations for the movement and informed Confederate President Jefferson Davis and Confederate States Secretary of War John C. Breckinridge of his conclusions and plan.

Under pressure from President Jefferson Davis to maintain the defenses of Richmond and unable to move effectively over muddy roads with poorly fed animals in winter in any event, General Lee accepted a plan by Major General John B. Gordon to launch an attack on Union Fort Stedman designed to break Union lines east of Petersburg or at least compel Grant to shorten the Union Army lines. If this were to be accomplished, Lee would have a better chance to shorten the Confederate lines and send a substantial force, or nearly his whole army, to help Joe Johnston.

Gordon's surprise attack on Fort Stedman in the pre-dawn hours of March 25, 1865, captured the fort, three adjacent batteries and over 500 prisoners while killing and wounding about 500 more Union soldiers. The Union IX Corps under Major General John G. Parke promptly counterattacked. The IX Corps recaptured the fort and batteries, forced the Confederates to return to their lines and in places to give up their advance picket line. The IX Corps inflicted about 4,000 casualties, including about 1,000 captured, whom the Confederates could ill afford to lose.

On the afternoon of March 25, 1865, at the Battle of Jones's Farm, the II Corps and VI Corps captured Confederate picket lines near Armstrong's Mill which extended the left end of the Union line about 0.25 miles (0.40 km) closer to the Confederate fortifications. This put the VI Corps within about 0.5 miles (0.80 km) of the Confederate line. After the Confederate defeats at Fort Stedman and Jones's Farm, Lee knew that Grant soon would move against the only remaining Confederate supply lines to Petersburg, the South Side Railroad and the Boydton Plank Road, and possibly cut off all routes of retreat from Richmond and Petersburg.

== Beginning of Appomattox Campaign ==
=== Grant's orders ===
On March 24, 1865, the day before the Confederate attack on Fort Stedman, Grant already planned for an offensive to begin March 29, 1865. The objectives were to draw the Confederates out into an open battle where they might be defeated and, if the Confederates held their lines, to cut the remaining road and railroad supply and communication routes between areas of the Confederacy still under Confederate control and Petersburg and Richmond. The Battle of Fort Stedman had no effect on Grant's plans. The Union Army lost no ground due to the attack, did not need to contract their lines and suffered casualties that were only a small percentage of their force.

Grant ordered Major General Edward Ord to move part of the Army of the James from the lines near Richmond to fill in the line to be vacated by the II Corps under Major General Andrew A. Humphreys at the southwest end of the Petersburg line before that corps moved to the west. This freed two corps of Major General George Meade's Army of the Potomac for offensive action against Lee's flank and railroad supply lines: Major General Andrew A. Humphrey's II Corps and the V Corps commanded by Major General Gouverneur K. Warren. Grant ordered the two infantry corps, along with Major General Philip Sheridan's cavalry corps, still designated the Army of the Shenandoah under Sheridan's command, to move west. Sheridan's cavalry consisted of two divisions commanded by Brigadier General Thomas Devin and Brigadier General (Brevet Major General) George Armstrong Custer but under the overall command of Brigadier General (Brevet Major General) Wesley Merritt, as an unofficial corps commander, and the division of Major General George Crook detached from the Army of the Potomac. Grant's objectives remained the same although he thought it unlikely the Confederates would be drawn into open battle.

=== Lee's orders ===
Confederate General-in-chief Robert E. Lee, who was already concerned about the ability of his weakening army to maintain the defense of Petersburg and Richmond, realized that the Confederate defeat at Fort Stedman would encourage Grant to make a move against his right flank and communication and transportation routes. On the morning of March 29, 1865, Lee prepared to send some reinforcements to the western end of his line and began to form a mobile force of about 10,600 infantry, cavalry and artillery under the command of Major General George Pickett and cavalry commander Major General Fitzhugh Lee. This force would go beyond the end of the line to protect the key junction at Five Forks in Dinwiddie County from which a Union force could access the remaining open Confederate roads and railroads.

=== Union troop movements ===
Before dawn on March 29, 1865, Warren's V Corps moved west of the Union and Confederate lines while Sheridan's cavalry took a longer, more southerly route toward Dinwiddie Court House. Humphrey's II Corps filled the gap between the existing end of the Union line and the new position of Warren's corps. Warren's corps led by Brigadier General Joshua Chamberlain's First Brigade of Brigadier General (Brevet Major General) Charles Griffin's First Division of the V Corps proceeded north on the Quaker Road toward its intersection with the Boydton Plank Road and the Confederates' nearby White Oak Road Line.

=== Battle of Lewis's Farm ===
Along Quaker Road, across Rowanty Creek at the Lewis Farm, Chamberlain's men encountered brigades of Confederate Brigadier Generals Henry A. Wise, William Henry Wallace and Young Marshall Moody which had been sent by Fourth Corps commander Lieutenant General Richard H. Anderson and his only present division commander, Major General Bushrod Johnson, to turn back the Union advance. (Note: Major General Robert F. Hoke's division first was sent to the Richmond defenses under the command of Lieutenant General James Longstreet. On December 22, 1864, the division was sent to help defend Wilimington, North Carolina. Greene, 2008, pp. 15, 21.) A back-and-forth battle ensued during which Chamberlain was wounded and almost captured. Chamberlain's brigade, reinforced by a four-gun artillery battery and regiments from the brigades of Colonel (Brevet Brigadier General) Edgar M. Gregory and Colonel (Brevet Brigadier General) Alfred L. Pearson, who was later awarded the Medal of Honor, drove the Confederates back to their White Oak Road Line. Casualties for both sides were nearly even at 381 for the Union and 371 for the Confederates.

After the battle, Griffin's division moved up to occupy the junction of the Quaker Road and Boydton Plank Road near the end of the Confederate White Oak Road Line. Late in the afternoon of March 29, 1865, Sheridan's cavalry occupied Dinwiddie Court House on the Boydton Plank Road without opposition. The Union forces had cut the Boydton Plank Road in two places and were close to the Confederate line and in a strong position to move a large force against both the Confederate right flank and the crucial road junction at Five Forks in Dinwiddie County to which Lee was just sending Pickett's mobile force defenders. The Union Army was nearly in position to attack the two remaining Confederate railroad connections with Petersburg and Richmond, if they could take Five Forks.

Encouraged by the Confederate failure to press their attack at Lewis's Farm and their withdrawal to their White Oak Road Line, Grant decided to expand Sheridan's mission to a major offensive rather than just a possible battle or a railroad raid and forced extension of the Confederate line.

=== Battle of White Oak Road ===
On the morning of March 31, General Lee inspected his White Oak Road Line and learned that the Union left flank held by Brigadier General Romeyn B. Ayres's division had moved forward the previous day and was "in the air." A wide gap also existed between the Union infantry and Sheridan's nearest cavalry units near Dinwiddie Court House. Lee ordered Major General Bushrod Johnson to have his remaining brigades under Brigadier General Henry A. Wise and Colonel Martin L. Stansel in lieu of the ill Young Marshall Moody, reinforced by the brigades of Brigadier Generals Samuel McGowan and Eppa Hunton, attack the exposed Union line.

Stansel's, McGowan's and Hunton's brigades attacked both most of Ayres's division and all of Crawford's division which quickly had joined the fight as it erupted. In this initial encounter, two Union divisions of over 5,000 men were thrown back across Gravelly Run by three Confederate brigades. Brigadier General (Brevet Major General) Charles Griffin's division and the V Corps artillery under Colonel (Brevet Brigadier General) Charles S. Wainwright finally stopped the Confederate advance short of crossing Gravelly Run. Adjacent to the V Corps, Major General Andrew A. Humphreys conducted diversionary demonstrations and sent two of Brigadier General (Brevet Major General) Nelson Miles's brigades from his II Corps forward. They initially surprised and, after a sharp fight, drove back Wise's brigade on the left of the Confederate line, taking about 100 prisoners.

At 2:30 p.m., Brigadier General Joshua Chamberlain's men forded the cold, swollen Gravelly Run, followed by the rest of Griffin's division and then the rest of Warren's reorganized corps. Under heavy fire, Chamberlain's brigade, along with Colonel (Brevet Brigadier General) Edgar M. Gregory's brigade, charged Hunton's brigade and drove Hunton's troops back to the White Oak Road Line, which allowed Chamberlain's and Gregory's men across White Oak Road. The remainder of the Confederate force then had to withdraw to avoid being outflanked and overwhelmed. Warren's corps ended the battle again across a section of White Oak Road between the end of the main Confederate line and Pickett's force at Five Forks, cutting the direct route of communications between Anderson's (Johnson's) and Pickett's forces. Union casualties (killed, wounded, missing – presumably mostly captured) were 1,407 from the V Corps and 461 from the II Corps and Confederate casualties have been estimated at about 800. (Note: Lowe, David W. White Oak Road in Kennedy, Frances H., ed., The Civil War Battlefield Guide, 2nd ed., Houghton Mifflin Co., 1998, ISBN 978-0-395-74012-5. p. 417. gives the casualties as Union 1,781 and Confederate as 900–1,235.)

=== Battle of Dinwiddie Court House ===
About 5:00 p.m. on March 29, 1865, Major General Philip Sheridan led two of his three divisions of Union cavalry, totaling about 9,000 men counting the trailing division, unopposed into Dinwiddie Court House, Virginia, about 4 miles (6.4 km) west of the end of the Confederate lines and about 6 miles (9.7 km) south of the important road junction at Five Forks. Sheridan planned to occupy Five Forks the next day. That night, under orders from General Robert E. Lee, Confederate Major General Fitzhugh Lee led his cavalry division from Sutherland's Station to Five Forks to defend against an anticipated Union drive to the South Side Railroad which could sever use of that important final Confederate railroad supply line to Petersburg. Fitzhugh Lee arrived at Five Forks with his division early on the morning of March 30 and headed toward Dinwiddie Court House.

On March 30, 1865, in driving rain, Sheridan sent Union cavalry patrols from Brigadier General Thomas Devin's division to seize Five Forks. Devin's force unexpectedly found and skirmished with units of Fitzhugh Lee's cavalry division. That night Confederate Major General George Pickett reached Five Forks with about 6,000 infantrymen in five brigades (under Brigadier Generals William R. Terry, Montgomery Corse, George H. Steuart, Matt Ransom and William Henry Wallace) and took overall command of the operation as ordered by General Lee. The cavalry divisions of Major Generals Thomas L. Rosser and W.H.F. "Rooney" Lee arrived at Five Forks late that night. Fitzhugh Lee took overall command of the cavalry and put Colonel Thomas T. Munford in charge of his own division.

The rain continued on March 31. Under Sheridan's direction, Brigadier General (Brevet Major General) Wesley Merritt sent two of Devin's brigades toward Five Forks and held one brigade in reserve at J. Boisseau's farm. Sheridan sent brigades or detachments from Major General George Crook's division to guard two fords of a swampy stream just to the west, Chamberlain's Bed, in order to protect the Union left flank from surprise attack and to guard the major roads. Dismounted Union troopers of Colonel (Brevet Brigadier General) Charles H. Smith's brigade armed with Spencer repeating carbines held up Fitzhugh Lee's cavalry attack at the southern ford, Fitzgerald's Ford. At about 2:00 p.m., Pickett's force crossed the northern ford, Danse's Ford, against a small force from Brigadier General Henry E. Davies's brigade, which was left to hold the ford while much of the brigade unnecessarily moved to help Smith and could not return fast enough to help the few remaining defenders against Pickett.

Union brigades and regiments fought a series of delaying actions throughout the day but were consistently eventually forced to withdraw toward Dinwiddie Court House. The brigades of Colonel (Brevet Brigadier General) Alfred Gibbs and Brigadier General John Irvin Gregg, later joined by Colonel Smith's brigade, held the junction of Adams Road and Brooks Road for two to three hours. Meanwhile, Sheridan had called up Brigadier General (Brevet Major General) George Armstrong Custer with two brigades of his division under Colonels Alexander C. M. Pennington, Jr. and Henry Capehart. Custer set up another defensive line about 0.75 miles (1.21 km) north of Dinwiddie Court House, which his brigades together with Smith's and Gibbs's brigades, used to hold off the attack by Pickett and Fitzhugh Lee until darkness ended the battle. Both armies initially stayed in position and close to each other after dark. The Confederates intended to resume the attack in the morning.

The Confederates did not report their casualties and losses. Historian A. Wilson Greene has written that the best estimate of Confederate casualties in the Dinwiddie Court House engagement is 360 cavalry, 400 infantry, 760 total killed and wounded. Union officers' reports showed that some Confederates also were taken prisoner. Sheridan suffered 40 killed, 254 wounded, 60 missing, total 354. (Note: Bearss, 2014, p. 404 states the Union loss was about 450 according to the Official Records of the War of the Rebellion. Longacre, 2003, p. 75 says Sheridan took "nearly 500" casualties.) Pickett lost Brigadier General William R. Terry to a disabling injury. Terry was replaced as brigade commander by Colonel Robert M. Mayo.

=== Battle of Five Forks ===
The decisive Battle of Five Forks was fought on April 1, 1865, southwest of Petersburg, Virginia, around the road junction of Five Forks in Dinwiddie County, Virginia. Five Forks was a critical crossroads that led to the remaining Confederate supply lines. Mobile task forces of combined infantry, artillery and cavalry from the Union Army under overall command of Major General Philip Sheridan with Major General Gouverneur K. Warren commanding the V Corps infantry defeated a Confederate Army of Northern Virginia combined task force commanded by Major General George E. Pickett and cavalry corps commander Fitzhugh Lee. The Union Army inflicted over 1,000 casualties on the Confederates and took at least 2,400 prisoners while seizing Five Forks, the key to control of the vital South Side Railroad. Union casualties were 103 killed, 670 wounded, 57 missing for a total of 830.

Because of the approach of V Corp infantry on the night of March 31, Pickett retreated about 6 miles (9.7 km) to a modestly fortified line about 1.75 miles (2.82 km) in length approximately half on either side of the junction of White Oak Road, Scott Road and Dinwiddie Court House Road (Ford's Road to the north) at Five Forks. Because of its strategic importance, General Robert E. Lee ordered Pickett to hold Five Forks at all hazards.

At Five Forks at the beginning of the Union attack about 1:00 p.m. on April 1, Sheridan's cavalry hit the front and right flank of the Confederate line with small arms fire from mostly dismounted cavalry troopers of Brigadier General Thomas Devin's and Brigadier General (Brevet Major General) George Armstrong Custer's divisions. They attacked from mostly positions sheltered by woods just outside the Confederate breastworks. This fire pinned down the Confederates while the massed V Corps of infantry organized to attack the Confederate left flank.

With Sheridan fretting about the amount of remaining daylight and his cavalry possibly running out of ammunition, the Union infantry forces attacked about 4:15 p.m. Pickett and Fitzhugh Lee were having a late shad bake lunch about 1.5 miles (2.4 km) north of the main Confederate line along White Oak Road because they thought Sheridan was unlikely to be organized for an attack that late in the day and that General Lee would send reinforcements if Union Army infantry moved against them. The intervening thick, damp woods and an acoustic shadow prevented the Confederate commanders from hearing the opening stage of the battle nearby. Pickett and Lee had not told any of the next ranking officers of their absence and that those subordinates were temporarily in charge. By the time Pickett got to the battlefield, his lines were collapsing beyond his ability to reorganize them.

Because of bad information and lack of reconnaissance, two of the Union divisions in the infantry attack did not hit the Confederate left flank, but their movement by chance helped them to roll up the Confederate line by coming at it from the end and rear. The first division in the attack under Brigadier General Romeyn B. Ayres alone overran the short right angled line on the left side of the Confederate main line. Sheridan's personal leadership helped encourage the men and focus them on their objective. Brigadier General Charles Griffin's division recovered from overshooting the Confederate left and helped roll up additional improvised Confederate defense lines. Brigadier General (Brevet Major General) Samuel W. Crawford's division swept across north of the main battle but then closed off Ford's Church Road, swept down to Five Forks and helped disperse the last line of Confederate infantry resistance. The Union cavalry was somewhat less successful. Although they pushed the Confederate cavalry back, most Confederate cavalrymen escaped while most of the Confederate infantry became casualties or prisoners.

Due to more apparent than real lack of speed, enthusiasm and leadership, as well as some past grudges and a personality conflict, after Warren had just personally led a final heroic charge to end the battle, Sheridan controversially relieved Warren of command of V Corps when the successful battle concluded. (Note: In 1883, the Warren Court of Inquiry decided that Sheridan had the authority to relieve Warren but should not have done so under the circumstances. Calkins, 1997, pp. 38–41.) The Union Army held Five Forks and the road to the South Side Railroad at the end of the battle.

== Prelude to battle ==
=== April 1: Lee's actions at Petersburg ===
On the morning of April 1, Robert E. Lee sent a letter to Jefferson Davis concerning the extension of the Union lines to Dinwiddie Court House, indicating that this cut off the route to Stony Creek depot where the cavalry's forage was delivered. Lee noted that Sheridan was in a position to sever the South Side Railroad and the Richmond and Danville Railroad and that consideration must be given to "evacuating their position on the James River at once." Lee immediately had seven artillery pieces moved from Richmond to Petersburg. In view of the situation, Lieutenant General A.P. Hill returned to duty from an uncompleted sick leave.

Confederate patrols confirmed that at least the XXIV Corps from the Army of the James was now in the Petersburg lines. On the morning of April 1, Lee also sent a telegram to Lieutenant General James Longstreet in charge of the Richmond lines suggesting that he could go over to the attack or send part of his corps to reinforce the Petersburg lines.

Lee then went to Lieutenant General Richard H. Anderson's command post at the end of the White Oak Road line and discovered that the Union force opposite that line had moved west toward Pickett's position. While at Anderson's headquarters, Lee received Longstreet's reply that he thought that troops should be sent to Petersburg because Union gunboats would likely stop any offensive that his force attempted to make.

After the battle on the night of April 1, Fitzhugh Lee informed Robert E. Lee of the defeat and rout at Five Forks from Church's Crossing near the Ford Road junction with the South Side Railroad where the remaining forces of Rooney Lee and Thomas Rosser joined him. Lee sent Anderson with Bushrod Johnson and his infantry to help Pickett reorganize and hold the South Side Railroad. Anderson left a small force behind to try to hold the line and departed from Burgess Mill to join Fitzhugh Lee at about 6:30 p.m. Anderson arrived about 2:00 a.m. on April 2. General Lee's intention in sending these reinforcements west was to defend the South Side Railroad at Sutherland's Station and to block the railroad as a line of approach to Petersburg. Anderson's force included three brigades of Major General Bushrod Johnson's division, Brigadier General Eppa Hunton's brigade of Pickett's command, and the survivors of Pickett's task force at Five Forks. The defenders remaining at the end of the White Oak Road Line between Claiborne Road and Burgess's Mill were the brigades of Brigadier Generals Samuel McGowan's, William MacRae's, Alfred M. Scales's and John R. Cooke's from A.P. Hill's corps.

Lee also ordered troops from Richmond to come to Petersburg to help defend against attacks which he thought to be imminent. Lee ordered Longstreet to move with Major General Charles W. Field's division to the Petersburg defenses. He also ordered Major General William Mahone to send Brigadier General Nathaniel Harris's brigade to Petersburg from the Bermuda Hundred line. (Note: Lieutenant General Richard S. Ewell with Major General George Washington Custis Lee's division, Major General Joseph B. Kershaw's division of Longstreet's corps and Brigadier General Martin Gary's cavalry brigade remained in the Richmond defenses.)

=== Porter reports victory; Grant orders general assault ===
When the Battle of Five Forks ended, Colonel Horace Porter, General Grant's aide and observer at the battle, started back for Grant's headquarters at about 7:30 p.m. He excitedly reported the victory and told Grant that over 5,000 prisoners were taken. The victory at Five Forks opened the road to the South Side Railroad for the Union force. As soon as Grant learned of the victory, at about 8:00 p.m., he ordered Major General Meade to have Major Generals Humphreys and Parke ready to push against the Confederate lines to keep the Confederates from escaping from Petersburg and converging on Sheridan's force. Grant told the officers at his headquarters that he had ordered a general assault along the lines.

Meade asked Grant for clarification because Grant previously had ordered a 4:00 a.m. attack all along the line. Grant said both Humphreys and Parke should feel for a chance to push on that night, that Humphreys should send skirmishers forward and attack if the Confederates were leaving their positions. If the Confederates held their line, Grant said that Humphreys should send Miles's division down White Oak Road to reinforce Sheridan. Miles's and Brigadier General (Brevet Major General) Gershom Mott's divisions from Humphreys corps attacked at once but could not do more than drive in the Confederate pickets as Confederate artillery opened up on them. Miles division was sent to Sheridan just before midnight but Mott's and Brigadier General William Hays's divisions continued probing the Confederate line.

Grant also directed that Major Generals Horatio Wright, John Parke and Edward Ord (John Gibbon) begin an artillery barrage on the Confederate lines. The division commanders and Ord reported to Grant that their men could not see the defenses well enough to attack that night.

=== Grant sends Miles's division to Sheridan; Sheridan's plan ===
On the night of April 1, two divisions of the Union V Corps camped across White Oak Road near Gravelly Run Church while the third division camped near Ford's Road. Sheridan's cavalry divisions camped at the Gilliam Farm near Five Forks while Brigadier General Ranald Mackenzie's cavalrymen, detached from the Army of the James for service with Sheridan, settled in near the Ford's Road crossing of Hatcher's Run. Nelson A. Miles's division of Andrew Humphrey's II Corps joined Sheridan later that night.

Grant sent a message to Sheridan late on April 1 that he was sending Miles's division to him and that he planned an attack along the Petersburg lines at 4:00 a.m. Grant said he could give Sheridan no specific instructions but "would like you however to get something done to the South Side Road even if they do not tear up a mile of it." Sheridan replied at 12:30 a.m. that he planned to sweep the White Oak Road and all north of it down to Petersburg. He sent no troops to the South Side Railroad but moved against the White Oak Road Line flank.

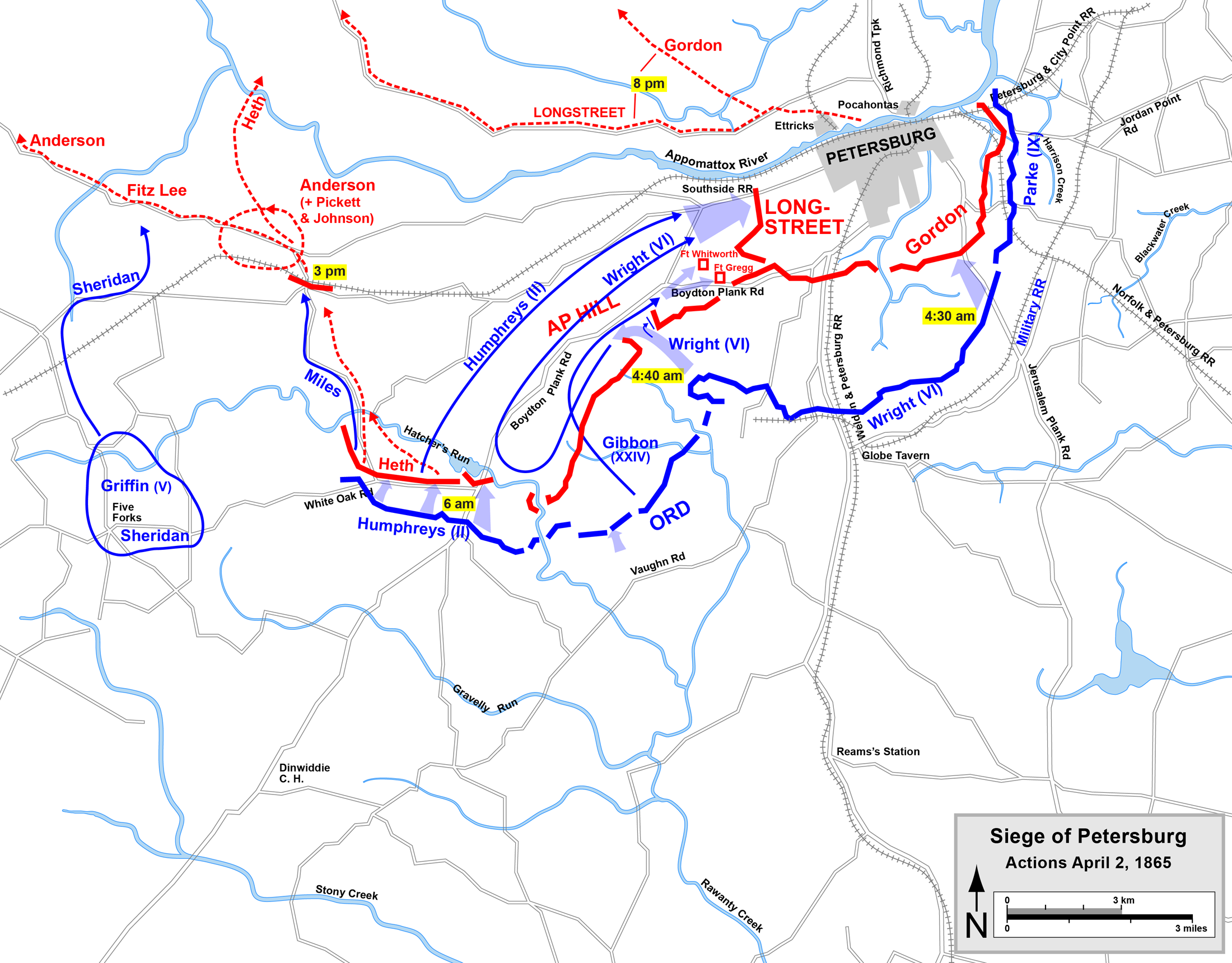
Grant's assault on the Petersburg line and the start of Lee's retreat

=== Artillery barrage ===
As ordered by General Grant, at 10:00 p.m., Union artillery opened fire with 150 guns on the Confederate lines opposite the Union Army's Petersburg lines until 2:00 a.m. (Note: Hess says the artillery barrage lasted until 1:00 a.m. Hess, 2009, p. 264. Trudeau says it lasted for five hours. Trudeau, 1994, p. 49.) The Confederates did not leave the lines that night and the Union assault began at about 4:30 a.m.

=== Plan of attack ===
Major Generals Andrew Humphreys with the II Corps, Horatio Wright with the VI Corps, John Parke with the IX Corps and Edward Ord, commander of the Army of the James, with Major General John Gibbon's XXIV Corps had been planning the attack scheduled for 4:00 a.m. on April 2, 1865 for three days. Grant directed them to carry the trenches and fortifications opposite their corps and move toward Petersburg. General Sheridan was instructed to start at dawn and move up the White Oak Road and all north of it to Petersburg as he had informed Grant that he would.

Opposite Ord and Wright were the Confederate brigades of Brigadier Generals Joseph R. Davis, under the command of Colonel Andrew M. Nelson, William McComb, James H. Lane and Edward L. Thomas of Major General Cadmus M. Wilcox's division of A.P. Hill's corps. Opposite Parke was Major General John B. Gordon's corps of about 7,600 men.

== Battle ==
=== Sixth Corps breakthrough at Boydton Plank Road Line ===
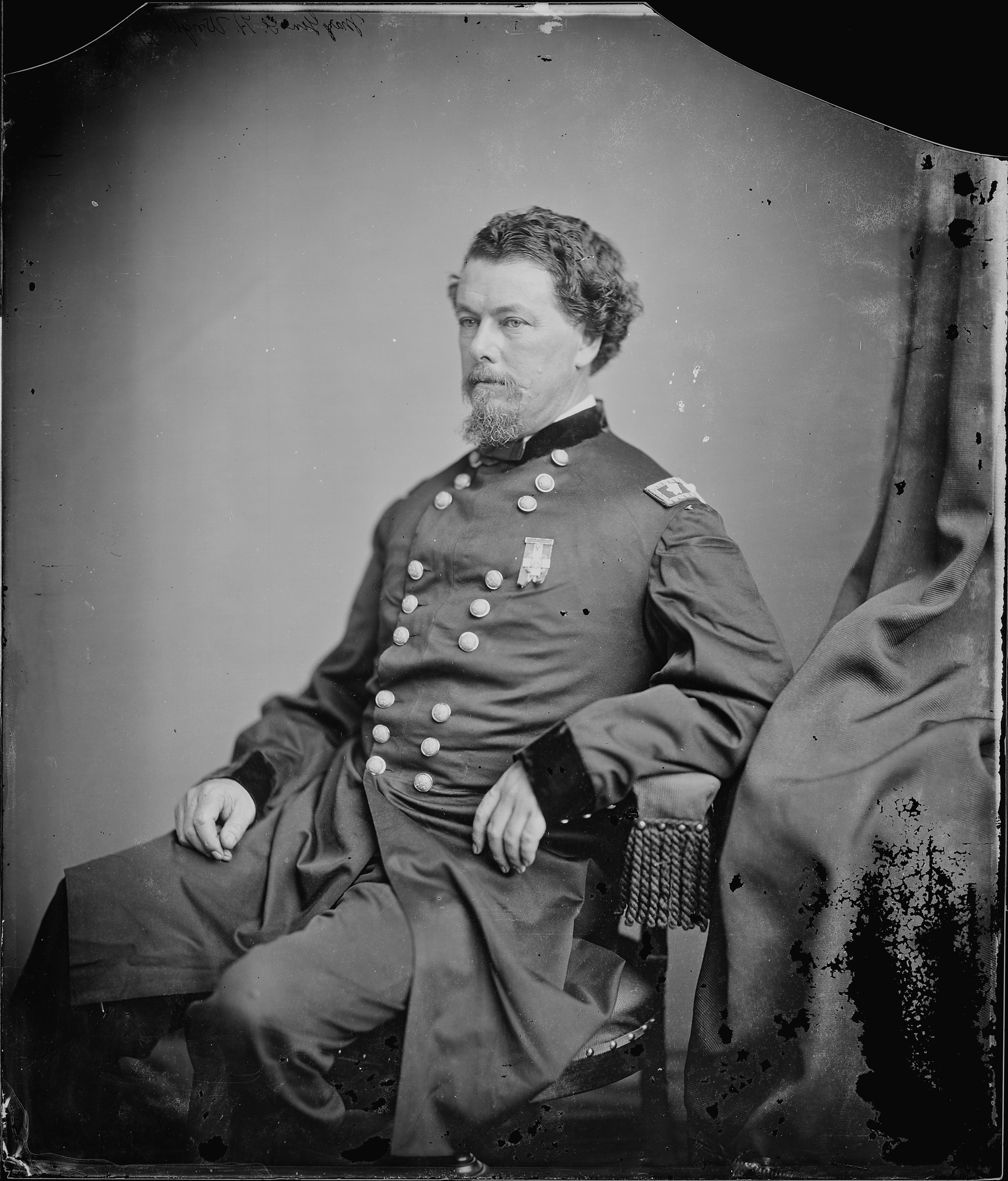
Major General Horatio G. Wright

After careful planning during the two preceding days, Wright had chosen to attack the Confederate line from the Jones house to the left end of his line opposite Union Forts Fisher and Welch. The land between the lines of the two armies was clear of trees and had few natural obstacles except for some marshes near the left end of Wright's line. To the right of the point of attack were inundated areas and strong defenses near the Lead Works. The Confederates had batteries sited every few hundred yards along their line. The capture of the Confederate picket line during the Battle of Jones's Farm on March 25, 1865 put the VI Corps close enough to the main Confederate line, with a covered approach to within 2,500 yards (2,300 m) of the defenses, for the attack to succeed.

After the Battle of Jones's Farm, from the advanced position of the Union line, Union Brigadier General (Brevet Major General) Lewis A. Grant of Getty's division saw a ravine which cut through the Confederate line. He also noticed an opening in the line and a plank road across the ditch for wagons as well as a few stakes missing in the obstacles for soldiers to pass through. When the day of the attack arrived, Grant's 1st Vermont Brigade would have its left on the ravine and other units would be guided by the position of that brigade.

During the attack, only small garrisons were left in the Union forts and trenches. Wright had about 14,000 troops to attack about 2,800 defenders over about 1 mile (1.6 km) of line. Forming for mass attack just behind the Union picket line, Wright's entire corps was placed in a wedge formation about 1 mile (1.6 km) wide. Brigadier General (Brevet Major General) George W. Getty's Second Division was in the middle front and in advance of the other two brigades for the assault while Brigadier General (Brevet Major General) Frank Wheaton's First Division was on the right rear and Brigadier General Truman Seymour's Third Division was on the left rear. Despite the close formation, brigades were to keep intervals between them and the lines in each brigade were to be kept at least 50 paces apart.

The VI Corps was in high spirits after the success of the Valley Campaigns under Maj. Gen. Philip Sheridan, but the enlisted men were nervous about this attack; not realizing just how thin the Confederate lines had become. They knew only that they were being asked to attack trench lines that they had always assumed to be impregnable. Believing that the assault would end in a disaster similar to Cold Harbor ten months earlier, many men wrote down their names and home addresses on pieces of paper and pinned them to their shirts so their bodies could be identified afterwards.

The Union attackers assembled in the dark only about 600 yards (550 m) from the Confederate picket line and 600 yards (550 m) from the Confederate main line. Although vision was poor in the dark night, some defenders were alerted by the activity and began to fire randomly into the Union assembly area. The Union force took some casualties, including Brigadier General Lewis Grant who suffered a severe head wound and had to relinquish command to Lieutenant Colonel Amasa S. Tracy. Two regimental commanders in Colonel Thomas W. Hyde's brigade were mortally wounded. Despite the Confederate shooting, the Union troops were not allowed to return fire in order not to give away the planned attack. Getty's men had to lie on their arms on the cold ground for nearly four hours before the attack. Seymour's division was hard hit by shooting from Confederate pickets who had been provoked by firing from nearby Union outposts.

==== Getty's attack ====
Because vision was limited at 4:00 a.m., the Union attack began at 4:40 a.m. with the firing of a signal gun from Fort Fisher. The 1st Vermont Brigade, with Colonel Amasa Tracy commanding in lieu of the wounded Lewis Grant, led the assault. Pioneers were in front to dismantle abatis and other obstructions. Artillerymen were also placed with the attackers to turn captured Confederate guns against them. An artillery battery of four guns was assigned to each division with two others in reserve while three others were left in the Union forts. Sharpshooters also were deployed with the attackers. The heavy bombardment already launched along the IX Corps' front masked the sound of the signal gun from Fort Fisher for some of the officers. A staff officer had to hail Colonel Tracy of the Vermont Brigade to begin the attack. The attack started in such dim light that the men still could not see much beyond the extent of their own company.

The Confederate line in front of the attackers was defended by Brigadier General James H. Lane's North Carolina brigade, with sharpshooters from Brigadier General Samuel McGowan's South Carolina brigade manning the picket line. On Lane's left was Brigadier General Edward L. Thomas's Georgia brigade and part of Brigadier General William MacRae's North Carolina brigade was on his right. Colonel Andrew M. Nelson's Mississippi brigade, Brigadier General Samuel McGowan's South Carolina brigade, Brigadier General William McComb's Maryland and Tennessee brigade and other regiments of MacRae's brigade held other segments of the 6 miles (9.7 km) of earthworks between Indian Town Creek and Burgess Mill.

The Confederate picket line was overwhelmed quickly by the Union attackers. Despite the heavy fire from the main Confederate defenses and batteries, much of the initial artillery fire from the defenders was too high to hit the Union men, but the Confederate gunners soon adjusted their range. The Vermont Brigade began to falter under the more well-directed musket and artillery fire. Although the account of a soldier from the 4th Vermont Infantry Regiment stated that as many as half broke for the rear and others stopped at the pickets' rifle pits, Captain Merritt Barber of the Vermont Brigade said most mustered their courage and plunged ahead. The Confederate main line was reached through openings cut away by the pioneers and existing openings left by Confederates to provide access to the front. Many Union soldiers reached the obstructions before the pioneers and tore them away with bare hands or found small openings to pass through. Most of the Union casualties were suffered while the soldiers crossed the ground between the pickets' rifle pits and the obstructions.

Despite being disorganized by the need to deal with the obstructions, the Vermonters rushed over the Confederate defenses, forcing many defenders, probably from the 18th North Carolina Infantry Regiment and the 37th North Carolina Infantry Regiment, to surrender.

The first Union soldier over the Confederate defenses was Captain Charles G. Gould of the 5th Vermont Infantry Regiment of the Vermont Brigade of Getty's division, who moved to the left of the main body through the ravine, down the Confederate picket path and over the plank bridge with three other men. (Note: Brigade commander Lieutenant Colonel J. Warren Keifer of Major General Truman Seymour's Division stated in a report six weeks after the breakthrough that Sergeant John E. Buffington of the 6th Maryland Infantry Regiment was the first man from the brigade over the works and Seymour claimed that Keifer's men were the first into the Confederate line, although he later said that Buffington was the first man over the works from his division, not the entire corps. Buffington was awarded the Medal of Honor in 1908. Greene, 2008, pp. 249–250.) He was soon followed by Lieutenant Robert Pratt and about 50 other men. Gould suffered three severe bayonet and sword wounds, including two to his head, but a rifle pointed at him point blank misfired. He survived his injuries after being helped back over the parapet by Corporal Henry H. Rector. (Note: Bearss identifies Gould's rescuer a sergeant.) Gould later received the Medal of Honor. Soon after Gould's rescue, Lieutenant Pratt of the 5th Vermont Infantry and several other men captured the battery. Color-Bearer Sergeant Jackson Sargent planted the state colors on the parapet followed by Corporal Nelson E. Carle with the national flag. The 3rd New York Independent Battery of Captain William A. Harn entered the captured works behind the infantry and put nearby Confederate artillery out of action within a few minutes. To the right of the ravine, the main attack of the Vermont Brigade soon expanded the breach in the Confederate works.

While the Vermont Brigade breached the Confederate line on the left flank of the Union attack, to their right Colonel Thomas W. Hyde's brigade became disorganized in the darkness. Ultimately the men who maintained the attack and reached the fortifications jumped over the works and broke the Confederate line. To the right of Hyde's brigade, Colonel (Brevet Brigadier General) James M. Warner's brigade's lead regiment, the 102nd Pennsylvania Infantry, became disoriented in the near darkness and over the swampy ground after taking the rifle pits. Just after Colonels Tracy's and Hyde's men had broken the Confederate line, the 139th Pennsylvania Infantry Regiment under Major James McGregor closed the gap with the 102nd Pennsylvania Infantry and moved forward with some of their men and the 93rd Pennsylvania Infantry. Major James A. Weston later wrote that his 33rd North Carolina Infantry Regiment amounted to a mere skirmish line and was overcome by sheer force of numbers, although McGregor wrote that the Confederates appeared glad to surrender when the Pennsylvanians reached their line. With this action, half of Lane's brigade had been overcome by Getty's division.

==== Wheaton's attack ====
Wheaton's division was led by the axmen and 75 skirmishers from the 37th Massachusetts Infantry Regiment armed with Spencer repeating rifles. Colonel (Brevet Brigadier General) Oliver Edwards's brigade was on the left, next to Warner's brigade. Thicker, more secure abatis and sharpened stakes slowed Wheaton's division's advance. The Massachusetts sharpshooters were able to suppress Confederate fire to allow the pioneers to open gaps in the obstructions. Edwards's men found that a moat guarded a three-gun battery past the abatis, but soldiers from the 5th Wisconsin Infantry Regiment and 37th Massachusetts Infantry Regiment scaled the earthworks.

In Edward's second line of battle, Lieutenant Colonel Elisha Hunt Rhodes led his 2nd Rhode Island Volunteer Infantry Regiment on a flanking maneuver down a wagon path where he could reform a battle line and cross the main Confederate line. The pickets in the rifle pits quickly surrendered. Rhodes spotted four cannons on the left and two more on the right. Rhodes and several men ran forward and jumped into the ditch in front of the line just as Lane's and Thomas's troops opened fire. The Union soldiers then quickly climbed up the exterior slope to the top of the earthworks before the Confederates could reload and fire, causing the Confederates to retreat from the onrushing Rhode Islanders. Lieutenant Frank S. Halliday and Corporal William Railton stopped a Confederate counterattack with a blast from one of two captured cannons.

Rhodes re-formed his regiment and waited for further orders after crossing the Boydton Plank Road. He turned toward the earthworks, along with the 82nd Pennsylvania Infantry Regiment, to support the advance of other brigades. His flanking maneuver contributed to the capture of the sector of line that was attacked by Wheaton's other brigades. Nonetheless, Colonel William Penrose's New Jersey brigade was held back by more determined Confederate pickets, causing all four regiments to become mixed. After enough of Penrose's men to carry an assault gathered in the moat in front of the Confederate earthworks, they stormed over the barrier and subdued the stubborn North Carolina defenders.

To the right of Penrose's brigade, Colonel (Brevet Brigadier General) Joseph Hamblin's brigade had the longest distance to cross before reaching the Confederate line, which was held at that point by Brigadier General Edward L. Thomas's Georgia brigade. The attack was covered by sharpshooters led by Captain James T. Stuart from the 49th Pennsylvania Infantry Regiment, who were armed with Spencer repeating rifles. The brigade had to overcome a line of chevaux-de-frise followed by a line of abatis. Unlike the other brigades of Wheaton's division, Hamblin's brigade did not need to engage in hand-to-hand combat to overcome the defenders, many of whom were retreating from flank fire from Union soldiers in adjacent Confederate trenches that already had been occupied. Some of Hamblin's men headed for the South Side Railroad to the north but most turned right and advanced toward Petersburg. Wheaton's advance had been supported by important counter-battery work by a section of Battery H, 1st Rhode Island Light Artillery.

==== Seymour's attack ====
On the left of the Sixth Corps' formation, Truman Seymour's division, led by Colonel J. Warren Keifer's brigade, dispersed MacRae's North Carolina brigade. Keifer directed his leading regiment to pass through an opening in the obstructions which Union soldiers had spotted earlier. Keifer's front ranks drove through the Confederate pickets with unloaded rifles and moved toward the abatis in front of the main line. After breaking the abatis, pieces of which Keifer's men used to bridge the moat in front of the works, Keifer's regiments quickly drove off the 28th North Carolina Infantry Regiment, captured 10 pieces of artillery, a large number of prisoners, three battle flags and Major General Henry Heth's headquarters flag.

Colonel William S. Truex led the rest of Seymour's division against the 11th North Carolina Infantry Regiment, the 52nd North Carolina Infantry Regiment and a six-gun artillery battery on the far left of the VI Corps assault. The Union men came under heavy fire as they moved forward and all five regiments became mixed as they advanced in the near darkness, but the Confederates held their fire when their own pickets began to flee toward the main line. The outnumbered North Carolina soldiers were overwhelmed by the Union force, led by the 10th Vermont Infantry Regiment. Seymour's attack had been greatly assisted by a section of Battery G, 1st Rhode Island Light Artillery and the Third New York Independent Battery.

After about 30 minutes of heavy fighting, the Confederate lines were broken and Wright's VI Corps had made a decisive breakthrough. As the VI Corps surged forward, some soldiers ultimately crossed the Boydton Plank Road and reached the South Side Railroad about 1 mile (1.6 km) away.

=== A.P. Hill killed ===
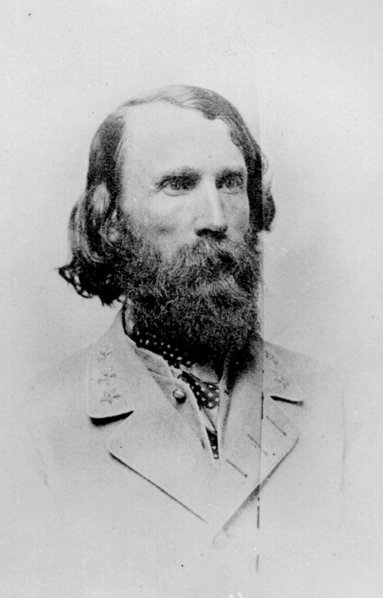
Lieutenant General A. P. Hill

After the initial breakthrough, stragglers from Wright's corps continued heading straight forward toward the South Side Railroad while most of the VI Corps troops turned to the left. A.P. Hill and Robert E. Lee both learned of the breakthrough soon after it occurred. At about 5:30 a.m. Hill rode to meet with Lee accompanied by two orderlies and an aide, Sergeant George W. Tucker. After meeting with Lee, Hill immediately mounted his horse and rode off with Colonel Charles S. Venable of Lee's staff, who was sent to find out the situation at the front, Tucker and Private William H. Jenkins. Hill intended to ride to the Boydton Line to organize its defense.

As the party rode along, another courier, Percy G. Hawes, joined the party, but Jenkins was sent back to Lee's headquarters with two Union prisoners. Hill's party all began to warn Hill about continuing as the situation appeared to be increasingly dangerous. Hill said the woods would screen them until they reached Henry Heth's headquarters. When they came into contact with the Confederate artillery of Lieutenant Colonel William T. Poague arriving from the Richmond lines, Hill ordered Venable to take Poague to protect Lee's headquarters at Edge Hill. At Venable's request, Hawes joined him, leaving only Tucker with Hill.

West of the Boydton Plank Road, two stragglers from the 138th Pennsylvania Infantry Regiment, Corporal John W. Mauk and Private Daniel Wolford, stumbled upon Hill and Tucker as they rode through woods parallel to the Boydton Plank Road. Hill demanded their surrender, but the Union soldiers took aim, fired and killed him. (Note: Keifer, 1900, p. 195 states that "Mouk" fired the fatal shot. Greene, 2008, p. 61 states that Wolford's shot missed. He estimated that Hill's death occurred at about 6:30 a.m.) Tucker escaped and rode back to Lee to report Hill's death.

=== VI Corps disperses Heth's division; XXIV Corps supports ===
Major General John Gibbon's XXIV Corps of the Army of the James was unable to extend the breakthrough by assaulting the main Confederate line southeast across the Boydton Plank Road, to the left of the VI Corps, because the ground was too broken and marshy to cross. Grant ordered Major General Ord to have this corps follow the VI Corps to exploit the breakthrough instead. Ord sent all of Brigadier General Robert S. Foster's division and most of two brigades from Brigadier General John W. Turner's division of the XXIV Corps to follow Wright's corps, keeping Brigadier General William Birney's division of the XXV Corps in reserve. Brigadier General Thomas M. Harris's brigade of Turner's division captured a section of the Confederate line southwest of Wright's breakthrough after the defenders had evacuated.

Screened by men of the 49th Pennsylvania Infantry Regiment armed with Spencer repeating rifles, several regiments of Colonel (Brevet Brigadier General) Joseph Hamblin's brigade, including the 119th Pennsylvania Infantry Regiment and the 65th New York Infantry, advanced to the right (north). These regiments drove Brigadier General Edward L. Thomas's Georgia brigade back toward the inner defenses of Petersburg. Wright left Hamblin's brigade to guard the captured line as he reorganized most of the remaining men of the corps to move south.

Army of the Potomac commander Major General George Meade had not given Major General Wright specific orders to govern his actions after a breakthrough, telling him only to be guided by the situation developed by the operations of other divisions. After the breakthrough, Wright had to reorganize his corps which was scattered during the breakthrough in order to proceed. Some men had advanced past the Boydton Plank Road to the South Side Railroad where they found and burned a small wagon train, cut telegraph lines and even dislodged a few rails. While some regiments stopped along the Confederate works to collect prisoners, and many stragglers continued forward, many VI Corps men congregated at or near the Boydton Plank Road.

Wright and his officers brought some order to seven brigades and turned this large part of his corps to the left to deal with the troops of Major General Henry Heth's division still holding the Confederate line to the southwest with about 1,600 men. From their position on the Confederate flank and in their rear, Wright's seven brigades formed into a battle line as far as the Boydton Plank Road to move against Heth's men.

Confederate Brigadier General William McComb's brigade faced northwest with its right on the Boydton Plank Road Line to meet the threat from Wright's brigades. The VI Corps attackers rolled past them and captured Confederate Fort Davis but lost it back to McComb's counterattack about 20 minutes later. Wright's men attacked again at 7:00 a.m., swept Heth's men from their defenses, and then moved forward toward Hatcher's Run. By 7:45 a.m., Heth and the remaining men of his division, with only Cooke's brigade mostly intact, were withdrawing toward Sutherland's Station. Most of Cooke's brigade had withdrawn when Division commander Brigadier General John W. Turner's Third Brigade under Brigadier General Thomas M. Harris charged a section of Cooke's line northeast of Hatcher's Run, capturing two guns, three battle flags and 30 officers and men.

By 9:00 a.m., Wright realized that there was little more his corps could do at the Hatcher's Run end of the line and that Humphrey's II Corps was moving against this sector of the Confederate line in any event. At about the same time, Thomas Harris's brigade learned of Wright's general advance. When the XXIV Corps followed the VI Corps' advance, Major General Ord sent an engineer, Lieutenant Colonel Peter S. Michie, to find a location for a defensive line in the event the Confederates counterattacked. Instead, Michie ordered Ord's troops forward when he saw the VI Corps' accomplishment, leading to the meeting of Ord and Gibbon with Wright. When Wright met Ord and Gibbon in the Confederate works, they decided that since the Confederate defense had collapsed, they would turn their combined force toward the city. By about 10:00 a.m., Ord and Wright were moving 15,000 men in a line facing northeast, with Ord on the right and Wright on the left as they advanced toward the city with the idea of attempting to break the western defenses of Petersburg. As the VI Corps approached the Whitworth house near the Appomattox River, Major General Gibbon's XXIV Corps was allowed to pass them and lead the move toward the city. The VI Corps deployed in support of the XXIV Corps but instead of being able to rest, the troops on the north end of the line would have to deal with Confederate artillery fire protecting Lee's headquarters at the Turnbull House on Edge Hill.

==== Counterattack, withdrawal ====
Confederates from Brigadier General William R. Cox's Brigade of Major General Bryan Grimes's Division of the Second Corps held the Confederate line to the east of the broken Confederate main line. Except for Colonel Joseph Hamblin's brigade holding the captured sector of the line, the VI Corps had turned to the southwest so Cox's brigade was not immediately attacked nor did Cox counterattack Hamblin.

When Brigadier General Lane withdrew from his position, he met Major General Cadmus Wilcox near Fort Gregg. Wilcox insisted on attempting to reclaim the Confederate lines or at least to block a further breakthrough. Near Fort Gregg, Wilcox and Lane assembled about 600 fugitives of Lane's and Thomas's brigades from the VI Corps breakthrough. From this position north of the main line, the Confederates attacked about 80 men of Hamblin's brigade under the command of Lieutenant Colonels Henry C. Fisk and John Harper who were holding the end of the captured line. The Union soldiers withdrew in the face of this large force, leaving two captured guns behind. Lane's men then formed a line facing west along Church Road perpendicular to the old line. This minor advance, which lasted less than an hour, still left over 4 miles (6.4 km) of the Confederate line in the Union Army's possession.

About 15 minutes thereafter, Gibbon's XXIV Corps advanced toward the Church Road line and Forts Gregg and Whitworth. An immediate attack by the lead brigade from Brigadier General Robert S. Foster's division under the command of Colonel (Brevet Brigadier General) Thomas O. Osborn recaptured the line and two cannons. The defenders from Lane's and Thomas's brigades in the newly formed line and the Mississippi brigade of Brigadier General Nathaniel H. Harris, who had moved in front of the forts, retreated toward Forts Gregg and Whitworth. Osborn's brigade had reversed the minor setback in the Union advance without loss of life. Gibbon continued to advance the XXIV Corps toward the Appomattox River near the Whitworth house.

=== Forts Gregg and Whitworth ===
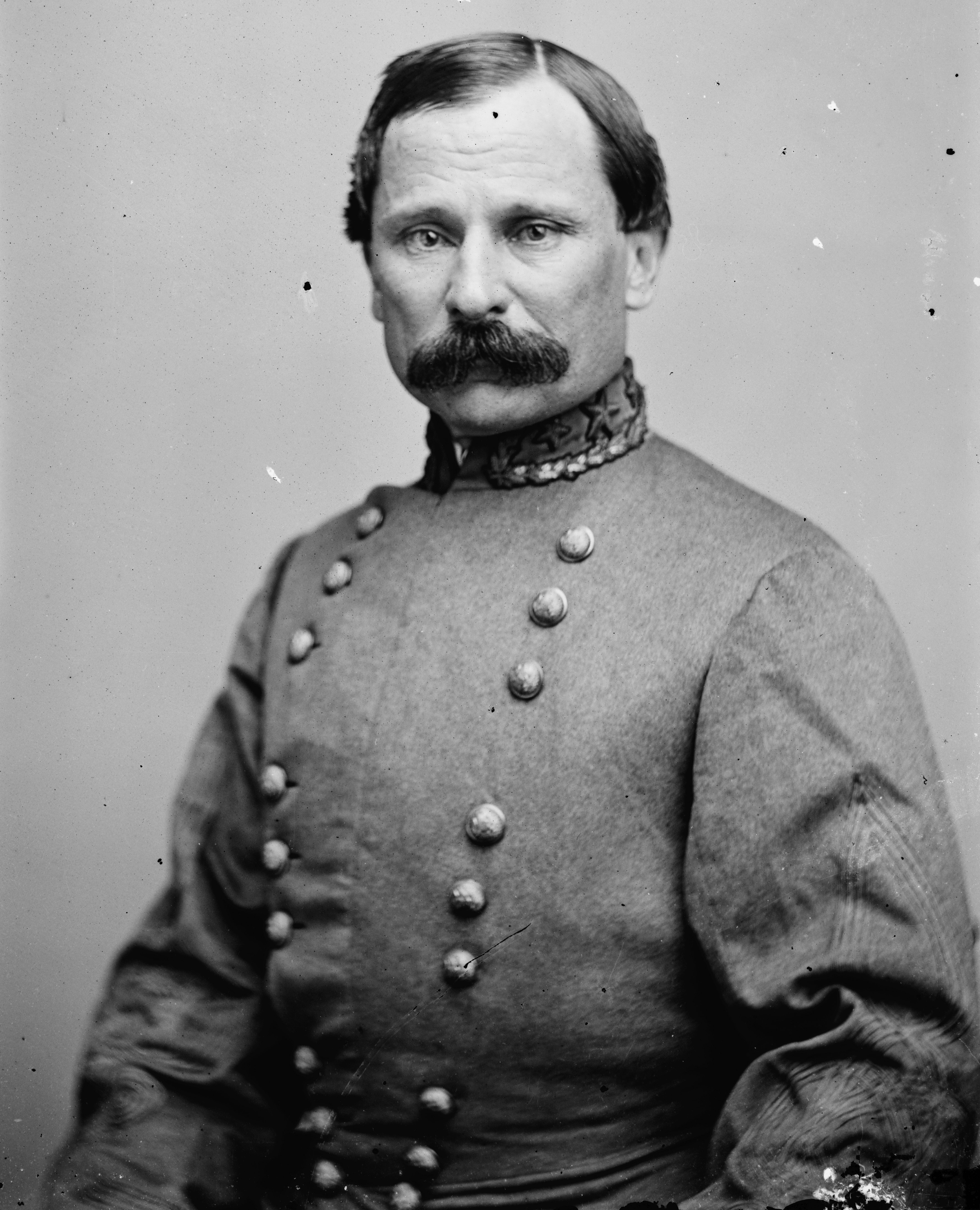
Major General Cadmus Wilcox

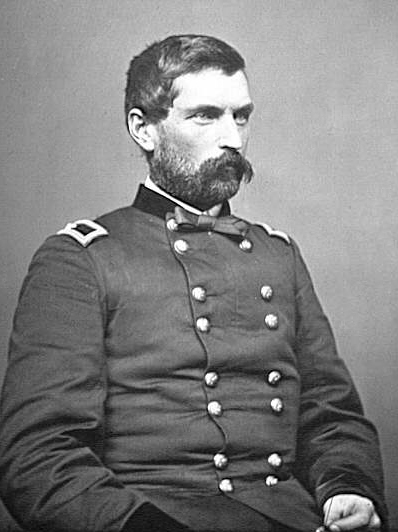
Major General John Gibbon

The survivors of Brigadier Generals James H. Lane's and Edward L. Thomas's brigades withdrew northeast to the old Dimmock Line defenses between the VI Corps breakthrough and Petersburg. Brigadier General Lane and Major General Wilcox stationed the men in Fort Gregg and Fort Whitworth, which were built along with the Boydton Plank Road Line in Fall 1864. The forts were northwest of the Boydton Plank Road, about 1,000 yards (910 m) in front of the Dimmock Line. (Note: Greene, 2008, p. 285 locates the forts about 1 mile (1.6 km) west of the Dimmock Line on the north side of the Boydton Plank Road.) Fort Whitworth (also known at various times as Fort Baldwin, Fort Anderson, and Fort Alexander) was 600 yards (550 m) to the north of Fort Gregg. Although Fort Whitworth was larger, it was deteriorated in part due to the removal of wood for firewood by some of the same Confederate troops now sent to defend it who were camped nearby during the winter. The two forts were connected only by an uncompleted trench at the rear.

After Wilcox had directed the short-lived reoccupation of a small sector of Confederate line near Fort Gregg, four regiments of 400 veterans of Brigadier General Nathaniel Harris's Mississippi Brigade arrived and advanced 400 yards (370 m) beyond the two forts to meet the approaching XXIV Corps. Harris's brigade, with some of Longstreet's troops from the Richmond defenses following closely behind, was sent to reinforce Lane's and Thomas's remaining troops in an effort by the Confederates to hold the Dimmock Line from the Appomattox River to Battery No. 45.

Upon arriving near the forts at the same time as Nathaniel Harris's brigade arrived, XXIV Corps commander John Gibbon deployed Brigadier General Robert S. Foster's division on the right and units of Brigadier General John W. Turner's division behind on a small ridge 800 yards (730 m) from the forts. Thomas T. Harris's brigade of Turner's division deployed on the left to confront Fort Whitworth.

Nathaniel Harris later commented that his disposition of men on the undulating ground must have misled the Union commanders about the size of his force because they slowly and carefully formed two lines of battle before advancing. Nonetheless, the lead brigade of Brigadier General Robert S. Foster's division under Colonel (Brevet Brigadier General) Thomas O. Osborn immediately charged when they formed on the scene, causing Nathaniel Harris's and the North Carolina troops in the reoccupied area along Church Road to pull back toward the forts without offering any serious opposition.

To buy time for reinforcements from Major General Charles W. Field's division of Longstreet's corps to arrive and take positions on the Dimmock Line, Nathaniel Harris's brigade along with detachments from Thomas's and Lane's brigades made a stand at Forts Gregg and Whitworth while other Confederate units pulled back to or arrived at the main works. Two hundred men of the 12th Mississippi Infantry Regiment and 16th Mississippi Infantry Regiment under Lieutenant Colonel James H. Duncan of the 19th Mississippi Infantry Regiment along with artillerymen and a few troops from Lane's brigade, for a total of about 350 men, held Fort Gregg. Nathaniel Harris personally commanded the 19th Mississippi Infantry Regiment and the 48th Mississippi Infantry Regiment and a few artillerymen, totaling about 200 men, in Fort Whitworth. There were two three-inch rifled guns in Fort Gregg. Brigadier General Reuben Lindsay Walker, artillery chief of the Third Corps, removed the four rifled guns from Fort Whitworth before the Union attack because he was convinced that they would be captured by the attackers if he did not. The defenders of the forts collected and loaded extra rifles and positioned extra ammunition along the walls in preparation for the attack.

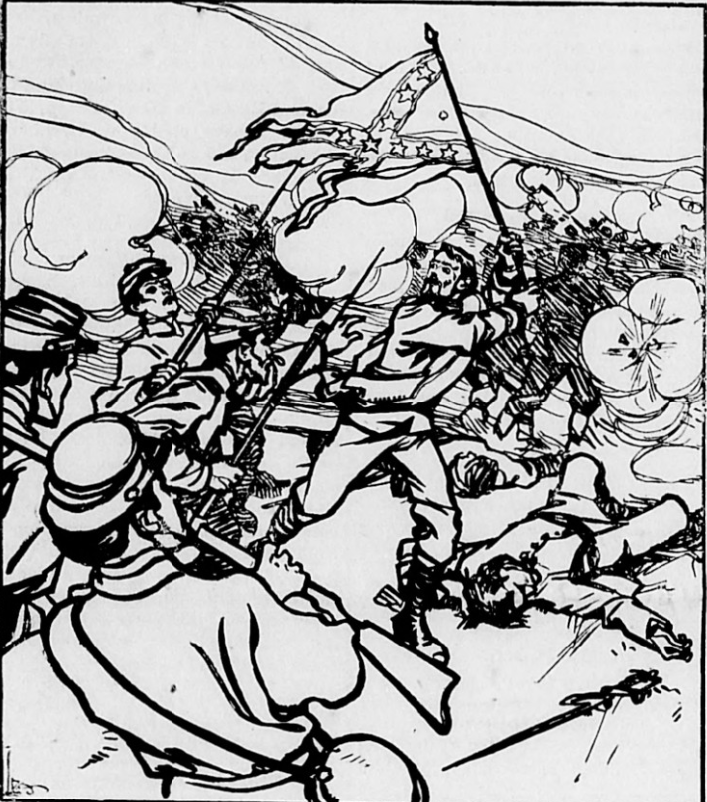
1906 illustration of the fighting at Fort Gregg

Led by the brigade of Colonel (Brevet Brigadier General) Thomas O. Osborn and two regiments of the brigade of Colonel George B. Dandy of Brigadier General Robert S. Foster's division, the Union force formed on a low ridge 800 yards (730 m) south of the fort as soon as they arrived and then promptly proceeded with the assault. Colonel Harrison S. Fairchild's brigade formed as a reserve behind Osborn and Dandy's brigades. Gibbon's artillery, the Third Vermont Battery of Captain Romeo H. Start and a section of the First New York Independent Battery under Lieutenant William Sears, who were borrowed from Fort Fisher by Lieutenant Colonel Peter S. Michie because the XXIV Corps artillery had not come up yet from Hatcher's Run, silenced Fort Gregg's guns.

A ditch partially filled with water surrounded Fort Gregg. After crossing a field of deadly fire to reach the fort, many of the attackers ran into the ditch only to be mired in water and mud. Wounded men risked drowning unless helped out of the water. Soldiers of the 67th Ohio Infantry Regiment reached the ditch first but could not work their way around to the rear entrance due to the water in the ditch. The 62nd Ohio Infantry Regiment lost many men in their advance and struggled to gain footholds in the muddy ditch to climb the parapet. Colonel Dandy's brother, Major James H. Dandy, commanding the 100th New York Infantry Regiment, was killed trying to reach the rear of the fort. Corporal and Color-Bearer John Kane of the 100th New York Infantry was awarded the Medal of Honor for his gallantry in the attack by posting the national flag on the wall of Fort Gregg.

As Osborn's and Dandy's men were stymied in front of Fort Gregg, Brigadier General Foster sent two of Colonel Fairchild's regiments forward, merely for them also to get stuck in the muddy ditch. With Foster's brigades unable to take the fort, Brigadier General John W. Turner's Independent Division's (Second Division's) First Brigade under Lieutenant Colonel Andrew Potter and Second Brigade under Colonel William B. Curtis pushed up. They attacked the forts simultaneously and many of the men also ended up stuck in the ditch. The great majority of soldiers of 14 regiments reached the ditch in front of the fort where the attack stalled.

A total force of 4,000 men had attacked Fort Gregg, struggling for up to a half-hour to gain entry as the defenders threw "dirt, stones and various kinds of missiles," including rolled artillery shells, across the parapet onto their heads. (Note: Calkins, 2002, p. 50 states that the Union force was nearly 5,000 men.) Nathaniel Harris and other Confederate veterans later said that the defenders beat off three or four attacks before the attackers reached the ditch while Union accounts have the attackers reaching the ditch on the first assault, though with significant losses. (Note: Greene, 2008, p. 298 suggests that the slightly staggered assault by the Union regiments may have appeared to the Confederates to be separate attacks by the Union force.)

The defenders were ready for the Union men to scale the walls and killed or wounded many of the first attackers as they came to the top of the parapet. Eventually, Union soldiers found the uncompleted short trench in back of the fort which allowed them an easier opportunity to climb onto the fort's parapet. The mass of men in the ditch had to move or be killed so they started to scale the walls and rushed around the moat to find the unfinished trench or sally port in the rear. Soon the flags of the 12th West Virginia Infantry Regiment and 39th Illinois Infantry Regiment reached the top of the walls, inspiring more men to follow.

The 25 Mississippians who were detailed to defend Fort Gregg's palisaded gate in the rear were outnumbered by the Union soldiers who were able to get to the back of the fort and they became worn down by casualties. Attackers were able to gain entry to the fort from the rear at the same time that a large number of Union soldiers finally managed to gain the top of the parapet. Soldiers of the 12th West Virginia Infantry Regiment were the first to cross into the fort after their flag had been planted at the top of the wall. After several bayonet charges, the Union attackers finally carried the works by sheer force of numbers and, after desperate hand-to-hand combat, forced the surviving defenders to surrender. Union veterans reported that the interior of the fort was a pool of blood with dead and dying men strewn about in its small area by the time the surviving Confederates finally surrendered.

As the assault on Fort Gregg concluded, Turner's Third Brigade under Brigadier General Thomas M. Harris attacked Fort Whitworth, where Confederate Brigadier General Nathaniel Harris was in command. The defenders of Fort Whitworth had been shooting at the left and rear of the Union force gathered at the western fringes of Fort Gregg while the battle for that fort continued. Thomas Harris's troops fired into Fort Whitworth but did not try to storm it during the battle for Fort Gregg. Fort Whitworth fell soon after Fort Gregg was taken. As the battle for Fort Gregg was ending, Wilcox had ordered the defenders to retreat from Fort Whitworth. Only 69 or 70 Confederates were left to surrender by the time Brigadier General Thomas Harris's men finally charged Fort Whitworth and easily entered it, finding only two dead and two wounded Confederate soldiers with those who were left to surrender. About 15 other Confederate prisoners were taken outside the fort.

Gibbon reported that 55 Confederates were killed at Fort Gregg and about 300 captured, many of them wounded, along with two guns and several flags. (Note: Hess, 2009, p. 276 puts the Confederate casualties at 56 dead and 250 taken prisoner at Fort Gregg with 70 more taken prisoner at Fort Whitworth. Calkins, 2002, p. 50 gives the number of killed as 57, with 129 wounded and 30 taken prisoner.) Gibbon's loss for the day, mostly at the two forts, was 122 killed, 592 wounded, for a total of 714.

The entire attack on Fort Gregg took about two hours. (Note: Hess, 2009, p. 276 says the attackers required no more than an hour to subdue the fort but this is not in line with other accounts or estimates of two hours.) Yet, the defenders of Forts Gregg and Whitworth bought some valuable time which allowed Field's division and a few other defenders to occupy the Dimmock Line defenses. As Confederate reinforcements arrived, Field's division of Longstreet's corps, two brigades from Gordon's corps and some of General Wilcox's men occupied the main Confederate works on the Dimmock Line.

When the VI Corps advanced to Gibbon's left at the start of the attack on Fort Gregg, only Confederate artillery fire from Lieutenant Colonel William T. Poague's Battery, directed by Confederate staff officer Giles Buckner Cooke opposed them. The battery was operating from a position next to Lee's command post at the Turnbull House, also known as Edge Hill, located west of Rohoic Creek in front of the Dimmock Line. Getty's division had moved near the Turnbull House with limited protection from Poague's artillery. Getty determined to attack the 13 guns that were turned against his division from that location. Getty's first attack was turned back by heavy canister fire from the 13 guns. Getty then directed Colonel Edwards brigade to attack the artillery with an assault on its right flank while Colonel Hyde's brigade would attack on the left and front. Hyde's men successfully outflanked the batteries, leading to the withdrawal of the gunners and the 9 guns that had not been immobilized. Field's division occupied the Dimmock Line as the Confederate artillerists fled the Turnbull House, while General Lee also rode from the Turnbull House to the protection of the Dimmock Line as VI Corps infantrymen approached close enough to see him leave. After the Confederates evacuated Edge Hill, it was occupied by five VI Corps brigades that evening. The VI Corps and XXIV Corps then formed a continuous line opposite the Dimmock works. Mott's division from the II Corps filled in on the Whitworth farm after Seymour's division was sent that evening to reinforce Parke's IX Corps.

At the urging of Getty's staff officer, Lieutenant Colonel Hazard Stevens, Colonel Hyde and Colonel Penrose of the New Jersey Brigade led their men toward the newly arrived Confederates with the intention of attacking them. The Union commanders reconsidered after Penrose was knocked from his horse when a bullet struck his belt buckle. After dealing with more artillery fire from across the Appomattox River, General Grant ordered the exhausted VI Corps troops to halt and rest, which they did after completing some fortifications near the Turnbull House.

=== Lee advises of withdrawal ===
When General Robert E. Lee learned of the VI Corps breakthrough, he notified Confederate President Jefferson Davis that he would be forced to abandon Richmond and Petersburg and head toward Danville that night. Initially, Lee sent a telegram to Confederate Secretary of War John C. Breckinridge which stated:

I see no prospect of doing more than holding our position here until night. I am not certain I can do that. If I can I shall withdraw to-night north of the Appomattox, and, if possible, it will be better to withdraw the whole line to-night from James River. I advise that all preparations be made for leaving Richmond tonight. I will advise you later according to circumstances.

Breckinridge received the telegram at 10:40 a.m. and forwarded it to Davis, who received it while on the way to a worship service at St. Paul's Episcopal Church in Richmond. (Note: Trudeau, 1994, p. 57 says the notation in the diary of Bureau of War head Robert Garlick Hill Kean shows the telegram as received at 9:30 a.m.) The later telegram was received by Davis while at the worship service. It read:

I think it is absolutely necessary that we should abandon our position tonight. I have given all the necessary orders on the subject to the troops; and the operation, though difficult, I hope will be performed successfully. I have directed General Stevens to send an officer to your Excellency to explain the routes to you by which the troops will be moved to Amelia Court-House, and furnish you with a guide and any assistance that you may require for yourself.

Davis immediately began preparations for the Confederate government and such archives as could be transported to leave Richmond for Danville that night via the Richmond and Danville Railroad.

=== Parke attacks southeast of Petersburg ===
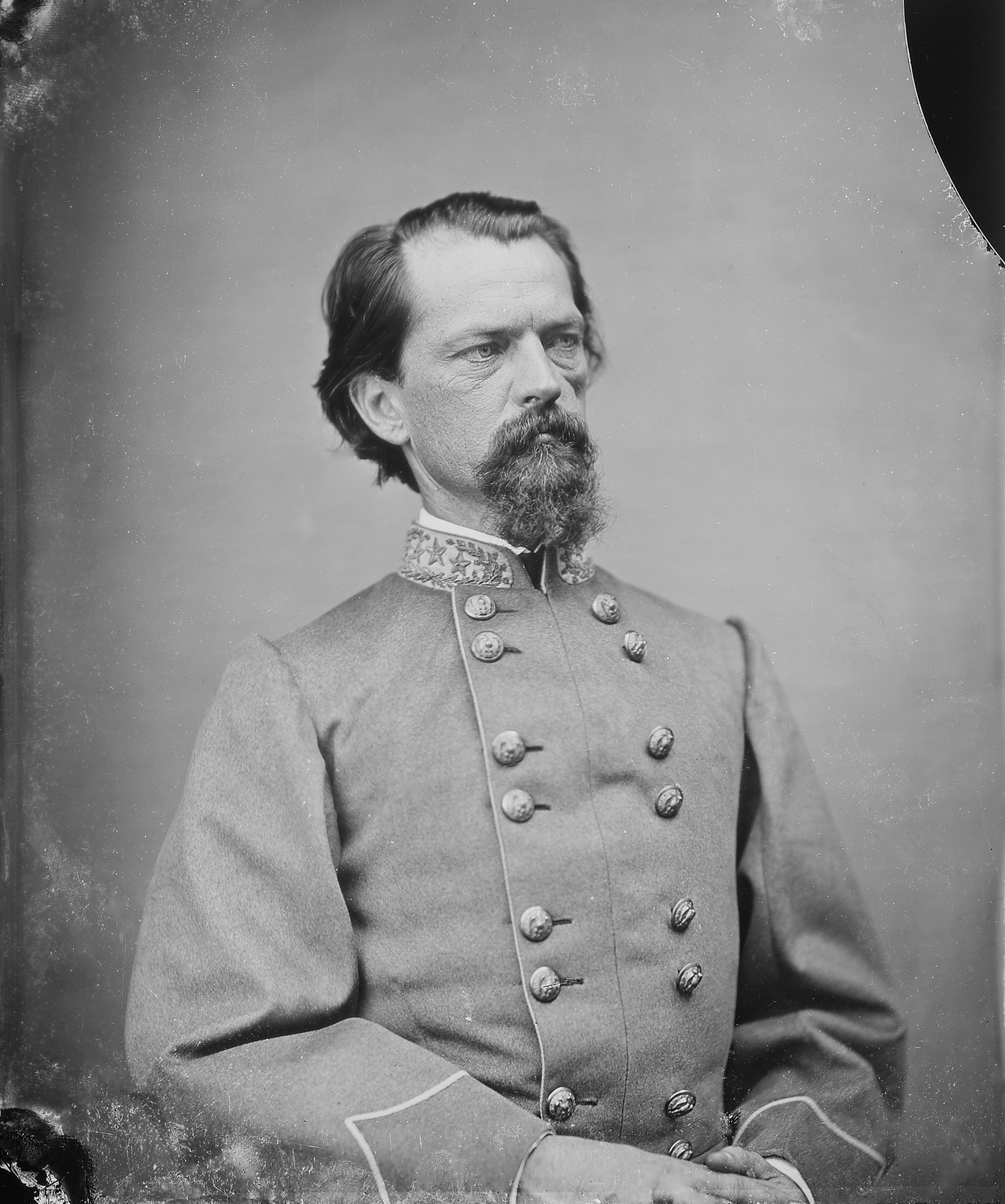
Major General John B. Gordon

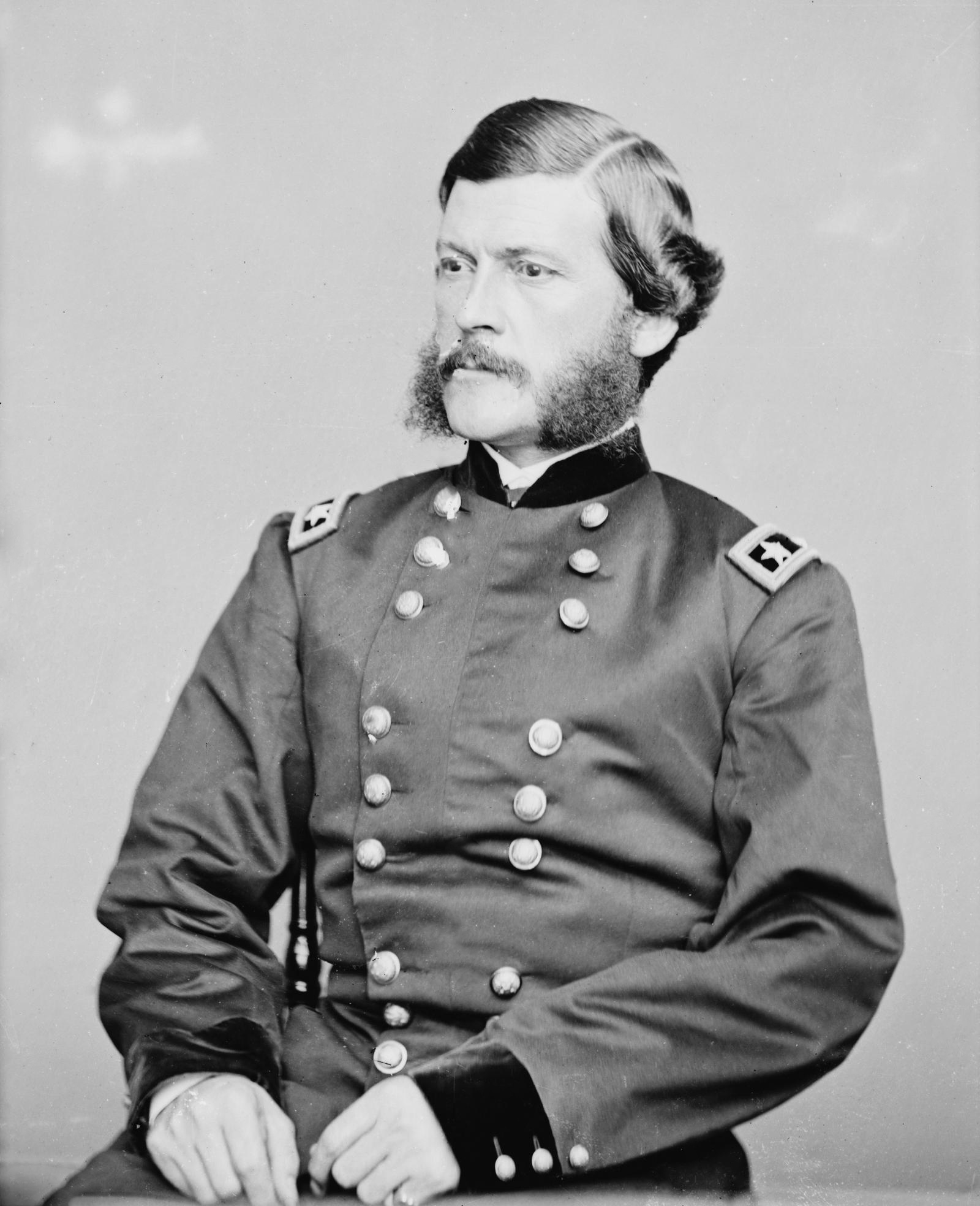
Major General John G. Parke

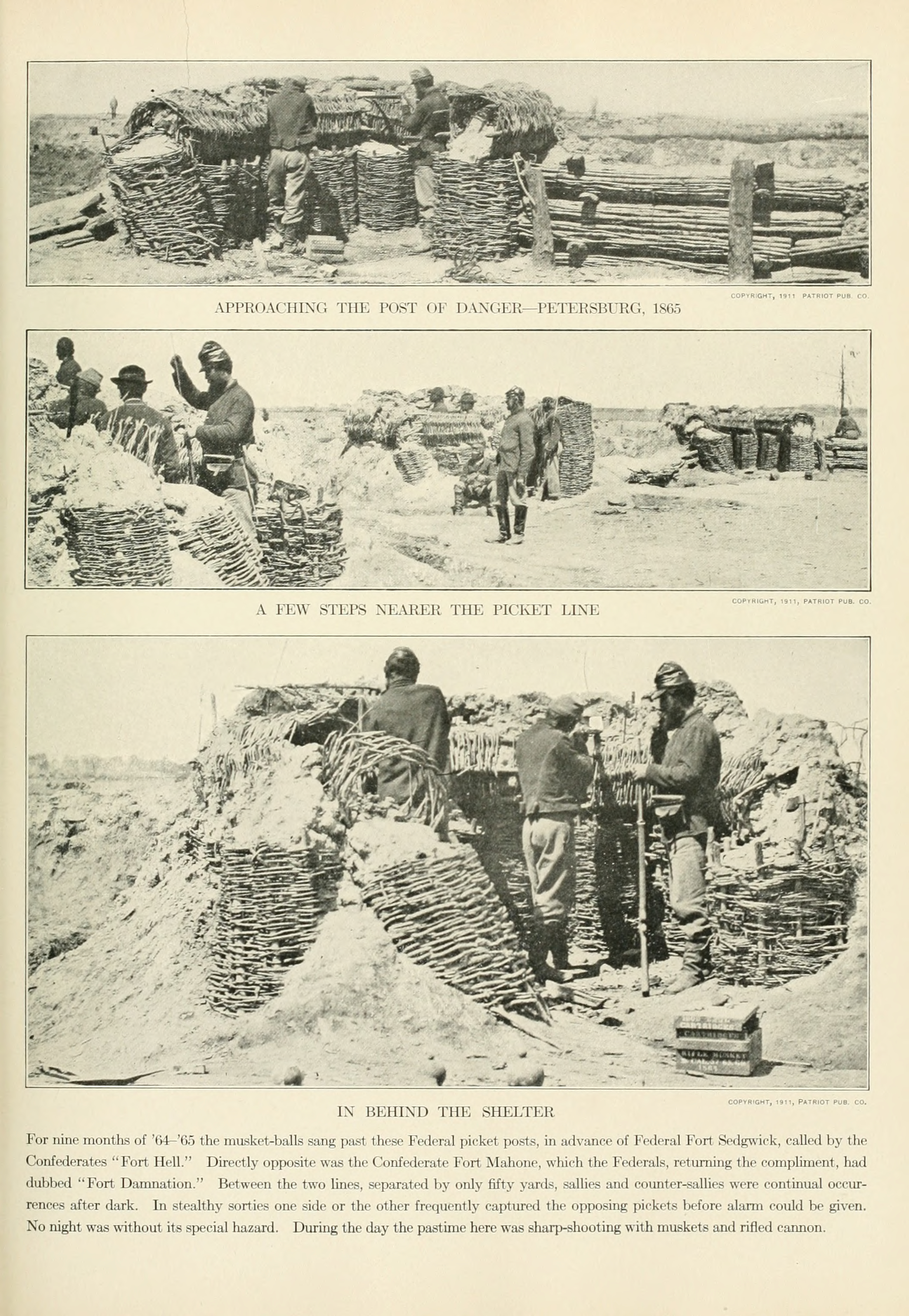
Picket Post in front of Union Fort Sedgwick

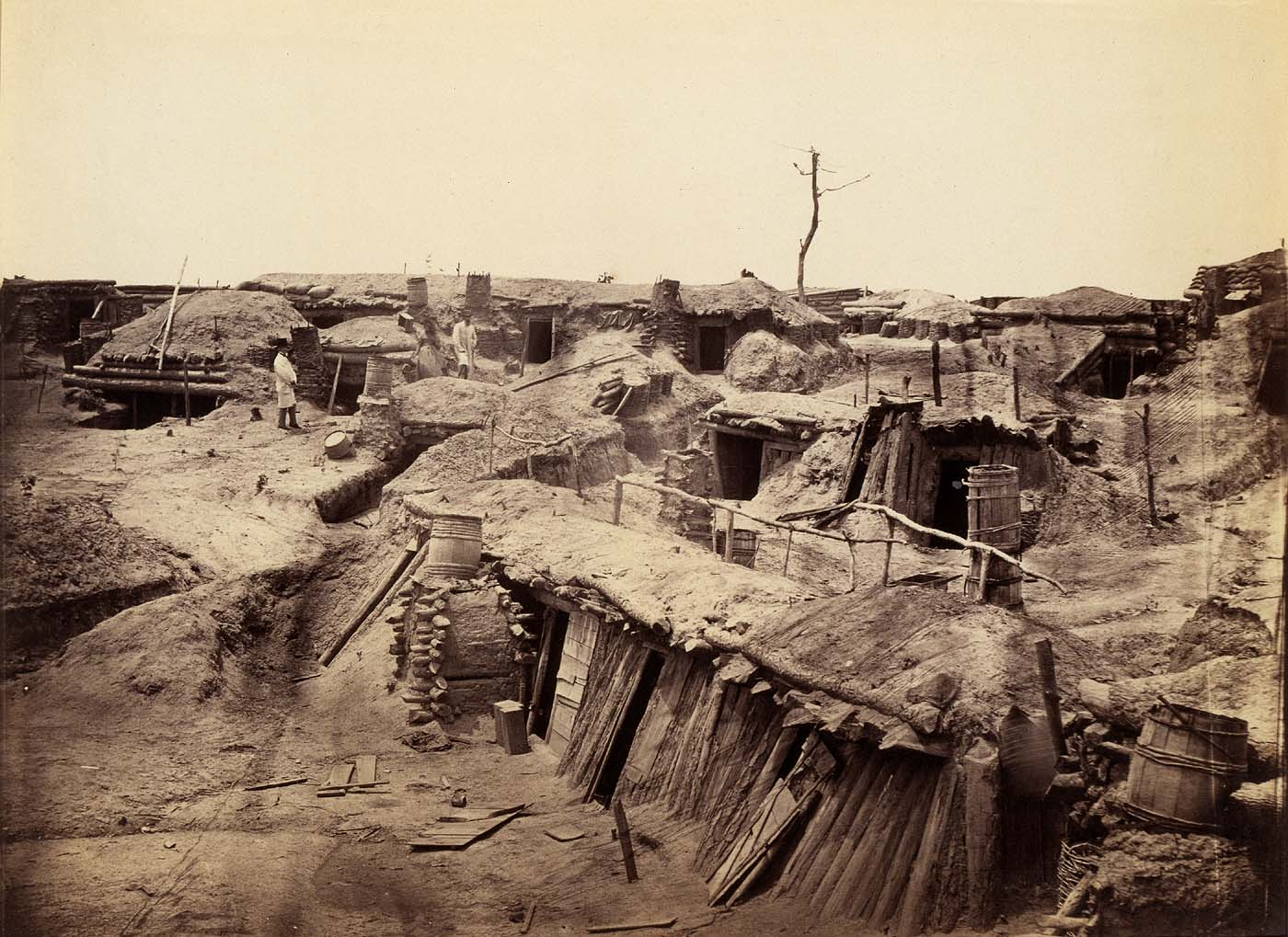
Quarters of Men in Union Fort Sedgwick, Known as "Fort Hell"

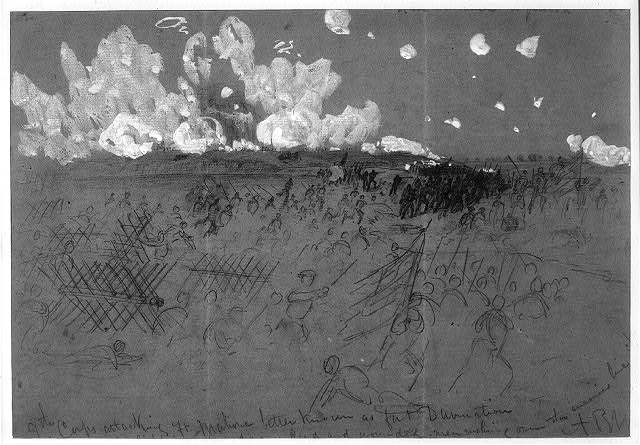
61st Massachusetts Infantry attacking Fort Mahone April 1865

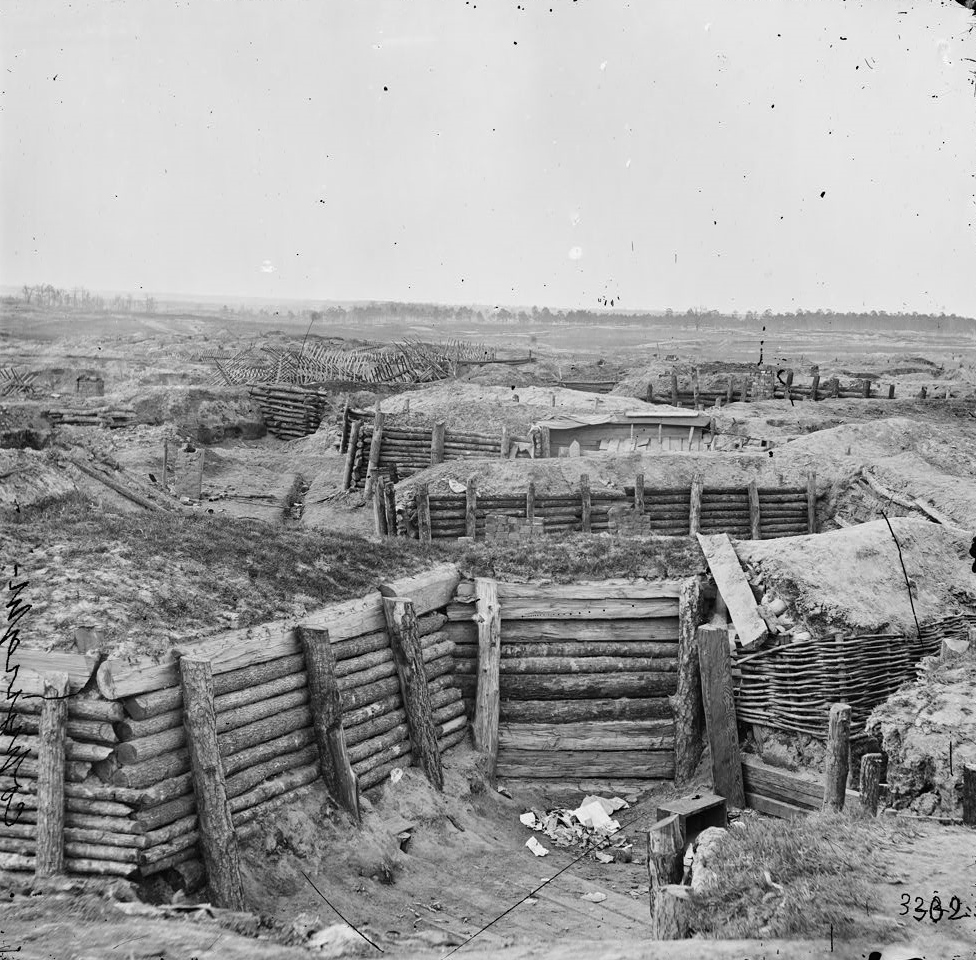
Confederate defenses of Fort Mahone aka Battery 29 at Petersburg, Virginia, 1865

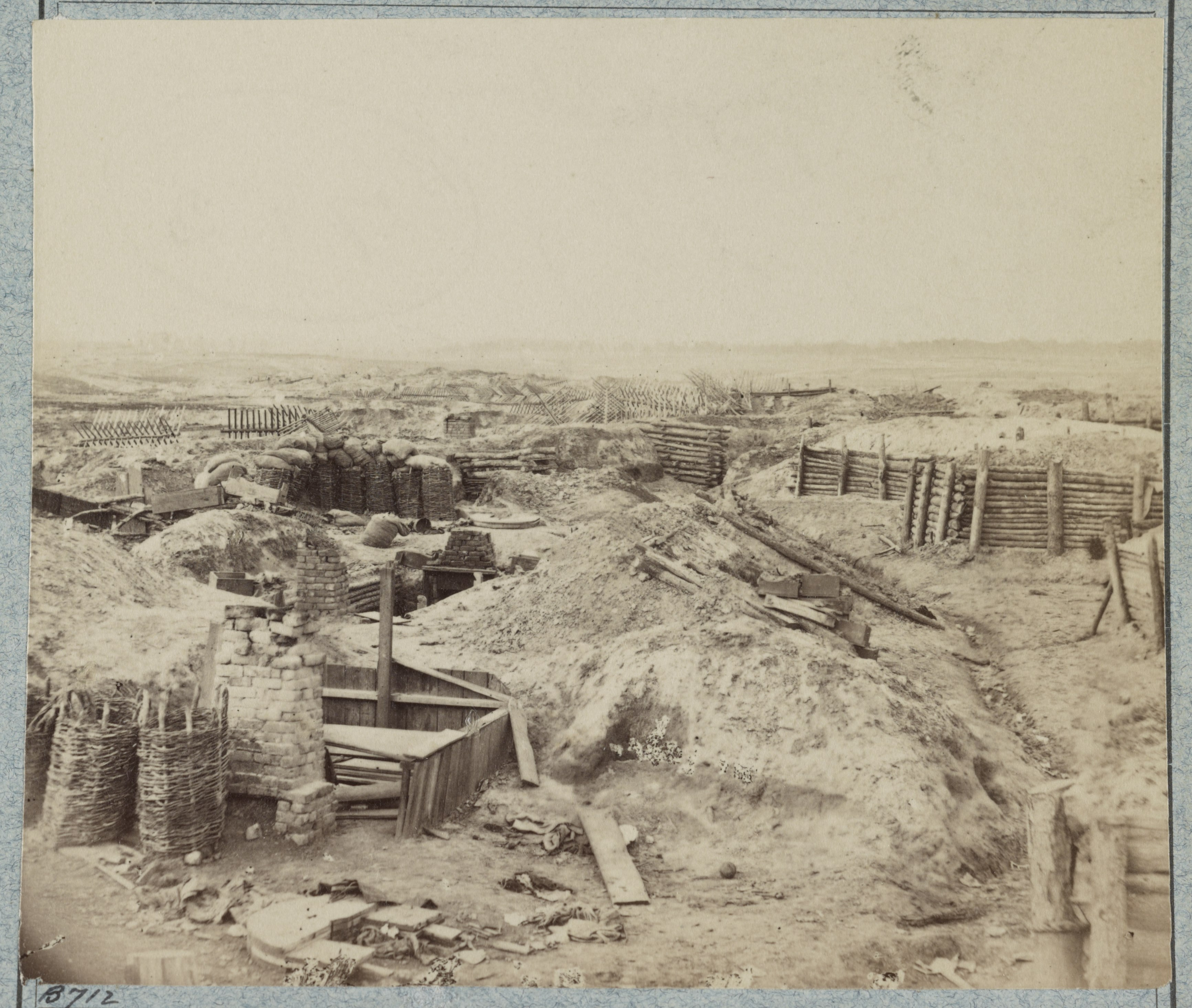
Interior of Fort Mahone in 1865 also known as "Fort Damnation"

The Union Army's IX Corps under Major General John G. Parke occupied the original trenches east of Petersburg that were captured in June 1864. Facing Parke was a strong Confederate position along the Jerusalem Plank Road dominated by Fort Mahone (strengthened from the former Battery 29 and named after Major General William Mahone; also known as "Fort Damnation"), covered by batteries in six redoubts and manned by the forces of Major General John B. Gordon. The fort was connected to the main Confederate line by a covered way. The Confederates had built a strong secondary line about 0.25 miles (0.40 km) behind their main line. Union Fort Sedgwick was about 500 yards (460 m) from Fort Mahone.

Since much of the recent action had occurred west of Petersburg, in particular the Battle of Five Forks, the Confederate strength due south and east of Petersburg was considerably weakened. Gordon noted only 5,500 men were available to hold over 6 miles (9.7 km) of line. Major General Bryan Grimes's division of 2,200 men held 3.5 miles (5.6 km) of line between the Crater and Battery No. 45, including the defenses around Fort Mahone.

Although lightly manned, the positions between Batteries 25 and 30, especially Fort Mahone (Battery 29), where Parke was to attack, had been considerably strengthened since their initial construction. Even if unsuccessful on the morning of April 2, a simultaneous assault here would occupy these Confederate troops and prevent them from being shifted westward.

On the night of April 1, 1865 at 11:00 p.m., Parke sent men from Brigadier General Simon G. Griffin's brigade of Brigadier General (Brevet Major General) Robert B. Potter's division forward from a point near Fort Sedgwick (also known as "Fort Hell") to take Grimes's picket line. They captured 249 officers and men, about half of Colonel Edwin L. Hobson's brigade in the process. Parke was still quite concerned about trying to assault these works and pointedly asked that the offensive be cancelled since the element of surprise had been lost. Early artillery fire starting at 10:00 p.m. on April 1 and the attack on the picket line and subsequent skirmishing had put the defenders on alert.

When Parke did not receive a favorable reply to his request for cancellation of the assault, he prepared to send 18 regiments forward. Brigadier General Robert B. Potter's division was to the west of the Jerusalem Plank Road. Brigadier General (Brevet Major General) John F. Hartranft's division was to the east on the right of Fort Sedgwick. Brigadier General (Brevet Major General) Orlando B. Willcox sent three regiments from his division to cover Hartranft's right flank with the rest of his regiments in reserve but demonstrating between the Crater and the Appomattox River, with the 1st Michigan Sharpshooters Regiment and the 46th New York Infantry Regiment of Willcox’s 2nd Brigade attacking Confederate positions and holding Confederate lines for two hours before being told to withdraw after the demonstration. Potter and Hartranft both put axmen in front of their forces to dismantle obstructions.

Parke's attackers moved forward into a mist at about 4:00 a.m. Thomas P. Beals, with three companies of the 31st Maine Infantry Regiment, led the attack of Potter's division on Battery No. 28 after the pioneers chopped through the chevaux-de-frise. The ditch in front of the battery was filled with water so after some Union attackers fell in, others moved around the west side of the battery and captured its small garrison. Taking artillery fire from the secondary Confederate line, the Union troops then moved along the main line toward Fort Mahone. Hartranft's division had similar success taking Battery No. 27. Harriman's three regiments from Willcox's division took five guns and 68 prisoners at Battery No. 25.

The Union attackers captured Miller's salient but then had to fight from traverse to traverse along the trenches. Cornelius Robinson Jr. led the 3rd Regiment Alabama Infantry to the right when Hartranft's and Harriman's men got to the line, positioning them so that the Union attackers could be enfiladed by artillery fire from the second Confederate line. Robinson's men shot the attackers as they emerged from the traverse to their east until the Confederates had to retreat after running out of ammunition.

Colonel Edwin A. Nash's troops of Brigadier General Philip Cook's Georgia Brigade held their ground east of the Jerusalem Plank Road, but Potter's soldiers widened it west of Jerusalem Plank Road by attacking Fort Mahone. The fort was placed on a slight ridge and filled with obstructions and sandbags. Union Colonel (Brevet Brigadier General) John I. Curtin's brigade assaulted the fort from the rear as well as across the ditch and over the parapet, capturing three guns and several prisoners. The four Union regiments in the fort could not expand their occupation of the Confederate works much farther west as they were subjected to artillery fire from the second Confederate line. By this time Potter had been severely wounded and was succeeded in command by Brigadier General Simon Griffin.

The Confederates withdrew west from Fort Mahone to a position between the fort and Battery No. 30 occupied by the 53rd North Carolina of Colonel David G. Cowand's brigade. The Confederates jumped on top of a large traverse between the fort and the battery to fire down on the Union attackers.

Parke's men took Batteries No. 25, 27, 28, and 29 (Fort Mahone) and the trenches connecting these works, but the attack then bogged down after Parke's corps had taken only about 500 yards (460 m) of the Confederate forward line. Bryan Grimes held the second line opposite these works with two battalions of Virginia Reserves under Fletcher Archer and elements of Cowand's brigade, supported by field guns taken from Battery No. 30.

Confederate counterattacks led to bitter fighting, traverse to traverse, as the afternoon continued. Soldiers from both sides jumped on top of the traverses, which often were ten feet tall and twenty feet thick, to fire into the crowd on the other side.

Grimes made a second push at 1:00 p.m. to recapture the lost ground, which led Parke to call for reinforcements from the VI Corps. Grimes made a third push at 3:00 p.m., which recaptured a portion of Fort Mahone and sections of Union-occupied trenches east of Jerusalem Plank Road. Colonel (Brevet Brigadier General) Charles H. T. Collis's Independent Brigade counterattacked to stabilize the situation for the Union troops and to reoccupy the line east of Fort Mahone.

The Union force lost 1,500 men in these assaults. (Note: Greene 2008, p 339 states that Hartranft lost 594 men, Harriman lost 184 and Potter (Griffin) 722.) Confederate casualties are unknown, although General Humphreys reported that Parke claimed 800 prisoners, 12 guns and some flags were captured along with the Confederate works.

When the fighting ended that evening, the stalemated armies held alternating sections of the Confederate works in this sector. Major General Gordon asked General Lee if it was worth trying to recapture about 200 yards of the forward line and a portion of Fort Mahone still held by Parke. A staff officer told him that the army would likely evacuate Petersburg that night. In accordance with Lee's evacuation timetable, Gordon began to remove his men from the trenches at 9:00 p.m.

=== White Oak Road, Hatcher's Run Line ===
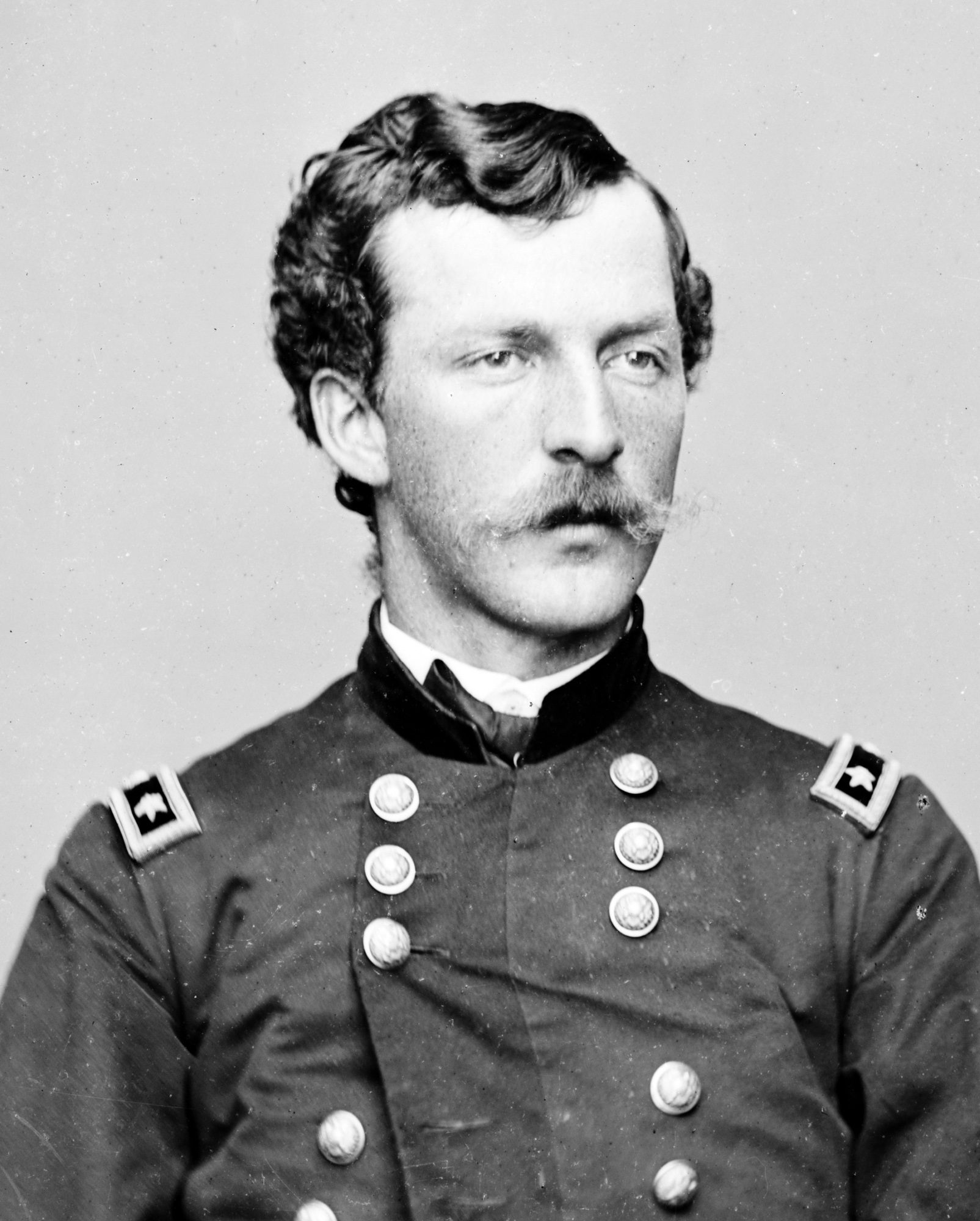
Brigadier General (Brevet Major General) Nelson A. Miles

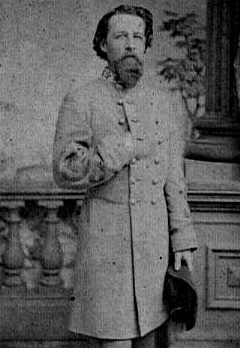
Brigadier General John R. Cooke

Major General Andrew A. Humphreys's II Corps faced the division of Major General Henry Heth in the line running from Hatcher's Run to White Oak Road. After the Union victory at the Battle of Five Forks on April 1, in response to Grant's 9:00 p.m. order for an immediate assault on the Confederate lines, Humphreys ordered Nelson A. Miles's and Gershom Mott's divisions to attack at once. They could not do more than drive in the Confederate pickets as Confederate artillery opened up on them. Then, as Grant had ordered, Miles's division was sent to Sheridan just before midnight but Mott's and Hays's divisions continued probing the Confederate line.

At 6:00 a.m. on April 2, in view of the report of the VI Corps' successful advance, Humphreys ordered Hays to assault the redoubts opposite the II Corps' line, including the Crow House redoubt beside Hatcher's Run. The attack captured the Confederate redoubts, their artillery and the majority of their garrisons. At about 7:30 a.m. Mott captured the Confederate picket line at Burgess's Mill and at 8:30 a.m. Mott sharply attacked the Confederate trenches on their right flank, which then were rapidly evacuated. By 8:30 a.m., Humphrey's divisions held the Confederate works from Burgess's Mill to Claiborne Road. The retreating defenders withdrew to the northwest to Sutherland's Station.

At 9:00 a.m., Humphreys received word from Miles that he was returning and had reached a point about 2 miles (3.2 km) west of Claiborne Road on White Oak Road. Humphreys ordered Miles, Mott and Hays to pursue the Confederates by Claiborne Road toward Sutherland's Station where he expected to hit the rear of the enemy's force consisting of Brigadier Generals Samuel McGowan's, William MacRae's, Alfred Moore Scales's (Note: Greene, 2008, p. 321 identifies Scales's brigade as under the command of Colonel Joseph H. Hyman but under the temporary command of Lieutenant Colonel Thomas S. Galloway, Jr. on April 2.) and John R. Cooke's brigades of Hill's corps, under Major General Henry Heth, and Lieutenant General Richard H. Anderson's command consisting of Bushrod Johnson's and George Pickett's divisions and Fitzhugh Lee's cavalry. General Meade did not approve of this action and ordered Humphreys to move his men toward Petersburg and connect with General Wright.

Humphreys met Miles's division at Sutherland's Station only to find that it had just come up on Heth's division and was forced to give battle. Miles was convinced he could defeat Heth's force, now under the command of Brigadier General John Cooke because Heth had been called to Petersburg to take charge of A.P. Hill's corps due to Hill's death. Later, Humphreys said he met Sheridan at the time he met Miles and that Sheridan said Miles was still under his command. Sheridan later said that he relinquished command to Humphreys. In any event, Humphreys and Sheridan left Miles alone, with about 8,000 troops in four brigades, to the task of fighting Cooke's force at the Battle of Sutherland's Station. Humphreys then went back to join his two other divisions on the road to Petersburg. Without support from the rest of the II Corps or the V Corps, Miles would soon face a hard task against the well-positioned Confederates.

Cooke, who had four brigades totaling about 1,200 men, had been ordered by Heth to protect the supply trains already parked at Sutherland's Station. Heth left Cooke in command before the battle started to report to Lee's headquarters. Cooke's men threw up a slender line of earthworks about 0.5 miles (0.80 km) long along Cox Road parallel to the railroad with an open field about 700 yards (640 m) with a slight slope in front. Heth had placed Cooke's men on favorable ground between Sutherland Tavern and Ocran Methodist Church with a refused left flank and sharpshooters deployed in front as skirmishers. The entire Confederate force at Sutherland's Station was estimated by a staff officer at about 4,000 men.

Miles first attacked Cooke and Hyman (Scales) with only Colonel (Brevet Brigadier General) Henry J. Madill's brigade. Madill's men were exhausted from a night and morning of marching and Madill himself was severely wounded as the attack was repulsed despite a determined showing by the attackers. Then, Miles attacked MacRae and McGowan again with Madill's brigade, now under the command of Colonel (Brevet Brigadier General) Clinton McDougall and Colonel Robert Nugent's brigade. The two brigades again were repulsed with Colonel McDougall being wounded. After an interval to regroup, Miles finally overcame the Confederate right with an attack at 4:00 p.m. by a strong skirmish line, MacDougall's and Nugent's brigades and Lieutenant Colonel (Brevet Brigadier General) John Ramsey's brigade, capturing 600 prisoners, two guns and a battle flag. (Note: Greene, 2008, p. 327 states that Miles wrote that the time of the attack was 2:45 p.m.)

When McGowan's men finally gave way, Cooke's brigades collapsed from east to west although Cooke's own brigade was farthest from the end of the line and withdrew in better order than the other survivors who managed to escape. The Confederates who did not become casualties or prisoners retreated toward the Appomattox River, moving mostly in disorder toward Amelia Court House. The South Side Railroad, the final supply line to Petersburg, had been permanently severed by the Union Army. But most of Miles men were too exhausted to pursue the Confederate fugitives. (Note: Greene, 2008, p. 331 does point out that Colonel George W. Scott's brigade had not been committed to the battle and was relatively fresh.) Besides, Miles understood that Sheridan had ordered his men to drive the enemy toward Petersburg, so he turned his division in that direction.

At 2:30 p.m., Meade learned of Miles's difficulties and ordered Humphreys to take one of his divisions back to Sutherland's Station to support Miles. By the time Humphrey's arrived back at Sutherland's Station with Hays's division, he found out that Miles's final attack had been successful. Miles and Hays camped near Sutherland's Station to protect the railroad. Humphreys later wrote that the whole Confederate force probably would have been captured if the II Corps had been able to continue to Sutherland's Station that morning.

Other than the 600 taken prisoners, Confederate casualties at Sutherland's Station are unknown. Miles had 366 casualties.

Sheridan's cavalry and the V Corps did little more than occupy the vacated works along White Oak Road after both the Confederates and the II Corps left the area.

=== Casualties ===
The Union forces lost 3,936 men on April 2, 1865. Confederate casualties were at least 5,000, most of whom were taken prisoner. After the Petersburg trenches were overrun, many Union soldiers were shocked to discover the bodies of old men and boys as young as 14 in them, evidence of how desperate the Confederacy was for manpower.

Union Army Chief Engineer John G. Barnard estimated Union casualties in the VI Corps breakthrough at about 1,100 killed and wounded, "all of which occurred in the space of about fifteen minutes." Confederate casualties are unknown but the majority of them were taken prisoner rather than killed or wounded. General Grant estimated the VI Corps took about 3,000 prisoners, which historian A. Wilson Greene states is "probably not far wrong." Casualties at the other main actions of the day are noted above.

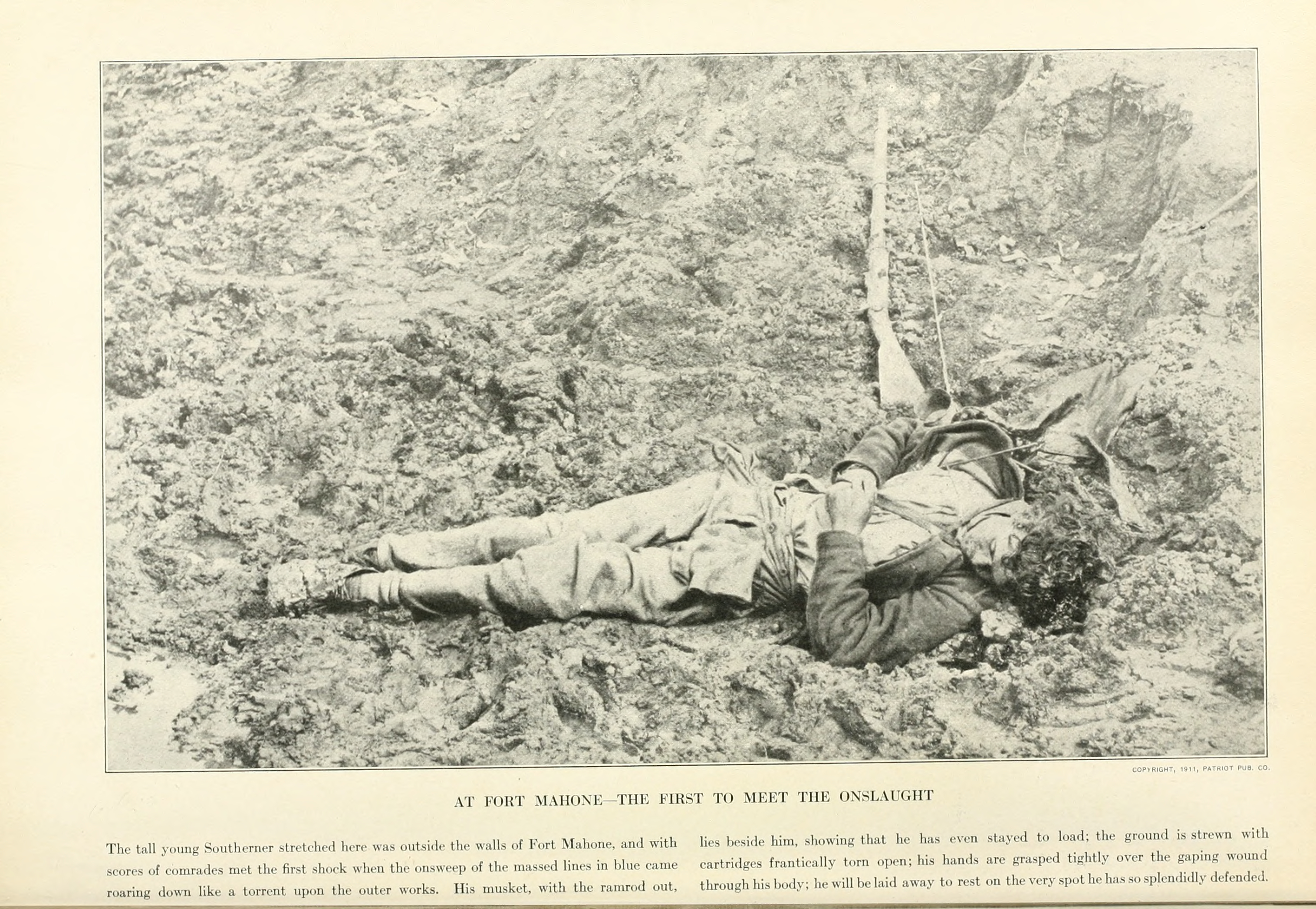
Confederate Casualty trenches at Petersburg April 1865

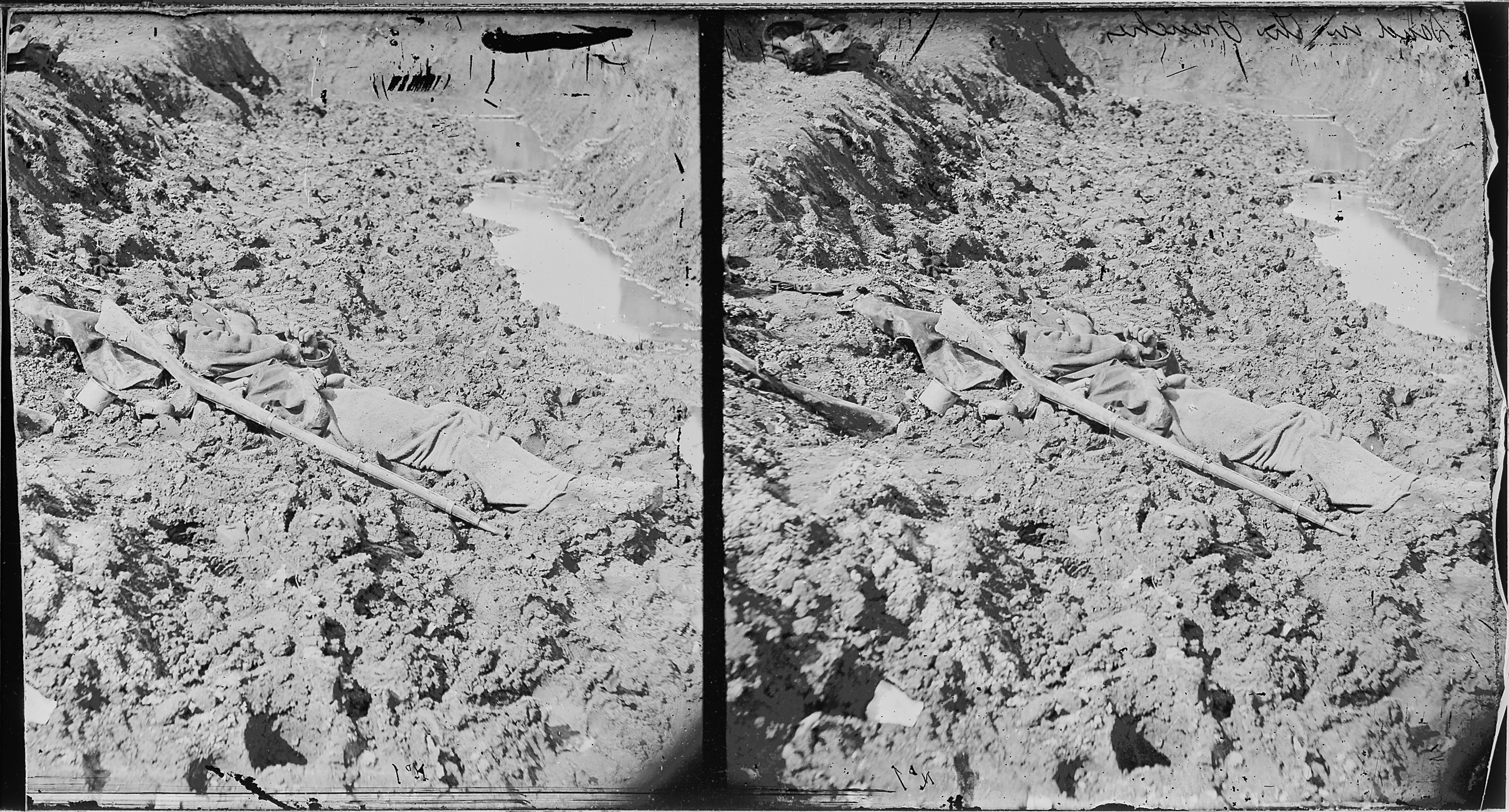
Dead Confederate soldier at Petersburg, Virginia, April 1865.

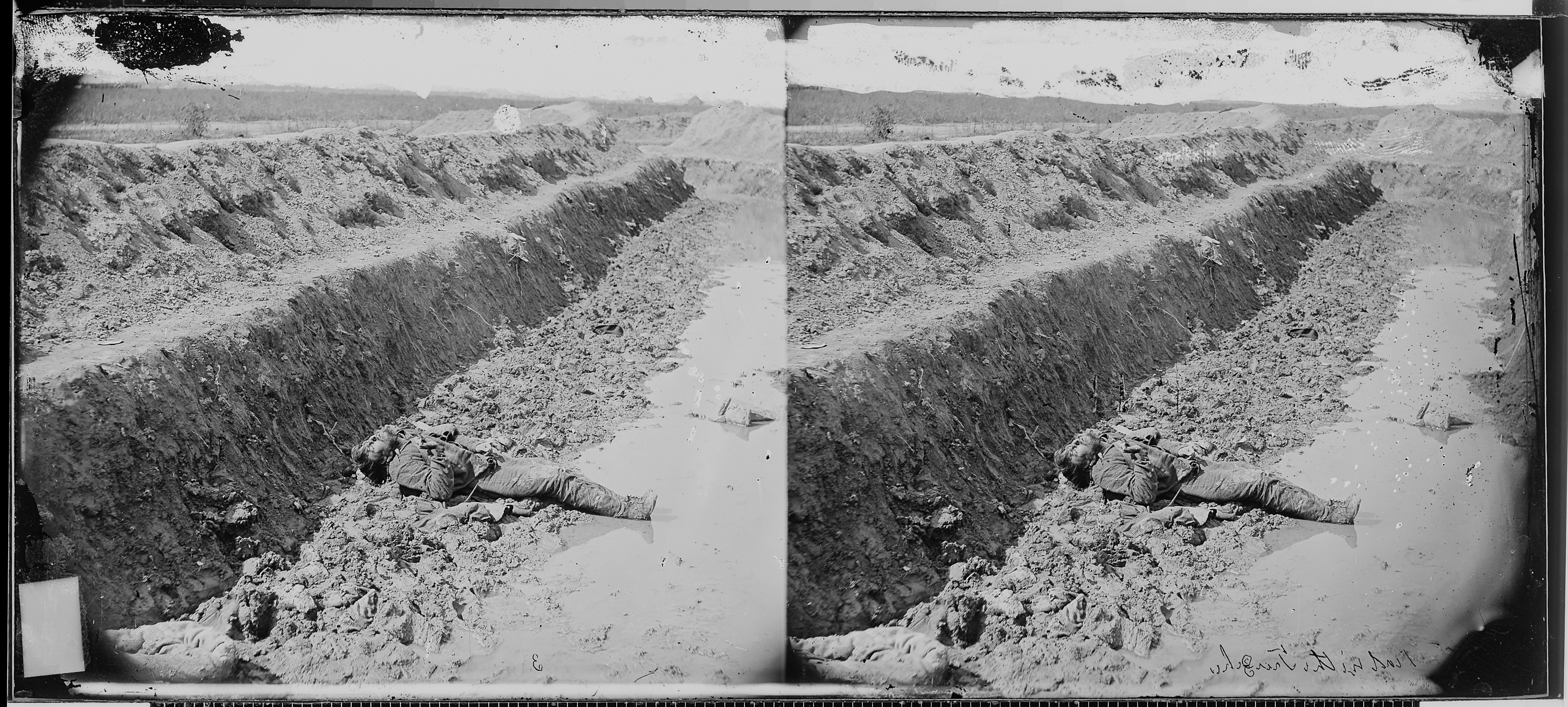
Dead Confederate soldier at Petersburg, Virginia, April 1865.

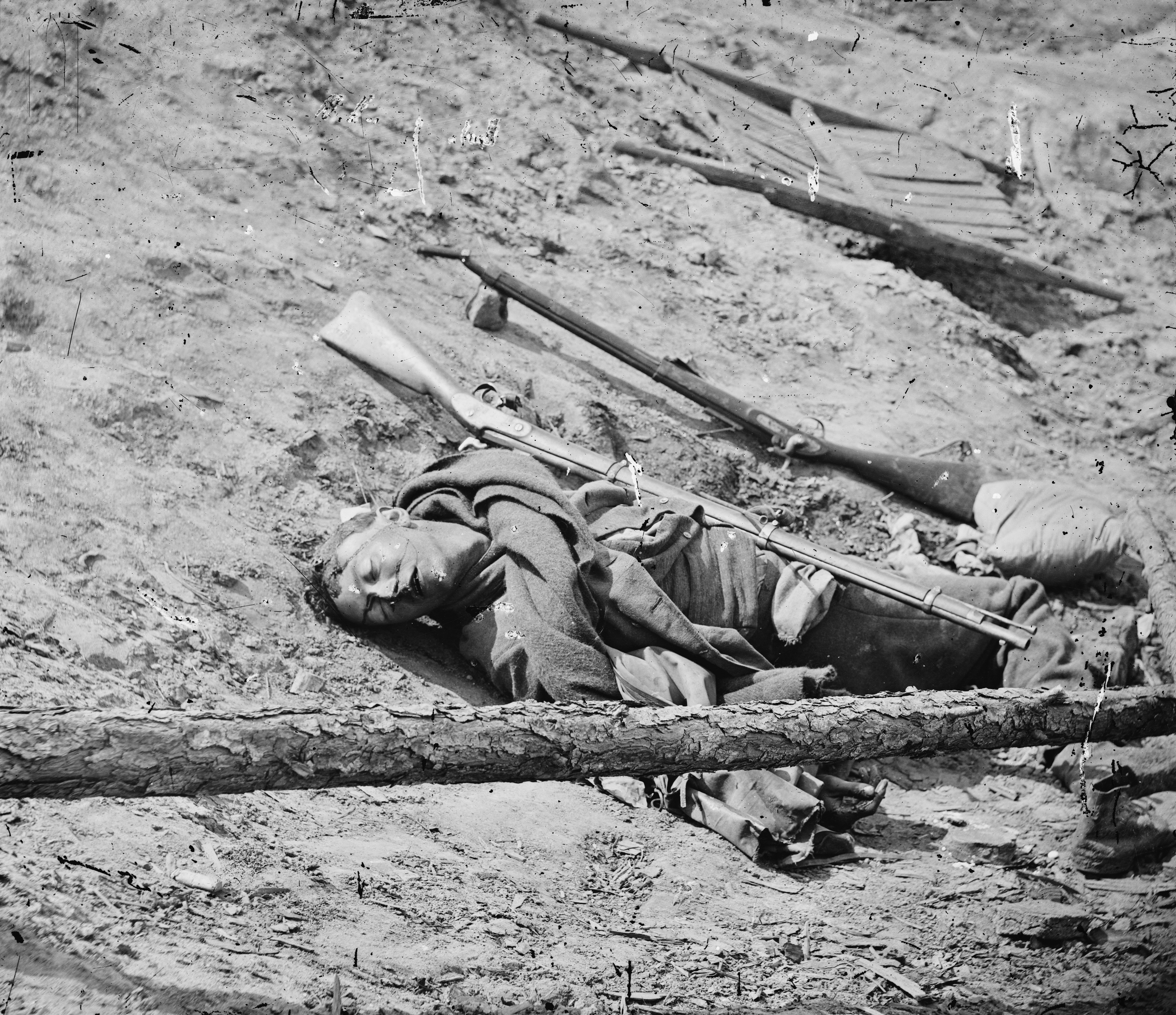
Dead Confederate soldier at Petersburg, Virginia, April 1865

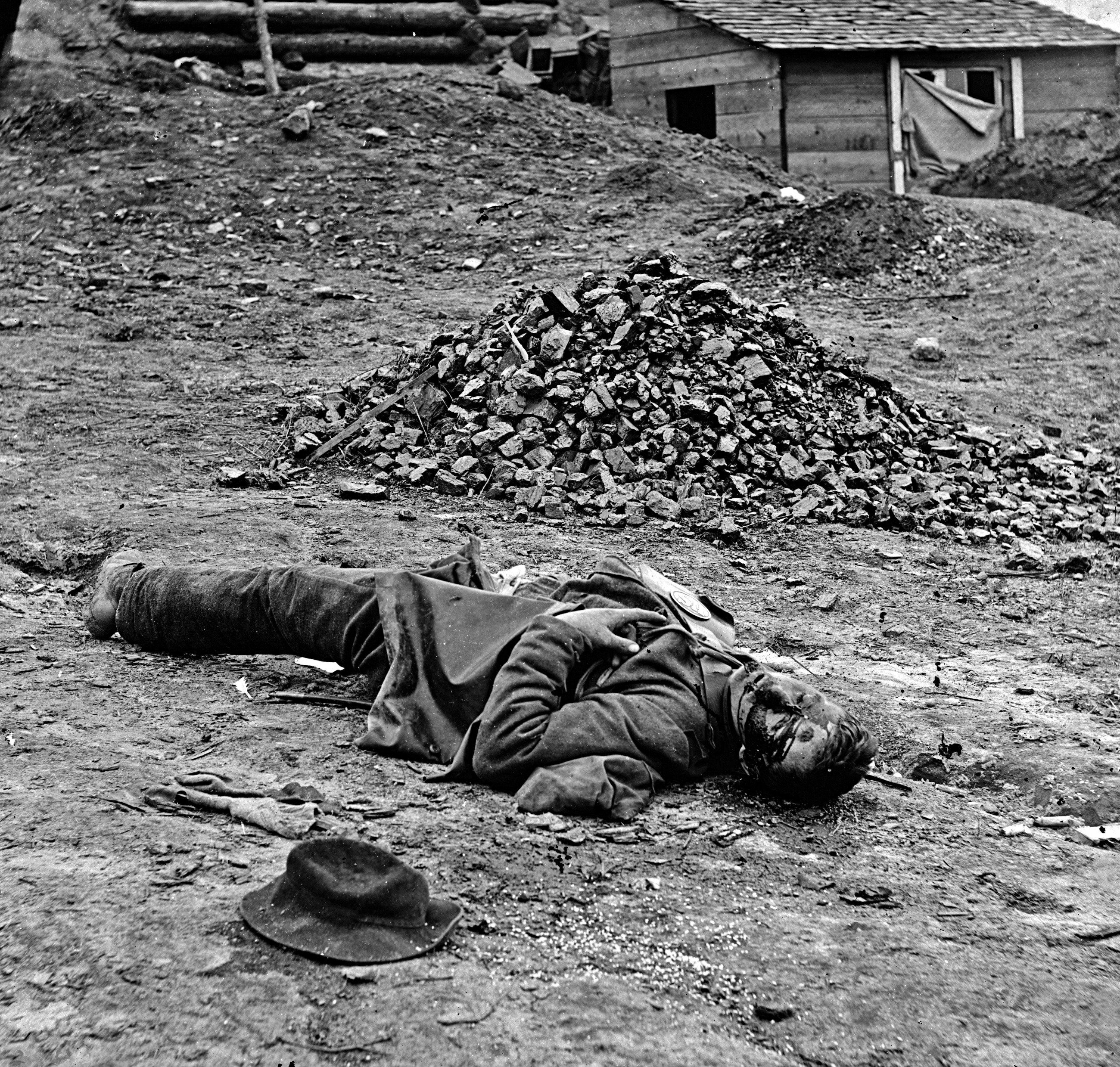
Dead Confederate soldier at Petersburg, Virginia, April 1865

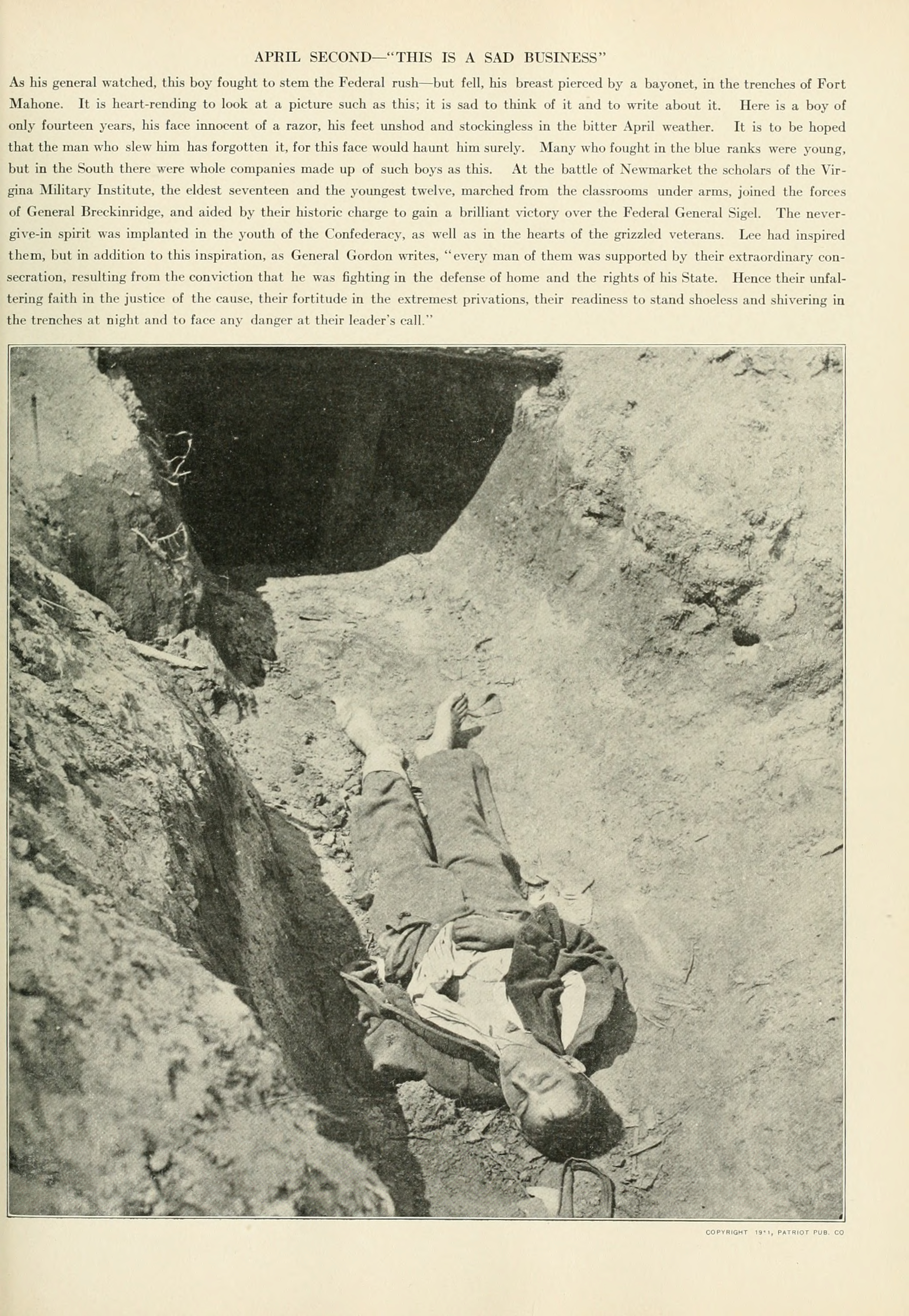
Confederate Casualty trenches at Petersburg April 1865

== Aftermath ==
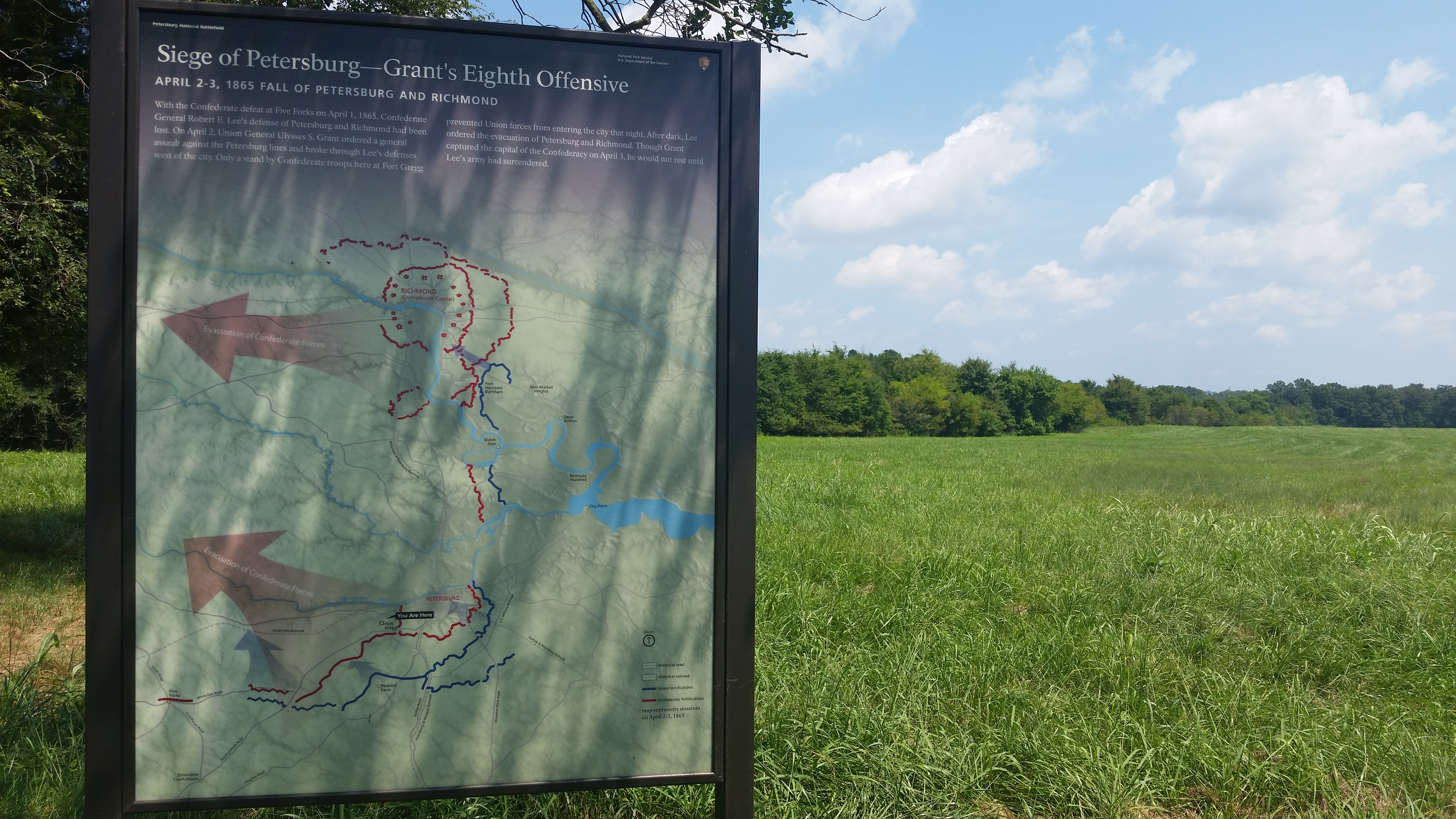
National Park Service marker for Fort Gregg

Wright's breakthrough severed the South Side Railroad near Petersburg. The Union Army had access to the Appomattox River and were free to cross the next day to threaten Lee's communications on the north side of the river.

At 3:00 p.m., Lee gave the orders for the retreat from Richmond and Petersburg, to begin at 8:00 p.m. Routes of withdrawal, including designation of bridges to cross to the north side of the Appomattox River, were drawn up by Colonel Thomas M.R. Talcott. Artillery preceded infantry. Wagon trains were to move on separate roads. Most trains and troops crossed to the north side of the Appomattox River by the railroad or railroad bridges. Amelia Court House was the designated assembly point for Lee's Army. Most of the army moved west on the north side of the Appomattox River but most of Anderson's command, including Pickett's and Bushrod Johnson's divisions and Fitzhugh Lee's cavalry moved on the south side of the river. (Note: Humphreys, 1883, pp. 371–372 identifies the routes taken by the Confederate forces as: "General Longstreet, with Field's division, and Heth's and Wilcox's divisions of Hill's corps, led the column, moving on the River road, intending to recross the river at Bevil's bridge, but that being out of order, used the pontoon bridge laid at Goode's bridge. General Gordon, taking the Hickory road, recrossed the Appomattox at Goode's bridge, following Longstreet, and Mahone's division, passing through Chesterfield Court House, also crossed at Goode's two shoes bridge, following Gordon. General Ewell's command, composed of General Kershaw's and General Custis Lee's divisions, crossed the James River at and below Richmond, and taking the Genito road, followed by Gary's cavalry, crossed the Appomattox by the Danville Railroad bridge. The larger part of General Anderson's command, composed of Pickett's and Bushrod Johnson's divisions, moved up along the south bank of the Appomattox, General Fitz Lee, with his cavalry, bringing up the rear.") Before the withdrawal, the Confederates disabled all heavy artillery but took about 200 light artillery pieces with them along with over 1,000 wagons.

By 11:00 p.m., Jefferson Davis, most of his cabinet, such records, boxes and baggage as could be carried and all the gold in the Confederate treasury left Richmond on a Richmond & Danville Railroad train headed for Danville, Virginia.

Generals Meade and Grant set up temporary headquarters along the Boydton Plank Road at Bank's house just north of the VI Corps breakthrough. Grant wrote to his wife on the night of April 2:

I am now writing from far inside of what was the rebel fortifications this morning but what are ours now. They are exceedingly strong and I wonder at the sucsess [sic] of our troops carrying them by storm. But they did it and without any great loss. Altogether this has been one of the greatest victories of the war. Greatest because it is over what the rebels have always regarded as their most invincable [sic] Army and the one used for the defence of their capital. We may have some more hard work but I hope not.

In preparation for a final assault on the Confederate lines and presumed capture of the city, Grant ordered a "furious bombardment" to begin at 5:00 a.m. the next day to be followed by an assault at 6:00 a.m. At 3:00 a.m., however, the Union commanders found out that Lee had abandoned his entrenchments, making a further assault on the Richmond and Petersburg lines unnecessary. Grant also wanted Sheridan to push the Fifth Corps and his cavalry north of the Appomattox as quickly as possible on April 3.

The Confederate capital of Richmond, now unprotected by Lee's army, fell to Union forces along with Petersburg on April 3, 1865. The first troops entering Petersburg being troops of MG Orlando B. Willcox 1st Division, Ninth Corps, with the 1st Michigan Sharpshooters Regiment, the 2nd Michigan Infantry Regiment, the 20th Michigan Infantry Regiment, and the 60th Ohio Infantry Regiment being the first troops into the city. Between 10:30 a.m. and 11:00 a.m., General Grant met with President Lincoln at the residence of Thomas Wallace, president of the Petersburg branch of the Exchange Bank of Virginia and a former Whig politician who had been acquainted with Lincoln in earlier years. When the meeting concluded about 90 minutes later, Lincoln started his return to City Point and Grant moved west to catch up with his army in pursuit of the Army of Northern Virginia.

The retreat that led to the surrender of the Army of Northern Virginia at Appomattox Court House, Virginia on April 9, 1865 had begun.
