= Thomas O. Osborn =

American lawyer

Thomas Ogden Osborn
- Born: August 11, 1832; Licking County, Ohio, US
- Died: March 27, 1904 (aged 71); Washington, D.C., US
- Burial place: Arlington National Cemetery
- Military career
- Allegiance: United States
- Branch: United States Army; Union Army
- Service years: 1861–1865
- Rank: Brigadier general Brevet major general
- Unit: Army of the James
- Commands: 1st Brigade, 1st Division, XXIV Corps
- Conflicts: American Civil War

Thomas O. Osborn

11th United States Minister to Argentina
- In office May 21, 1874 – c. October 15, 1885
- Preceded by: Julius White
- Succeeded by: Bayless W. Hanna

Thomas Ogden Osborn (August 11, 1832 – March 27, 1904) was an American lawyer, soldier, and diplomat who served as a general in the Union Army during the American Civil War. He was also the U.S. Minister to Argentina from 1874 to 1885.

== Early life and career ==
Thomas Osborn was born near the rural village of Jersey in Licking County, Ohio. In 1854 he graduated from Ohio University at Athens. Osborn studied law in Crawfordsville, Indiana, under future Civil War general Lew Wallace and moved to Chicago, where he established a law practice in 1858.

== Civil War service ==
After the start of the war, Osborn became the lieutenant colonel of the 39th Illinois Infantry on October 11, 1861, and was promoted to colonel the following year on January 1. He led the regiment in several campaigns and battles in the Eastern Theater.

Osborn and his command saw action in the 1862 Valley Campaign against Confederate forces under Lt. Gen. Thomas Jonathan "Stonewall" Jackson, participating in the Battle of Port Republic on June 9. From July until September 1863, Osborn took part in Union operations against Charleston, South Carolina, including attacks on Fort Wagner and Fort Sumter.

In 1864, Osborn commanded the 1st Brigade, 1st Division of the XXIV Corps of the Army of the James. Osborn was badly wounded at the Battle of Drewry's Bluff on May 14, 1864, when a musket ball shattered his right elbow and lodged in his arm. He stayed in the hospital until September before being released for duty. In December, he had recovered enough to report for duty. However, he suffered from ankylosis of the injured elbow for the rest of his life.

Osborn (seated, left) and his staff during the American Civil War

During the Siege of Petersburg in 1864 into 1865, Osborn led a brigade in the XXIV Corps. He was brevetted to the rank of brigadier general on March 10, 1865.

On April 2, 1865, Osborn's command was instrumental in the capture of Fort Gregg during the Union breakthrough, and he brevetted to major general to rank from that date. He was promoted to brigadier general in the United States Volunteers on May 1, 1865, and led the 1st Division of the XXIV Corps from May 2 – July 8. Osborn resigned from the Army on September 28.

== Postbellum career ==
Osborn returned to his legal practice in Chicago, engaged in several business ventures, and he also held several federally appointed positions. He was elected as the treasurer of Cook County, Illinois, serving from 1867 until 1869. He entered the State Department in 1874 after receiving a presidential appointment as the U.S. Minister to Argentina. He served in Buenos Aires until 1885. He was significant involved in the negotiations to the Boundary treaty of 1881 between Chile and Argentina.

In the spring of 1904, Osborn died in Washington, D.C., after suffering for ten hours from a massive cerebral hemorrhage that paralyzed him.

He is buried in Arlington National Cemetery.

== See also ==
- List of American Civil War generals (Union)
