= John I. Curtin =

Union Army general (1837–1911)

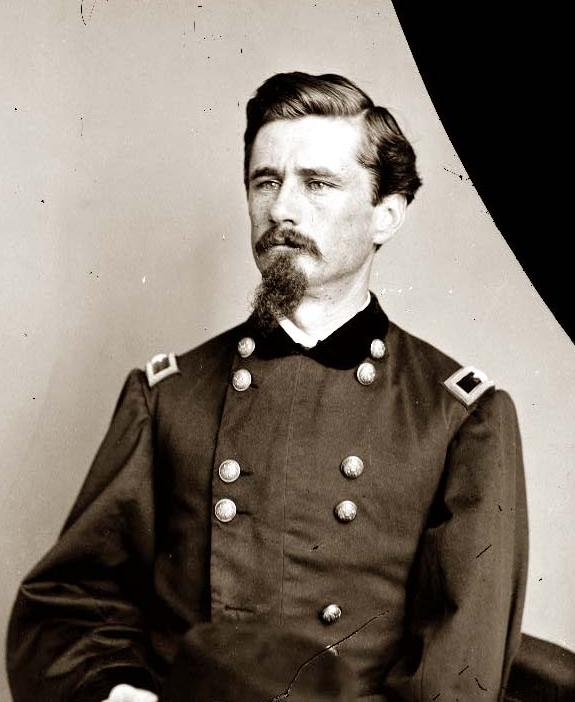
- John I. Curtin
- Born: June 17, 1837; Eagle Forge, Pennsylvania
- Died: January 1, 1911 (aged 73); Bellefonte, Pennsylvania
- Burial place: Union Cemetery, Bellefonte, Pennsylvania
- Relatives: Cousin of Gov. Andrew Gregg Curtin
- Military career
- Allegiance: United States of America; Union
- Branch: United States Army; Union Army
- Service years: 1861–1865
- Rank: Colonel; Brevet Brigadier General
- Commands: 45th Pennsylvania Infantry
- Conflicts: American Civil War: Battle of South Mountain; Battle of Antietam; Battle of Fredericksburg; Siege of Vicksburg; Battle of the Wilderness; Battle of Cold Harbor; Siege of Petersburg

John Irvin Curtin (June 17, 1837 – January 1, 1911) was a cousin of Pennsylvania governor Andrew Gregg Curtin. He led a regiment and then a brigade in the American Civil War.

== Early life ==
Curtin was born at Eagle Forge, Pennsylvania. He was educated at Dickinson Seminary, later Lycoming College, and became a civil engineer.

== Civil War service ==
In 1861, Curtin served as a private in the 2nd Pennsylvania Infantry Regiment. On September 9, 1861, he was commissioned a captain in the 45th Pennsylvania Infantry. Curtin was promoted to major on July 30, 1862, and lieutenant colonel on September 4 of the same year. He became the regiment's colonel on April 13, 1863.

In the Army of the Potomac, Curtin served in IX Corps. He led the regiment at the Battle of South Mountain and the Battle of Antietam in the place of Col. Thomas Welsh, who was holding brigade command. Welsh return to command of the regiment for the Battle of Fredericksburg. When Welsh was promoted to the rank of brigadier general, Curtin became the regiment's commander. After IX Corps was transferred west, Curtin led the 45th Pennsylvania in the Siege of Vicksburg. He was absent, however, from the Knoxville Campaign.

When IX Corps returned to the Army of the Potomac in 1864, Curtin led his regiment at the Battle of the Wilderness in the 2nd Division of Brig. Gen. Robert B. Potter. Curtin took command of 1st Brigade, 2nd Division, on May 11, 1864, after Col. Zenas Bliss was injured at the Battle of Spotsylvania Court House. He led the brigade at the Battle of Cold Harbor and continued in command until June 18, when he was wounded in the Second Battle of Petersburg.

Curtin led his brigade again in the Siege of Petersburg from August 21 to January 13, 1865, before going on leave. (Col. Sumner Carruth led the brigade during Curtin's absence.) After this absence, Curtin resumed brigade command on February 11, serving until April 24. After the Confederate surrender, in the Department of Washington, Curtin led the 3rd Division, IX Corps, in place of Brig. Gen. John Hartranft from May 4 to July 8 and then his old brigade from July 8 to July 17, 1865.

On December 20, 1864, President Abraham Lincoln nominated Curtin for appointment to the grade of brevet brigadier general of volunteers, to rank from October 12, 1864, and the United States Senate confirmed the appointment on February 14, 1865. He was mustered out of the volunteer service on July 17, 1865.

== Post war ==
Curtin died in Bellefonte, Pennsylvania on January 1, 1911. He was buried at the Union Cemetery in Bellefonte.

== See also ==
- List of American Civil War brevet generals (Union)
