= 1st Michigan Sharpshooters Regiment =

- Michigan state flag
- Active: April 14, 1863, to July 28, 1865
- Country: United States
- Allegiance: Union
- Branch: Infantry
- Engagements: Morgan's Raid; Battle of the Wilderness; Battle of Spotsylvania Court House; Battle of Cold Harbor; Siege of Petersburg; Appomattox Campaign

Insignia
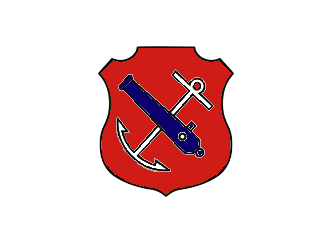
- 1st Division

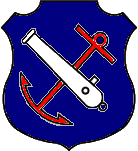
- 3rd Division

The 1st Michigan Sharpshooters Regiment was an infantry regiment that served in the Union Army's Army of the Potomac during the American Civil War. It is noted for being the first unit to push into and take Petersburg, Virginia, at the end of the Petersburg Campaign and the start of the Appomattox Campaign on April 3, 1865.

== Service ==
The 1st Michigan Sharpshooters was organized at Kalamazoo and Dearborn, Michigan, between April 14 and October 7, 1863, and six companies were mustered into Federal service on July 7, 1863, to serve three years.

=== Officers ===
Charles Victor DeLand, a Jackson, Michigan, journalist and politician on 10/15/1861 was commissioned as a captain into "C" Co. MI 9th Infantry. He resigned on 11/15/1862. On 7/7/1863 he was commissioned into Field & Staff MI 1st Sharpshooters as Colonel and charged with mustering the First Michigan Sharpshooters. He fought in many of the great battles in the Western Campaigns, was wounded in action three times, and was taken prisoner twice. His name, along with other faithful soldiers under his command, is inscribed on a stone monument dedicated on 10/1/1915 at the Michigan State Capitol in Lansing, MI that commemorates the First Michigan Sharpshooters. This monument, created by artist Frank D. Black, was authorized by the state legislature and funded by the surviving members of the regiment.

Colonel DeLand was discharged for wounds on 2/4/1865 He was listed as:

- POW 7/13/1862 Murfreesboro, TN
- Paroled 11/15/1862 (place not stated)
- Wounded 5/12/1864 Spotsylvania Court House, VA
- Joined Regiment 7/15/1864 (place not stated)
- Wounded 7/30/1864 Petersburg, VA
- POW 9/30/1864 Poplar Springs Church, VA (Paroled)
- Wounded 9/30/1864 Poplar Springs Church, VA

Promotions:

- Colonel 1/1/1863 (As of 1st MI SS)
- Brig-General 3/14/1865 by Brevet

Other Information: born 7/25/1828 in North Brookfield, MA died 9/21/1903 in Jackson, MI Sources used by Historical Data Systems, Inc.: - Record of Service of Michigan Volunteers 1861-65 - Dyer: A Compendium of the War of the Rebellion - Brevet Brigadier Generals in Blue - Heitman: Register of United States Army 1789-1903

Major John Piper, of Battle Creek, originally served as Captain of the famed Company D (The "Michigan Boys") of the Western Sharpshooters (W.S.S.) Regiment. Captain Piper resigned from the W.S.S. to take up the position of Major of the 1st Michigan Sharpshooters. He was killed in action at the Battle of Spottsylvania Courthouse, May 13, 1864.

The initial six companies were sent to Seymour, IN to repel the Morgan Raid where they were in contact with his raiders at North Vernon, July 13, and at Pierceville, July 14. After the successful rebuff of the raid, the regiment returned to Dearborn and trained there until August 16 when they moved to Chicago, to guarding prisoners-of-war (POWs) until March 17, 1864. The regiment was ordered to Annapolis, Md., March 17.

=== Company K ===
Of note, Company K was composed primarily of Native Americans of the United States, especially members of the Ojibwa, Odawa, and Potawatomi nations. In their first action at Although some members were armed with repeaters and breech-loaders, and despite Colonel Deland's attempts to requisition 700 Henrys for the regiment, the majority remained armed with Springfield Model 1861 rifled muskets. The unit distinguished itself in its skirmishing ability, infiltration ability, and marksmanship.

The regiment was highly trained in its combat skills, and the Indian men in Company K were recognized as the most accomplished. In their first combat at The Wilderness,

They, on the very first day at the front, caught on to the great advantage our enemy employed over us in the color of uniform. Ours was blue, and could be seen at a long distance; while the "Johnny" (as we called them) could not be spotted at a comparatively short distance, even when lying in an open field.

This disadvantage to us was appreciated almost immediately that these Indians got in the field, and they would go out and find a dry spot of earth and roll in it until their uniform was the complete color of the ground before going out on the skirmish line; and if the day was wet, they would not hesitate to take mud and rub it over their clothes, for as soon as this dried a little they would have what they were after—the color of the earth. This custom was adopted by my whole Regiment; and it was often remarked that our Regiment could do the closest skirmishing at the least cost of any Regiment in the Division.

Sgt. Thomas Ke-chi-ti-go, called "Big Tom" by the white Sharpshooters, further "ordered each brave to cover his breast and head with twigs and leaves to prevent contrast of color with their surroundings.

Through its service, the regiment was esteemed for its solid, dependable, and effective conduct. It provided valuable sniping, counter-sniping, and harassment fire during the Siege of Petersburg. It was noted for its "splendid work" in the debacle of the Battle of the Crater on 30 July 1864. Many other Union soldiers noticed mortally wounded Native American members of Company K, "... drawing their blouses over their faces, they chanted a death song and died — four of them a group."

=== Order of battle ===
The 1st was one of the first units to enter Petersburg after it finally fell on April 1, 1865.

The regiment was attached to the following:

- 2nd Brigade, 3rd Division, IX Corps, Army of the Potomac, to September, 1864.
- 2nd Brigade, 1st Division, IX Corps, to July, 1865

The 1st Michigan Sharpshooters' detailed service is as follows (NOTE — Battles are Bolded, Italicized; campaigns are Italicized):

==== 1863 ====
- Organizing at Kalamazoo and Dearborn, MI to 7 July
- Six companies sent to repel Morgan's Raid, the Confederate army's major incursion into Indiana 7 July
- North Vernon, Ind., July 13
- Pierceville, July 14
- To Dearborn, 15 July
- Camp Douglas, Chicago, guarding POWs until 7 March 1864

==== 1864 ====
- Ordered to Annapolis 17 Mar
- Duty in Annapolis until April 23, 1864.
- Overland Campaign May 4-June 15
- **Battle of the Wilderness** May 5–7. — In Christ's 2nd Brigade, Wilcox's 3rd Division, Burnside's IX Corps. Lost 25 men: 11 killed or died of wounds, 13 wounded, and 1 missing
- Spottsylvania May 8–12
- Ni River May 10
- **Battle of Spottsylvania Court House** May 12–21. — In Humphrey's 2nd Brigade, Wilcox's 3rd Division, Burnside's IX Corps. Lost 155 men: 34 killed or died of wounds, 117 wounded, and 4 missing
- **Assault on the Salient** May 12
- North Anna River May 23–26.
- Ox Ford May 23–24.
- On line of the Pamunkey May 26–28.
- Totopotomoy May 28–31.
- **Battle of Cold Harbor** June 1–12.— In Christ's 2nd Brigade, Wilcox's 3rd Division, Burnside's IX Corps.
- Bethesda Church June 1–3
- Siege of Petersburg June 16, 1864, to April 2, 1865.
- **Second Battle of Petersburg** June 16–18. — In Christ's (wounded June 17)/Raultson's (wounded June 18)/Travers' (wounded June 18)/Newberry's 2nd Brigade, 2nd Brigade, Wilcox's 3rd Division, Burnside's IX Corps.
- **Battle of the Crater** Petersburg, July 30, 1864.— In Humphrey's 2nd Brigade, Wilcox's 3rd Division, Burnside's IX Corps.
- **Battle of Globe Tavern** August 18–21. — In Humphrey's 2nd Brigade, Wilcox's 3rd Division, Burnside's IX Corps.
- **Battle of Peebles's Farm** September 29-October 2. — In Hartranft's 2nd Brigade, Wilcox's 1st Division, Burnside's IX Corps.
- Reconnaissance on Vaughan and Squirrel Level Roads October 8
- **Battle of Boydton Plank Road** October 27–28.— In Cutcheon's 2nd Brigade, Wilcox's 1st Division, Burnside's IX Corps.

==== 1865 ====
- **Battle of Fort Stedman**, Petersburg, March 25, 1865. — In Ely's 2nd Brigade, Wilcox's 1st Division, Parke's IX Corps
- Appomattox Campaign March 28-April 9
- Assault on and fall of Petersburg April 2.
- First unit into Petersburg April 2.
- Occupation of Petersburg April 3.
- Pursuit of Lee April 3–9
- Moved to Washington, D. C., April 22–27.
- Grand Review May 23.
- Camp near Washington, D. C., till July 28.
- Mustered out July 28, 1865.

== Total strength and casualties ==
The regiment suffered 6 officers and 131 enlisted men who were killed in action or mortally wounded and 165 enlisted men who died of disease, for a total of 362 fatalities.

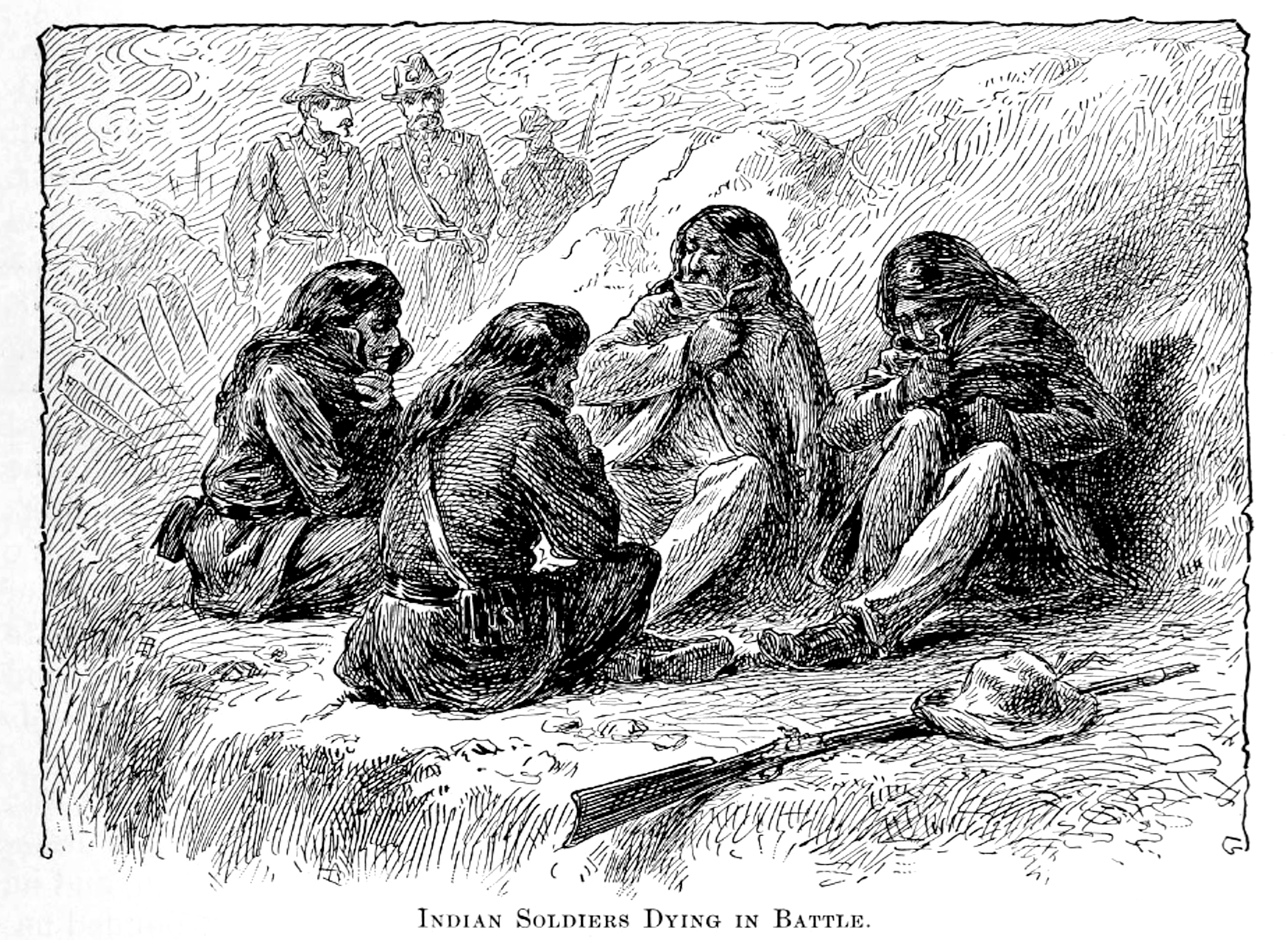
Four First Nation Members of Company K, 1st Michigan Sharpshooters chanting their death songs at the Battle of the Crater

== Commanders ==
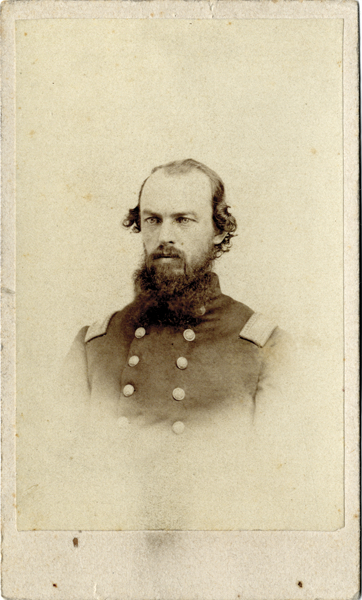
Col. Charles V. DeLand

- Colonel Charles Victor DeLand held nominal command of the regiment from its initial muster until his discharge for disability, on 4 February 1865. Because of wounds, incarceration as a POW, hospitalization, and brief stints as brigade commander, he spent only a portion of this time in active command. DeLand was promoted to Brevet Brigadier General for "faithful, gallant, and meritorious service" on 14 March 1865.
- Captain Levant Rhines actively commanded the regiment from 14 May 1864 until killed in action, 17 June 1864. He was posthumously promoted to major.
- Captain Elmer Dicey actively commanded the regiment from Rhines' death until 15 July 1864. He also commanded the regiment during the Battle of the Crater, 30 July 1864, during which he was captured.
- Captain George Murdock actively commanded the regiment from 30 September 1864, when Colonel DeLand was wounded and captured, until November 1864. He resigned on 12 December 1864. Murdock was promoted to Brevet Major on 4 December 1864.
- Major Asahel Nichols actively commanded the regiment from 12 November 1864 until February 1865, when he assumed full command. He was promoted to lieutenant colonel in March, and remained in command until 2 April 1865, when he was seriously wounded. He was promoted to Brevet Colonel for his "conspicuous gallantry" that day.
- Several officers briefly commanded the regiment during the ensuing battle on 2 April 1865, among them, Captain James DeLand, and Captain Leverette C. Case, who assumed command after DeLand was wounded. Both men were promoted to Brevet Major for their actions that day.
- Captain (later Brevet Major) Ira Evans commanded the regiment from 3 April until 27 April 1865.
- Major and Brevet Lieutenant Colonel Edward J. Buckbee commanded the regiment from 27 April until the Sharpshooters mustered out, 28 July 1865.

== Notable Members ==
- Lieutenant Colonel William Henry Harrison Beadle- Original Lieutenant Colonel of the regiment, transferred to the Veterans Reserve Corps due to illness and became a brigade commander in the Washington D.C. area and was breveted Brigadier General. After the war became President of Dakota State University.
- Captain Charles G. Conn Company H — founder of C.G. Conn Ltd. instrument company, one of only six men to be retroactively awarded the silver citation star on the Civil War Campaign Medal
- First Sergeant Charles H. De Puy Company H — for working guns in a rebel fort during Battle of the Crater
- Corporal Sidney Haight Company E — instead of retreating he exposed himself to Confederate fire, remaining in the captured position and deliberately returned fire until the enemy was close upon him.
- Private Charles M. Thatcher Company B — instead of retreating or surrendering when the works were captured, regardless of his personal safety, Private Thatcher continued to return the enemy's fire until he was captured.
- Corporal Benjamin Franklin Young|Benjamin F. Youngs — Capture of flag of 35th North Carolina Infantry (C.S.A.)

== See also ==
- List of Michigan Civil War Units
- Michigan in the American Civil War
