= 45th Pennsylvania Infantry Regiment =

Union Army infantry regiment

45th Pennsylvania Volunteer Infantry
- Pennsylvania flag
- Active: July 28, 1861 – July 17, 1865
- Country: United States of America
- Allegiance: Union
- Branch: Infantry
- Engagements: Battle of Secessionville; Battle of South Mountain; Battle of Antietam; Battle of Fredericksburg; Siege of Vicksburg; Siege of Jackson; Knoxville Campaign; Rapidan Campaign; Battle of the Wilderness; Battle of Spotsylvania Court House; Battle of North Anna; Battle of Totopotomoy Creek; Battle of Cold Harbor; Siege of Petersburg; Battle of the Crater; Battle of Globe Tavern; Battle of Boydton Plank Road; Battle of Fort Stedman; Appomattox Campaign; Third Battle of Petersburg

Insignia
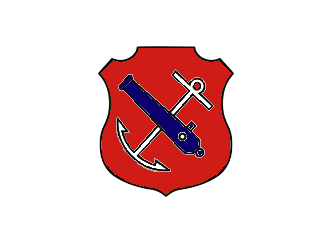
- 1st Brigade, 1st Division, IX Corps (Union Army), Army of the Potomac/Army of the Ohio/Army of the Tennessee

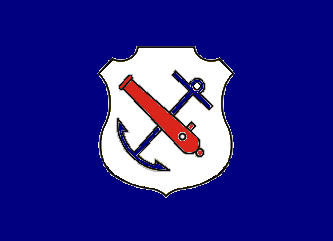
- 1st Brigade, 2nd Division, IX Corps (Union Army), Army of the Potomac

The 45th Pennsylvania Volunteer Infantry was an infantry regiment that served in the Union Army during the American Civil War.

== Service ==
The 45th Pennsylvania Infantry was organized beginning July 28, 1861 and mustered in October 21, 1861 at Camp Curtin in Harrisburg, Pennsylvania for a three-year enlistment under the command of Colonel Thomas Welsh.

The 45th Pennsylvania Infantry mustered out July 17, 1865.

== Affiliations, battle honors, detailed service, and casualties ==
=== Organizational affiliation ===
Attached to:

- Jamison's Brigade, Heintzelman's Division, Army of the Potomac, to October 1861.
- Department of the South, to July, 1862.
- 2nd Brigade, 1st Division. IX Corps, AoP, to September, 1862.
- 1st Brigade, 1st Division. IX Corps, AoP, to April, 1862.
- 1st Brigade, 1st Division. IX Corps, Army of the Ohio (AoO), to June. 1863.
- 3rd Brigade. 1st Division, IX Corps, Army of the Tennessee, to August. 1863.
- 1st Brigade, 1st Division. IX Corps, AoO, to April, 1864.
- 2nd Brigade, 3rd Division, IX Corps, AoP, to September.
- 1st Brigade, 1st Division, IX Corps, AoP to October, 1864.
- 1st Brigade, 2nd Division, IX Corps, Army of the Potomac, to July 1865.

=== List of battles ===
The official list of battles in which the regiment bore a part:

- Battle of Secessionville
- Battle of South Mountain
- Battle of Antietam
- Battle of Fredericksburg
- Siege of Vicksburg
- Siege of Jackson
- Knoxville Campaign
- Overland Campaign
- Battle of the Wilderness
- Battle of Spotsylvania Court House
- Battle of North Anna
- Battle of Totopotomoy Creek
- Battle of Cold Harbor
- Siege of Petersburg
- Battle of the Crater
- Battle of Globe Tavern
- Battle of Boydton Plank Road
- Battle of Fort Stedman
- Appomattox Campaign
- Third Battle of Petersburg

=== Detailed service ===
(NOTE — Battles are Bolded, Italicized; campaigns are Italicized)

==== 1861 ====
- Moved to Washington, D.C., October 21–23
- Expedition into lower Maryland November 3–11, 1861
- Moved to Baltimore, Md., then to Fort Monroe, Va., November 19–21
- Sailed for Port Royal, S.C., December 6–8
- Companies A, C, D, E, and I assigned to duty at Bay Point; Companies B, F, G, H, and K occupied Otter Island, S.C., December 11, and duty there until May 1862; Companies F and K occupied Fenwick Island December 20, 1861; Company F at Fenwick Island April 4 to May 20, 1862; Companies B, F, G, H, I, and K moved to North Edisto Island, S.C., May 21, 1862

==== 1862 ====
- Operations against James Island, SC, May 21-June 28
- Action on James Island June 10.
- Battle of Secessionville June 16
- Evacuation of James Island and movement to Hilton Head June 28-July 1
- Moved to Newport News, Va., July 18–21, then to Aquia Creek August 4–5
- Operations on the Rapidan and Rappahannock Rivers until September
- At Brook's Station August 5–29
- Destruction of bridges at Potomac Creek and Brook's Station September 4
- Destruction of stores at Aquia Creek September 6
- Battle of South Mountain September 14
- Battle of Antietam September 16–17
- Duty at Pleasant Valley, Md., until October 26
- Marched to Lovettsville, Va., October 26–29; then to Warrenton October 29-November 19
- Battle of Fredericksburg December 12–15

==== 1863 ====
- Burnside's Mud March January 20–24, 1863
- At Falmouth until February 11
- Moved to Newport News February 11, then to Lexington, Ky., March 19–23
- Duty at various points in Kentucky until June
- Moved to Vicksburg, Miss., June 7–14
- Siege of Vicksburg June 14-July 4
- Advance on Jackson, Miss., July 5–10
- Siege of Jackson July 10–17
- At Milldale until August 5
- Moved to Covington, Ky., then to Crab Orchard August 5–18
- Burnside's Campaign in eastern Tennessee August 16-October 17
- Blue Springs October 10
- Knoxville Campaign November 4-December 23
- Lenoir Station November 14–15
- Campbell's Station November 16
- Siege of Knoxville November 17-December 4
- Pursuit of Longstreet December 5–24

==== 1864 ====
- Regiment reenlisted January 1, 1864
- Operations in eastern Tennessee until March 1864
- Strawberry Plains January 21–22
- Movement to Annapolis, Md., March 21-April 6
- Overland Campaign May 4-June 12
- Battle of the Wilderness May 5–7;
- Spotsylvania May 8–12;
- Spotsylvania Court House May 12–21
- Assault on the Salient May 12
- Stannard's Mill May 21
- North Anna River May 23–26
- Line of the Pamunkey May 26–28
- Totopotomoy May 28–31
- Cold Harbor June 1–12
- Bethesda Church June 1–3
- Before Petersburg June 16–18
- Siege of Petersburg June 16, 1864 to April 2, 1865
- Battle of the Crater, Petersburg, July 30, 1864
- Second Battle of Weldon Railroad August 18–21
- Poplar Springs Church September 29-October 2
- Peeble's Farm October 1
- Boydton Plank Road, Hatcher's Run, October 27–28
- At Fort Rice until April 1865

==== 1865 ====
- Fort Stedman March 25, 1865
- Assault on and fall of Petersburg April 2
- Marched to Farmville April 3–9
- Moved to Petersburg and City Point April 20–24, then to Alexandria April 26–28
- Grand Review of the Armies May 23
- Duty at Washington and Alexandria until July

== Casualties ==
The regiment lost a total of 479 men during service; 13 officers and 214 enlisted men killed or mortally wounded, 252 enlisted men died of disease.

== Commanders ==
- Colonel Thomas Welsh - promoted to brigadier general March 1, 1863
- Colonel John I. Curtin
- Lieutenant Colonel Francis M. Hills - commanded during the Knoxville Campaign
- Captain Theodore Gregg - commanded during the Battle of the Crater

== Notable members ==
- Captain Rees G. Richards, Company G — 16th Lieutenant Governor of Ohio, 1882-1884
- Corporal Franklin Hogan, Company A — Capture of flag of 6th Virginia Infantry (C.S.A.) Second Petersburg, 30 July 1864

== See also ==
- List of Pennsylvania Civil War Units
- Pennsylvania in the Civil War
