= Charles Thatcher =

Charles Thatcher may refer to:

- Charles M. Thatcher (1843–1900), American soldier in the American Civil War
- Charles Robert Thatcher (1830–1878), New Zealand singer, entertainer and songwriter
