= Sidney Haight =

American Civil War recipient of the Medal of Honor

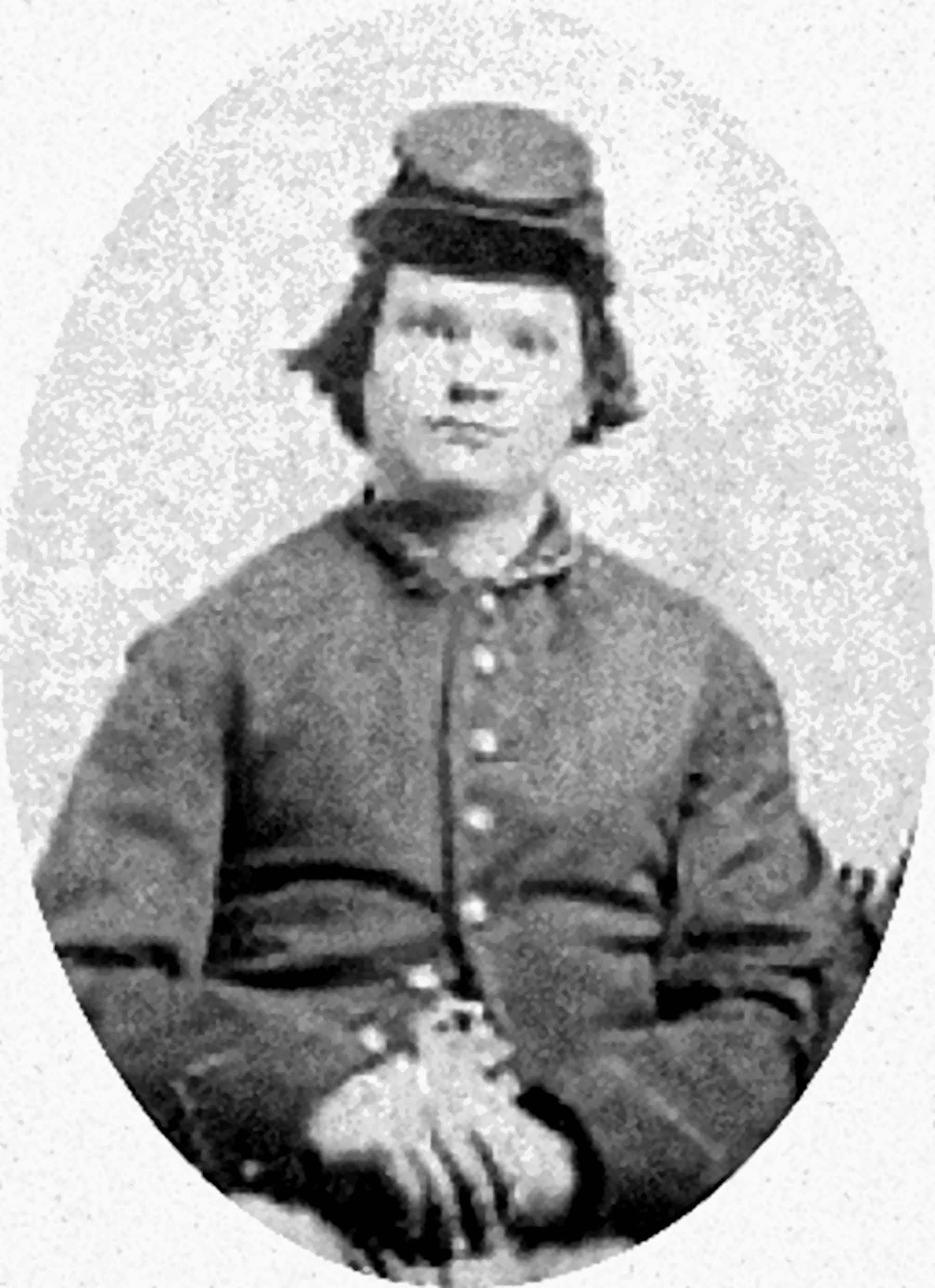
- Born: August 21, 1847; Reading, Michigan
- Died: September 17, 1918 (aged 71); Reading, Michigan
- Burial place: Reading, Michigan
- Military career
- Allegiance: United States of America
- Branch: United States Army (Union Army)
- Rank: Corporal
- Units: Company E, 1st Michigan Volunteer Sharpshooters Regiment
- Conflicts: American Civil War: Battle of the Wilderness; Battle of Spotsylvania Court House; Battle of Cold Harbor; Siege of Petersburg; Appomattox Campaign
- Awards: Medal of Honor

Sidney Haight (August 21, 1847 – September 17, 1918) was awarded the Medal of Honor during the American Civil War for actions during the Siege of Petersburg.

== Military service ==
On 23 October 1863, Haight lied about his age and said he was 17 (he had turned 16 in August) and mustered into Federal service in Company E, of the 1st Michigan Volunteer Sharpshooters Regiment for three years.

On 2 February 1864, Haight was joined by his older brother James B who enlisted. The brothers would serve together until Spotsylvania when Jim was wounded in the left arm.

Haight was awarded the Medal of Honor during the debacle that was the Battle of the Crater. When the rebels counterattacked, "instead of retreating, remained in the captured works, regardless of his personal safety and exposed to the firing, which he boldly and deliberately returned until the enemy was close upon him." Haight was a Corporal serving with Company E, 1st Michigan Sharpshooters. Haight was noticed by men for his courage and seeming invincibility, as he and a Native American comrade from Company K, Antoine Scott, maintained a constant, accurate covering fire on the rebels until all who could have escaped. At that time, they also retreated.

The 18-year-old Haight was probably the very last Sharpshooter to leave the redoubt. As he fired his final shot, a rebel officer with sword upraised came at him, demanding his surrender. Haight lunged and rammed his bayonet into the Confederate. Not stopping to retrieve his weapon, Haight turned and bolted for the Union lines as fast as his legs could carry him. On his way across the shell-torn expanse of open ground he lost his cap and felt lead balls tear through the ends of his jacket. A bullet hit the heel of his shoe, ripping the sole back to within an inch of the toe; that sole flapped with every running step. The bullets spat around Haight until he dived into the Union trench out of breath, hatless, with a sole mostly pulled from his shoe, but safe and sound.

Haight also participated in the recapture of the redoubt at the Battle of Fort Stedman where the 1st Michigan Sharpshooters, skirmishing for the 20th Michigan pinned down the rebels who had taken the for that they could not escape the counterattack and were taken prisoner. Haight's conduct was so outstanding that he was again recommended for a Medal of Honor.

Haight mustered out of Federal service with his regiment, 28 July 1865, still only seventeen-years-old. He married and had two sons: Elsworth Haight (1879–1917) and Benjamin Harrison Haight (1888–1957). He received the Medal of Honor for his heroic behavior in the Crater until the 1890s. He died on 17 September 1918, aged 71, survived by his brother James, who died in 1919, and his son Benjamin.

== Medal of Honor citation ==
The President of the United States of America, in the name of Congress, takes pleasure in presenting the Medal of Honor to Corporal Sidney Haight, United States Army, for extraordinary heroism on 30 July 1864, while serving with Company E, 1st Michigan Sharpshooters, in action at Petersburg, Virginia. Instead of retreating, Corporal Haight remained in the captured works, regardless of his personal safety and exposed to the firing, which he boldly and deliberately returned until the enemy was close upon him.
