= 1875 Pennsylvania gubernatorial election =

- November 2, 1875
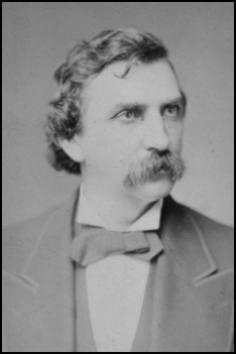

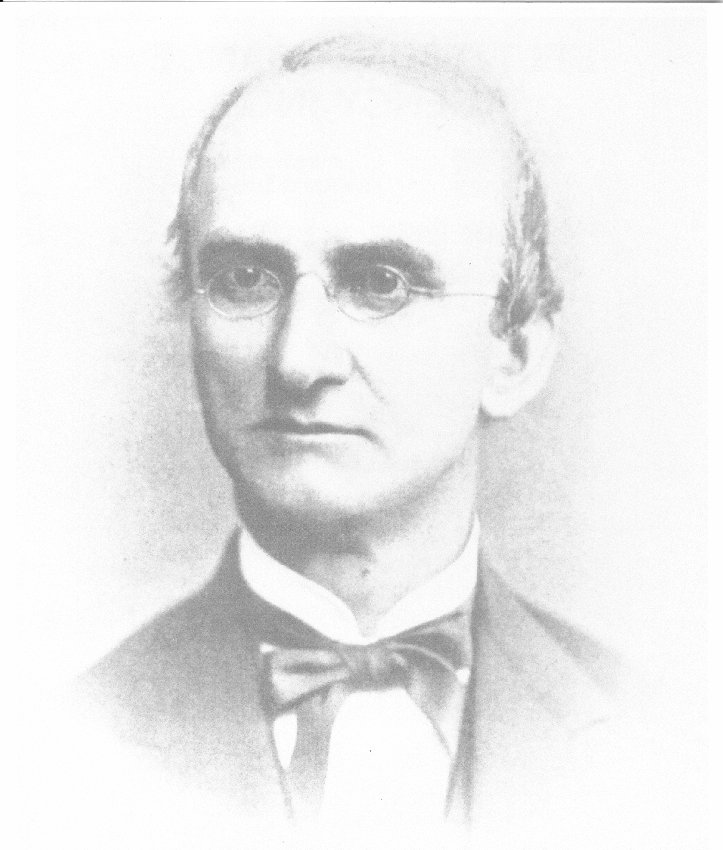
Nominee	John F. Hartranft	Cyrus L. Pershing
Party	Republican	Democratic
Popular vote	304,175	292,145
Percentage	49.90%	47.93%
- County results Hartranft: 40–50% 50–60% 60–70% Pershing: 40–50% 50–60% 60–70% 70–80%
Governor before election
John F. Hartranft
Republican
Elected Governor
John F. Hartranft
Republican

The 1875 Pennsylvania gubernatorial election occurred on November 2, 1875. Incumbent governor John F. Hartranft, a Republican, was a candidate for re-election. Hartranft defeated Democratic candidate Cyrus L. Pershing to win another term.

== Background ==
Hartranft had already become an important figure in the history of the Commonwealth of Pennsylvania and the United States prior to his election as governor during the 1872 Pennsylvania gubernatorial election. A colonel in the Union Army who was awarded the U.S. Medal of Honor for the valor he displayed on July 21, 1861, in the First Battle of Bull Run during the American Civil War, he was repeatedly promoted up through the officer ranks to become a major general, and ultimately became the United States Army officer who read the death warrant to Mary Surratt, George Atzerodt, David Herold, and Lewis Powell before they were executed on July 7, 1865, for conspiring to assassinate U.S. President Abraham Lincoln. Post-war, he was elected twice as Pennsylvania's auditor general before choosing to run for the governor's office.

Inaugurated as Pennsylvania's 17th governor on January 21, 1873, after winning his first election in 1872, Hartranft was then inaugurated a second time, on January 18, 1876, after winning the 1875 Pennsylvania gubernatorial election.

== Results ==
Pennsylvania gubernatorial election, 1875
Party	Candidate	Votes	%
Republican	John F. Hartranft (incumbent)	304,175	49.90
Democratic	Cyrus L. Pershing	292,145	47.93
Prohibition	R. Audley Brown	13,244	2.17
Total votes		609,564	100.00
