= Franklin Hogan =

- Born: January 7, 1843; York, Pennsylvania, US
- Died: April 5, 1932 (aged 89); Hutchinson, Kansas, US
- Burial place: Hutchinson Eastside Cemetery, Hutchinson, Kansas
- Military career
- Allegiance: United States
- Branch: United States Army; Union Army
- Service years: 1861–1864
- Rank: Private
- Units: Company A, 45th Pennsylvania Volunteer Infantry Regiment
- Conflicts: American Civil War
- Awards: Medal of Honor

Franklin Hogan (November 26, 1842 – March 29, 1933) was a decorated hero of the Union Army in the American Civil War.

== War service ==
Hogan mustered in as a Corporal in Company A, 45th Pennsylvania Volunteer Infantry Regiment on August 16, 1861.

According to the Military Times Hall of Valor, on 30 July 1863, while serving with Company A, 45th Pennsylvania Infantry Regiment, in action at Petersburg, Virginia, the 45th charged into the huge crater caused by Union forces exploding tons of gunpowder under Confederate lines. In A. P. Hill's counterattack, the color-bearer of the 6th Virginia Infantry attempted to plant the regiment's battleflag at the top of the crater's parapet. Corporal Hogan shot him down and seized the colors of the 6th Virginia in Mahone's Virginia Brigade in Anderson's Division in Hill's III Corps.

Rank and organization: Corporal, Company A, 45th Pennsylvania Volunteer Infantry Regiment. Place and date: At Petersburg, VA., July 30, 1864

Citation:

The President of the United States of America, in the name of Congress, takes pleasure in presenting the Medal of Honor to Corporal Franklin Hogan, United States Army, for extraordinary heroism on 30 July 1864, while serving with Company A, 45th Pennsylvania Infantry, in action at Petersburg, Virginia, for capture of flag of 6th Virginia Infantry (Confederate States of America).

Franklin Hogan received his medal on October 1, 1864. Hogan honorably mustered out when his enlistment expired twenty days later on October 20, 1864.

== Post war ==
Franklin Hogan returned to York and married Elizabeth Patterson. They had two sons who were both born in Pennsylvania: Edward A Hogan (1872–1929) and Harry D Hogan (1878–1943). At some time after the war, the family moved to Hutchinson, Kansas where Hogan had a farm and worked for the Kansas Salt Company.

== See also ==
- 45th Pennsylvania Infantry Regiment
- List of Medal of Honor recipients
- List of American Civil War Medal of Honor recipients: G–L
