= Charles H. DePuy =

American soldier in the American Civil War

- Born: September 8, 1842; Sherman, Michigan
- Died: January 6, 1935 (aged 92); Kalkaska, Michigan
- Burial place: Evergreen Cemetery
- Military career
- Allegiance: United States of America
- Branch: United States Army
- Rank: First Sergeant
- Unit: 1st Michigan Volunteer Sharpshooters Regiment - Company H
- Conflicts: Battle of the Crater
- Awards: Medal of Honor

First Sergeant Charles H. DePuy (September 8, 1842 – January 6, 1935) was an American soldier who fought in the American Civil War. DePuy received the United States' highest award for bravery during combat, the Medal of Honor, for his action during the Battle of the Crater in Petersburg, Virginia on July 30, 1864. He was honored with the award on July 30, 1896.

== Biography ==
DePuy was born in Sherman, Michigan, on September 8, 1842. He enlisted into the 1st Michigan Sharpshooters. He died on January 6, 1935, and his remains are interred at the Evergreen Cemetery in Michigan.

== Medal of Honor citation ==
Being an old artillerist, aided General Bartlett in working the guns of the dismantled fort.

== See also ==
- List of American Civil War Medal of Honor recipients: A–F
