= John Parke =

Union Army officer in the American Civil War

John Grubb Parke
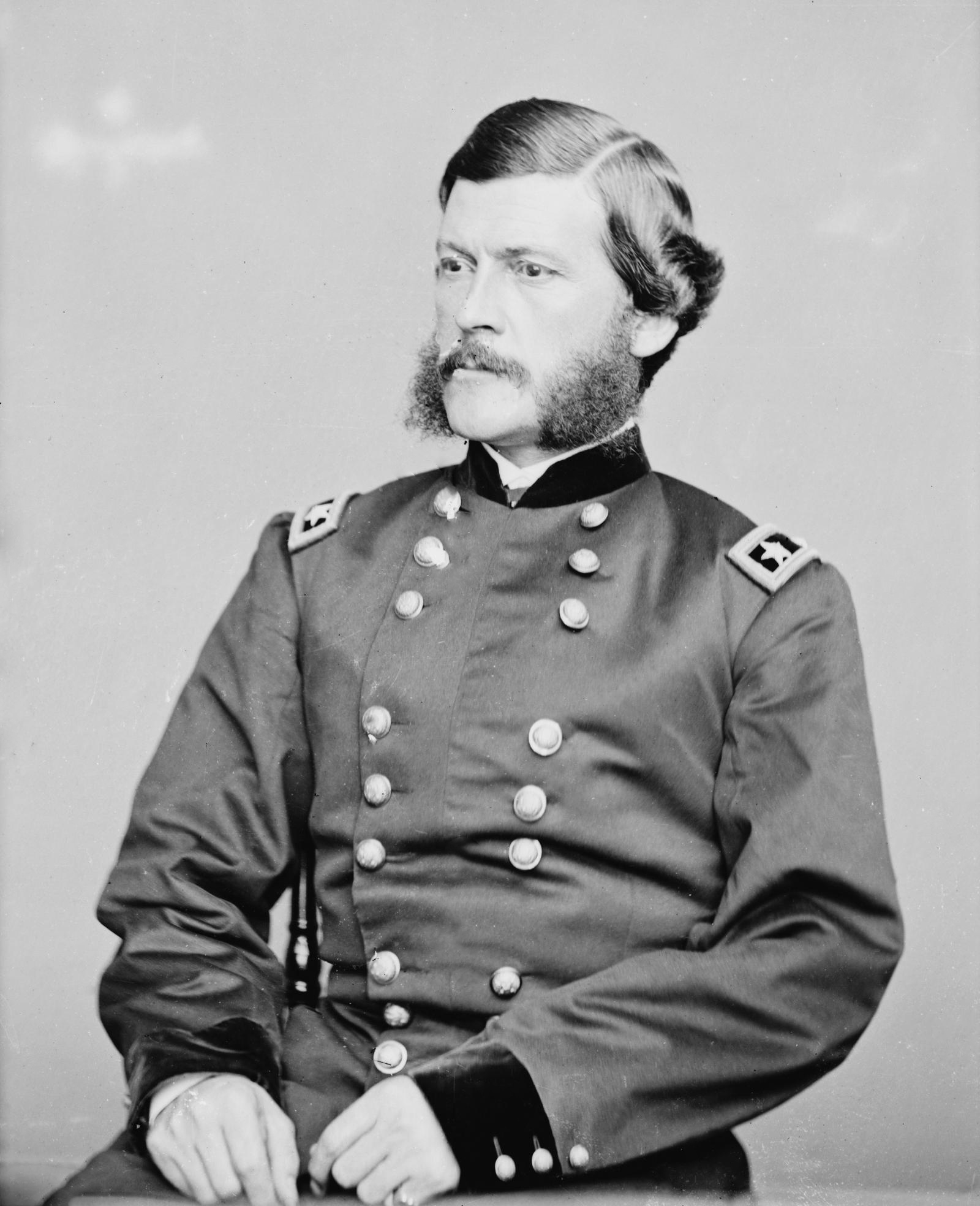
- Born: September 22, 1827; Chester County, Pennsylvania, U.S.
- Died: December 16, 1900 (aged 73); Washington, D.C., U.S.
- Burial place: Philadelphia, Pennsylvania
- Military career
- Allegiance: United States of America; Union
- Branch: United States Army; Union Army
- Service years: 1849–1889
- Rank: Major General
- Commands: IX Corps
- Conflicts: American Civil War: Battle of Fort Macon; Battle of Antietam; Battle of Fredericksburg; Vicksburg Campaign; Knoxville Campaign; Overland Campaign; Siege of Petersburg

John Grubb Parke (September 22, 1827 – December 16, 1900) was a United States Army engineer and a Union general in the American Civil War. Parke's Civil War service was closely associated with Ambrose E. Burnside, often serving him as chief of staff in major engagements such as Antietam, Fredericksburg and the Overland Campaign. Parke also held significant field commands during Burnside's North Carolina Expedition, Vicksburg and the battle of Fort Stedman as well as brief stints in command of the Army of the Potomac. From 1887 to 1889, John G. Parke was the Superintendent of the United States Military Academy.

== Early life ==
Parke was born in Coatesville, Chester County, Pennsylvania, to Francis G. and Sarah Parke. He graduated from the United States Military Academy in 1849 and was commissioned a brevet second lieutenant in the Corps of Topographical Engineers. As an engineer, he determined the boundary lines between Iowa and the Little Colorado River, surveyed routes for a railroad from the Mississippi River to the Pacific Ocean, and served as the chief surveyor of the party charged with the delineation of the boundary of the northwest United States and the Province of Canada, 1857–1861.

== Civil War ==
At the start of the Civil War, Parke was appointed brigadier general of volunteers and commanded a brigade in the operations on the North Carolina coast in early 1862. He received a brevet promotion for the Battle of Fort Macon and was promoted to major general of volunteers on July 18, 1862.

In the Army of the Potomac, Parke served briefly as commander of 3rd Division, IX Corps. Then he served as chief of staff to Maj. Gen. Ambrose Burnside during the battles of Antietam and Fredericksburg. He assumed command of the IX Corps and was sent to the Western Theater for the Vicksburg Campaign. Parke then was Burnside's chief of staff in the Army of the Ohio in the defense of Knoxville.

Parke served as chief of staff to Burnside during the Overland Campaign, in which the latter commanded IX Corps, as well as in the beginning stages of the Siege of Petersburg. After the Battle of the Crater, Burnside was relieved of command and Parke assumed command of the IX Corps. He led it at the Battle of Globe Tavern, the Battle of Peebles' Farm, and the Battle of Boydton Plank Road.

In 1865, while Army of the Potomac commander Maj. Gen. George G. Meade was in a conference, Parke, being senior officer, was acting commander of the army during the Battle of Fort Stedman until Meade returned to the field. He led the IX Corps through the fall of Petersburg and the Appomattox Campaign. In 1865 he was appointed brevet major general in the regular army in recognition of his service at Fort Stedman.

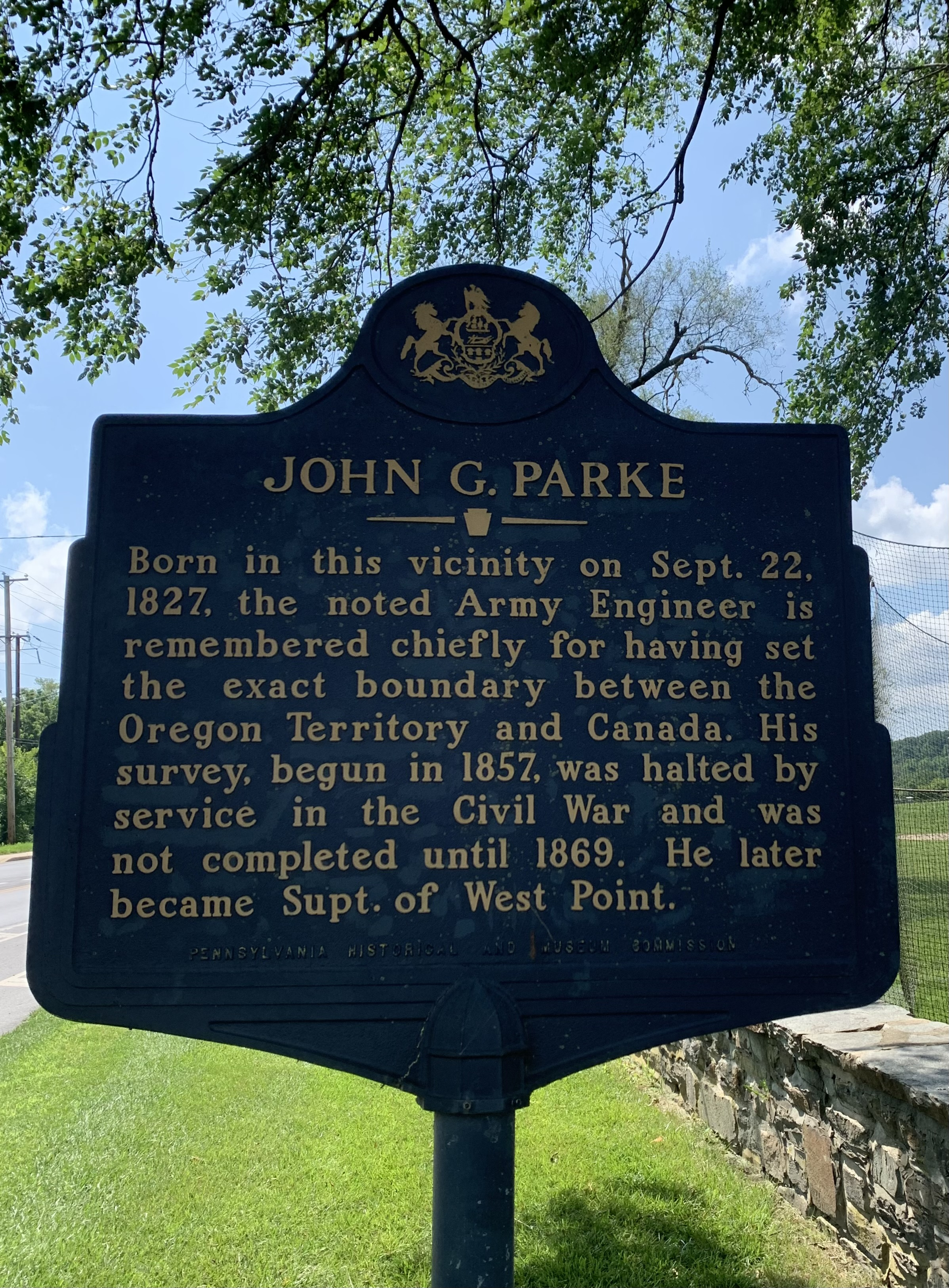
State historical marker erected outside Coatesville, Pennsylvania, in 1968

== Postbellum career ==
After the Confederate surrender, Parke commanded IX Corps in the Department of Washington. He also briefly commanded XXII Corps. Parke was mustered out of the volunteer service on January 15, 1866. He served as an engineer, being promoted to the rank of lieutenant colonel on March 4, 1879. Parke attained the rank of colonel on March 17, 1884. He served as superintendent of the United States Military Academy from August 28, 1887, to June 24, 1889, and he retired from the Army on July 2 of that year.

Parke wrote several reports on public improvements and exploration of the west. He also served as a cartographer, publishing maps of the New Mexico Territory and California.

Parke died in Washington, D.C., leaving a wife, Ellen, but no children. He is buried in the churchyard of Church of St. James the Less in Philadelphia.

A Pennsylvania state historical marker outside Coatesville commemorates Parke as a surveyor and West Point superintendent.

== Selected works ==
- Extracts from opinions of attorneys-general of U.S. concerning acquisition of land; bridges; certificate of Government titles; cession of jurisdiction; compensation of counsel; contracts; disbursing officers; execution of laws; harbor improvements; miscellaneous subjects; obstruction to navigation; public property; riparian rights; sales of public property; soil under navigable waters; South Pass, Mississippi River; Washington Aqueduct; and Washington City, Washington: G.P.O., 1882.
- Extracts from the reports of decisions of the Supreme Court of the United States concerning navigable waters, riparian proprietors, bridges, boundaries between states, eminent domain, title to certain lots in Washington City, and contracts, Washington: G.P.O., 1882.
- Laws of the United States relating to the construction of bridges over navigable waters of the United States, 2nd ed., Washington, D.C.: G.P.O., 1887–1893.
- Laws of the United States relating to the improvement of rivers and harbors: from August 11, 1790 to March 3, 1887, with a tabulated statement of appropriations and allotments, Washington: G.P.O., 1887.
- Message ... communicating ... information with regard to the present condition of the work marking the boundary, pursuant to the first article of the treaty between the United States and Great Britain of June 15, 1846, Washington, D.C.: G.P.O., 1860.
- (with William H. Emory) Report of explorations for that portion of a railway route near the 32d parallel of latitude, lying between Dona Ana, on the Rio Grande, and Pimas Villages, on the Gila, 1855, Washington, D.C.: Corps of Topographical Engineers, 1859.

== See also ==
- List of American Civil War generals (Union)

Military offices
Preceded by Wesley Merritt	Superintendents of the United States Military Academy; 1887–1889	Succeeded by John Moulder Wilson
