= Battle of Fort Stedman =

1865 battle of the American Civil War in Petersburg, Virginia

Coordinates: 37.226°N 77.371°W

- Part of the American Civil War
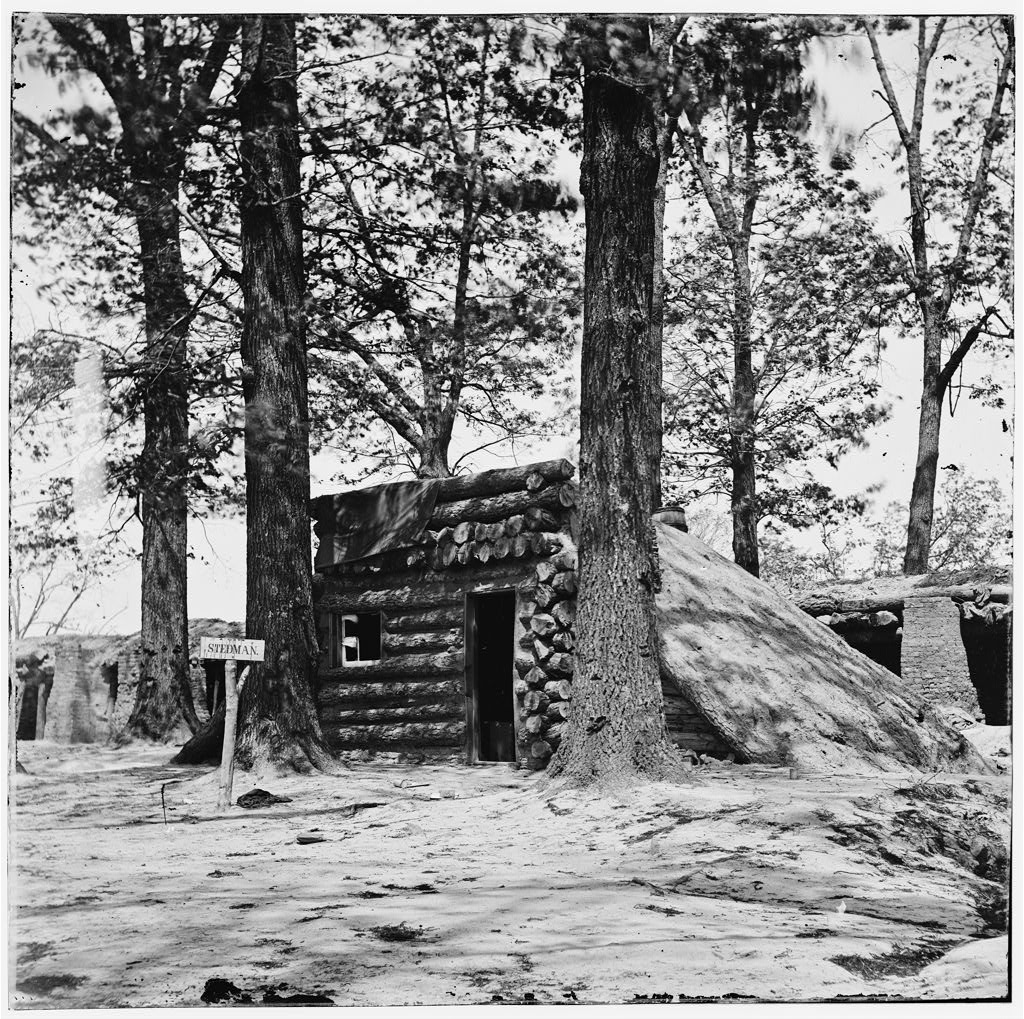
- 1865 photograph at Fort Stedman by Timothy H. O'Sullivan
Date	March 25, 1865
Location	Petersburg, Virginia
Result	Union victory

Belligerents
United States (Union)	(Confederate States of America) CSA (Confederacy)

Commanders and leaders
John G. Parke	John B. Gordon

Strength
14,898	10,000

Casualties and losses
1,044 total 72 killed 450 wounded 522 missing/captured	4,000 total 600 killed 2,400 wounded 1,000 missing/captured

The Battle of Fort Stedman, also known as the Battle of Hare's Hill, was fought on March 25, 1865, during the final weeks of the American Civil War. The Union Army fortification in the siege lines around Petersburg, Virginia, was attacked in a pre-dawn Confederate assault by troops led by Maj. Gen. John B. Gordon. The attack was the last serious attempt by Confederate troops to break the Siege of Petersburg. After an initial success, Gordon's men were driven back by Union troops of the IX Corps commanded by Maj. Gen. John G. Parke.

== Background ==
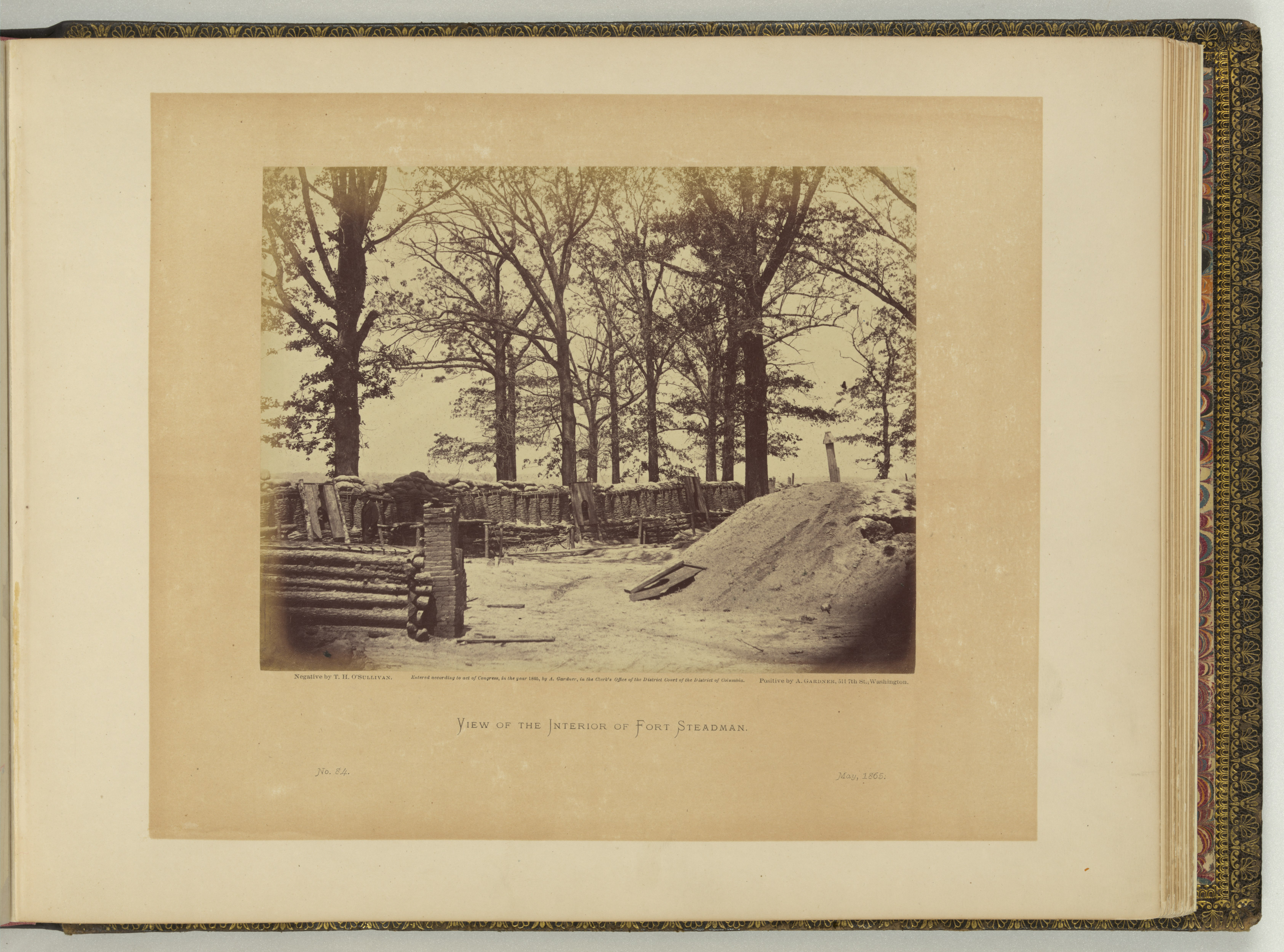
View of the interior of Fort Stedman

During March 1865, Confederate General Robert E. Lee continued to defend his positions around Petersburg, but his Army was weakened by desertion, disease, and shortage of supplies and he was outnumbered by his Union counterpart, Lt. Gen. Ulysses S. Grant, by about 125,000 to 50,000. He asked Maj. Gen. John B. Gordon for advice. Gordon replied that he had three recommendations, in decreasing order of preference: first, offer peace terms to the enemy; second, retreat from Richmond and Petersburg, link up with the Confederate army in North Carolina under General Joseph E. Johnston, jointly defeat Sherman, and then go after Grant; third, fight without delay. An argument ensued, with Lee rejecting the political implications of the first choice and indicating the difficulty of the second, but Gordon left the meeting with the impression that Lee was considering those options. On March 6, however, Gordon was summoned back to headquarters and Lee told him that "there seemed to be but one thing that we could do—fight. To stand still was death. It could only be death if we fought and failed."

Gordon later wrote in his memoirs that he "labored day and night at this exceedingly grave and discouraging problem, on the proper solution of which depended the commander's decision as to when and where he would deliver his last blow for the life of the Confederacy." He worked on his plans until March 23 and decided to recommend a surprise attack on the Union lines that would force Grant to contract his lines and disrupt his plans to assault the Confederate works (which, unbeknownst to Lee and Gordon, Grant had already ordered for March 29).

Gordon planned a pre-dawn assault from the Confederate stronghold known as Colquitt's Salient against Fort Stedman, one of the fortifications in Union lines that encircled Petersburg, named for Griffin A. Stedman, a Union colonel from Connecticut who had been killed in the vicinity in August 1864. It was one of the closest spots to the Confederate works, there were fewer wooden chevaux de frise obstructions protecting it, and a supply depot on the U.S. Military Railroad was less than a mile behind the fort. Directly after capturing Fort Stedman and its artillery, Confederate soldiers would move north and south along the Union lines to clear the neighboring fortifications and make way for the main attack, which would lead to the main Union supply base of City Point (also Grant's headquarters), ten miles (16 km) northeast where the Appomattox River joins the James River.

The assault force was three divisions of Gordon's Second Corps (under Brig. Gen. Clement A. Evans, Maj. Gen. Bryan Grimes, and Brig. Gen. James A. Walker), two brigades from the Fourth Corps division of Maj. Gen. Bushrod R. Johnson (under Brig. Gens. Matt W. Ransom and William H. Wallace) in close support, and two brigades from Maj. Gen. Cadmus M. Wilcox's Third Corps division in reserve. Lee had also ordered the division of Maj. Gen. George Pickett of the First Corps to move from its position north of the James River in time to join the action. This represented almost half of Lee's infantry of the Army of Northern Virginia: 11,500 men from Gordon's corps and Bushrod Johnson's division, 1,700 of Wilcox's men nearby, and 6,500 from Pickett moving up. Maj. Gen. W.H.F. "Rooney" Lee's cavalry division was designated to exploit the expected infantry breakthrough. Opposing them were the Union IX Corps commanded by Maj. Gen. John G. Parke, defending the first 7 miles (11 km) south from the Appomattox River, and manning in Gordon's front (from north to south) artillery Batteries IX and X, Fort Stedman, and Batteries XI and XII. Parke's 3rd Division, under Brig. Gen. John F. Hartranft, was in reserve behind the lines. While Maj. Gen. George G. Meade was away at City Point with Grant, Parke was the acting commander of the Army of the Potomac, although he would not realize that until after Gordon's attack started.

== Opposing forces ==
=== Union ===
Opposing commanders
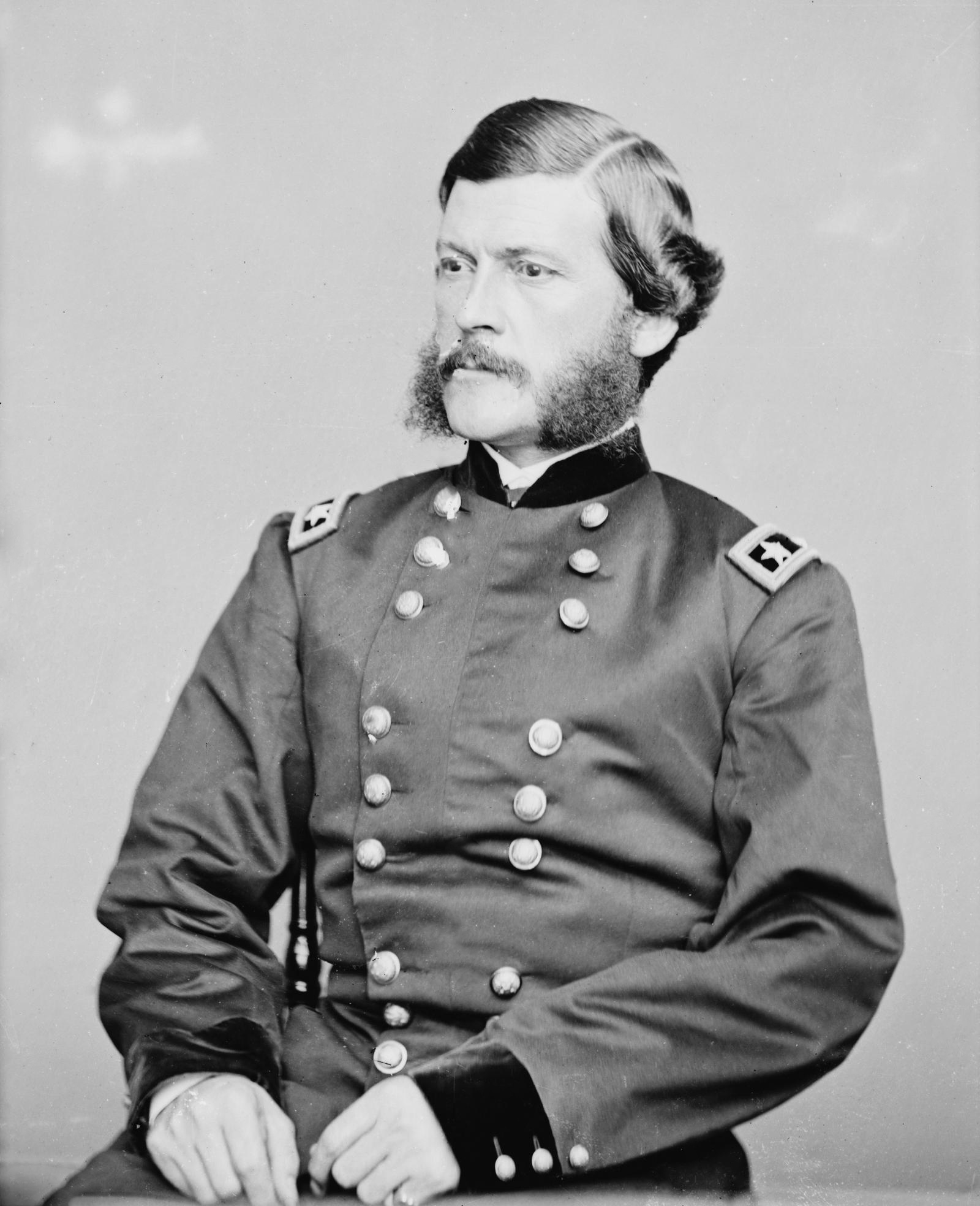
Maj. Gen. John G. Parke

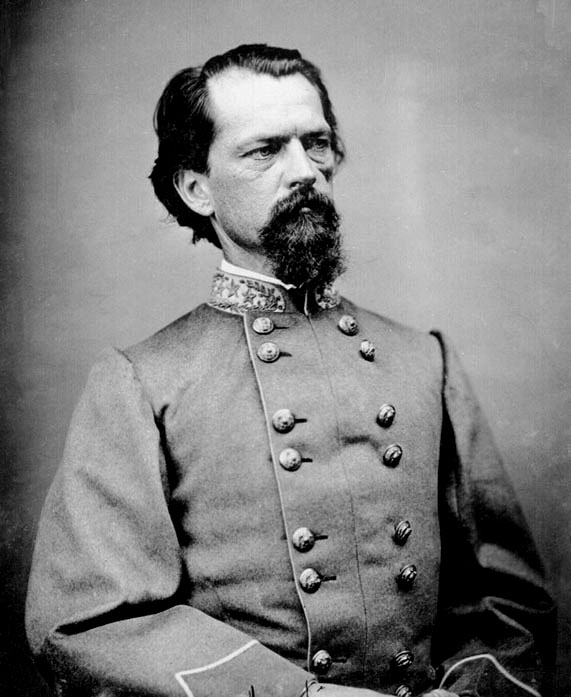
Maj. Gen. John B. Gordon

== Battle ==
=== Confederate attack ===
Gordon's attack started at 4:15 a.m. Lead parties of sharpshooters and engineers masquerading as deserting soldiers headed out to overwhelm Union pickets and to remove obstructions that would delay the infantry advance. They were followed by three groups of 100 men assigned to storm the Union works and stream back into the Union rear area. These men relied on surprise and speed—they carried unloaded muskets so that no one could accidentally fire and alert the enemy. The main thrust was between Batteries XI and X, with one group moving north for Battery XI and the other two for X and Stedman. The movement achieved complete surprise.

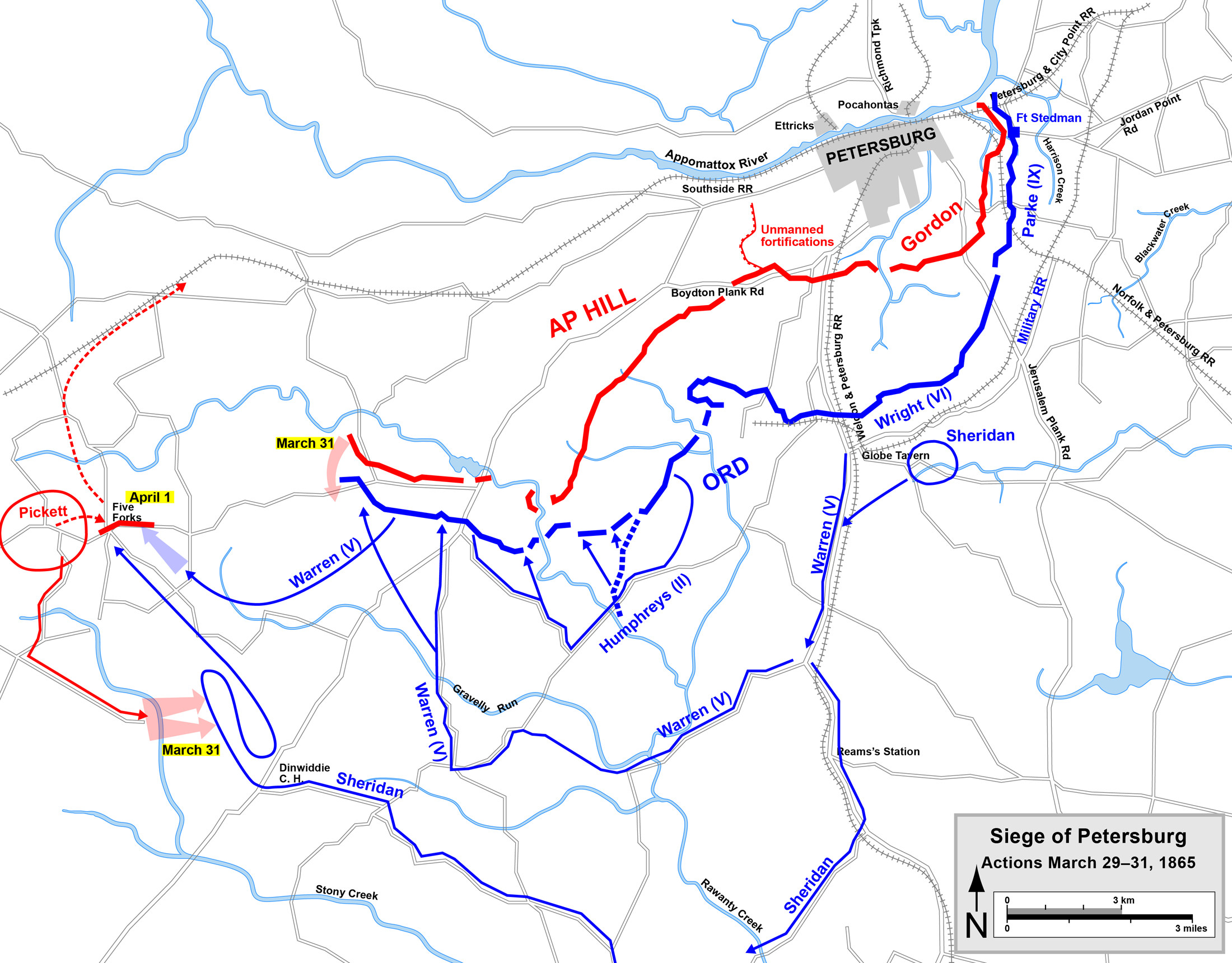
Siege of Petersburg, actions preceding Five Forks Confederate Union

Brevet Brig. Gen. Napoleon B. McLaughlen, the officer responsible for the Fort Stedman sector, heard the sounds of the attack, dressed quickly in the predawn darkness, and rode to Fort Haskell, just to the south of Battery XII, which he found to be ready to defend itself. As he moved north, McLaughlen ordered Battery XII to open fire on Battery XI and ordered a reserve infantry regiment, the 59th Massachusetts, to counterattack, which they did with fixed bayonets, briefly re-capturing Battery XI. Assuming that he had sealed the only breach in the line, McLaughlen rode into Fort Stedman. He recalled, "I crossed the parapet and meeting some men coming over the curtains, whom in the darkness I supposed to be part of the picket, I established them inside the work, giving directions with regard to position and firing, all of which were instantly obeyed." He suddenly realized that the men he was ordering were Confederates and they realized he was a Union general, capturing him. He was taken back across no man's land and surrendered his sword personally to Gordon.

Gordon soon arrived at Fort Stedman and found his attack had so far exceeded his "most sanguine expectations." Within minutes, Batteries X, XI (Retaken from the 59th Massachusetts), and XII and Fort Stedman had been seized, opening a gap nearly 1,000 feet (300 m) long in the Union line. Confederate artillerists under Lt. Col. Robert M. Stribling used the captured guns in Stedman and Battery X to open up enfilading fire on the entrenchments to the north and south. The attack began having difficulty at Battery IX to the north, where the Union troops from the brigade of Colonel Ralph Ely formed a battle line mainly from the 2nd Michigan Infantry Regiment with skirmishers from the 1st Michigan Sharpshooters Regiment supporting and the Confederates were too confused by the maze of trenches to attack it effectively. Gordon turned his attention to the southern flank of his attack and Fort Haskell, against which he launched his division under Clement Evans. The defenders successfully employed canister rounds from three cannons, halting the assault. The Confederate artillery from Colquitt's Salient began bombarding Fort Haskell and the Federal field artillery returned fire, along with the massive siege guns in the rear. When the Union flag was knocked down, the Union gunners assumed that it had fallen to the Confederates and opened fire on their own men. Volunteers were found to raise the flag again and four of them were killed before the Federal artillery ceased fire.

Gordon sent a message back to Lee that the attack was going well, but he was unaware of the trouble developing. His three 100-man detachments were wandering around the rear area in confusion and many had stopped to satisfy their hunger with captured Federal rations. The cavalry had not found an avenue through which to advance into the rear. Pickett's Division had such difficulty with rail transportation that only three of its four brigades departed on schedule, and they did not arrive until midday, too late to take part in the battle. And the main Union defense force was beginning to mobilize. Parke acted decisively, ordering Hartranft's reserve division to close the gap while his reserve artillery under Col. John C. Tidball took up positions on a ridge east of Fort Stedman and began shelling the Confederates.

=== Union counterattack ===
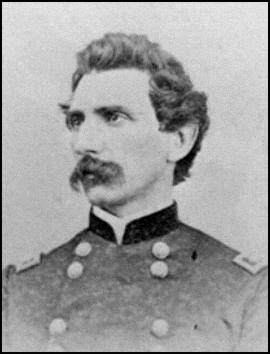
Brig. Gen. John F. Hartranft

Hartranft, in the words of historian Noah Andre Trudeau, "was a man possessed. From the instant he received word that Fort Stedman had fallen, Hartranft worked furiously to limit the Confederate penetration and, once that objective has been achieved, to eliminate the pocket." Finding that Maj. Gen. Orlando B. Willcox, Parke's 1st Division commander and a more senior officer, was preparing his headquarters to withdraw, Hartranft was able to convince Willcox to yield tactical command and he organized defensive forces that completely ringed the Confederate penetration by 7:30 a.m., stopping it just short of the military railroad depot, Meade Station. The Union artillery, aware that Confederates occupied the batteries and Fort Stedman, launched punishing fire against them.

Gordon, who was in Fort Stedman, realized his plan had failed when his lead men started returning and reported remarkable Union resistance. With permission from Lee, who had arrived to watch the battle, Gordon scrambled to get his forces back to safety. By 7:45 a.m., 4,000 Union troops under Hartranft were positioned in a semicircle of a mile and a half, ready to counterattack. A messenger arrived with word from Parke to delay the attack while reinforcements came up from the VI Corps, but Hartranft ordered his line to charge, writing afterward that "I saw that the enemy had already commenced to waver, and that success was certain. I, therefore, allowed the line to charge; besides this, it was doubtful whether I could have communicated with the regiments on the flanks in time to countermand the movement." The retreating Confederates came under Union crossfire, suffering heavy casualties. Their attack had failed. Fort Stedman was recaptured by a squad from the 208th Pennsylvania.

== Aftermath ==
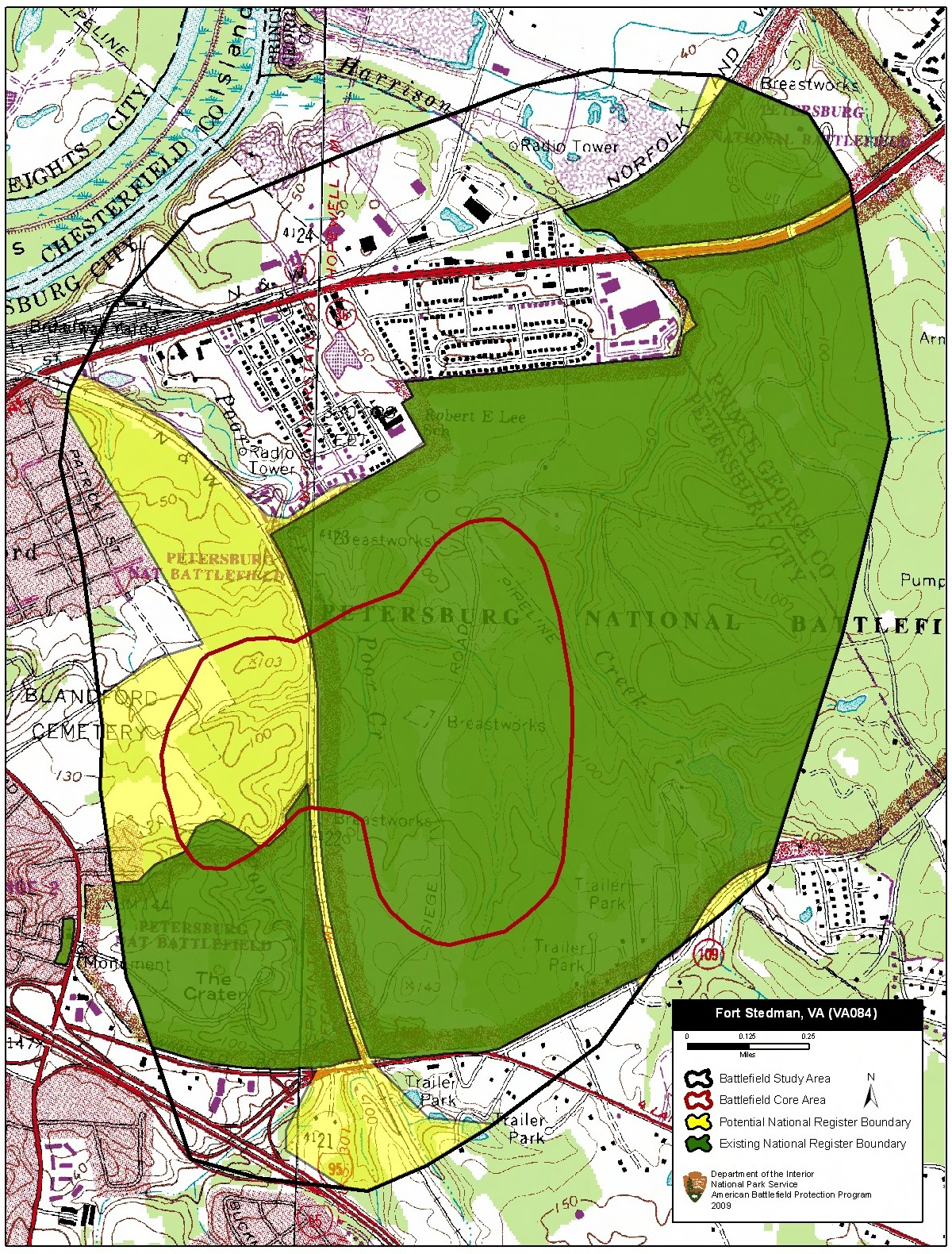
Map of Fort Stedman Battlefield core and study areas by the American Battlefield Protection Program

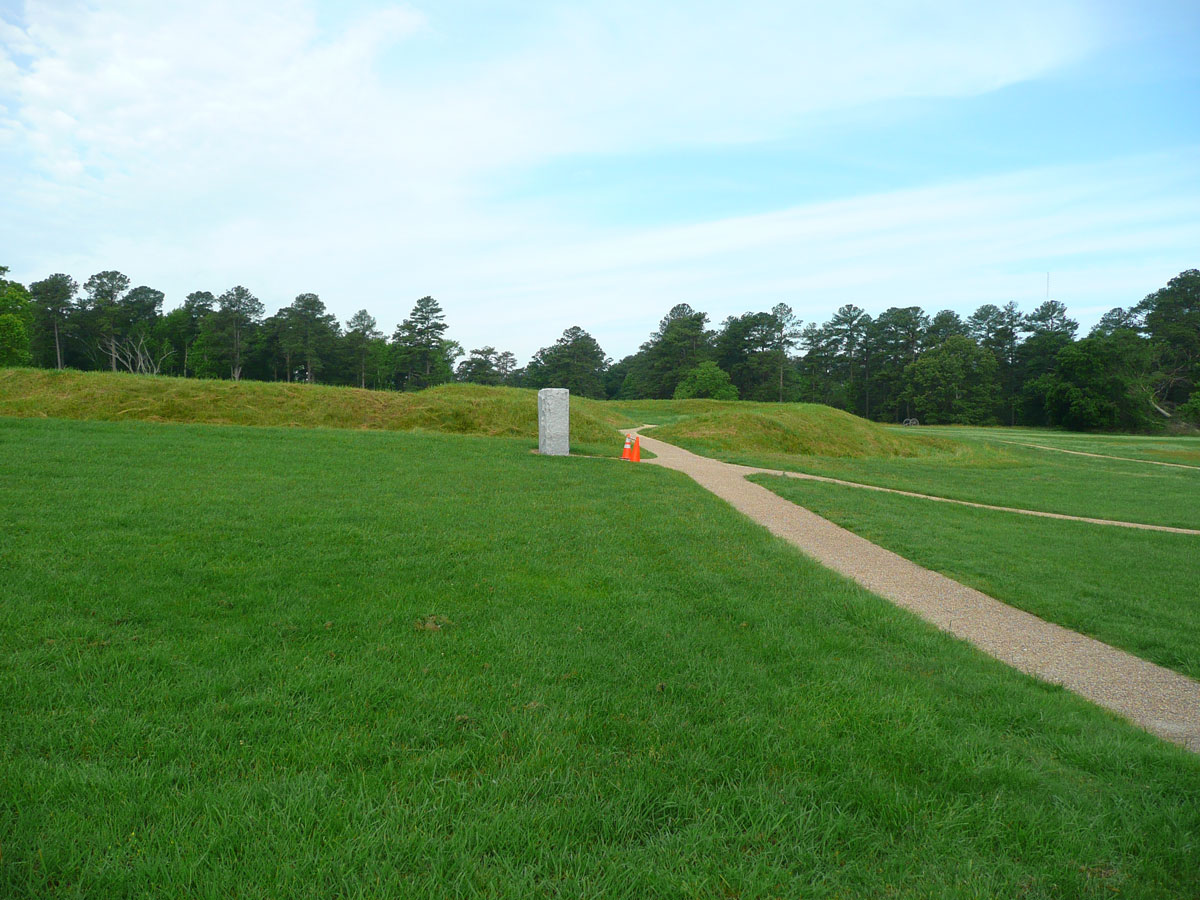
Fort Stedman, 2009

A distinguished visitor came close to witnessing the action on March 25. President Abraham Lincoln was conferring with General Grant and a division-size review parade was scheduled nearby for that morning. Because of the Confederate attack, the review was postponed until that afternoon. A Confederate prisoner was amazed to see the general and president so soon after what he considered a massive attack, riding "by us seemingly not the least concerned and as if nothing had happened." He and his fellow prisoners took note of this self-confidence and "with one accord agreed that our cause was lost." Lincoln had telegraphed to Secretary of War Edwin M. Stanton that morning, "Arrived here all safe about 9 P.M. yesterday. No war news ... Robert [Lincoln's son, serving as an aide to Grant] just now tells me there was a little rumpus up the line this morning, ending about where it began."

The attack on Fort Stedman turned out to be a four-hour action with no impact on the Union lines. The Confederate Army was forced to set back its own lines, as the Union attacked further down the front line. To give Gordon's attack enough strength to be successful, Lee had weakened his own right flank. The II Corps and VI Corps seized much of the entrenched Confederate picket line southwest of Petersburg, but found the main line still well manned. This Union advance prepared the ground for Grant's breakthrough attack in the Third Battle of Petersburg on April 2, 1865.

Union casualties in the Battle of Fort Stedman were 1,044 (72 killed, 450 wounded, 522 missing or captured), Confederate casualties a considerably heavier 4,000 (600 killed, 2,400 wounded, 1,000 missing or captured). But more seriously, the Confederate positions were weakened, and irreplaceable men lost. After the battle, Lee's defeat was only a matter of time. His final opportunity to break the Union lines and regain the momentum was gone. The Battle of Fort Stedman was the final offensive action of the Army of Northern Virginia. One week later the Union Army broke the Confederate lines ending the Richmond–Petersburg Campaign. Immediately following was the Appomattox Campaign and the final surrender of Lee's army on April 9, 1865.
