= 1872 Pennsylvania gubernatorial election =

- October 8, 1872
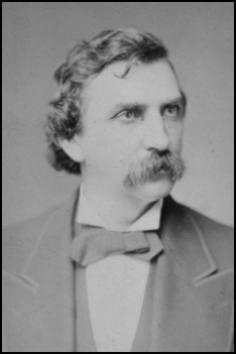

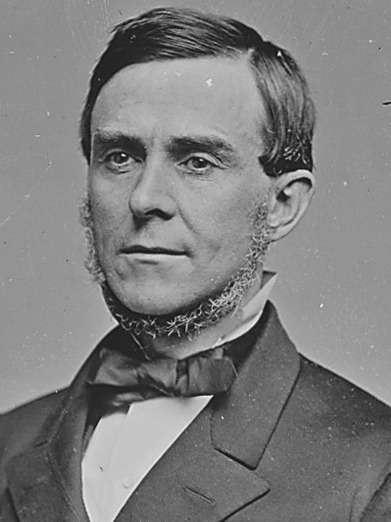
Nominee	John F. Hartranft	Charles R. Buckalew
Party	Republican	Democratic
Popular vote	353,287	317,700
Percentage	52.55%	47.26%
- County results Hartranft: 40–50% 50–60% 60–70% Buckalew: 40–50% 50–60% 60–70% 70–80% 80–90%
Governor before election
John W. Geary
Republican
Elected Governor
John F. Hartranft
Republican

The 1872 Pennsylvania gubernatorial election occurred on October 8, 1872. Incumbent governor John W. Geary, a Republican, was not a candidate for re-election.

Republican candidate John F. Hartranft defeated Democratic candidate Charles R. Buckalew to become Governor of Pennsylvania. George Washington Cass, William McClelland, and Hendrick Bradley Wright unsuccessfully sought the Democratic nomination.

== Background ==
Hartranft had become an important figure in the history of the Commonwealth of Pennsylvania and the United States during the American Civil War. A colonel in the Union Army who was awarded the U.S. Medal of Honor for the valor he displayed on July 21, 1861, during the First Battle of Bull Run, he rose through the ranks to become a major general, and was also the United States Army officer who read the death warrant to Mary Surratt, George Atzerodt, David Herold, and Lewis Powell before they were executed on July 7, 1865, for conspiring to assassinate American President Abraham Lincoln. Post-war, he was elected twice as Pennsylvania's auditor general before choosing to run for the governor's office.

After winning the 1872 gubernatorial election, Hartranft was inaugurated as Pennsylvania's 17th governor on January 21, 1873.

== Results ==
Pennsylvania gubernatorial election, 1872
Party	Candidate	Votes	%
Republican	John F. Hartranft	353,287	52.55
Democratic	Charles R. Buckalew	317,700	47.26
Prohibition	Salmon B. Chase	1,250	0.19
Independent	Winthrop W. Ketchum	1	0.00
Total votes		672,238	100.00
