= IX Corps (Union army) =

Corps of the Union Army during the American Civil War

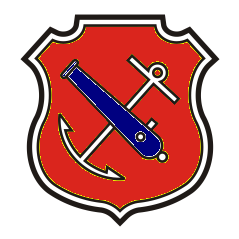
- IX Corps badge
- Active: 1862–1865
- Disbanded: July 27, 1865
- Country: United States of America
- Branch: Union Army
- Part of: Department of Virginia; Army of the Potomac; Department of the Ohio; Department of the Tennessee; Army of the Ohio
- Engagements: Second Battle of Bull Run; Battle of Chantilly; Battle of South Mountain; Battle of Antietam; Battle of Fredericksburg; Vicksburg Campaign; Knoxville Campaign; Battle of the Wilderness; Battle of Spotsylvania Courthouse; Battle of North Anna; Battle of Cold Harbor; Second Battle of Petersburg; Siege of Petersburg; Battle of the Crater; Battle of Globe Tavern; Battle of Fort Stedman

Commanders
- Notable commanders: Ambrose Burnside; Orlando B. Willcox; John G. Parke

Insignia
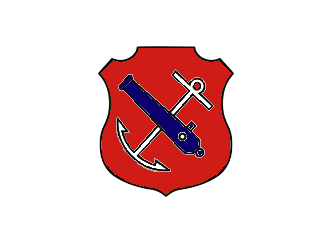
- 1st Division

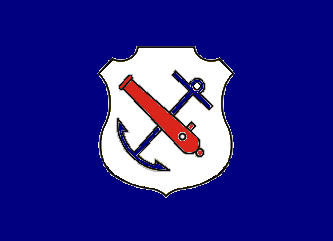
- 2nd Division

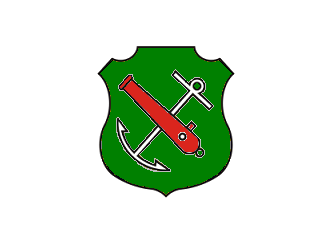
- 4th Division

IX Corps (Ninth Army Corps) was a corps of the Union Army during the American Civil War that distinguished itself in combat in multiple theaters: the Carolinas, Virginia, Kentucky, Tennessee, and Mississippi.

== Corps history ==
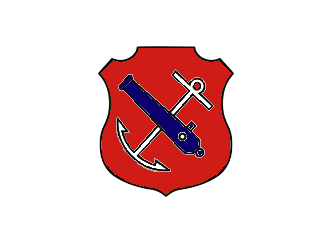
Union Army 1st Division Badge, IX Corps

=== Formation, Second Bull Run, and Antietam ===
Although the official order designating its number was not issued until July 22, 1862, the IX Corps organization dates from the expedition to North Carolina in February, 1862, under Ambrose E. Burnside and to the operations about Hilton Head, South Carolina, because the troops engaged in these movements were the only ones used in the formation of the corps. The corps was assembled by Burnside at Newport News, Virginia, from his two brigades from North Carolina and Isaac Stevens's division from Hilton Head. The corps consisted of three divisions, under Generals Isaac Stevens, Jesse L. Reno, and John G. Parke.

After a short stay at Newport News the corps was ordered to reinforce Maj. Gen. John Pope's Army of Virginia, and at Second Bull Run (August 28–30, 1862) it fought its first battle as the IX Corps. Only the two divisions of Stevens and Reno were engaged in this action; they numbered 12 regiments and 2 batteries, fewer than 5,000 men. General Reno was in command of both divisions in Burnside's absence. The losses in this small engagement amounted to 204 killed, 1,000 wounded, and 319 missing; total, 1,523. Some of the regiments encountered a severe fire, the 28th Massachusetts losing 234 men. General Stevens was killed at Chantilly (September 1, 1862).

General Reno retained command of the corps on the Maryland Campaign (September 4–20, 1862), General Burnside having charge of the right wing of the Army of the Potomac, which was composed of the I and IX Corps. Brig. Gen. Orlando B. Willcox was appointed to the command of Stevens's (1st) Division, while the 2nd and 3rd Divisions were commanded, respectively, by Generals Samuel D. Sturgis and Isaac P. Rodman. During this campaign Jacob D. Cox's Kanawha Division from western Virginia was temporarily attached to the corps. The command had also been greatly strengthened by the accession of several new regiments, just organized under the recent call for troops, and its four divisions now numbered 29 regiments and 5 batteries, with 13,819 present for duty, including non-combatants.

The Battle of South Mountain (September 14, 1862) was fought wholly by Burnside's two corps, the IX Corps losing 157 killed, 691 wounded, and 41 missing; total, 889. The total Union losses were 443 killed, 1,807 wounded and 75 missing for a total of 2,325. General Reno was killed in this action, upon which General Cox succeeded to his command.

The IX Corps next engagement would be at Antietam Creek (September 17, 1862) in western Maryland. Right before the engagement, General McClellan would abandon the wing system and remove Hooker's I Corps from the right wing, leaving Burnside with only the IX Corps under his command. There was much confusion about the verbal orders given to Cox and Burnside leading to some confusion at the river crossing. At Antietam the corps lost 438 killed, 1,796 wounded, and 115 missing; total, 2,349, out of about 8,500 in action. General Rodman was among the mortally wounded. In October, Cox's Division returned to western Virginia and its brief connection with the corps terminated.

Upon the departure of General Cox the command of the corps fell to General Willcox. General William W. Burns was appointed to fill the vacancy thus caused in the 1st Division, and Brig. Gen. George W. Getty was placed in command of the 3rd Division, formerly Rodman's. On November 5, 1862, General Burnside was made commander-in-chief of the Army of the Potomac.

At Fredericksburg (December 11–15, 1862) the IX Corps was held in reserve for most of the battle and had light casualties with a loss of 111 killed, 1,067 wounded, and 152 missing; total, 1,330. Not long after this battle Maj. Gen. John Sedgwick was assigned to the command of the corps, and General Willcox returned to the command of his division, relieving General Burns.

=== Western Theater ===
On February 5, 1863, Sedgwick was assigned command of VI Corps, and was succeeded by Maj. Gen. William F. "Baldy" Smith, and on February 12 the corps was ordered to Newport News, where it encamped for a month. General Smith's stay with the corps was of short duration due to the Senate refusing to approve his promotion, for he was succeeded in the following month by Maj. Gen. John G. Parke. While at Newport News, Getty's (3rd) Division was detached and ordered to Suffolk, Virginia, where it was subsequently incorporated into the VII Corps. It never rejoined its old command although, in 1864, one of its regiments, the 4th Rhode Island, was restored to the IX Corps.

In the meantime, General Burnside had been assigned to the command of the Department of Ohio, a district that included Kentucky and eastern Tennessee. He obtained permission for the transfer of his old corps to this field of operations, and on March 19, 1863, General Parke was ordered to proceed there with his two remaining divisions, Willcox's and Sturgis's. Just prior to the departure from Virginia, General Sturgis was relieved by Burnside for criticism of his command, and Brig. Gen. Robert B. Potter was assigned to the command of the 2nd Division. The IX Corps was stationed in Kentucky for two months, during which it served as an army of occupation. In June it was ordered to the support of Ulysses S. Grant, who was then besieging Vicksburg (May 18 – July 4, 1863), and proceeding there promptly via railroad, it participated in the investment of the city, although not under fire. Upon the surrender of Vicksburg, Parke's two divisions joined the main army in its movement on Jackson, Mississippi, and became engaged in the fighting there, with a loss of 34 killed, 229 wounded, and 28 missing; total, 291. The 1st Division was then under command of Brig. Gen. Thomas Welsh, General Willcox having been assigned to duty in Indiana. The Vicksburg Campaign had been a costly one for the Corps, not due to battle casualties, but to disease and exposure. Among those who succumbed to the deadly malaria of the Vicksburg camps was General Welsh, who, soon after, went home to die.

The corps left Mississippi in August, 1863, and returned to Kentucky, where, after a short rest, it joined in Burnside's advance into East Tennessee, a movement that had already commenced. The two divisions were now reduced to about 6,000 men. General Parke having been made chief of staff of the Army of the Ohio, General Potter succeeded to the command of the corps, with Brig. Gen. Edward Ferrero and Col. John F. Hartranft in command of the two divisions.

Ferrero's Division had a sharp little fight at Blue Springs, Tennessee, October 10, 1863, and the whole corps was engaged, November 16, at Campbell's Station. This was followed by the occupation of Knoxville and the gallant defense against James Longstreet's besieging forces, terminating December 4, in the defeat and withdrawal of the enemy.

=== Overland Campaign ===
General Willcox resumed command of the corps on January 17, 1864, relieving General Potter; on January 26, Parke relieved Willcox, who then took command of the 2nd Division.

General Burnside was again assigned to duty as commander of his old corps, which was ordered to Annapolis, Maryland, for reorganization. In April, the corps was composed of the four divisions of Thomas G. Stevenson, Potter, Willcox, and Edward Ferrero, the latter division being composed wholly of African-American troops. The corps numbered 19,331 present for duty, with 42 pieces of field artillery; but this number was soon increased, the morning reports of May 10 showing a strength of 32,708. In addition to the four divisions, with their two batteries each, there was a brigade of reserve artillery of six batteries and a provisional brigade of heavy artillerymen and dismounted cavalry. In all, there were 42 regiments of infantry, and 14 batteries of light artillery. Ferrero's Colored Division had never been under fire, while many of the white regiments in the corps were newly organized, or had served previously on garrison duty only. In the ranks of the old regiments were many recruits and conscripts.

In the Overland Campaign (May to June 1864), Ulysses S. Grant launched a major offensive against Robert E. Lee starting in May, 1864. His command in Northern Virginia consisted of the Army of the Potomac, under Maj. Gen. George G. Meade, and the IX Corps operating independently, reporting directly to Grant. Burnside technically outranked Meade and objected to receiving commands from a junior officer. By the time of the Battle of North Anna, however, Grant acknowledged that this arrangement was ineffective and he convinced Burnside, along with General Parke, his chief of staff, to waive the question of their superiority of rank over Meade. On May 25, the IX Corps was assigned to the Army of the Potomac.

In the Battle of the Wilderness (May 5–7, 1864) the corps lost 240 killed, 1,232 wounded, 168 missing; total, 1,640; and, at Spotsylvania, 486 killed, 2,119 wounded, 469 missing; total, 3,146; the heaviest loss at Spotsylvania Court House (May 8-21, 1864) occurring in the action of May 12. The corps assaulted the right, eastern, flank of the "Mule Shoe" salient. General Stevenson was killed at Spotsylvania on May 10, and Maj. Gen. Thomas L. Crittenden, formerly commander of the XXI Corps, was assigned to the command of Stevenson's (1st) Division.

=== Siege of Petersburg and the Crater ===
On June 9, at Cold Harbor (May 31 to June 12, 1864), General Crittenden was relieved at his own request, and Brig. Gen. James H. Ledlie was placed in command of the 1st Division. In the first assault on Petersburg, June 17, the corps made a brilliant attack, Potter's Division gaining possession of the works; unfortunately, the division was obliged to relinquish its foothold for want of proper support. The corps was engaged in a similar attempt on the following day, the losses in Potter's and Willcox's Divisions being unusually severe in proportion to the number engaged. Losses were 497 killed, 3,232 wounded, and 262 missing; total, 2,991. The dead included former Brig. Gen. James St. Clair Morton, chief engineer of the corps.

The enemy's works proving too strong for assault, the army entrenched itself in preparation for the ten-month siege that followed. On June 19, Ferrero's (4th) Division of black troops rejoined the corps, having been absent during the whole of the previous campaign, engaged on duty at the rear. Ferrero's men were now placed in the trenches with the other three divisions. The part of the line occupied by the IX Corps was very near the enemy's works, and an incessant firing was kept up during the siege, resulting in a daily loss of men, killed or wounded. While there was a comparative quiet in front of the other corps positions, the men of the IX Corps were subjected to the terrible strain of a constant watchfulness and deadly exposure. The enemy seemed to be excited to an undue activity by the presence of Ferrero's Colored Division.

The IX Corps was prominently connected with the siege because of its role in the infamous Battle of the Crater, in which a lengthy mine shaft was dug from its line to under the Confederate works. This mine, which was excavated by the coal miners of 48th Pennsylvania, Potter's Division, was successfully exploded with four tons of gunpowder, resulting in an enormous crater, but the assault that followed was a failure. Just before the assault, Grant and Meade directed Burnside to replace Ferrero's black division with Ledlie's white division, fearful of the political consequences of using black troops at the forefront of a major assault. But Ledlie's troops were not trained for the assault and Ledlie himself remained in the rear area, inebriated. The assault was a fiasco, in which Union soldiers charged into the crater, becoming trapped there, easy targets for the Confederates along the crater's rim. Ferrero's black regiments went into action in the rear and fought well, but had no chance for success. The losses in the IX Corps at the crater were 473 killed, 1,646 wounded, 1,356 missing; total, 3,475. Immediately after this engagement, General Ledlie was relieved from command of the 1st Division, and Brig. Gen. Julius White, of the XXIII Corps, was assigned to Ledlie's place.

On August 13, 1864, General Burnside was granted a leave of absence; he never rejoined the corps, but was succeeded by General Parke, who remained in command until the close of the war. At the battle of the Weldon Railroad, August 19–21, 1864, the three divisions of White, Potter, and Willcox were engaged with considerable loss, although the three combined numbered less than 6,000 muskets; casualties were 60 killed and 315 wounded. By this time the divisions had become so reduced in numbers that a reorganization of the corps became necessary, and so the regiments in White's Division were transferred to the divisions of Potter and Willcox. Under this arrangement Willcox's Division was numbered as the 1st; Potter's, as the 2nd; Ferrero's black troops were designated as the 3rd Division. But in December, Ferrero's Division was permanently detached, and most of his regiments were transferred to the newly organized XXV Corps, which was composed entirely of black troops. General Ferrero himself was assigned to a provisional command at Bermuda Hundred.

=== 1865 ===
The vacancy caused by detaching Ferrero's Division was filled by six new regiments of Pennsylvanians on one-year enlistments, organized into a division of two brigades, the command of which was given to Major General John F. Hartranft. This division rendered gallant service at Fort Stedman.

The morning report for March 31, 1865, showed a corps strength of 18,153, "present for duty, equipped," and 36 pieces of light artillery. With this force the IX Corps entered upon the final campaign, taking a prominent part in the storming of Petersburg, April 2, 1865, which resulted in the evacuation of Richmond and the downfall of the Confederacy. The corps' flags were the first to wave over the public buildings of Petersburg, with the 1st Michigan Sharpshooters Regiment, the 20th Michigan Infantry Regiment, the 2nd Michigan Infantry Regiment, and the 60th Ohio Infantry Regiment, all in that order, all of Willcox’s Division, being the first troops to march into Petersburg. This was the last battle in which the corps participated, and on July 27, 1865, the IX Corps was transferred to the Military District of Washington and on August 1, 1865 was disbanded.

== Command history ==
Ambrose E. Burnside	Army of the Potomac	July 22, 1862 – August 3, 1862
Ambrose E. Burnside	Department of Virginia	August 3, 1862 – September 3, 1862
Jesse L. Reno	Army of the Potomac	September 3, 1862 – September 14, 1862
Jacob D. Cox	Army of the Potomac	September 14, 1862 – October 8, 1862
Orlando B. Willcox	Army of the Potomac	October 8, 1862 – January 16, 1863
John Sedgwick	Army of the Potomac	January 16, 1863 – February 5, 1863
William F. Smith	Department of Virginia	February 5, 1863 – March 8, 1863
Orlando B. Willcox	Department of Virginia	March 8, 1863 – March 17, 1863
Ambrose E. Burnside	Department of the Ohio	March 17, 1863 – March 19, 1863
John G. Parke	Department of the Ohio	March 19, 1863 – April 4, 1863
Orlando B. Willcox	Department of the Ohio	April 4, 1863 – June 5, 1863
John G. Parke	Department of the Tennessee	June 5, 1863 – August 25, 1863
Robert B. Potter	Army of the Ohio	August 25, 1863 – September 15, 1863
John G. Parke	Army of the Ohio	September 15, 1863 – September 17, 1863
Ambrose E. Burnside	Army of the Ohio	September 17, 1863 – December 9, 1863
John G. Foster	Army of the Ohio	December 9, 1863 – January 17, 1864
Orlando B. Willcox	Army of the Ohio	January 17, 1864 – January 26, 1864
John G. Parke	Army of the Ohio	January 26, 1864 – March 16, 1864
Orlando B. Willcox	Army of the Ohio	March 16, 1864 – April 13, 1864
Ambrose E. Burnside	independent command, reporting directly to Gen. Grant	April 13, 1864 – May 24, 1864
Ambrose E. Burnside	Army of the Potomac	May 24, 1864 – August 22, 1864
John G. Parke	Army of the Potomac	August 22, 1864 – September 1, 1864
Orlando B. Willcox	Army of the Potomac	September 1, 1864 – September 10, 1864
John G. Parke	Army of the Potomac	September 10, 1864 – December 31, 1864
Orlando B. Willcox	Army of the Potomac	December 31, 1864 – January 12, 1865
John G. Parke	Army of the Potomac	January 12, 1865 – January 24, 1865
Orlando B. Willcox	Army of the Potomac	January 24, 1865 – February 2, 1865
John G. Parke	Army of the Potomac	February 2, 1865 – April 24, 1865
John G. Parke	Department of Washington	April 24, 1865 – June 7, 1865
Orlando B. Willcox	Department of Washington	June 7, 1865 – June 26, 1865
John G. Parke	Department of Washington	June 26, 1865 – July 27, 1865
