= Noah Andre Trudeau =

American historian (born 1949)

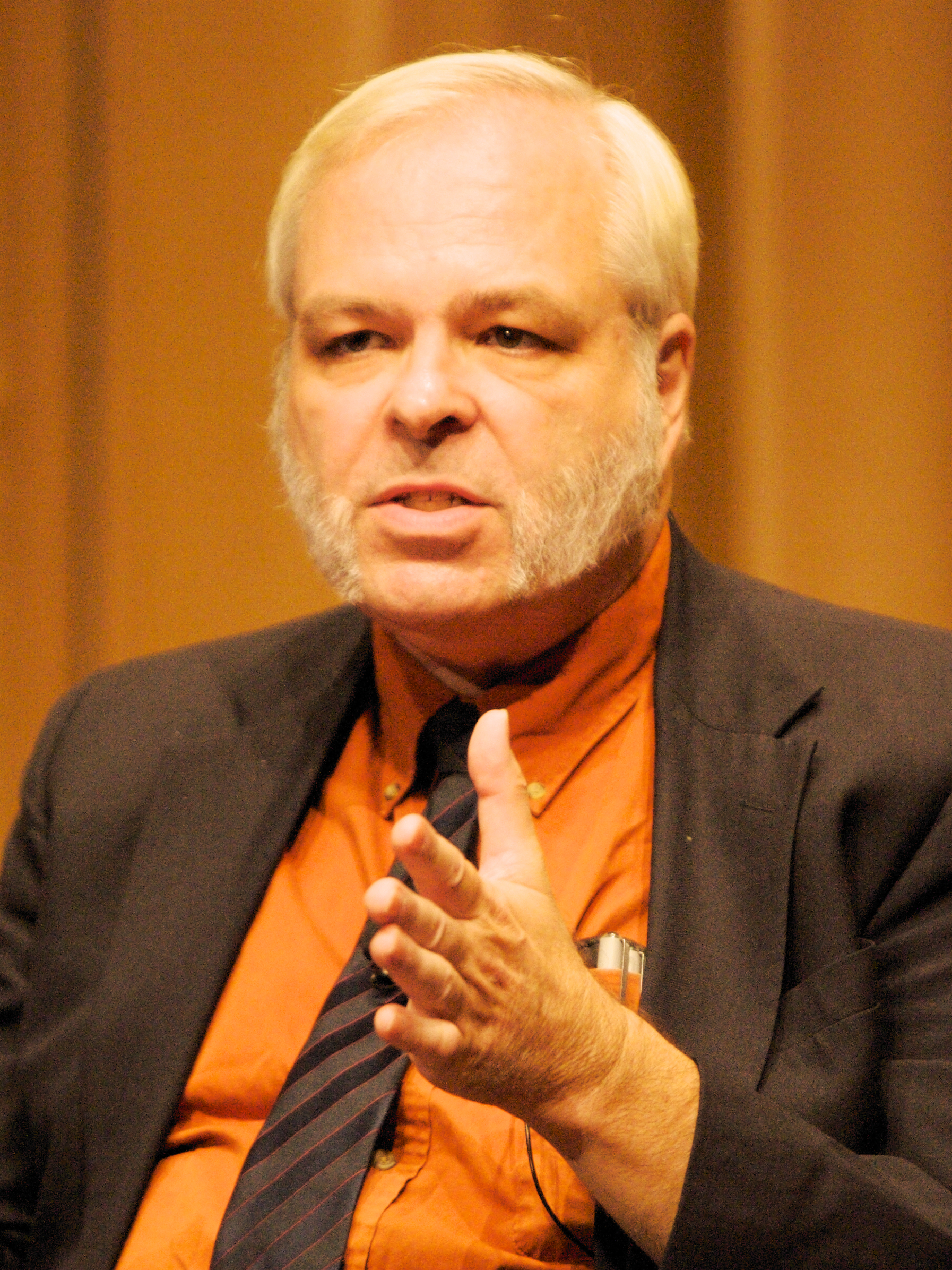
- Trudeau in 2010
- Education: State University of New York at Albany
- Occupations: Historian and author
- Writing career
- Subject: Civil War history
- Notable awards: Fletcher Pratt Award; Jerry Coffey Memorial Book Prize

Noah Andre Trudeau (born February 23, 1949) is an American historian who has written books and produced programs for National Public Radio.

== Life ==
Trudeau was born on February 23, 1949, the son of two World War II veterans. He received his B.A. in history from the State University of New York at Albany in 1971. Trudeau was formerly an executive producer at National Public Radio.

In addition to his books, Trudeau has written a number of articles for military history magazines such as Civil War Times Illustrated, Gettysburg Magazine, Blue and Gray, North & South, The Columbiad, America's Civil War and Military History Quarterly.

=== Awards ===
Trudeau's first book Bloody Roads South won the Civil War Round Table of New York's Fletcher Pratt Award. He was also awarded the Jerry Coffey Memorial Book Prize offered by the Grady McWhiney Research Foundation. In June 2012, Trudeau's essay in Military History Quarterly won the Army Historical Foundation's 2011 Distinguished Writing Award.

== Publications ==
- Bloody Roads South: the Wilderness to Cold Harbor, May–June 1864. Boston: Little, Brown, 1989. ISBN 9780316853262. OCLC 19673322
- The Last Citadel: Petersburg, Virginia, June 1864-April 1865. Boston: Little, Brown, 1991. ISBN 9780316853279. OCLC 23900651
- Out of the Storm: the End of the Civil War, April–June 1865. Boston: Little, Brown, 1994. ISBN 9780316853286. OCLC 28889025
- Voices of the 55th: Letters from the 55th Massachusetts Volunteers, 1861-1865. Dayton, Ohio: Morningside, 1996. ISBN 9780890293270. OCLC 34456734
- Like Men of War: Black Troops in the Civil War, 1862-1865. Boston: Little, Brown, 1998. ISBN 9780316853255. OCLC 36824762
- Gettysburg: A Testing of Courage. New York: HarperCollins, 2002. ISBN 9780060193638. OCLC 49999595
- Robert E. Lee: Lessons in Leadership. New York: Palgrave Macmillan, 2009. ISBN 9780230613669. OCLC 244417321
- Southern Storm: Sherman's March to the Sea. New York: Harper, 2008. ISBN 9780060598679. OCLC 174040233
- Lincoln’s Greatest Journey: Sixteen Days that Changed a Presidency, March 24—April 8, 1865. Savas Beatie, 2016. ISBN 978-1611213263
