= Thomas Welsh (general) =

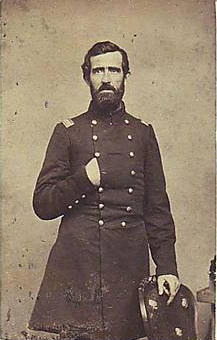
- Colonel Thomas Welsh, ca. 1862
- Born: May 5, 1824; Columbia, Pennsylvania
- Died: August 14, 1863 (aged 39); Cincinnati, Ohio
- Burial place: Mount Bethel Cemetery, Columbia, Pennsylvania
- Military career
- Allegiance: United States of America; Union
- Branch: United States Army; Union Army
- Service years: 1846–1848; 1861–1863
- Rank: Brigadier General
- Commands: 45th Pennsylvania Infantry
- Conflicts: Mexican–American War; American Civil War

Thomas Welsh (May 5, 1824 – August 14, 1863) was a soldier in the United States Army during the Mexican–American War and a Union brigadier general during the American Civil War.

== Early life and career ==
Thomas Welsh was born in Columbia, Pennsylvania on May 5, 1824, the third of four children born to Charles Welsh and Nancy (Dougherty) Welsh. His father died before his third birthday, and at the age of 8, he left home to work in a nail factory. Thus began a long series of jobs, including farming, factory work and the lumber business, in the towns of Colemanville, Gap, and Bird-in-Hand, through which he became self-sufficient at an early age. He attended school only sporadically, attaining the equivalent of four to five years of formal schooling, but was self-taught and became an educated man. At age 20, Welsh headed west to find work as an itinerant carpenter in Cincinnati, Ohio, and Fort Smith, Arkansas.

== Mexican War ==
At the outbreak of the Mexican War, Welsh enlisted as a third sergeant in the 2nd Kentucky Infantry Regiment. He served in the Battle of Monterrey under General Zachary Taylor. He was quickly promoted to first Sergeant, then, for reasons that have been lost, demoted to private.

Welsh was severely wounded at the Battle of Buena Vista on February 23, 1847, when he was hit by a musket ball which shattered the bone just below his right knee. Though the wound would leave him lame for the rest of his life, his regimental surgeon, Dr. Blanton, was able to save his leg from amputation (Welsh would later name his first son after Dr. Blanton).

He returned to Columbia to recover and was received as a war hero. In January 1848, as soon as his wound had closed, he returned to service, accepting a commission as a second lieutenant in the 11th U.S. Infantry Regiment serving under General Winfield Scott in the Vera Cruz campaign. His leg wound had not fully healed, however, and in May 1848, he was sent home on medical leave.

== Political career and return to civilian life ==
Returning to Columbia during the election year of 1848, Welsh became active in the local Democratic Party. He supported Democratic presidential nominee Lewis Cass in his race against Welsh's former commanding officer Zachary Taylor. He also spoke out against Federal anti-slavery legislation, instead favoring a doctrine of popular sovereignty, which espoused each territory's right to determine its own slavery or anti-slavery laws.

Welsh married Annie Young in October 1850. The first of their seven children was born in 1851.

He became an enterprising businessman, opening a dry goods store in Columbia's Canal Basin, selling insurance, and operating a small fleet of canal boats which he named after his children.

He was appointed weigh master in 1850 and lock superintendent a few years later. He was elected Justice of the Peace and also served as president of the Borough Council.

== Civil War ==
When the Civil War erupted in April 1861, Welsh raised one of the first companies of volunteers from Lancaster County and was elected as its captain. Within days, the company was mustered into service as part of the 2nd Pennsylvania Infantry, and he was appointed lieutenant colonel of the regiment. This was a three-month regiment, which served briefly in the Shenandoah Valley, then York, Pennsylvania, where it served out its term. In July, when his term of enlistment was over, Welsh was appointed by Governor Andrew Curtin as a colonel and placed in charge of Camp Curtin, the processing center set up to process as many as 500,000 volunteers into war service. Welsh is credited with instituting needed reforms in camp discipline and sanitation.

In October 1861, he was appointed to command the 45th Pennsylvania Infantry, a three-year regiment, which he had recruited from Centre, Tioga, Lancaster, and Mifflin Counties. The 45th eventually became known as one of the best-drilled and best-disciplined regiments in the service, for which Welsh is credited.

After brief service around Washington, the 45th was sent south to Charleston Harbor, under Gen. H. G. Wright, as part of the blockade of southern shipping. There it participated in the Battle of James Island on June 10, 1862. In July, the 45th was called north to become part of the IX Corps under Gen. Ambrose Burnside, and Welsh directed the successful rear-guard action during the Union evacuation of Acquia Creek, near Fredericksburg.

He was assigned command of the 2nd Brigade in Brig. Gen. Orlando B. Willcox's Division that August.

When Confederate General Robert E. Lee launched his invasion of Maryland in September 1862, McClellan's Army of the Potomac (of which IX Corps was part) was sent in chase. At the Battle of South Mountain on September 14, Welsh's brigade engaged the rebels at Fox's Gap. It came under heavy fire and suffered severe casualties, but succeeded in driving the Confederates off the ridge and securing a Union victory.

On September 17, 1862, at the Battle of Antietam, after first being held in reserve (on account of its losses at South Mountain), Welsh's brigade was placed into action in the afternoon after Burnside exhausted his other troops, capturing the bridge that now bears his name. Against steady opposition, Welsh's troops advanced a mile, entering the village of Sharpsburg (threatening to cut off the Confederate route of escape across the Potomac) before being called back because they could not be supported. This was the furthest Union advance of the battle. As it was, the battle ended largely in a stalemate.

Welsh's performance drew praise from his superiors, and he was promoted to brigadier general of volunteers on November 29, 1862. He briefly returned to regimental command until his promotion was confirmed by the U.S. Senate. He commanded the 45th Pennsylvania Infantry at Fredericksburg and during their subsequent move to Newport News, Virginia .

The Senate confirmed Welsh's promotion on March 13, 1863. He was assigned to command the 1st division of IX Corps, sent west to Kentucky, then south to Mississippi to serve under Maj. Gen. Ulysses S. Grant during the siege of Vicksburg, where he was assigned to guard the exterior of the Union line from attack by Confederate General Joseph E. Johnston.

Upon the surrender of Vicksburg, he marched with Maj. Gen. William T. Sherman to Jackson, Mississippi, and defeated the Confederates at the Battle of Jackson. Welsh contracted a malarial fever during this campaign, from which he died in Cincinnati, Ohio, on August 14, 1863. He was buried in Mount Bethel Cemetery in his native Columbia.

== Namesake ==
After the Civil War, Grand Army of the Republic Post #118 in Columbia was named for Welsh. For many years, this was one of the most active G.A.R. posts in Pennsylvania. The Sons of Union Veterans of the Civil War have a General Thomas Welsh Camp in Lancaster.

== See also ==
- List of American Civil War generals (Union)
