= Charles M. Thatcher =

American soldier in the American Civil War

- Born: July 25, 1847; Coldwater, Branch County, Michigan, US
- Died: December 13, 1900 (aged 53); Kalkaska, Kalkaska County, Michigan, US
- Burial place: Evergreen Cemetery, Kalkaska, Kalkaska County, Michigan, US
- Military career
- Allegiance: United States
- Branch: United States Army rank = Private
- Units: Company B, 1st Michigan Sharpshooters
- Conflicts: Battle of the Crater; American Civil War
- Awards: Medal of Honor

Charles M. Thatcher (July 25, 1847 – December 13, 1900) was an American soldier who fought in the American Civil War. Thatcher received his country's highest award for bravery during combat, the Medal of Honor. Thatcher's medal was won for his heroism in the Battle of the Crater in Virginia on July 30, 1864. He was honored with the award on July 31, 1896.

Thatcher was born in Coldwater, Michigan, and entered service On December, 1862, at Grand Haven, he enlisted giving his age as 18. His actual age was 15 years 4 months 12 days. He was buried in Kalkaska, Michigan.

== Medal of Honor citation ==
The President of the United States of America, in the name of Congress, takes pleasure in presenting the Medal of Honor to Private Charles M. Thatcher, United States Army, for extraordinary heroism on 30 July 1864, while serving with Company B, 1st Michigan Sharpshooters, in action at Petersburg, Virginia. Instead of retreating or surrendering when the works were captured, regardless of his personal safety, Private Thatcher continued to return the enemy's fire until he was captured.

== See also ==
- List of American Civil War Medal of Honor recipients: T–Z
