= Department of Washington =

Department of the Union army

The Department of Washington was a department of the Union army constituted on April 9, 1861. It consisted of the District of Columbia to its original boundaries, and the state of Maryland as far as Bladensburg. It was merged into the Military Division of the Potomac on July 25, 1861. Later it was recreated on February 2, 1863 as the consolidated Department of Washington and XXII Corps. It was again made the Department of Washington in 1865 and that command remained until 1869 when it was disbanded.

== Commander, Department of Washington (1861) ==
- Lieutenant Colonel Charles Ferguson Smith, April 10, 1861 to April 28, 1861.
- Colonel Joseph K. Mansfield, April 28, 1861 to March 15, 1862.

== Commander, Department of Washington and XXII Corps (1863-1865) ==
- Major General Samuel P. Heintzelman, February 7, 1863 to October 14, 1863.
- Major General Christopher C. Augur, October 14, 1863 to June 27, 1865.
- John Parke June 6–27, 1865

== Commander, Department of Washington (1865–1869) ==
- Major General John G. Parke, June 7, 1865 – June 26, 1865
- Major General Christopher C. Augur, June 26, 1865 -- August 13, 1866
- Maj. Gen. Edward Canby, August 13, 1866 -- August 31, 1867

Carver Barracks, Washington D.C.

== Posts ==
- Carver Barracks, DC, 1861
- Camp Davis, DC, 1861
- Camp Lacey, DC, 1861

== See also ==
- Civil War Defenses of Washington
- Washington, D.C., in the American Civil War

== Bibliography ==
- Eicher, John H., & Eicher, David J., Civil War High Commands, Stanford University Press, 2001, ISBN 0-8047-3641-3.
- National Archives, Guide to Federal Records; Records of United States Army Continental Commands, 1821–1920 (Record Group 393), 1817–1940 (bulk 1817–1920)
