= John F. Hartranft =

American politician (1830–1889)

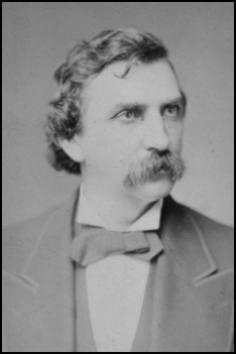

17th Governor of Pennsylvania
- In office January 21, 1873 – January 21, 1879
- Lieutenant: John Latta
- Preceded by: John W. Geary
- Succeeded by: Henry M. Hoyt

13th Auditor General of Pennsylvania
- In office 1866–1872
- Governor: Andrew Gregg Curtin; John W. Geary
- Preceded by: Isaac Slenker
- Succeeded by: Harrison Allen

Personal details
- Born: John Frederick Hartranft; December 16, 1830 New Hanover Township, Pennsylvania, U.S.
- Died: October 17, 1889 (aged 58) Norristown, Pennsylvania, U.S.
- Resting place: Montgomery Cemetery (West Norriton Township, Pennsylvania, U.S.)
- Party: Republican
- Spouse: Sallie Douglas Sebring
- Children: 6
- Profession: Lawyer
- Awards: Medal of Honor

Military service
- Allegiance: United States; Union
- Branch/service: United States Army; Union Army
- Years of service: 1861–1865
- Rank: Brigadier general; Brevet major general
- Unit: 4th Pennsylvania Volunteer Infantry
- Battles/wars: American Civil War; First Battle of Bull Run; Burnside's North Carolina Expedition; Battle of Fredericksburg; Siege of Knoxville; Battle of Campbell's Station; Overland Campaign; Battle of the Wilderness; Battle of Spotsylvania; Siege of Petersburg; Battle of Fort Stedman

John Frederick Hartranft (December 16, 1830 – October 17, 1889) was an American politician and military officer who read the death warrant to the individuals who were executed on July 7, 1865, for conspiring to assassinate American President Abraham Lincoln. Previously having achieved the rank of major general of the Union Army during the American Civil War, he had also been awarded the U.S. Medal of Honor for his actions in the First Battle of Bull Run.

Post-war, he served as the 17th governor of Pennsylvania from 1873 to 1879.

== Early life and career ==
Hartranft was born in Fagleysville, a village in New Hanover Township, Pennsylvania, near Pottstown, the son of ethnic German Americans Mary Lydia (Bucher) and Samuel Engle Hartranft.

Hartranft had some local schooling in Norristown, where his family moved when he was a boy. He attended Marshall College in Mercersburg, a forerunner of Franklin & Marshall College in Lancaster. He moved to New York, where he completed his degree in civil engineering in 1853 from Union College in Schenectady.

He briefly worked for two railroads in eastern Pennsylvania before returning home to Norristown to assist his father in the real estate and stage line businesses. In 1854, the young man was appointed deputy sheriff of Montgomery County, Pennsylvania. That year, he married Sallie Douglas Sebring. They had six children, but three died in infancy.

Hartranft was active in the Norristown fire company and the local Freemason lodge. After "reading the law" as an apprentice with an established firm, Hartranft was admitted to the bar in 1860. He entered the Pennsylvania Militia, being promoted to the rank of colonel.

== Civil War ==
In April 1861, Hartranft raised a Montgomery County regiment of 90-day volunteers in Norristown, serving as colonel of the 4th Pennsylvania Volunteer Infantry. When their term of enlistment was up, the regiment returned to Pennsylvania, although it was the eve of the First Battle of Bull Run, and firing had already begun. Hartranft was humiliated by his men's decision to go home.

He stayed to fight with the Army on July 21, 1861. This act earned him the Medal of Honor on August 21, 1886, for volunteering his services to fellow Pennsylvanian Col. William B. Franklin. His citation reads: "Voluntarily served as an aide and participated in the battle after expiration of his term of service, distinguishing himself in rallying several regiments which had been thrown into confusion."

Hartranft raised a three-year regiment, the 51st Pennsylvania Infantry, and became its colonel. They first served on the North Carolina coast in the Burnside Expedition. Hartranft led them in battle at Roanoke Island and New Bern. In July 1862, Hartranft's men proceeded to Newport News, Virginia, to become part of Burnside's IX Corps, with whom they fought in the Second Battle of Bull Run and at South Mountain. They also fought at the Battle of Antietam, where Hartranft led the famous charge across Burnside's Bridge, suffering 120 casualties. They later participated in the Battle of Fredericksburg. The 51st Pennsylvania was transferred to the Western Theater, where Hartranft saw action at the battles of Vicksburg, Campbell's Station, and Knoxville; in the latter two actions, he served as commander of the 2nd Division of the IX Corps while still a colonel.

He commanded the 1st Brigade, 3rd Division, of the IX Corps in the 1864 Overland Campaign, participating in the fighting at the Wilderness and Spotsylvania. He was promoted to brigadier general as of May 12, 1864. He continued in operations against Richmond and Petersburg. His brigade distinguished itself in the Battle of Peebles' Farm.

When the IX Corps was reorganized, Hartranft was given command of a new 3rd Division, consisting of newly raised Pennsylvania regiments. Hartranft was brevetted major general by Lt. Gen. Ulysses S. Grant for defeating Confederate General Robert E. Lee's last offensive at the Battle of Fort Stedman. He brought his untested division from its reserve position and counterattacked to recover the captured fort.

== Imprisonment, trial and execution of the Lincoln assassination conspirators ==
Alexander Gardner photograph of Gen. John F. Hartranft and staff, responsible for securing the conspirators at the Arsenal. Top row left to right: Lt. Col. S. W. Frehrich; Lt. Geissinger; Surgeon G. L. Porter. Bottom row left to right: Capt. A. R. Watts; Lt. Col. W. H. McCall; Gen. Hartranft; Col. L. A. Dodd; Capt C. Roth

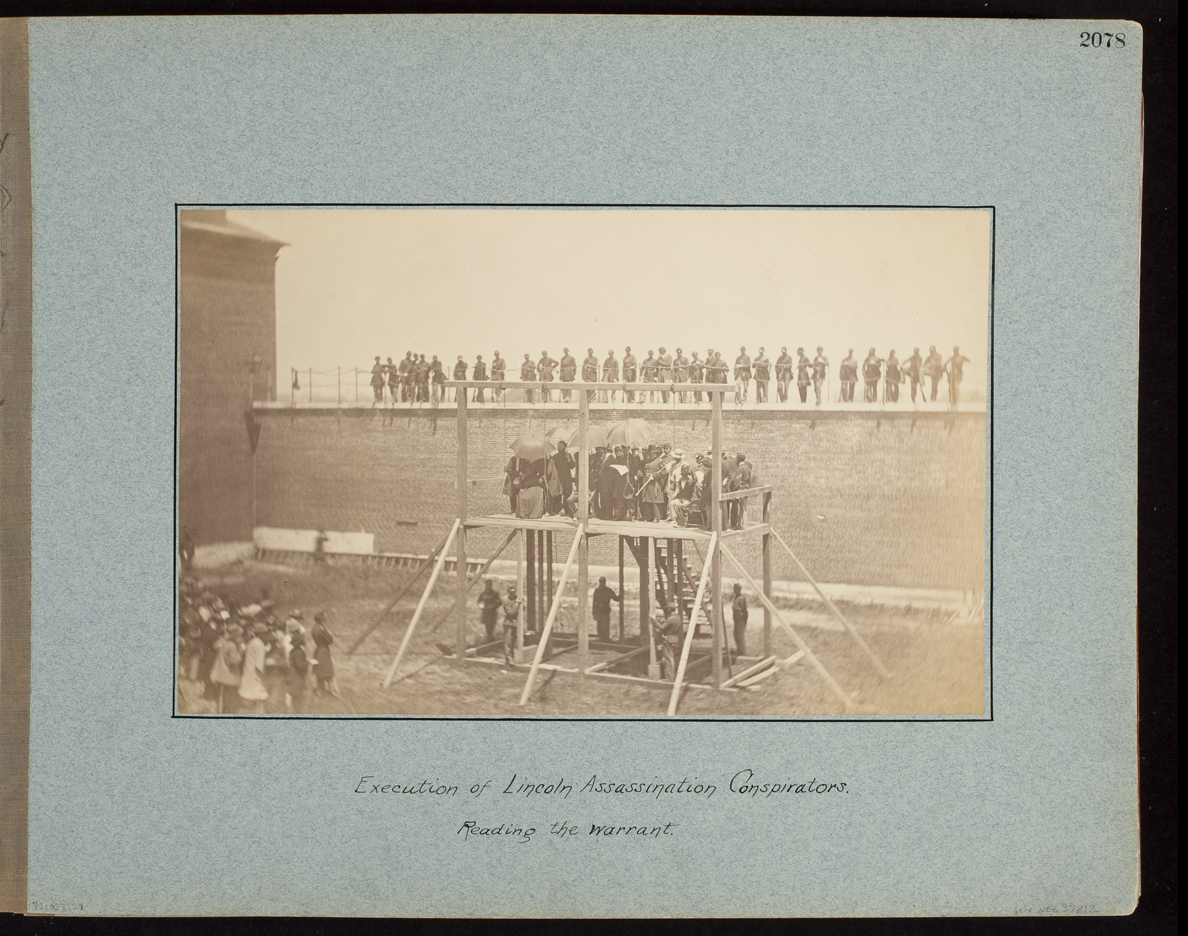
Gen. Hartranft reading the Warrant July 7, 1865

In the aftermath of the assassination of United States President Abraham Lincoln, Hartranft was appointed both commanding officer of the Old Capitol Prison in Washington, D.C., and as a special provost marshal during the trial of those accused in the Lincoln assassination: George Atzerodt, David Herold, Lewis Paine (also known as Lewis Powell), and Mary Surratt, who would become the first woman to be executed by the U.S. government. The trial lasted from May 9, 1865, until the conviction of the Atzerodt, Herold, Paine, and Surratt in late June. At 1:15 p.m. on July 7, 1865, Hartranft led the four to the gallows in what is now called Fort Lesley McNair. When asked if the convicted had any final statements, the spiritual advisors of Atzerodt and Payne stated that both men wished to thank Hartranft and the officers and soldiers serving under him for the kindness they displayed during their incarceration. Following prayers for each of the prisoners, "Gen. Hartranft read the order of the War Department, embracing the President's Executive Order, for the execution", according to The New York Times. The prisoners were then simultaneously executed by hanging at 1:25 p.m.

== Post-war life and political career ==
Following the war Hartranft switched party allegiances and became a Republican. He was appointed to serve in former general John W. Geary's Pennsylvania administration as Auditor General from 1867 to 1873.

Hartranft was elected as governor in 1872. He was a strong advocate of education, municipal reform, regulation of banking, improved industry and commerce, and the reorganization of the National Guard. He supported suffrage for African Americans, fought the corrupt Simon Cameron political machine, and championed the rights of the workingman.

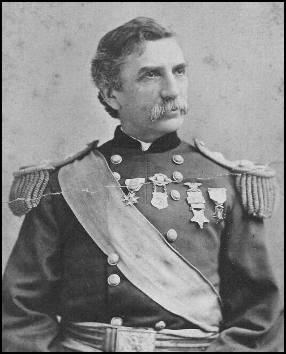
John F. Hartranft after the American Civil War

During his administration, the revision of the Commonwealth's constitution was completed and ratified as the Constitution of 1873. It prohibited special and local legislation; and increased the terms for state legislators: House terms were increased to two years instead of one, and Senate terms to four years from three.

He was elected as a member of the American Philosophical Society in 1876.

He was the 5th commander-in-chief of the Union veterans' organization, the Grand Army of the Republic, serving from 1875 to 1877. He was also a member of the Military Order of the Loyal Legion of the United States.

The United States celebrated its centennial as a nation in 1876. Hartranft saw that Pennsylvania led the way in the celebration that was centered in Philadelphia's Fairmount Park.

At the Republican National Convention in June 1876, he was a contender for the presidential nomination, but Rutherford B. Hayes of Ohio was eventually selected. He had served with Hartranft during the Civil War in the same army corps.

During his second term, economic depression, low wages in industry and unemployment, following the industrial boom of the early 1870s, resulted in national labor unrest and strikes culminating in the Great Railroad Strike of 1877. Serious civil disturbances included riots associated with the railroad and general strikes of 1877 in several industrial cities: including Philadelphia, Pittsburgh, Reading and Scranton. (Note: See also Pittsburgh railway riots, Scranton General Strike, Reading Railroad massacre, and 1877 Shamokin uprising) There were other incidents with the Molly Maguires in the anthracite coal regions. Hartranft called out the state militia and then Regular Army troops to maintain order. In Philadelphia, Reading, and Pittsburgh, fires were set and extensive railroad facilities and equipment burned, especially in Pittsburgh. Eleven people died along the Schuylkill River before Federal troops restored the peace. Hartranft later proposed recognition of labor unions and arbitration of claims.

Concerned with the governor's precedent in calling out the militia to battle civilians in Pittsburgh, the District Attorney of Allegheny County tried to force Hartranft to appear before a grand jury to explain his rationale. The courts backed Hartranft when he refused to appear. Their ruling became known as the "Hartranft Decision."

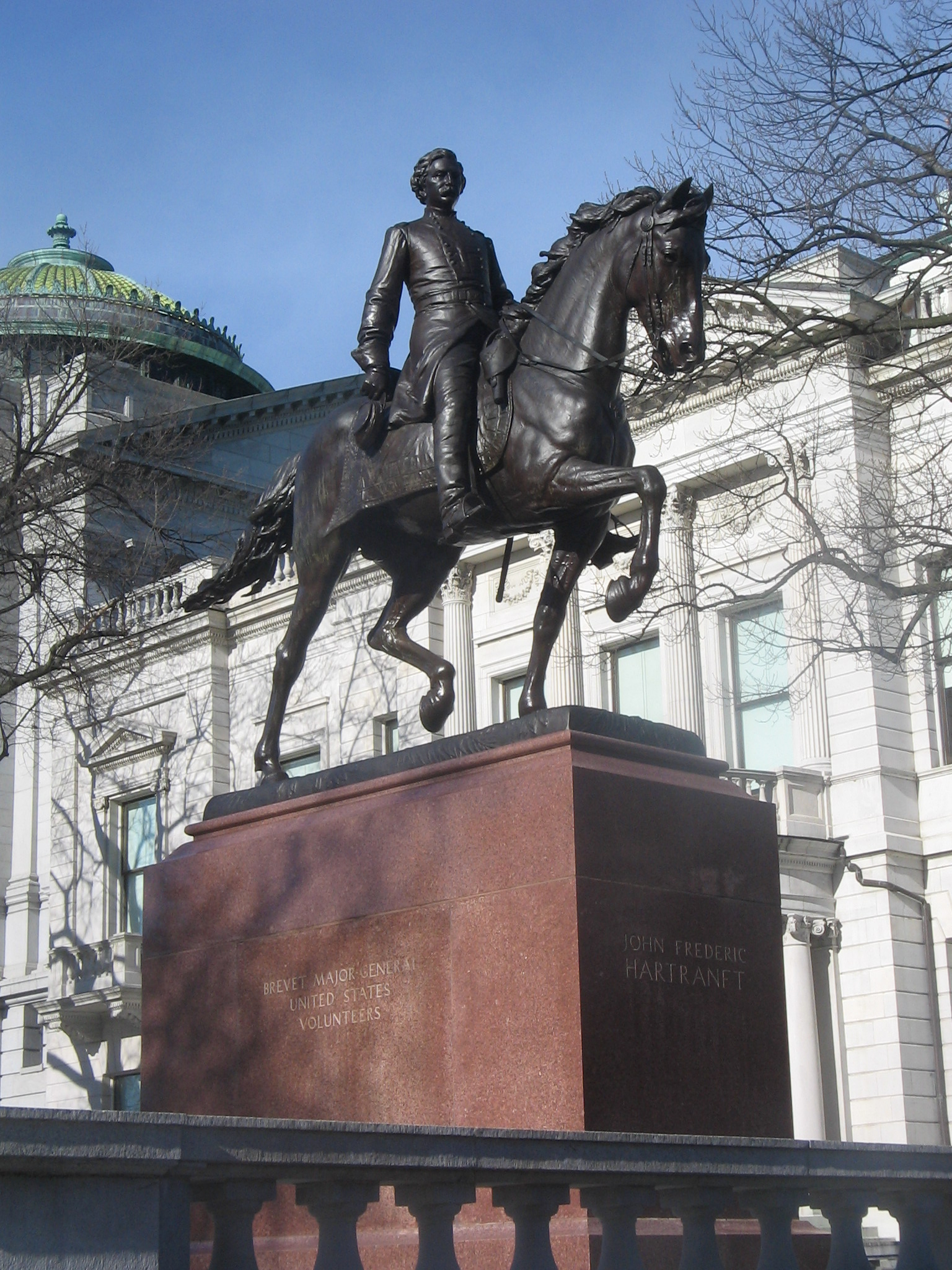
Hartranft's statue on the Pennsylvania State Capitol grounds

Hartranft returned to his home in Montgomery County in 1879, where he accepted the position of US Postmaster. He was subsequently appointed as Port Collector for Philadelphia (1881–1885). He was also reappointed to command the Pennsylvania National Guard, which he had helped develop.

On August 26, 1886, Hartranft was awarded the Medal of Honor for valor during the First Battle of Bull Run in 1861.

John Hartranft died in Norristown and was buried in Montgomery Cemetery in West Norriton Township, Pennsylvania, near Norristown. The Pennsylvania National Guard later provided an obelisk for his grave.

He was succeeded as commander of the Pennsylvania National Guard Division by George R. Snowden.

== In memoriam ==
Designations

Pennsylvania Historical Marker
- Official name: John F. Hartranft
- Type: Roadside
- Criteria: Civil War, Government & Politics, Government & Politics 19th Century, Governors, Military
- Designated: May 6, 1947
- Location: Sanatoga Rd. & Cross Rd., SW of Fagleysville
- Marker Text: The birthplace of John F. Hartranft, Civil War hero and Pennsylvania Governor, 1873–79, is to the right on the side road. He reorganized the State Militia as part of the National Guard.

An equestrian statue was installed next to the Pennsylvania Capitol Building in Harrisburg honors Hartranft. Camp No. 15 of the Sons of Union Veterans of the Civil War is named in his honor. Marble monuments at Petersburg and Vicksburg honor his Civil War service. An elementary school in Norristown is named for the governor as well as another elementary school in Philadelphia.

The Hartranft section of North Philadelphia, and a street in the Packer Park section of South Philadelphia near the sports complex, both in Philadelphia, were also named in his honor. A residence hall at the University Park campus of Pennsylvania State University is named after him. Three avenues in Montgomery County, Pennsylvania, are named in his honor: the first is in Norristown and is the avenue leading to the cemetery in which he is buried. The other avenues are located in nearby East Norriton Township and in Fort Washington, Upper Dublin Township. A street in the Brookline section of Pittsburgh is also named after him.

Beginning in 1899, a General Hartranft cigar brand was manufactured by C. E. Blair and Sons in Harrisburg.

== Medal of Honor citation ==
Rank and organization: Colonel, 4th Pennsylvania Militia. Place and date: At Bull Run, Virginia, July 21, 1861. Entered service at: Norristown, Pennsylvania. Born: December 16, 1830, New Hanover Township, Pennsylvania. Date of issue: August 26, 1886.

Citation:

Voluntarily served as an aide and participated in the battle after expiration of his term of service, distinguishing himself in rallying several regiments which had been thrown into confusion.

== See also ==
- List of Medal of Honor recipients
- List of American Civil War Medal of Honor recipients: G–L
- List of American Civil War generals (Union)

== Notes ==
Party political offices
Preceded by John W. Geary	Republican nominee for Governor of Pennsylvania; 1872, 1875	Succeeded by Henry M. Hoyt
Political offices
Preceded by Isaac Slenker	Pennsylvania Auditor General; 1866–1872	Succeeded by Harrison Allen
Preceded by John White Geary	Governor of Pennsylvania; 1873–1879	Succeeded by Henry Martin Hoyt
Preceded by Charles Devens	Commander-in-Chief of the Grand Army of the Republic; 1875–1877	Succeeded by John C. Robinson
