= A Stillness at Appomattox =

1953 book by Bruce Catton

- First edition
- Author: Bruce Catton
- Language: English
- Series: Army of the Potomac trilogy
- Subject: American Civil War
- Publisher: Doubleday and Company
- Publication date: 1953
- Publication place: United States
- Pages: 438
- Preceded by: Glory Road

A Stillness at Appomattox (1953) is a non-fiction history book written by Bruce Catton. It recounts the American Civil War's final year, describing the campaigns of Ulysses S. Grant in Virginia during 1864 to the end of the war in 1865. It is the final volume of Catton's Army of the Potomac trilogy, having been preceded by Mr. Lincoln's Army (1951) and Glory Road (1952).

== Content ==
A Stillness at Appomattox is a history of the American Civil War that recounts the final year. Some of Catton's extensive work describes the Battle of the Wilderness, the assault of the Mule Shoe at the Battle of Spotsylvania Court House, the Battle of Cold Harbor, the Battle of the Crater and the Battle of Appomattox Courthouse.

Catton's work describes the campaigns of Ulysses S. Grant in Virginia during 1864. The lengthy work follows Grant's campaigns from early 1864 to the end of the war. Other American Civil War generals he describes include George Gordon Meade, Philip Sheridan, and Robert E. Lee.

It is the third volume of the Army of the Potomac trilogy that includes Mr. Lincoln's Army (1951) and Glory Road (1952).

== Sources ==
In his book's endnotes, Catton wrote that he used official war records, various collections of unpublished letters written by Federal soldiers, personal diaries of spouses and relatives, memoirs of soldiers and their families, Also mentioned are many autobiographies, biographical studies, and memoirs of descendants of soldiers and ranking personnel. A collection of letters from Major General Ulysses S. Grant III is used for its anecdotes and family recollections about his famous grandfather Ulysses S. Grant.

The book's bibliography lists more than 200 works. Catton notes that he relied heavily on War of the Rebellion: A Compilation of the Official Records of the Union and Confederate Armies, published by the United States Department of War in 1902. Other major works he consulted were Appleton's Cyclopedia of American Biography (1888), edited by James Grant Wilson and John Fiske, and Dictionary of American Biography (1943), edited by Dumas Malone.

== Awards ==
- A Stillness at Appomattox won the 1954 National Book Award for Nonfiction.

The citation of the award reads:

Mr. Catton has combined historical accuracy with poetic insight to present the story of the Army of the Potomac in the final year of the Civil War. Writing from the point of view of the citizens who found themselves soldiers he has reaffirmed the great American tradition of a peace-loving people who, faced with necessity, can also produce greatness in war.

- A Stillness at Appomattox won the 1954 Pulitzer Prize for History.
