= Names from the War =

Poem by Bruce Catton

Names from the War is a long poem about the American Civil War by Civil War historian Bruce Catton, published in 1960. The context is the Civil War Centennial. It was set to music by Alec Wilder, using folk melodies from Carl Sandburg's American Songbook. It calls for narrator, chorus, brass quintet, and woodwind quintet. It was released on LP in 1961, with Dave Garroway as the narrator. It has apparently never been performed in a concert setting.

In it, Catton talks about "quiet names of doom", which previously had no special significance, but now "they will live as long as America remembers.". These are names—Sharpsburg and Spotsylvania begin the list—from postmarks on envelopes containing letters soldiers sent to their families, although sometimes the names arrived on official death notices before the letters did. Geographical names like "Missionary Ridge" were not postmarks. Others, like Bloody Lane, were coined by the soldiers themselves. There are names of churches—Shiloh, New Hope—, names of houses people lived in, and finally "the haunted road that led past Sailor's Creek to Appomattox".

Now the agony is gone, those who grieved are now dead themselves, the "bitterness and hot bewildered fury" have faded. What remains are the names: they still clang when we touch them. "What America is grew out of them."

== See also ==
- A Lincoln Portrait
