= American Civil War Centennial =

Official US commemoration of the American Civil War

The American Civil War Centennial was the official United States commemoration of the American Civil War. Commemoration activities began in 1957, four years before the 100th anniversary of the war's first battle, and ended in 1965 with the 100th anniversary of the surrender at Appomattox.

== Centennial Commissions ==
The public commemoration of the Civil War began with Congress' 1957 creation of the United States Civil War Centennial Commission. The Commission was asked to work with, and encourage, the U.S. states (especially the ones created before the war) to create commissions to commemorate the war, and to some extent coordinate centennial activities by the private sector.

Neither Congress nor President Dwight D. Eisenhower sought a unified theme for these commemorations. To avoid this, the law creating the federal Commission reflected clear expectations that most of the implementation work of the commemoration would be carried out by the various state commissions. Almost all of the states did indeed set up centennial commissions.

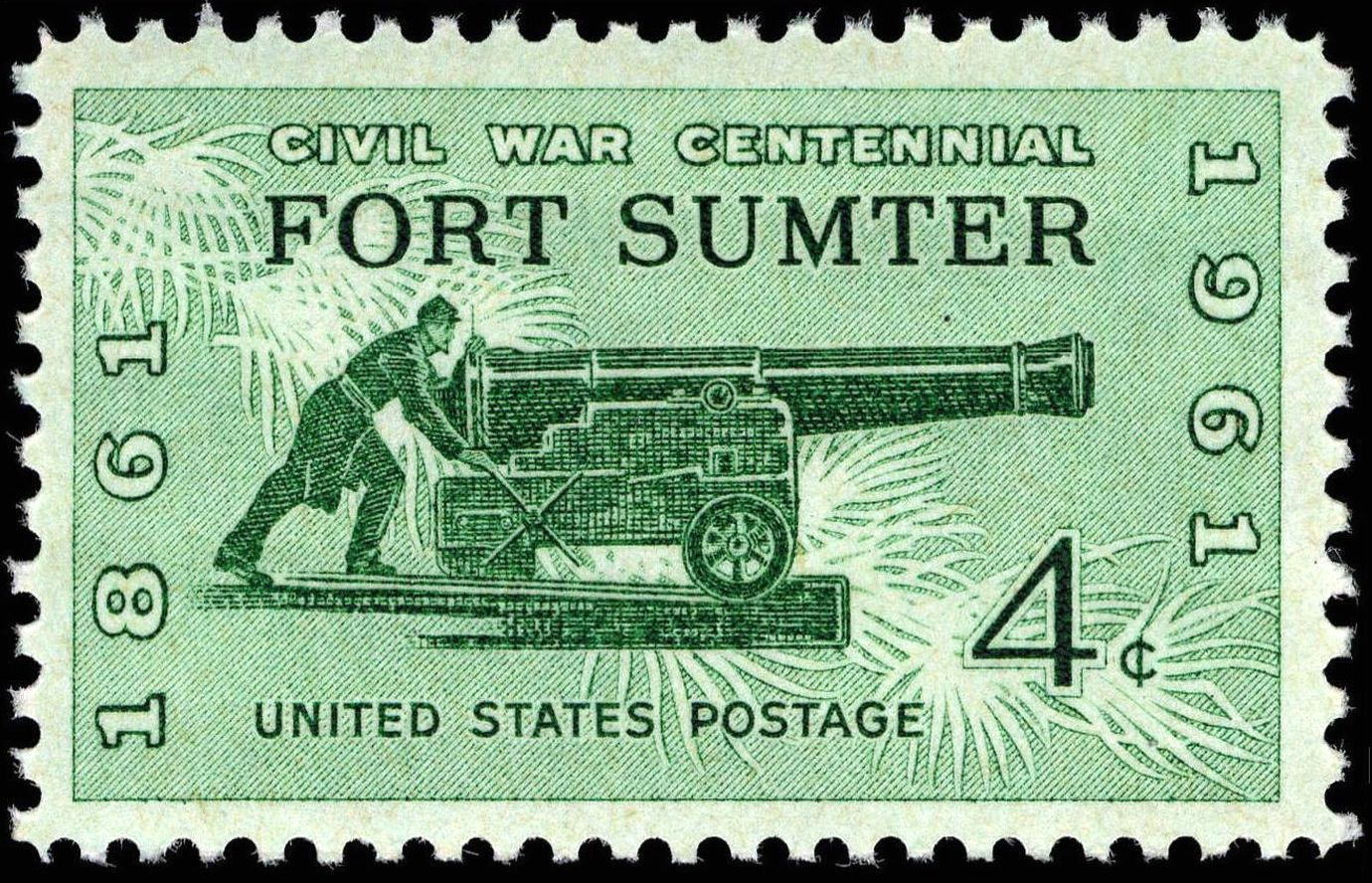
A 1961 Civil War Centennial postage stamp depicts a cannon and its gunner.

At the same time, the National Park Service and other federal agencies that controlled key Civil War battlefields, used the Centennial to successfully lobby Congress for increased funding to re-landscape and interpret these battlefields for the general public. The U.S. Post Office issued a series of commemorative stamps to mark the centennial.

At the national Commission, key members urged different priorities. Emory University Professor Bell Wiley recommended a major effort to document and preserve information from historic letters, newspapers, and public documents. Ulysses S. Grant III, the first chairman, wanted to emphasize large events that appealed to the public, such as "sham battles" or reenactments. Businessman Karl Betts, the Commission's first executive director, looked for ways it could spur economic development. They agreed on a Cold War consensus to the effect that all Americans were ideologically united, with the result that potentially divisive civil rights issues were not emphasized. The shadow of ongoing conflict over the civil rights movement affected these commemorative activities.

=== Differing themes ===
The same geographical divisions that had helped spark the Civil War itself also affected the works of the separate state commissions that tried to oversee the Centennial. Not surprisingly, the Northern states' commissions and the Southern states' commissions looked at the war in very different ways, used different keywords and phrases to reflect their viewpoints, and sponsored and encouraged different public memorials and activities.

In particular, the governments of U.S. Southern states saw the Civil War centennial as an opportunity to reinforce their view that the infrastructure of Jim Crow and segregation was an organic reflection of a distinctive Southern "way of life." Many white Southerners responded with enthusiasm to invitations to celebrate their heritage, which they saw as one of courage on the battlefield and continuity afterwards. For the first time, many Americans, especially white Southerners, volunteered or were recruited into historical reenactment groups that performed pageants and re-creations of Civil War battles, field maneuvers, and encampments.

The Centennial also saw efforts to use the various commemorations as a launching pad for serious adult education on the facts and issues surrounding the war. Historian Robert J. Cook, in a 2007 study of the commemoration, argues that these efforts were unsuccessful and constituted a missed opportunity.

=== Legacy ===
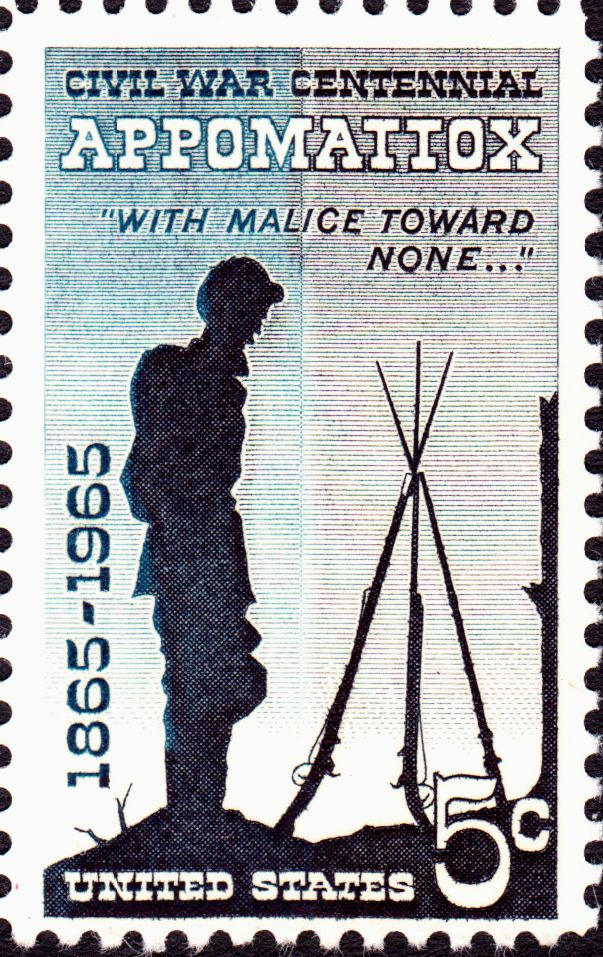
Issuance of this postage stamp in April 1965 marked the end of the Civil War Centennial.

One major legacy of the Civil War Centennial was the creation of an infrastructure of Civil War reenactment. At least two major Civil War battlefields, Pea Ridge National Military Park in Arkansas and Wilson's Creek National Battlefield in Missouri, were added to the roster of parklands administered by the National Park Service during the Centennial years. Civil War-related state parks, such as Perryville Battlefield State Historic Site in Kentucky, also trace their heritage back to the Centennial years. In addition, much of the current interpretive infrastructure of other major American Civil War battlefields dates back to planning decisions made in the early 1960s.

Before 1957, celebrants of Southern heritage had adopted a wide variety of signs and symbols. In the late 1950s, many white Southerners united around a modified version of the battle flag of the Army of Northern Virginia as the flag to be used in commemoration of the Centennial, and this flag was raised at many 100th-anniversary events. For example, the modified Confederate flag was raised on the grounds of the South Carolina State House in April 1961 as part of the 100th-anniversary commemoration by South Carolina's government of the reduction of Fort Sumter. Eleven months later, state lawmakers passed a law requiring the flag's commemorative appearance be made permanent and that the flag be flown over the capitol itself. This decision (reversed in 2015 after the Charleston church shooting) accompanied white resistance to integration and the civil rights movement.

== Cultural commemoration ==
Alec Wilder's Names from the War (1961), based on a long poem of the same name by Civil War historian Bruce Catton, was written for the centennial.

== See also ==
- American Civil War reenactment
- Lost Cause of the Confederacy
