= Bruce Catton =

U.S. historian, author, and journalist (1899–1978)

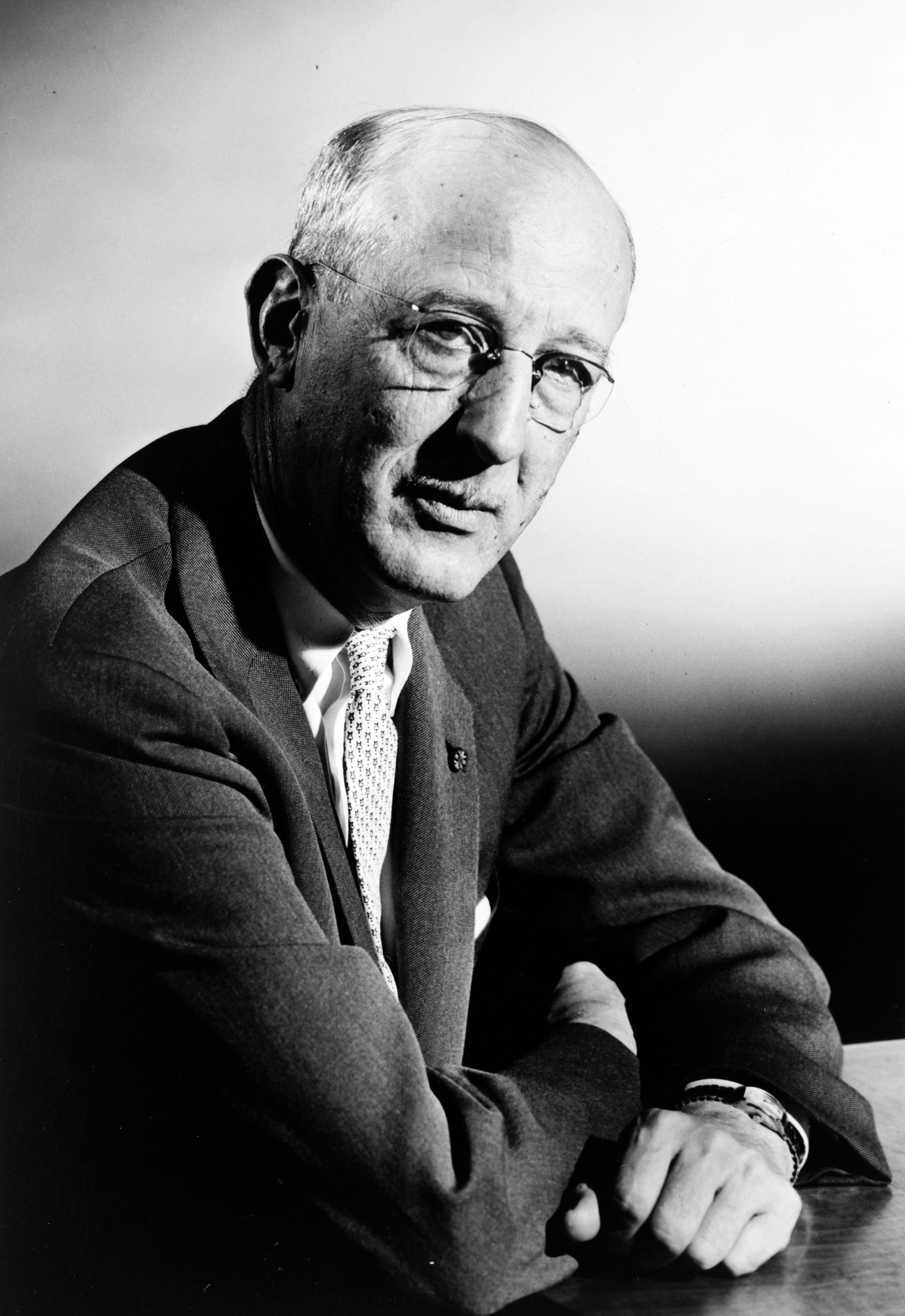
- Bruce Catton, c. 1960s.
- Born: Charles Bruce Catton; October 9, 1899; Petoskey, Michigan, U.S.
- Died: August 28, 1978 (aged 78); Frankfort, Michigan, U.S.
- Occupations: Journalist, author
- Spouse: Hazel H. Cherry
- Children: William Bruce Catton
- Writing career
- Period: 1948–1978
- Genre: History
- Subject: American Civil War

Charles Bruce Catton (October 9, 1899 – August 28, 1978) was an American historian and journalist who wrote books concerning the American Civil War. As a narrative historian, Catton specialized in popular history, featuring interesting characters and historical vignettes, in addition to the basic facts, dates, and analyses. His books were well researched and included footnotes. He won the Pulitzer Prize for History and the National Book Award for Nonfiction in 1954 for his book A Stillness at Appomattox (1953), a study of the final campaign of the war in Virginia and third book in his Army of the Potomac trilogy.

== Early life ==
Charles Bruce Catton was born in Petoskey, Michigan, to George R. and Adela M. (Patten) Catton, and raised in Benzonia, Michigan. His father was a Congregationalist minister, who accepted a teaching position in Benzonia Academy and later became the academy's headmaster. As a boy, Catton first heard the reminiscences of the aged veterans who had fought in the Civil War. In his memoir, Waiting for the Morning Train (1972), Catton explained how their stories made a lasting impression upon him:

[These stories gave] a color and a tone not merely to our village life, but to the concept of life with which we grew up ... I think I was always subconsciously driven by an attempt to restate that faith and to show where it was properly grounded, how it grew out of what a great many young men on both sides felt and believed and were brave enough to do.

During 1916, Catton attended Oberlin College, but he quit because of World War I without completing a degree.

== Journalism career ==
After serving briefly with the United States Navy during World War I, Catton became a reporter and editor for the newspapers The Cleveland News (as a freelance reporter), the Boston American (1920–1924), and the Cleveland Plain Dealer (1925). From 1926 to 1941, he worked for the Newspaper Enterprise Association, a Scripps-Howard syndicate), for which he wrote editorials and book reviews, as well as serving as a Washington, D.C. correspondent. Catton tried twice to complete his studies, but found himself repeatedly distracted by his newspaper work. Oberlin College awarded him an honorary degree in 1956.

== Writing career ==
At the start of World War II, Catton was too old for military service. During 1941, he accepted a position as Director of Information for the War Production Board, and later he had similar jobs in the Department of Commerce and the Department of the Interior. His experiences as a federal employee prepared him to write his first book, The War Lords Of Washington, during 1948. Although the book was not a commercial success, it inspired Catton to quit federal employment to become a full-time author.

In 1954, Catton accepted the position as founding editor of the new magazine American Heritage. Catton served initially as a writer, reviewer, and editor. In the first issue, he wrote:

We intend to deal with that great, unfinished and illogically inspiring story of the American people doing, being and becoming. Our American heritage is greater than any one of us. It can express itself in very homely truths; in the end it can lift up our eyes beyond the glow in the sunset skies.

=== Army of the Potomac trilogy ===
In the early 1950s, Catton published three books known collectively as the Army of the Potomac trilogy, a history of that army. For Mr. Lincoln's Army (1951), the first volume, Catton recounted the army's formation, the command of George B. McClellan, the Peninsula Campaign, the Northern Virginia Campaign, and the Battle of Antietam. For the second volume, Glory Road (1952), Catton recounted the army's history with new commanding generals, from the Battle of Fredericksburg to the Battle of Gettysburg. For his final volume of the trilogy, A Stillness at Appomattox (1953), Catton recounted the campaigns of Ulysses S. Grant in Virginia from 1864 to the end of the war in 1865. It was his first commercially successful work and it won both the Pulitzer Prize for History and a National Book Award for Nonfiction. The three volumes were reissued in 1984 as a single volume reprint, titled Bruce Catton's Civil War. In 2022 the books were reissued in one volume by the Library of America.

=== Centennial History of the Civil War ===
From 1961 to 1965, the Centennial of the Civil War was commemorated, and Catton published his Centennial History of the Civil War trilogy. Unlike his previous trilogy, these books emphasized not only military topics, but social, economic, and political topics as well. For the first volume, The Coming Fury (1961), Catton discussed the causes of the war, culminating in its first major combat operation, the First Battle of Bull Run. For the second volume, Terrible Swift Sword (1963), he discussed both sides as they mobilized for a massive war effort. The story continued through 1862, ending with McClellan's dismissal after the Battle of Antietam. For the third volume, Never Call Retreat (1965), the war continued through the battles of Vicksburg and Gettysburg, and the bloody struggles of 1864 and 1865 before the final surrender.

=== Ulysses S. Grant trilogy ===
After the publication of Captain Sam Grant (1950) by historian and biographer Lloyd Lewis, Catton wrote the second and third volumes of this trilogy, making extensive use of Lewis's historical research, provided by his widow, Kathryn Lewis, who personally selected Catton to continue her husband's work. In Grant Moves South (1960), Catton discussed the increasing experience of Grant as a military commander, from victories at the Battle of Fort Henry and the Battle of Fort Donelson, to the Battle of Shiloh and the Vicksburg Campaign. In Grant Takes Command (1969), Catton discussed Grant's career from the Battle of Chattanooga (1863) through the 1864 Virginia campaigns against Robert E. Lee and the end of the war.

=== Other Civil War books ===
In addition to these three important trilogies, Catton wrote extensively about the Civil War throughout his career. In U. S. Grant and the American Military Tradition (1954), Catton writes what many consider one of the best short biographies of the general. In Banners at Shenandoah: A Story of Sheridan's Fighting Cavalry (1955), Catton wrote for young people about Union cavalry commander Philip Sheridan in the Shenandoah Valley during 1864. This Hallowed Ground (1956) was an account of the war from the Union perspective. Upon its publication, it was widely considered the best single volume history of the Civil War, receiving a Fletcher Pratt Award from the Civil War Round Table of New York during 1957.

In America Goes to War (1958), Catton made the case that the American Civil War was one of the first total wars. In The American Heritage Picture History of the Civil War (1960), Catton wrote the accompanying narrative to a book that included more than 800 paintings and period photographs (this book was republished without pictures in 2004 by Mariner Books as The Civil War, with an introduction by James M. McPherson). It received a special Pulitzer Prize citation during 1961. In The American Heritage Short History of the Civil War (1960), Catton offers a narrative that discussed the military and political aspects of the war. In Two Roads to Sumter (1963), written with his son William, Catton recounted the 15 years prior to the war, as considered from the points of view of the two main politicians involved in the conflict: Abraham Lincoln and Jefferson Davis. In Gettysburg: The Final Fury (1974), Catton offered a slim volume concerning the Battle of Gettysburg, dominated by photographs and illustrations.

=== Other books ===
In addition to Civil War histories, Catton published other books, including The War Lords Of Washington (1948), an account of Washington, D.C., during World War II, based on his experiences in the federal government, Four Days: The Historical Record Of The Death Of President Kennedy (1964), a 144-page collaboration of the American Heritage magazine and United Press International on the John F. Kennedy assassination, and Waiting for the Morning Train (1972), about the author's Michigan boyhood. Toward the end of his life, Catton published Michigan: A Bicentennial History (1976) and The Bold & Magnificent Dream: America's Founding Years, 1492–1815 (1978).

=== Poetry ===
Names from the War (1960), a long poem, was published in 1960. It was set to music by Alec Wilder.

== Reception ==
In a review of Catton's memoir, Waiting for the Morning Train, New York Times writer Webster Schott wrote, looking back over Catton's career, that "As much as anyone who has ever written about the Civil War, Bruce Catton made it real. Catton not only told us how and why it happened, he made us feel it. He brought to his writing an extraordinary combination of scholarship, literary skill and intimate concern."

Oliver Jensen, who succeeded Catton as editor of American Heritage, wrote that "No one ever wrote American history with more easy grace, beauty and emotional power, or greater understanding of its meaning, than Bruce Catton... There is a near-magic power of imagination in Catton’s work [that] almost seemed to project him physically onto the battlefields, along the dusty roads and to the campfires of another age."

Conversely, American writer Gore Vidal criticized Catton for a hagiographic approach to writing about prominent Americans of the past, calling him "that ubiquitous clone of Parson Weems." Vidal groups Catton with American historians who "never accept as a fact anything that might obscure those figures illuminated by the high noon of Demos...." As an example, he cites Catton's dismissal of stories related to Grant's alcohol consumption during the Civil War and places Catton "in Parson Weems land where all our presidents were good and some were great and none ever served out his term without visibly growing in office."

== Personal life ==
On August 16, 1925, Catton married Hazel H. Cherry. In 1926, they had a son, William Bruce Catton, who taught history at Princeton University and at Middlebury College, Vermont, where he was the first Charles A. Dana Professor of History.

== Death and legacy ==
Bruce Catton died in a hospital near his summer home at Frankfort, Michigan, after a respiratory illness. He was buried in Benzonia Township Cemetery in Benzie County, Michigan.

During 1977, the year before his death, Catton received the Presidential Medal of Freedom, the nation's greatest civilian honor, from President Gerald R. Ford, who noted that the author and historian "made us hear the sounds of battle and cherish peace."

Of the many Civil War historians, Catton was arguably the most prolific and popular. Oliver Jensen, who succeeded him as editor of the magazine American Heritage, wrote:

No one ever wrote American history with more easy grace, beauty and emotional power, or greater understanding of its meaning, than Bruce Catton. There is a near-magic power of imagination in Catton's work that seemed to project him physically into the battlefields, along the dusty roads and to the campfires of another age.

The Bruce Catton Collection is housed in the Archives of The Citadel, the Military College of South Carolina.

=== Bruce Catton Prize ===
From 1984 to 2006, the Bruce Catton Prize was awarded for lifetime achievement in the writing of history. In cooperation with American Heritage Publishing Company, the Society of American Historians initiated the biennial prize that honors a writer's entire body of work. The prize consists of a certificate and $2,500.

The prize was awarded to Dumas Malone (1984), C. Vann Woodward (1986), Richard B. Morris (1988), Henry Steele Commager (1990), Edmund S. Morgan (1992), John Hope Franklin (1994), Arthur Schlesinger, Jr. (1996), Richard N. Current (1998), Bernard Bailyn (2000), Gerda Lerner (2002), David Brion Davis (2004), and David Herbert Donald (2006).

== Works ==
=== Nonfiction ===
- The War Lords of Washington. New York: Harcourt, Brace, & Co., 1948.
- U.S. Grant and the American Military Tradition. Boston: Little, Brown and Company, 1954.
- This Hallowed Ground. New York: Doubleday and Company, 1956.
- America Goes to War. Middletown: Wesleyan University Press, 1958.
- The American Heritage Picture History of the Civil War. New York: American Heritage Publishing, 1960 (republished as The Civil War without the pictures by Mariner Books in 2004 and with an introduction by author James M. McPherson).
- The American Heritage Short History of the Civil War. New York: American Heritage Publishing, 1960.
- Michigan's Past and the Nation's Future. Detroit: Wayne State University Press, 1960
- Four Days: The Historical Record Of The Death Of President Kennedy. New York: American Heritage Publishing, 1964.
- Prefaces to History. New York: Doubleday and Company, 1970
- Waiting for the Morning Train. New York: Doubleday and Company, 1972.
- Gettysburg: The Final Fury. New York: Doubleday and Company, 1974.
- Michigan: A Bicentennial History. New York: W. W. Norton & Company, 1976.
- Bruce Catton's America: Selections from His Greatest Works. New York: American Heritage, 1979
- Reflections on the Civil War. New York: Doubleday and Company, 1981
- Shiloh. Boston: New Word City, 2017.
- Missionary Ridge. Boston: New Word City, 2017.

==== Army of the Potomac trilogy ====
- Mr. Lincoln's Army. New York: Doubleday and Company, 1951.
- Glory Road. New York: Doubleday and Company, 1952.
- A Stillness at Appomattox. New York: Doubleday and Company, 1953.

==== Centennial History of the Civil War trilogy ====
- The Coming Fury. New York: Doubleday and Company, 1961.
- Terrible Swift Sword. New York: Doubleday and Company, 1963.
- Never Call Retreat. New York: Doubleday and Company, 1965.

==== Ulysses S. Grant trilogy ====
- Grant Moves South. Boston: Little, Brown and Company, 1960.
- Grant Takes Command. Boston: Little, Brown and Company, 1969.

Note: These two volumes are sequels to historian Lloyd Lewis's posthumously published Captain Sam Grant (Boston: Little, Brown and Company, 1950.)

==== With William Catton ====
- Two Roads to Sumter. New York: McGraw-Hill, 1963.
- The Bold & Magnificent Dream: America's Founding Years, 1492–1815. New York: Doubleday and Company, 1978.

=== Fiction ===
- Banners at Shenandoah: A Story of Sheridan's Fighting Cavalry. New York: Doubleday and Company, 1955.

== Honors and awards ==
- 1954 National Book Award for Nonfiction for A Stillness at Appomattox
- 1954 Pulitzer Prize for History for A Stillness at Appomattox
- 1959 Meritorious Service Award in the Field of Civil War History, presented by Harry S. Truman
- 1977 Presidential Medal of Freedom, presented by Gerald R. Ford
- From 1956 to 1978, Catton received 26 honorary degrees from colleges and universities across the United States
