= Army of Northern Virginia =

Field army of the Confederate States

- The battle flag of the Army of Northern Virginia, designed by William Porcher Miles
- Active: 1861–1865
- Disbanded: April 12, 1865
- Country: Confederate States
- Branch: Confederate States Army
- Size: Field army
- Wars: American Civil War; Eastern Theater

Commanders
- Commanding officers: P. G. T. Beauregard; Joseph E. Johnston; Gustavus W. Smith; Robert E. Lee

The Army of Northern Virginia was a field army of the Confederate States Army in the eastern theater of the American Civil War. It was also the primary command structure of the Department of Northern Virginia. It was most often arrayed against the Union's Army of the Potomac.

== History ==
=== Formation ===
The name Army of Northern Virginia referred to its primary area of operation, which was typical of most Confederate States Army names. The Army originated as the Army of the Potomac, which was organized on June 20, 1861, from all operational forces in Northern Virginia. On July 20 and July 21, the Army of the Shenandoah and forces from the District of Harpers Ferry were added. Units from the Army of the Northwest were merged into the Army of the Potomac between March 14 and May 17, 1862. The Army of the Potomac was renamed the Army of Northern Virginia on March 14. The Army of the Peninsula was merged into it on April 12, 1862.

Robert E. Lee's biographer, Douglas S. Freeman, asserts that the army received its final name from Lee when he issued orders assuming command on June 1, 1862. However, Freeman does admit that Lee corresponded with Joseph E. Johnston, his predecessor in army command, prior to that date and referred to Johnston's command as the Army of Northern Virginia. Part of the confusion results from the fact that Johnston commanded the Department of Northern Virginia (as of October 22, 1861) and the name Army of Northern Virginia can be seen as an informal consequence of its parent department's name. Jefferson Davis and Johnston did not adopt the name, but it is clear that the organization of units as of March 14 was the same organization that Lee received on June 1, and thus it is generally referred to today as the Army of Northern Virginia, even if that is correct only in retrospect.

In addition to Virginians, it included regiments from all over the Confederacy, some from as far away as Georgia, Texas, and Arkansas. One of the most well known was the Texas Brigade, made up of the 1st, 4th, and 5th Texas, and the 3rd Arkansas, which distinguished themselves in numerous battles, such as during their fight for the Devil's Den at the Battle of Gettysburg. Although West Virginia became a Union state in 1863, Virginia's western counties had contributed between 20,000 and 22,000 men. They greatly outnumbered their Union counterparts at Gettysburg, though the latter received four monuments from West Virginia. Missouri was also represented by a company of cavalry known as the 1st Missouri Cavalry, Co. A. They suffered heavy casualties at the Battle of New Market in 1864.

=== Beauregard's command ===
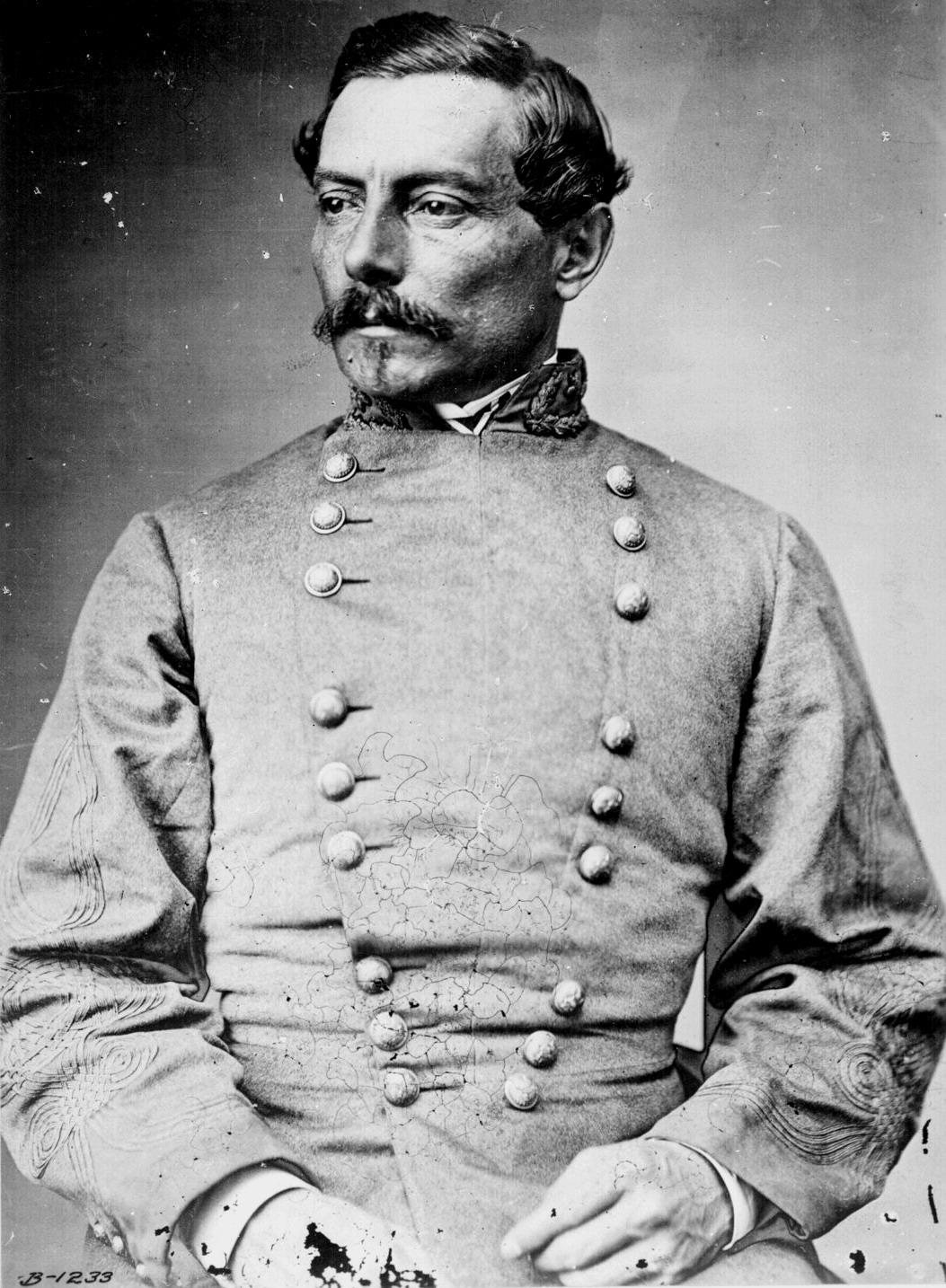
P. G. T. Beauregard

The first commander of the Army of Northern Virginia was General P. G. T. Beauregard, under its previous name, the Confederate Army of the Potomac, from June 20 to July 20, 1861. His forces consisted of six brigades, with various militia and artillery from the former Department of Alexandria. During his command, Beauregard is noted for creating the battle flag of the army, which came to be the primary battle flag for all corps and forces under the Army of Northern Virginia. The flag was designed due to confusion during battle between the Confederate Stars and Bars flag and the flag of the United States. Beauregard continued commanding these troops as the new First Corps under Gen. Joseph E. Johnston as it was joined by the Army of the Shenandoah on July 20, 1861, when command was relinquished to Johnston. The following day this army fought its first major engagement in the First Battle of Manassas.

=== Johnston's command ===
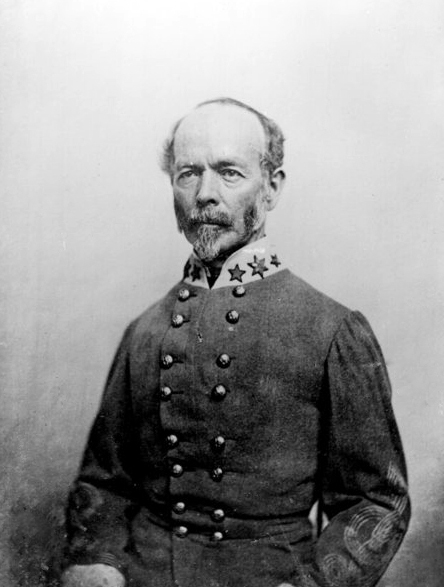
Joseph E. Johnston

With the merging of the Army of the Shenandoah, General Joseph E. Johnston took command from July 20, 1861, until May 31, 1862.

==== Corps organization under Johnston 1861 ====
- First Corps – commanded by General P. G. T. Beauregard
- Second Corps – commanded by Maj. Gen. Gustavus W. Smith

==== Wing organization under Johnston 1862 ====
- Left Wing – commanded by Maj. Gen. D. H. Hill
- Center Wing – commanded by Maj. Gen. James Longstreet
- Right Wing – commanded by Maj. Gen. John B. Magruder
- Reserve – commanded by Maj. Gen. Gustavus W. Smith

Under the command of Joseph E. Johnston, the Army immediately entered into the First Battle of Manassas. On October 22, 1861, the Department of Northern Virginia was officially created, officially ending the Army of the Potomac. The department comprised three districts: Aquia District, Potomac District, and the Valley District. In April 1862, the department was expanded to include the Departments of Norfolk and the Peninsula (of Virginia). Johnston was eventually forced into maneuvering the Army southward to the defenses of Richmond during the opening of the Peninsula Campaign, where it conducted delay and defend tactics until Johnston was severely wounded at the Battle of Seven Pines.

During the months after the First Battle of Bull Run, Johnston organized his Shenandoah Army and Beauregard's Potomac Army into two divisions under a unified command with Gustavus W. Smith and James Longstreet as division commanders. Beauregard quarreled with Johnston and was transferred to the western theater over the winter months. Stonewall Jackson was sent to the Shenandoah Valley in October 1861, initially with his own old Stonewall Brigade and later with two other brigades from Western Virginia. Several newly arrived brigades were added to Johnston's army in late 1861-early 1862.

When the Peninsula Campaign began, Johnston took his army down to the Richmond environs where it was merged with several smaller Confederate commands, including a division led by D.H. Hill as well as Benjamin Huger's Department of Norfolk, John Magruder's Army of the Peninsula, and miscellaneous brigades and regiments pulled from various Southern states. Richard Ewell was elevated to division command in the spring of 1862 and sent to join Jackson in the Valley.

On May 27, an additional new division was created and led by A.P. Hill consisting of several new brigades from the Carolinas, Georgia, and Virginia, soon augmented with James Archer's brigade from Smith's division. At Seven Pines, Longstreet and Smith served as temporary wing commanders, and operational control of their divisions went to Brig. Gen William H.C. Whiting and Brig. Gen Richard H. Anderson.

=== Smith's temporary command ===
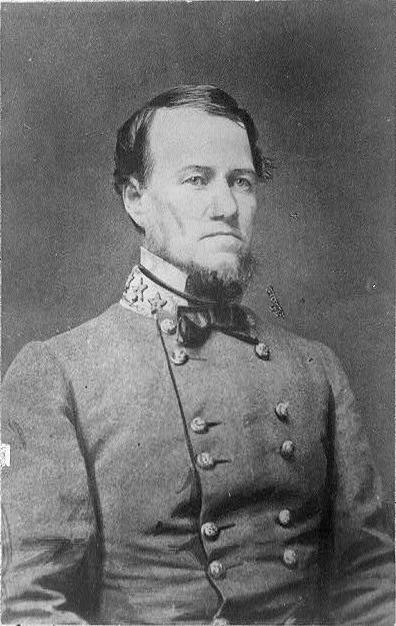
Gustavus W. Smith

Maj. Gen. Gustavus W. Smith commanded the Army of Northern Virginia on May 31, 1862, following the wounding of Gen. Joseph E. Johnston during the Battle of Seven Pines. With Smith seemingly having a nervous breakdown, President Jefferson Davis drafted orders to place Gen. Robert E. Lee in command the following day.

=== Lee's command ===
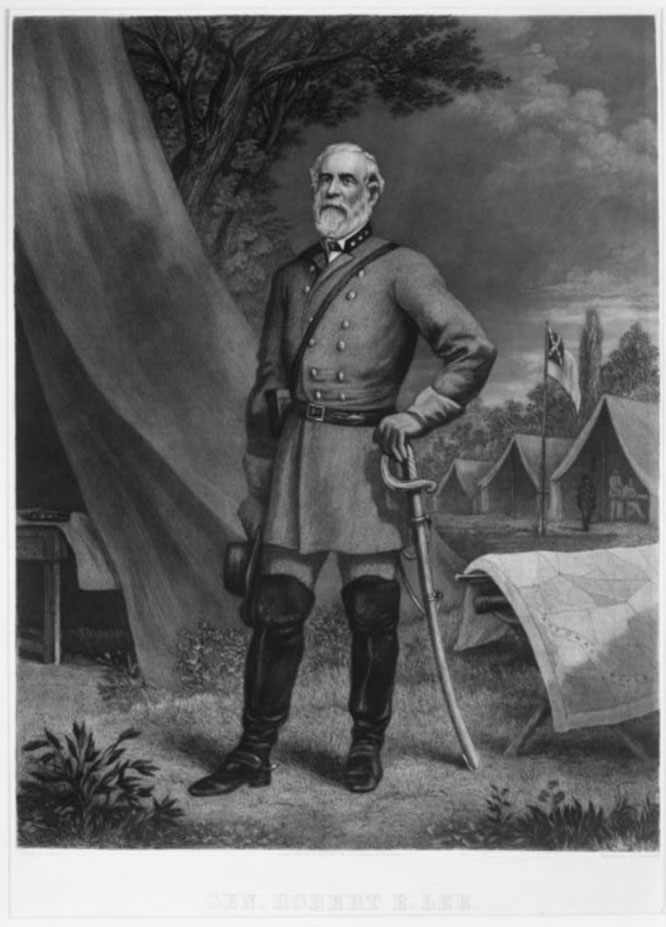
General Robert E. Lee, commander of the Army of Northern Virginia

On June 1, 1862, General Robert E. Lee, its final and best known leader historically, took command after Johnston was wounded and Smith suffered what may have been a nervous breakdown at the Battle of Seven Pines. William Whiting received permanent command of Smith's division, while Richard Anderson reverted to brigade command. Longstreet served as a wing commander for part of the Seven Days Battles and Anderson had operational command of the division at Glendale.

The cavalry, organized into a division on August 17, 1862, and into a corps on September 9, 1863, was commanded by Maj. Gen. J.E.B. Stuart until May 11, 1864 (the day he was mortally wounded). The cavalry corps was then temporarily split into divisions, but was merged again on August 11, 1864, under command of Lt. Gen. Wade Hampton III. The Reserve Artillery was commanded by Brig. Gen. William N. Pendleton for most of the war.

During the Seven Days Battles, Lee had eleven separate divisions under his command. Aside from the original core army that had been led by Johnston, there were assorted other commands from the Richmond area and North Carolina, as well as Jackson's Valley Army. The inexperience and poor coordination of the army led to the failure of Lee's plans to destroy the Army of the Potomac. As soon as the Seven Days Battles were over, Lee reorganized his army into two corps commanded by Jackson and Longstreet. He removed several generals who had turned in a less-than-inspiring performance in the Seven Days Battles, including John Magruder and Benjamin Huger.

Jackson had five divisions, the commands of A.P. Hill, Ewell, D.H. Hill, and Winder. Longstreet had six divisions commanded by Richard Anderson (formerly Benjamin Huger's division), Cadmus M. Wilcox, James L. Kemper (each commanding half of Longstreet's former division), John Bell Hood (formerly William Whiting's division), David Rumph Jones, and Lafayette McLaws. D.H. Hill's and McLaws's divisions were left behind in the Richmond area and did not participate in the Northern Virginia campaign. The army was also joined for the Northern Virginia and Maryland Campaigns by Nathan G. Evans's independent South Carolina brigade and a North Carolina brigade led by Brig. Gen Thomas Drayton.

Gen. Robert E. Lee headquarters flag (1862–1863)

During the Maryland campaign, D.H. Hill rejoined the main army along with Lafayette McLaws. Kemper's division was merged with the division of David R. Jones, a more senior, experienced officer, and Kemper reverted to brigade command. In addition, Robert Ransom commanded two brigades from the Department of North Carolina. At Antietam, Longstreet commanded the divisions of Anderson, McLaws, Jones, Hood, and Ransom while Jackson had the divisions of John R. Jones, Alexander Lawton, A.P. Hill, and D.H. Hill.

The Northern Virginia and Maryland Campaigns still showed numerous defects in the organization and leadership of the Army of Northern Virginia, particularly the high rate of straggling and desertion during the invasion of Maryland. Lee had fewer than 40,000 men on the field at Antietam, the smallest his army would be until the Appomattox Campaign.

During the Fredericksburg Campaign, Longstreet had the divisions of Anderson, Hood, McLaws, Ransom, and George Pickett, who had just returned to action after months of convalescence from a wound sustained at the Battle of Gaines's Mill. Jackson had the divisions of D.H. Hill, A.P. Hill, Jubal Early, and Elisha Paxton. Robert Ransom's division returned to North Carolina after Fredericksburg. D.H. Hill also departed after quarreling with Lee.

In the Chancellorsville Campaign, Longstreet was sent with Pickett and Hood to the Richmond area. His other two divisions remained with the main army; they were directly commanded by Lee during this time. Robert Rodes took over D.H. Hill's division. Jackson was mortally wounded during the Battle of Chancellorsville. Afterwards, Lee divided the army into three corps with three divisions each. Longstreet got the divisions of Pickett, McLaws, and Hood; A.P. Hill got the divisions of Harry Heth, William D. Pender, and Richard Anderson; and Richard Ewell (returning to action after almost a year of recovering from the loss of a leg at Second Bull Run) got the divisions of Robert Rodes, Jubal Early, and Edward "Allegheny" Johnson. A Fourth Corps, under Lt. Gen. Richard H. Anderson, was organized on October 19, 1864; on April 8, 1865, it was merged into the Second Corps. The commanders of the first three corps changed frequently in 1864 and 1865.

By the time of the Pennsylvania invasion, Lee had fixed the organizational defects that plagued the army during its early campaigns and the straggling problems of the Maryland Campaign did not repeat themselves.

After taking over command in mid-1862, Lee began preparing to lead the Army of Northern Virginia for the first time. However, his aggressiveness to attack the Union led to the loss of many troops especially at the Battle of Antietam, which ended up being a turning point in the war for the Union. After the costly victories during the Seven Days Battles and at Second Manassas in August 1862, Lee had now lost a total of 30,000 of his approximately 92,000 troops within three months of becoming the Confederate's top general. Lee then planned to take his troops north into Maryland to destroy a critical railroad bridge across the Susquehanna River at Harrisburg in a letter written to President Davis. Lee even questioned his own plan, as he wrote, "I am aware that the movement is attended with much risk, yet I do not consider success impossible..." In addition, historians question Lee's aggressiveness to move his army to Maryland. "There can be no sort of doubt that Lee underestimated the exhaustion of his army after Second Manassas. That is, in reality, the major criticism of the Maryland operation: he carried worn-out men across the Potomac." His men were also underarmed and underfed, so the journey to Maryland added to the overall exhaustion. Once Lee arrived in Maryland and was preparing for Antietam, he made another controversial decision. Against the advice from General Longstreet and Jackson, Lee split his troops into four parts to attack the Union from different fronts. Clearly outnumbered and opposed to Lee's plan, Longstreet stated, "General, I wish we could stand still and let the damned Yankees come to us!" As the fighting played out on September 17, 1862, known as the bloodiest single-day battle in American history, the battles at Dunker Church and Burnside's Bridge proved to be too much for Lee and his Confederate army. Luckily for Lee, the arrival of A.P. Hill's troops and the mixture of McClellan's and Burnside's sluggishness, saved Lee's Army of Northern Virginia and allowed them to barely hold off the Union in Maryland.

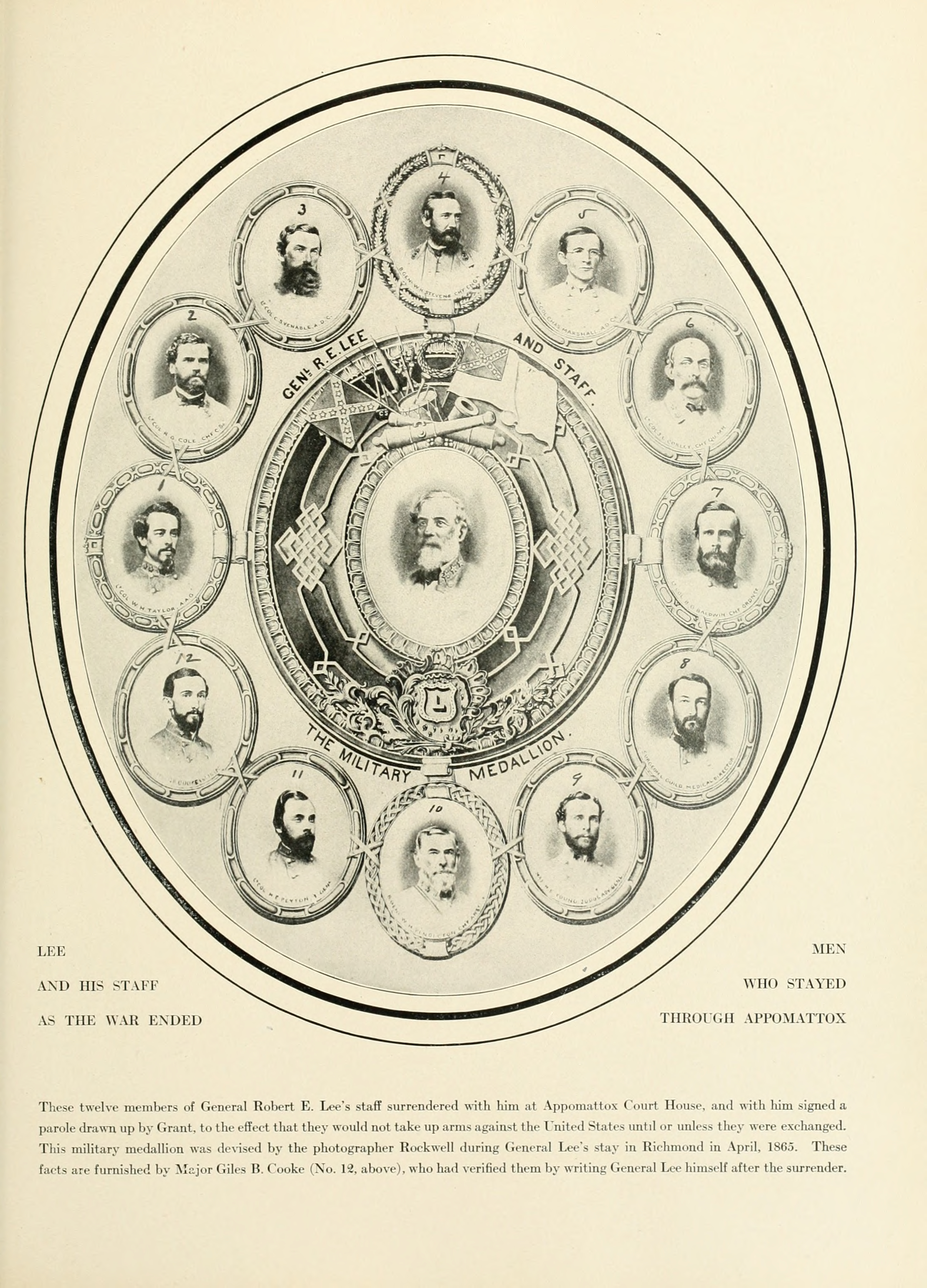
Montage of Robert E. Lee and his staff.

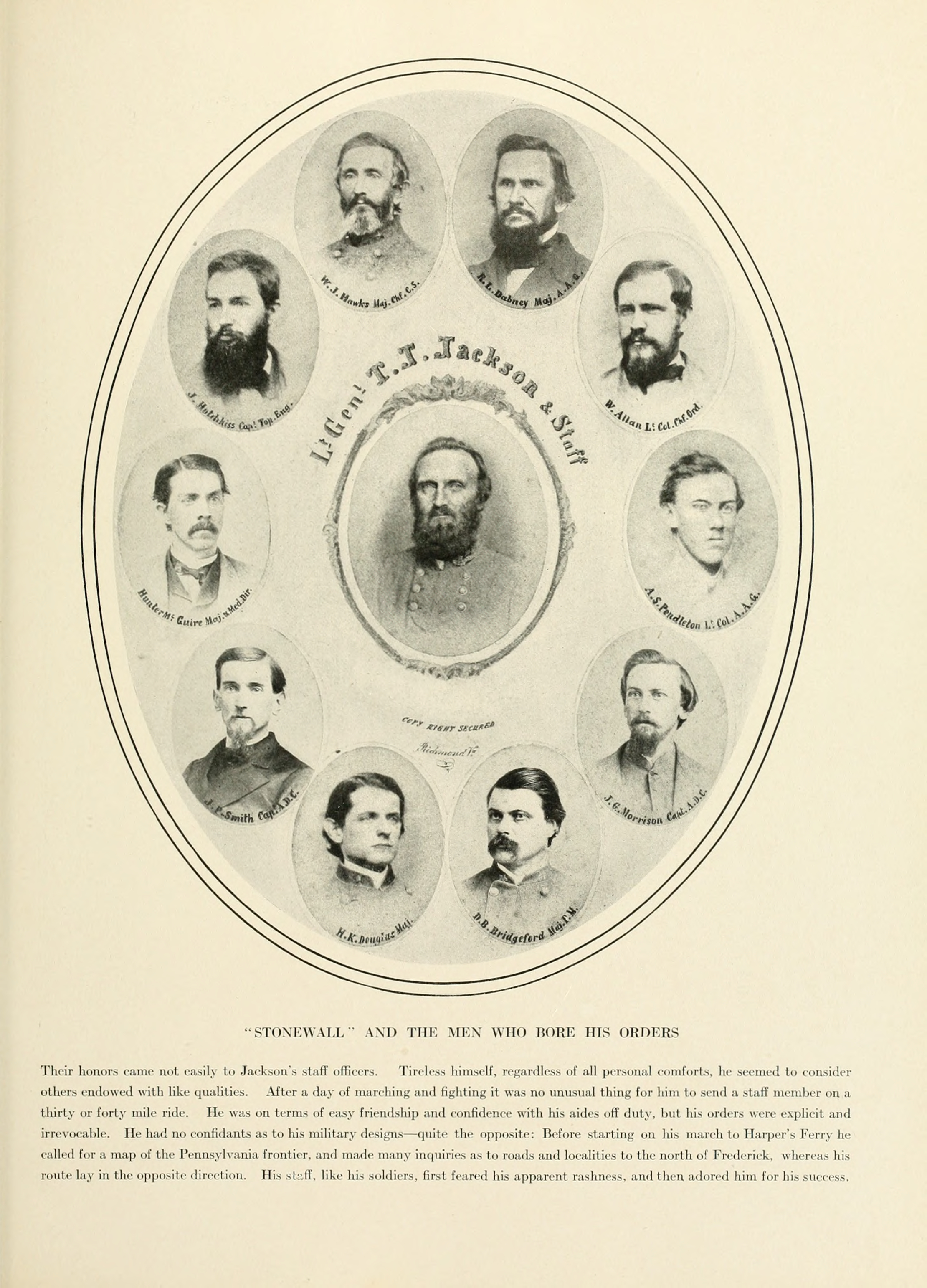
Montage of Thomas J. Jackson and staff.

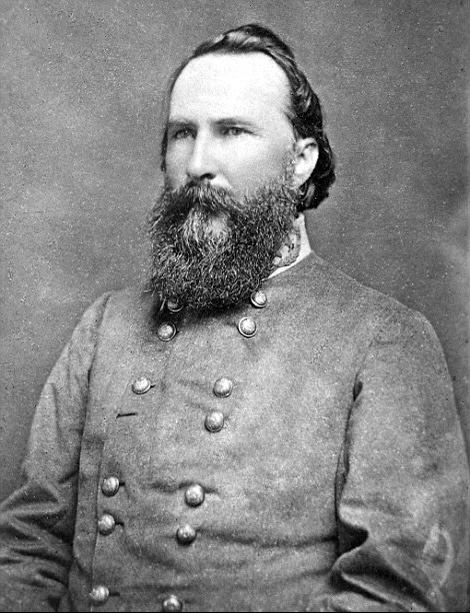
James Longstreet

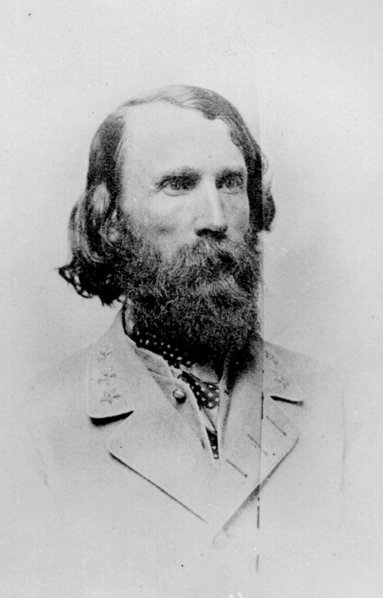
A. P. Hill

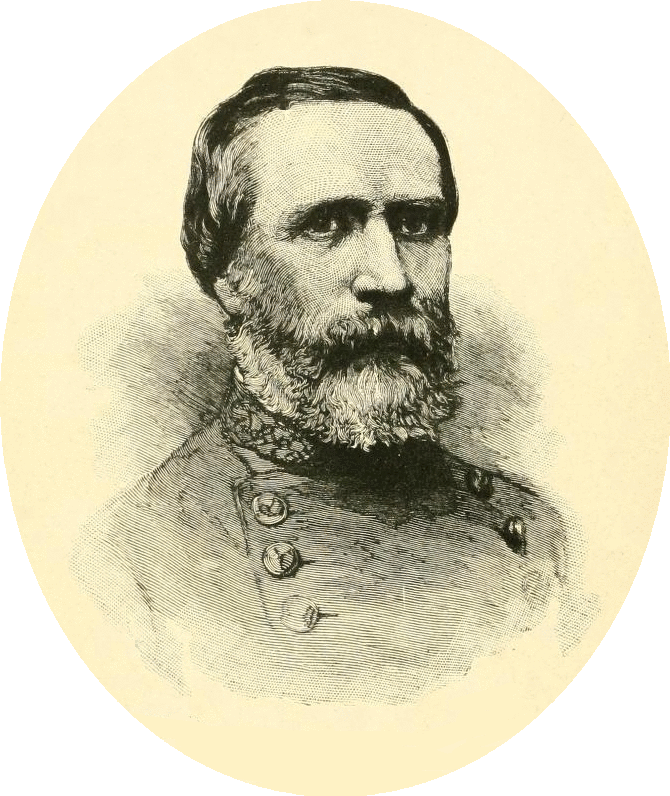
Richard H Anderson

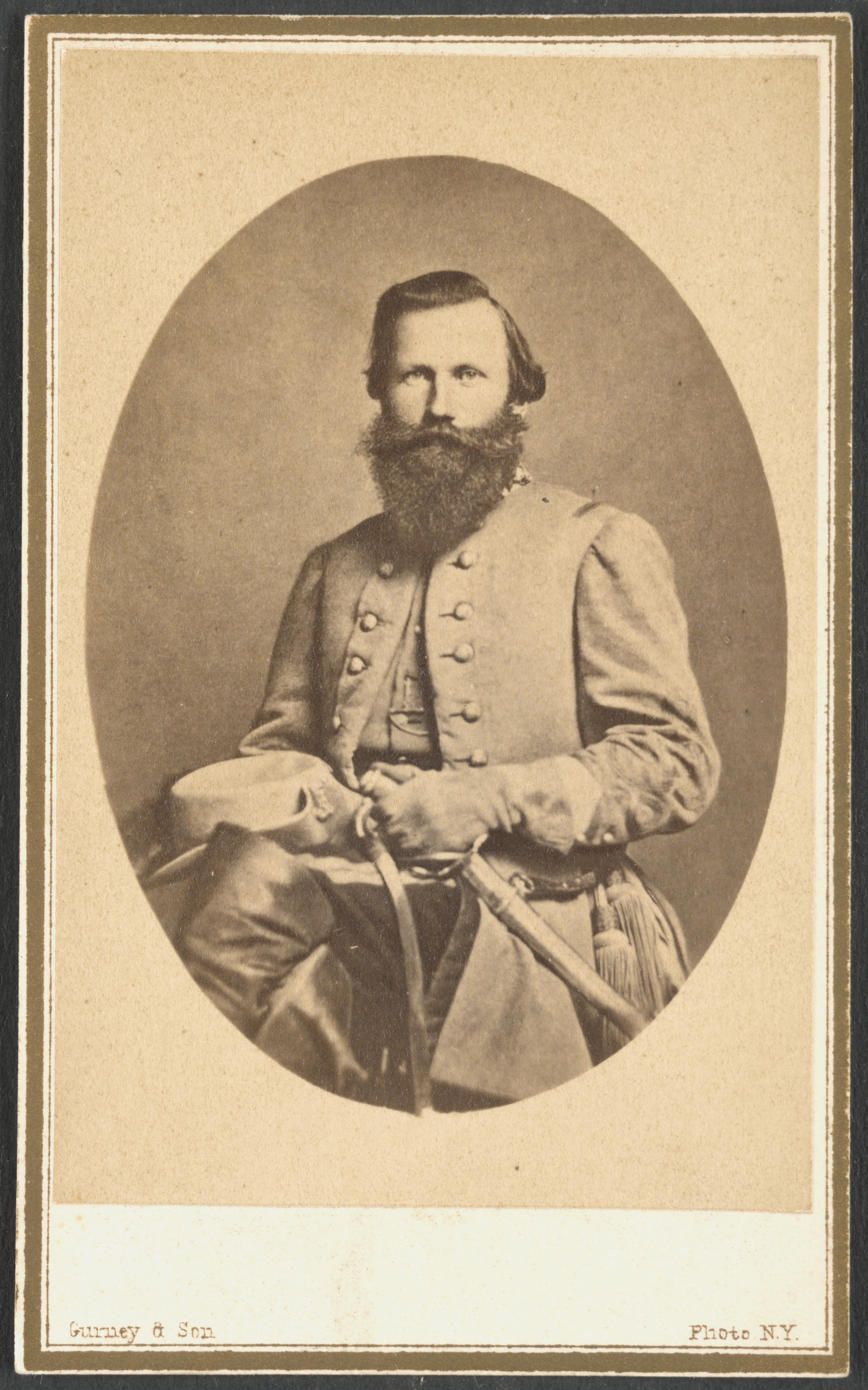
Maj. Gen. J.E.B. Stuart [Cavalry Corps]

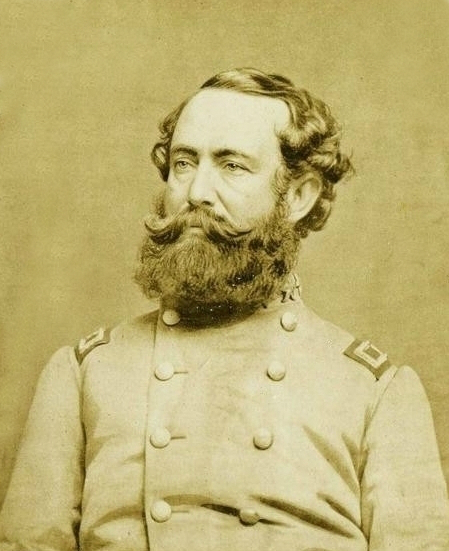
Wade Hampton [Cavalry Corps]

==== Corps organization under Lee ====
Although the Army of Northern Virginia swelled and shrank over time, its units of organization consisted primarily of corps, earlier referred to as "wings" or "commands":

- First Corps (Longstreet's Corps)
- Second Corps (Jackson's Corps in 1862/1863)
- Third Corps (A.P. Hill's Corps)
- Fourth Corps (Anderson's Corps)
- Cavalry Corps

== Campaigns and battles ==
The Army fought in a number of campaigns and battles, including:

Campaign	Year	Army strength at the beginning of campaign	Major battles
Peninsula Campaign	1862	55,633	Seven Pines (Fair Oaks)
Seven Days Battles	1862	approx. 92,000	Gaines' Mill, Malvern Hill
Northern Virginia Campaign	1862	approx. 54,000	Second Bull Run (Second Manassas)
Maryland Campaign	1862	approx. 60,000	Antietam (Sharpsburg)
Fredericksburg Campaign	1862	approx. 75,000	Fredericksburg
Chancellorsville Campaign	1863	approx. 75,000	Chancellorsville
Gettysburg campaign	1863	75,054	Gettysburg
Bristoe Campaign	1863	55,221	
Mine Run Campaign	1863	approx. 50,000	
Overland Campaign	1864	62,230	Wilderness, Spotsylvania Court House, Cold Harbor
Richmond–Petersburg Campaign	1864–1865	82,633	Siege of Petersburg, including the Battle of the Crater
Appomattox Campaign (surrendered)	1865	around 50,000	Five Forks, Battle of Appomattox Court House

On April 9, 1865, the Army of Northern Virginia surrendered to the Army of the Potomac at Appomattox Court House, effectively ending the Civil War, with General Lee signing the papers of surrender to General Ulysses S. Grant. The day after his surrender, Lee issued his Farewell Address to the Army of Northern Virginia.

== Organization of the Army ==
=== Department of Northern Virginia, October 22, 1861 ===
The Army of Northern Virginia's silk battle flag from November 1861

The Military Department of Northern Virginia was embattled on October 22, 1861. The department initially consisted of three districts under the overall command of General Joseph E. Johnston.

Defence district	Division	Brigade	Commander/Officers in charge
Potomac			General P. G. T. Beauregard
	1. Division		Major General Earl Van Dorn
	2. Division		Major General Gustavus W. Smith
	3. Division		Major General James Longstreet
	4. Division		Major General E. Kirby Smith
Aquia			Major General Theophilus H. Holmes
		French's Brigade	Brigadier General Samuel Gibbs French
		2. Brigade	Brigadier General John G. Walker
Valley			Major General Thomas J. Jackson
		Garnett's Brigade	Brigadier General Richard B. Garnett
		Ashby's Cavalry	Colonel Turner Ashby

On February 28, 1862, there were 47,617 soldiers present for duty to the military district. The Cavalry Brigade was provided from the Potomac's Military District and under direct control from the Defense District. The artillery formed an Artillery Corps with 109 cannons.

=== Organization April 30, 1862 ===
The Army of Northern Virginia's wool battle flag from 1862

The Army of Northern Virginia was established on March 14, 1862, again under Johnston. Though the military department stayed existent its role changed into an administrative division for most of the war.

Wing of the Army	Division	Brigade	Commander/Officers in charge
Left wing			Major General John B. Magruder
	McLaws' Division		Brigade General Lafayette McLaws
	Toombs' Division		Brigadier General Robert A. Toombs
		Ewell's Brigade	Colonel B. S. Ewell
Center			Major General James Longstreet
		A.P. Hill's Brigade	Brigadier General Ambrose P. Hill
		Anderson's Brigade	Brigadier General Richard H. Anderson
		Colston's Brigade	Brigadier General Raleigh E. Colston
		Pickett's Brigade	Brigadier General George E. Pickett
		Wilcox's Brigade	Brigadier General Cadmus M. Wilcox
		Pryor's Brigade	Colonel G. A. Winston
Left Emplacement			Major General Daniel H. Hill
	Early's Division		Brigadier General Jubal A. Early
		Early's Brigade	Brigadier General Jubal A. Early
		Rodes' Brigade	Brigadier General Robert E. Rodes
	Rains' Division		Brigadier General Gabriel J. Rains
		Rains' Brigade	Brigadier General Gabriel J. Rains
		Featherston's Brigade	Brigadier General Winfield S. Featherston
		Gloucester Point	Colonel Crump
Reserve			Major General Gustavus W. Smith
		Whiting's Brigade	Brigadier General W. H. C. Whiting
		Hood's Brigade	Brigadier General John B. Hood
		Colston's Brigade	Brigadier General Raleigh E. Colston
		Hampton's Brigade	Colonel Wade Hampton
		Anderson's Brigade	Brigadier General Samuel R. Anderson
		Pettigrew's Brigade	Brigadier General James J. Pettigrew
		Cavalry Brigade	Brigadier General J. E. B. Stuart

At the outset of the Peninsula Campaign the Army of Northern Virginia had more than 55,633 soldiers. The cannon was assigned to the brigades, as well as the Reserve's artillery. Nominally, Jackson's Corps in the Shenandoah Valley, was subordinate to the Army. Since Jackson led his own campaign at the time of the Peninsula Campaign and was not under Lee's direct command this overview does not include his three divisions.

The Army's organization soon proved inept in the course of the Peninsula Campaign. The corps-like structure was rearranged before the Seven Days Battle to converge with the requirements of actual command. In the course of this battle the Army featured two Corps; Jackson's and Magruder's, with four and three divisions respectively, and three actual divisions with five to six brigades. Also the Defense District of North Carolina answered directly to the Army as well as the Reserve Artillery with six battalions and the cavalry with six regiments. The army's complete strength was about 90,000 soldiers. The exact strength cannot be determined, because only a few notes for actual provisionings survived. The estimated strength results, if not explicitly noted, from in-battle dispatches.

=== Organization at the setout of the Northern Virginia Campaign ===
The Seven Days Battle showed the Army still suffered from insufficient organization in army command. General Lee subdivided the army again, but this time only with single commands. He introduced a corps-like structure of command, and as an intermediate army management he named the left and right wing. The Army was organized on August 28, 1862, as follows.

Wing of the Army/Army troops	Division	Brigade/Combat support	Commander/Officers in charge
Right Wing		3 Artillery Battalions	Major General James Longstreet
	Anderson's Division	3 Brigades	Major General Richard H. Anderson
	Jones's Division	3 Brigades	Brigadier General David Rumph Jones
	Wilcox's Division	3 Brigades / 2 Artillery Batteries	Brigadier General Cadmus M. Wilcox
	Hood's Division	2 Brigades / 1 Artillery Battalion	Brigadier General John B. Hood
	Kemper's Division	3 Brigades	Brigadier General James L. Kemper
		Evan's Brigade / 1 Artillery Battery	Brigadier General Nathan George Evans
Left Wing			Major General Thomas J. Jackson
	Jackson's Division	4 Brigades / 1 Artillery Regiment	Brigadier General William B. Taliaferro
	Hill's Light Division	6 Brigades / 1 Artillery Regiment	Major General Ambrose P. Hill
	Ewell's Division	4 Brigades / 1 Artillery Regiment	Major General Richard S. Ewell
Cavalry Division		3 Brigades / 1 Artillery Battery	Major General J. E. B. Stuart

The Army's Reserve Artillery consisted of one regiment and two battalions. They stayed in the area of Richmond in the course of the whole Northern Virginia Campaign and only returned on September 3, 1862, to the Army. Major General Hill's Division also remained in the eastern parts of Richmond with the order to bind McClellan's attention as long as possible. As it became predictable that the Army of the Potomac would soon be transferred to support Pope, Lee ordered the Division north. Hill never entered battle in the campaign. A total of about 54,000 soldiers saw action throughout the campaign.

=== Organization at the beginning of the Maryland Campaign ===
The Army's losses before and following the Battle of Second Manassas needed to be replaced before the Maryland Campaign could commence. While fundamental changes in the Army's command structure were not necessary, General Lee exchanged divisions and brigades or added additional strength to some. The wings of the Army were now officially called 'Corps'. In the Maryland Campaign the Army was subdivided as follows.

Corps / Army group	Division	Brigade/Combat support	Commander/Officers in charge
Longstreet's Corps		2 Artillery Battalions	Major General James Longstreet
	Anderson's Division	6 Brigades / 1 Artillery Battalion	Major General Richard H. Anderson
	Jones's Division	6 Brigades / 4 Artillery Batteries	Brigadier General David Rumph Jones
	McLaws's Division	4 Brigades / 1 Artillery Battalion	Major General Lafayette McLaws
	Hood's Division	2 Brigades / 1 Artillery Battalion	Brigadier General John B. Hood
	Walker's Division	2 Brigades / 2 Batteries	Brigadier General John G. Walker
		Evans's Brigade / 1 Artillery Battery	Brigadier General Nathan George Evans
Jackson's Corps			Major General Thomas J. Jackson
	Jackson's Division	4 Brigades / 1 Artillery Regiment	Brigadier General John R. Jones
	Hill's Light Division	6 Brigades / 1 Artillery Regiment	Major General Ambrose P. Hill
	Hill's Division	5 Brigades / 1 Artillery Battalion	Major General Daniel H. Hill
	Ewell's Division	4 Brigades / 1 Artillery Regiment	Brigadier General Alexander R. Lawton
Cavalry Division		3 Brigades / 3 Artillery Batteries	Major General J. E. B. Stuart
Reserve Artillery		4 Battalions / 5 Batteries	Brigadier General William N. Pendleton

Organization of the Army of Northern Virginia at the time of the Battle of Fredericksburg in December 1862

While organization of the corps was found to be generally reliable, the corps' subdivision into four or five divisions hampered overall ease of command. General Lee had already considered before the Battle of Antietam to slim down the overall structure, but intended there be no changes in leadership. The Confederate Congress authorized the establishment of the Corps, and President Davis affirmed the assignment of the commanders and promoted Major Generals Longstreet and Jackson to Lieutenant Generals. General Lee announced this in Special Order 234 on November 6, 1862. About 60,000 soldiers served at the Maryland Campaign.

=== Fredericksburg and Chancellorsville ===
In the days following the Battle of Chancellorsville there were no changes in the army's command structure or hierarchy. The army replaced its own losses with new recruits and soldiers returning to duty. Lee made demands that all regiments had to be consolidated solely with recruits originating from their corresponding home states.

Following the Battle of Fredericksburg the Army of Northern Virginia could muster over 72,497 soldiers not counting other personnel. Not figuring into this overall number is the fact that Lee had made the decision to station a whole division and a single cavalry brigade at Shenandoah Valley for protection at this time and these troops are missing from the total estimates.

During the autumn of 1862 lasting throughout the following winter the army faced the Army of the Potomac at Rappahannock. Thereout arose a new problem: Because of the necessity to always show its presence to the enemy there were only limited supplies available for the army from the surrounding villages and towns. Any army at these times supplied itself along the way while moving across the theater of war. Even ordering supplies through the use of the rail, if it was an available option at all, took up considerable time and efforts and supply treks by wagons were potentially prone to enemy assaults. This left Lee with few options and therefore he gave the special order on December 24, 1862, to move half of his artillery into the hinterlands to have his horses better supplied. He forbade to assign all of the horses to any other task than official assignments.

On February 15, 1863, Lee rearranged his artillery. Six battalions were assigned to both corps, and the reserve was composed out of two more battalions. The Confederate War Department strongly suggested in position papers to Lee dating from the February 18th, 1862 to station two divisions at the Atlantic coast. Lee was not averse to any such demands, probably very much on the contrary, because of the tight position he was in with the general lack of provisions, so he gave orders to General Longstreet to have it done so. Both of the assigned divisions only returned to join the Army of Northern Virginia again following the Battle of Chancellorsville. The army was composed at this battle out of over 61.500 soldiers.

=== Organization from May 30, 1863, until April 9, 1865 ===
Lee took Jackson's death as an opportunity to subdivide the North Virginia Corps again. President Jefferson Davis agreed to the subdivision and ordered Lee in his Special Order Nr. 146 to reorganize the Army.

Corps/Army group	Division	Brigade/Combat support	Commander/Officers in charge
I Corps			Lieutenant General James Longstreet
	Pickett's Division	5 Brigades / 1 Artillery Battalion	Major General George E. Pickett
	McLaws's Division	4 Brigades / 1 Artillery Battalion	Major General Lafayette McLaws
	Hood's Division	4 Brigades / 1 Artillery Battalion	Major General John B. Hood
II Corps			Lieutenant General Richard S. Ewell
	Early's Division	4 Brigades / 1 Artillery Battalion	Major General Jubal A. Early
	Johnson's Division	4 Brigades / 1 Artillery Battalion	Major General Edward Johnson
	Rodes's Division	5 Brigades / 1 Artillery Battalion	Major General Robert E. Rodes
III Corps			Lieutenant General A.P. Hill
	Anderson's Division	5 Brigades / 1 Artillery Battalion	Major General Richard H. Anderson
	Heth's Division	4 Brigades / 1 Artillery Battalion	Major General Henry Heth
	Pender's Division	4 Brigades / 1 Artillery Battalion	Major General W. Dorsey Pender
Cavalry Division		6 Brigades / 1 Artillery Battalion	Major General J. E. B. Stuart
Reserve Artillery		6 Battalions	Brig. General William N. Pendleton
Imboden's Command		gem. Brigade / 1 Artillery Battery	Brigadier General John D. Imboden

Lee ordered the artillery battalions of the Reserve Artillery to serve directly with the Corps for the duration of the Gettysburg campaign. The Army of Northern Virginia now comprised a total of 75,054 soldiers at the Battle of Gettysburg.

The army fielded more than 241 cannons following the Battle of Gettysburg.

On September 9, General Lee had to dispatch the First Corps to Braxton Bragg's Army of Tennessee. Following this the army was resubordinated again. Changes were not significant; only the cavalry saw important reorganization.

Corps / Army group	Division	Brigade/Combat support	Commander/Officers in charge
II Corps		5 Artillery Battalions	Lieutenant General Richard S. Ewell
	Early's Division	4 Brigades	Major General Jubal A. Early
	Johnson's Division	4 Brigades	Major General Edward Johnson
	Rodes's Division	5 Brigades	Major General Robert E. Rodes
III Corps		5 Artillery Battalions	Lieutenant General A.P. Hill
	Anderson's Division	5 Brigades	Major General Richard H. Anderson
	Heth's Division	4 Brigades	Major General Henry Heth
	Wilcox's Division	4 Brigades	Major General Cadmus M. Wilcox
Cavalry Corps		1 Artillery Battalion	Major General J. E. B. Stuart
	Hampton's Division	2 Brigades	Major General Wade Hampton
	Lee's Division	3 Brigades	Major General Fitzhugh Lee
Reserve Artillery		2 Battalions	Major General William N. Pendleton
Defense District of Shenandoah Valley		gem. Brigade / 1 Artillery Battery	Brigadier General John D. Imboden
Cooke's Brigade			Brigadier General John R. Cooke

The Army's strength was then 55,221 soldiers. The changes in command until December 31, 1863, were only minor. Cooke's Brigade was assigned to serve with Heth's Division, Hampton's Division grew by a cavalry brigade and the Third Corps gained an additional artillery battalion. Imboden's Command remained at Shenandoah Valley and was taken over by Major General Early as the Defense District of Shenandoah Valley. The strength of the army was 54,715 men on December 31.

The organization of the Army of Northern Virginia did not change until the end of the war. The Army featured several corps, the corps featured several divisions, and the artillery was divided between the corps. The strength of the Army grew in the first six months from about 46,380 to 62,230 soldiers. The army was assigned in July to the Defense District of North Carolina and Richmond. In the course of the Richmond-Petersburg Campaign the number of soldiers temporarily grew to 82,633 while parts of the Army were under the command by Lieutenant General Early in Shenandoah Valley.

Organization of the Army of Northern Virginia at the time of the Battle of the Wilderness, fought between May 5 and May 7, 1864)

In 1864, the Army of Northern Virginia fought forces over twice as strong as that of the Potomac, James and Shenandoah Army in Grant's Overland Campaign, Early's Raid against the Baltimore and Ohio Railroad, the Richmond-Petersburg Campaign, and Shenandoah Campaign in the Shenandoah Valley. The Army reorganized on January 31, 1865 because 69,659 soldiers were fit for battle, but 4,500 or more had no rifles.

Corps / Army group	Division	Brigade/Combat support	Commander/Officers in charge
I Corps		6 Artillery Battalions	Lieutenant General James Longstreet
	Pickett's Division	4 Brigades	Major General George E. Pickett
	Field's Division	5 Brigades	Major General Charles W. Field
	Kershaw's Division	4 Brigades	Major General Joseph B. Kershaw
II Corps		4 Artillery Battalions	Major General John B. Gordon
	Early's Division	3 Brigades	Brigadier General John Pegram
	Gordon's Division	3 Brigades	Brigadier General Clement A. Evans
	Rodes's Division	4 Brigades	Brigadier General Bryan Grimes
III Corps		7 Artillery Battalions	Lieutenant General A.P. Hill
	Mahone's Division	5 Brigades	Major General William Mahone
	Heth's Division	4 Brigades	Major General Henry Heth
	Wilcox's Division	4 Brigades	Major General Cadmus M. Wilcox
Anderson's Corps		4 Artillery Battalions	Lieutenant General Richard H. Anderson
	Johnson's Division	4 Brigades	Major General Bushrod Rust Johnson
Defense District of Shenandoah Valley		6 Artillery Battalions	Lieutenant General Jubal A. Early
	Wharton's Division	3 Infantry / 1 Cavalry Brigades	Brigadier General John A. Wharton
Cavalry Corps		3 Artillery Battalions	Major General Wade Hampton
	Lee's Division	3 Brig	Major general William H. F. Lee

== Surrender and parole ==
Following Lieutenant General A.P. Hill's death on April 2, 1865, the Third Corps was dissolved and assigned to the First Corps. On April 9, 1865, General Lee surrendered. One day later he thanked his men and his officers for their bravery and sturdiness and announced the dismissal of all troops on their word of honor in General Order No. 9. The listings of the Army of Northern Virginia say that 28,231 soldiers were dismissed on their word of honor on April 10, 1865.
