= Lee's Farewell Address =

1865 letter by Confederate Gen. Robert E. Lee to his troops

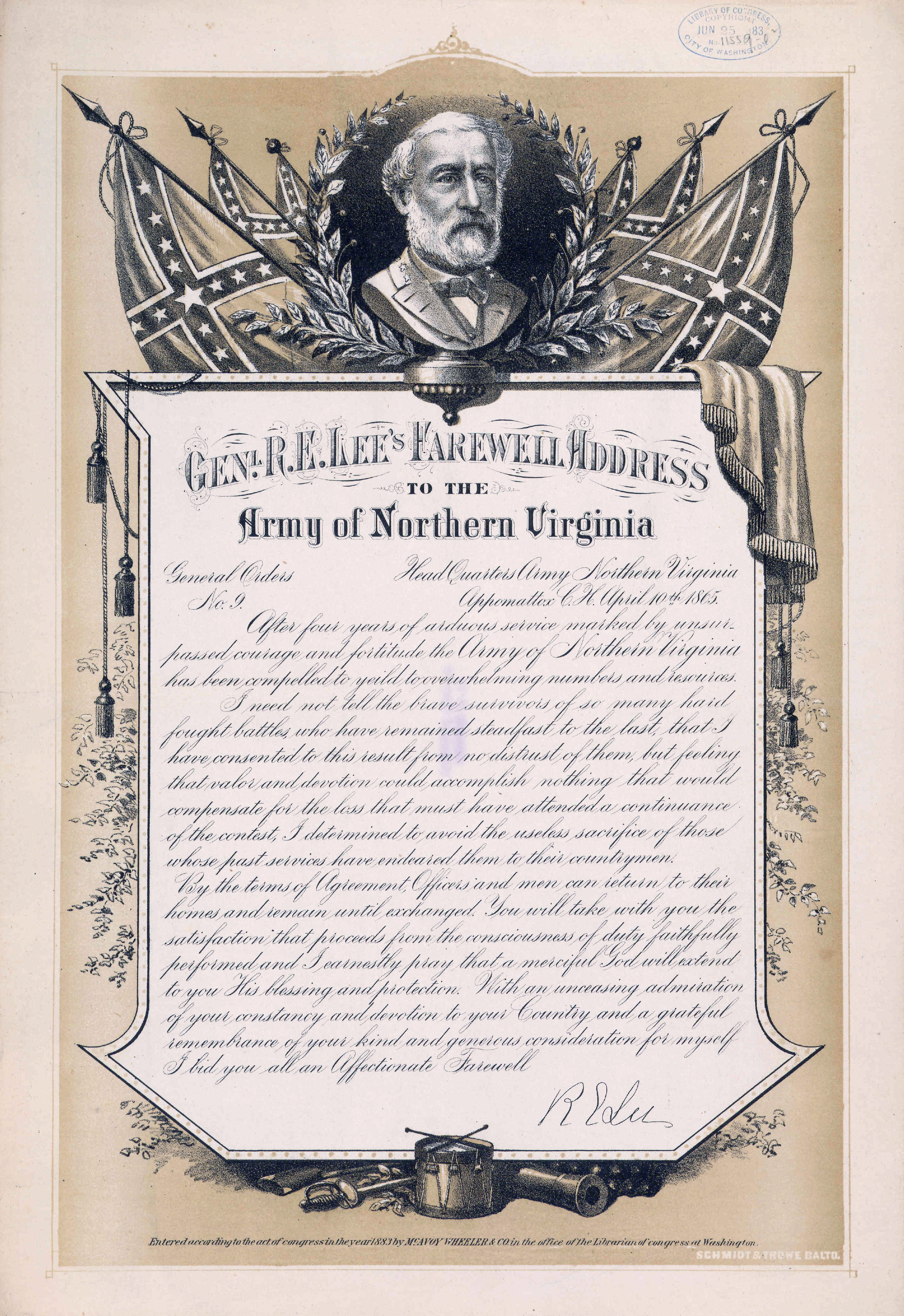
The Farewell Address of Confederate Army General Robert E. Lee, to the Army of Northern Virginia on April 10, 1865, known as General Order No. 9., from an 1883 Library of Congress reprint

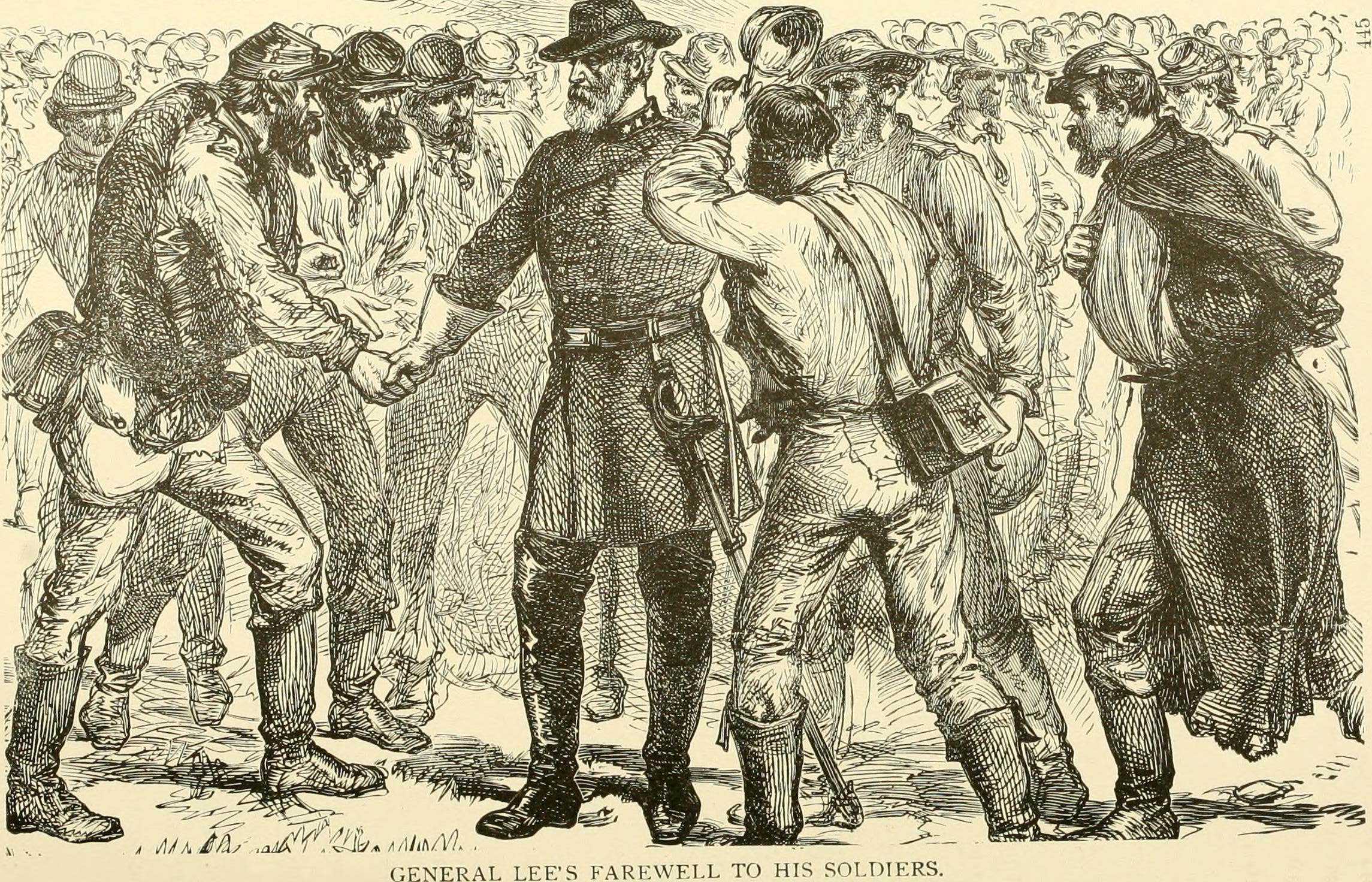
Lee's April 10, 1865 farewell to his Confederate Army soldiers

Confederate General Robert E. Lee issued his Farewell Address, also known as General Order No. 9, to his Army of Northern Virginia on April 10, 1865, the day after he surrendered to Union Army Lieutenant General Ulysses S. Grant. Lee's surrender was instrumental in bringing about the end of the American Civil War. The text of the order, which was written and drafted by Col. Charles Marshall and edited and finalized by Lee, read as follows:

Headquarters, Army of Northern Virginia, 10th April 1865.

General Order

No. 9

After four years of arduous service marked by unsurpassed courage and fortitude, the Army of Northern Virginia has been compelled to yield to overwhelming numbers and resources.

I need not tell the survivors of so many hard fought battles, who have remained steadfast to the last, that I have consented to the result from no distrust of them.

But feeling that valour and devotion could accomplish nothing that could compensate for the loss that must have attended the continuance of the contest, I have determined to avoid the useless sacrifice of those whose past services have endeared them to their countrymen.

By the terms of the agreement, officers and men can return to their homes and remain until exchanged. You will take with you the satisfaction that proceeds from the consciousness of duty faithfully performed, and I earnestly pray that a merciful God will extend to you his blessing and protection.

With an unceasing admiration of your constancy and devotion to your Country, and a grateful remembrance of your kind and generous consideration for myself, I bid you an affectionate farewell.

— R. E. Lee, General, General Order No. 9

The following is taken from a letter dated September 27, 1887, to General Bradley T. Johnson from Colonel Charles Marshall, CSA.

General Lee's order to the Army of Northern Virginia at Appomattox Court House was written the day after the meeting at McLean's house, at which the terms of the surrender were agreed upon. That night the general sat with several of us at a fire in front of his tent, and after some conversation about the army, and the events of the day, in which his feelings toward his men were strongly expressed, he told me to prepare an order to the troops.

The next day it was raining, and many persons were coming and going, so that I was unable to write without interruption until about 10 o'clock, when General Lee, finding that the order had not been prepared, directed me to get into his ambulance, which stood near his tent, and placed an orderly to prevent any one from approaching me.

I sat in the ambulance until I had written the order, the first draft of which (in pencil) contained an entire paragraph that was omitted by General Lee's direction. He made one or two verbal changes, and I then made a copy of the order as corrected, and gave it to one of the clerks in the adjutant-general's office to write in ink. I took the copy, when made by the clerk, to the general, who signed it, and other copies were then made for transmission to the corps commanders and the staff of the army. All these copies were signed by the general, and a good many persons sent other copies which they had made or procured, and obtained his signature. In this way many copies of the order had the general's name signed as if they were originals, some of which I have seen.

== See also ==
- Battle of Appomattox Court House
- McLean House (Appomattox, Virginia)
