= Battle of Appomattox Court House =

Crucial battle at the conclusion of the American Civil War

- Part of the Appomattox campaign
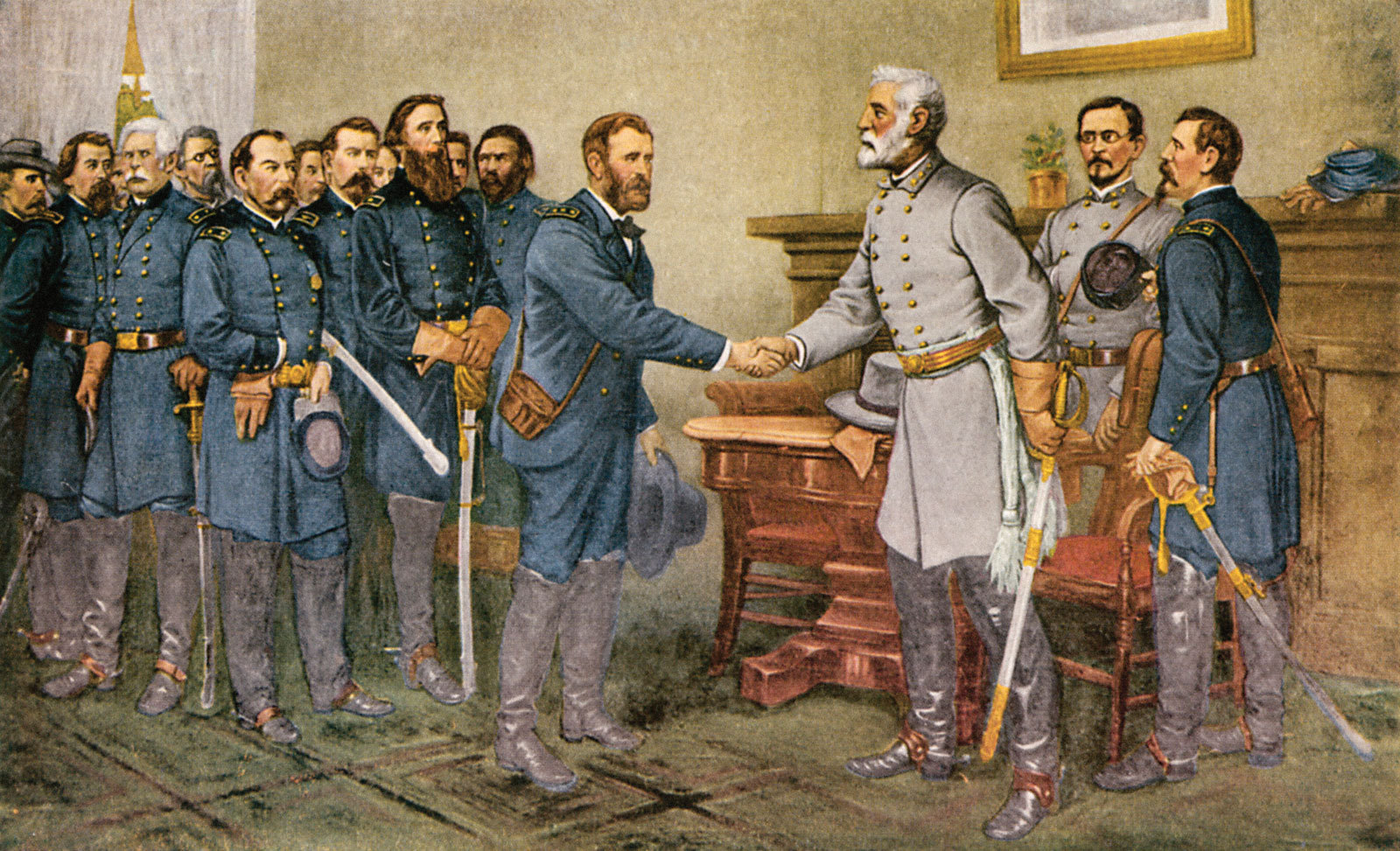
- A print depicting Ulysses S. Grant, Commanding General of the Union Army, accepting Confederate General in Chief Robert E. Lee's surrender on April 9, 1865
Date	April 9, 1865; 161 years ago
Location	Appomattox Court House, Appomattox County, Virginia 37°22′39″N 78°47′46″W
Result	Union victory

Belligerents
United States	Confederate States

Commanders and leaders
Ulysses S. Grant; George G. Meade; Philip Sheridan; Edward O.C. Ord	Robert E. Lee (surrendered); Henry L. Benning (surrendered); John B. Gordon (surrendered); James Longstreet (surrendered)

Units involved
Army of the Potomac; Army of the Shenandoah; Army of the James	Army of Northern Virginia (surrendered)

Strength
63,285	26,000

Casualties and losses
164 killed or wounded	195 killed 305 wounded 28,356 surrendered and paroled

The Battle of Appomattox Court House, fought in Appomattox County, Virginia, on the morning of April 9, 1865, was one of the last, and ultimately one of the most consequential, battles of the American Civil War (1861–1865). It was the final push of Confederate general in chief Robert E. Lee and his Army of Northern Virginia before they surrendered to the Union Army of the Potomac under the Commanding General of the United States Army, Ulysses S. Grant.

Lee, having abandoned the Confederate capital of Richmond, Virginia, after the nine-and-a-half-month siege of Petersburg and Richmond, retreated west, hoping to join his army with Confederate forces, the Army of Tennessee in North Carolina. Union infantry and cavalry forces under General Philip Sheridan pursued and cut off the Confederates' retreat just southwest of the small central Virginia village of Appomattox Court House. Lee launched a last-ditch attack to break through the Union forces to his front, assuming the Union force consisted entirely of lightly armed cavalry. When he realized that the cavalry was now backed up by two corps of federal infantry, he had no choice but to surrender with his further avenue of retreat and escape now cut off.

The signing of the surrender documents occurred in the parlor of the house owned by Wilmer McLean on the afternoon of April 9. On April 12, a formal ceremony of parade and the stacking of arms led by Confederate Major General John B. Gordon to Union Brigadier General Joshua Chamberlain marked the disbandment of the Army of Northern Virginia with the parole of its nearly 28,000 remaining officers and men, free to return home without their major weapons but enabling men to take their horses and officers to retain their sidearms, and effectively ending the war in Virginia.

This event signaled the end of the four-year-long war. It triggered a series of subsequent surrenders across the South, in North Carolina, Alabama and finally Shreveport, Louisiana, for the trans-Mississippi theater in the West by June.

== Military situation ==
The final campaign for Richmond, Virginia, the capital of the Confederate States, began when the Union Army of the Potomac crossed the James River in June 1864. The armies under the command of Lieutenant General and General-in-Chief Ulysses S. Grant (1822–1885) laid siege to Petersburg, south of Richmond, intending to cut the two cities' supply lines and force the Confederates to evacuate. In the spring of 1865, Confederate States Army General Robert E. Lee (1807–1870), waited for an opportunity to leave the Petersburg lines, aware that the position was untenable, but Union troops made the first move. On April 1, 1865, Major General Philip Sheridan's cavalry turned Lee's flank at the Battle of Five Forks. The next day Grant's army achieved a decisive breakthrough, effectively ending the Petersburg siege. With supply railroad lines cut, Lee's men abandoned the trenches they had held for ten months and evacuated on the night of April 2–3.

Lee's first objective was to reassemble and supply his men at Amelia Courthouse. His plan was to link up with General Joseph E. Johnston's Army of Tennessee in North Carolina and go on the offensive after establishing defenses on the Roanoke River in southwest Virginia. When the troops arrived at Amelia on April 4, however, they found no provisions. Lee sent wagons out to the surrounding country to forage, but as a result lost a day's worth of marching time. The army then headed west to Appomattox Station, where another supply train awaited him. Lee's army was now composed of the cavalry corps and two small infantry corps.

En route to the station, on April 6 at Sailor's Creek, nearly one fourth of the retreating Confederate army was cut off by Sheridan's cavalry and elements of the II and VI Corps. Two Confederate divisions fought the VI Corps along the creek. The Confederates attacked but were driven back, and soon after the Union cavalry cut through the right of the Confederate lines. Most of the 7,700 Confederates were captured or surrendered, including Lieutenant General Richard S. Ewell and eight other general officers. The delay prevented Lee from reaching the Appomattox Station until late afternoon on April 8, allowing Sheridan to reach the station ahead of the Southerners that evening, where he captured Lee's supplies and obstructed his path.

Following the minor battles of Cumberland Church and High Bridge, on April 7, General Grant sent a note to Lee suggesting that it was time to surrender the Army of Northern Virginia. In a return note, Lee refused the request, but asked Grant what terms he had in mind. On April 8, Union cavalry under Brigadier General and Brevet Major General George Armstrong Custer captured and burned three supply trains waiting for Lee's army at the Appomattox Station. Now both of the federal forces, the Army of the Potomac and the Army of the James, were converging on Appomattox.

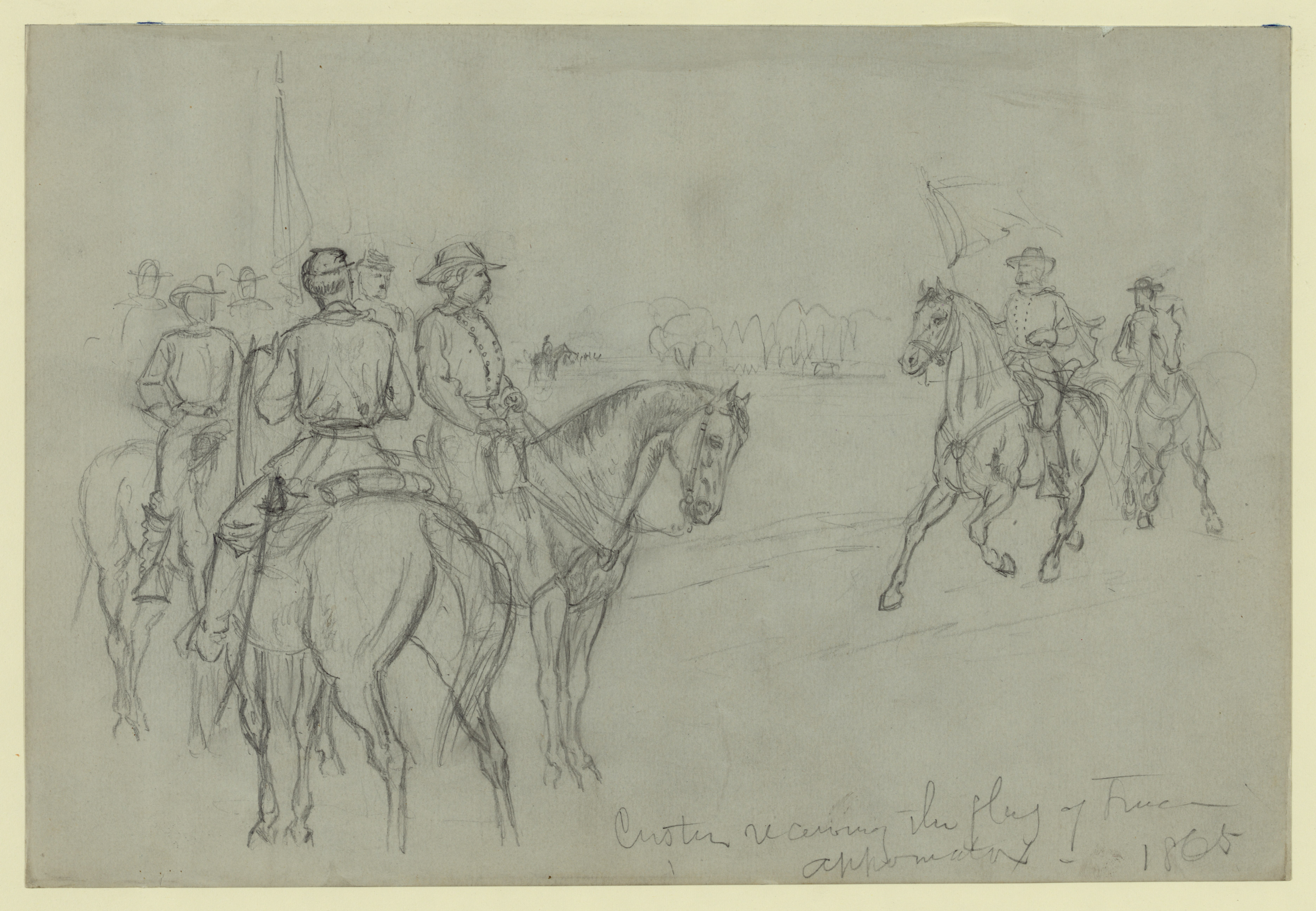
General Custer receiving the flag of truce at Appomatox, sketched by Alfred Waud

With his supplies at Appomattox Station destroyed, Lee now looked west to the railway at Lynchburg, where more supplies awaited him. However, on the morning of April 8, a battalion of the 15th Pennsylvania Cavalry was detached from Stoneman's Raid into North Carolina and southwestern Virginia and had made a demonstration to within three miles of Lynchburg, giving the appearance of being the vanguard of a much larger force. Despite this new threat, Lee apparently decided to try for Lynchburg anyway.

While the Union Army was closing in on Lee, all that lay between Lee and Lynchburg was Union cavalry. Lee hoped to break through the cavalry before infantry arrived. He sent a note to Grant saying that he did not wish to surrender his army just yet but was willing to discuss how Grant's terms would affect the Confederacy. Grant, suffering from a throbbing headache, stated that "It looks as if Lee still means to fight." The Union infantry was close, but the only unit near enough to support Sheridan's cavalry was Major General John Gibbon's XXIV Corps of the Army of the James. This corps traveled 30 miles (48 km) in 21 hours to reach the cavalry. Major General Edward O. C. Ord, commander of the Army of the James, arrived with the XXIV Corps around 4:00 a.m. while the V Corps of the Army of the Potomac was close behind. Sheridan deployed his three divisions of cavalry along a low ridge to the southwest of Appomattox Court House.

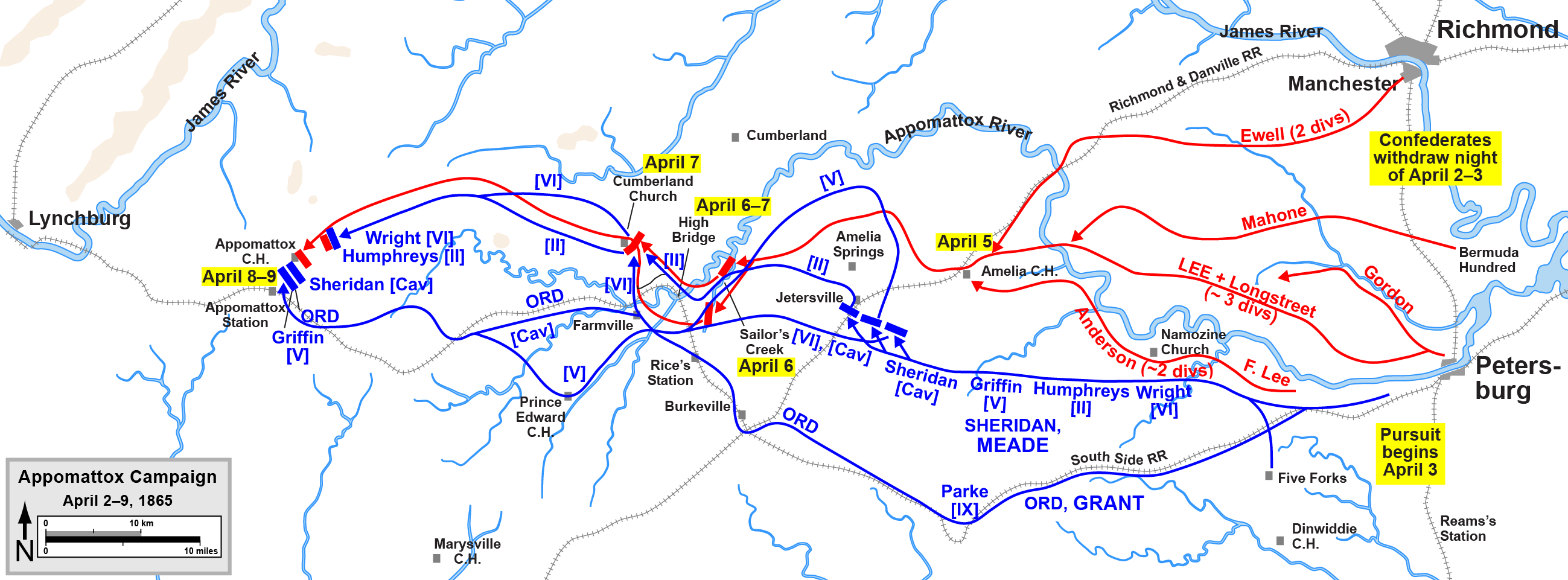
Lee's retreat and Grant's pursuit in the final Appomattox Campaign, April 2–9, 1865

== Opposing forces ==
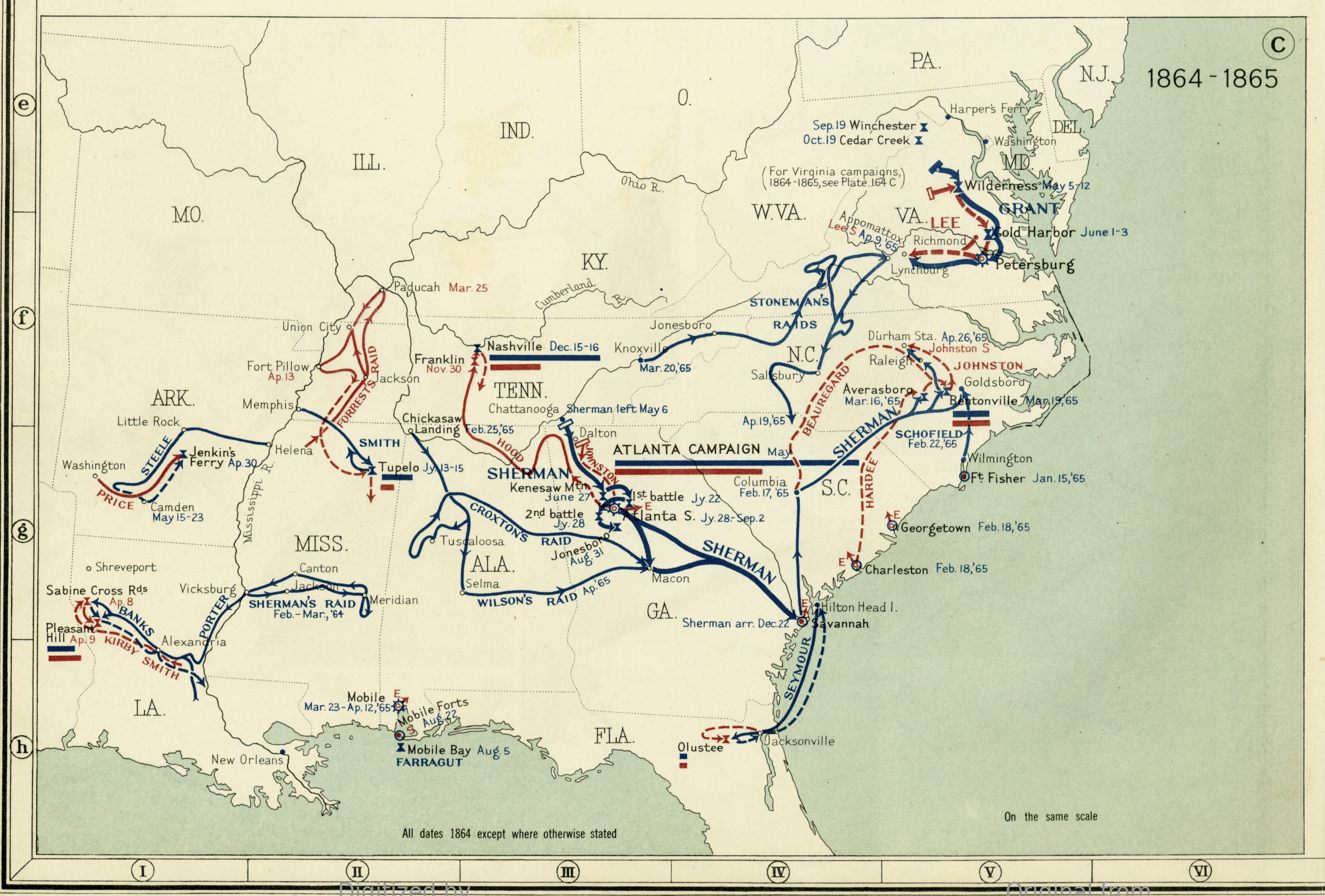
Map of the American Civil War in 1864-1865.

== April 9 ==
=== Battle ===
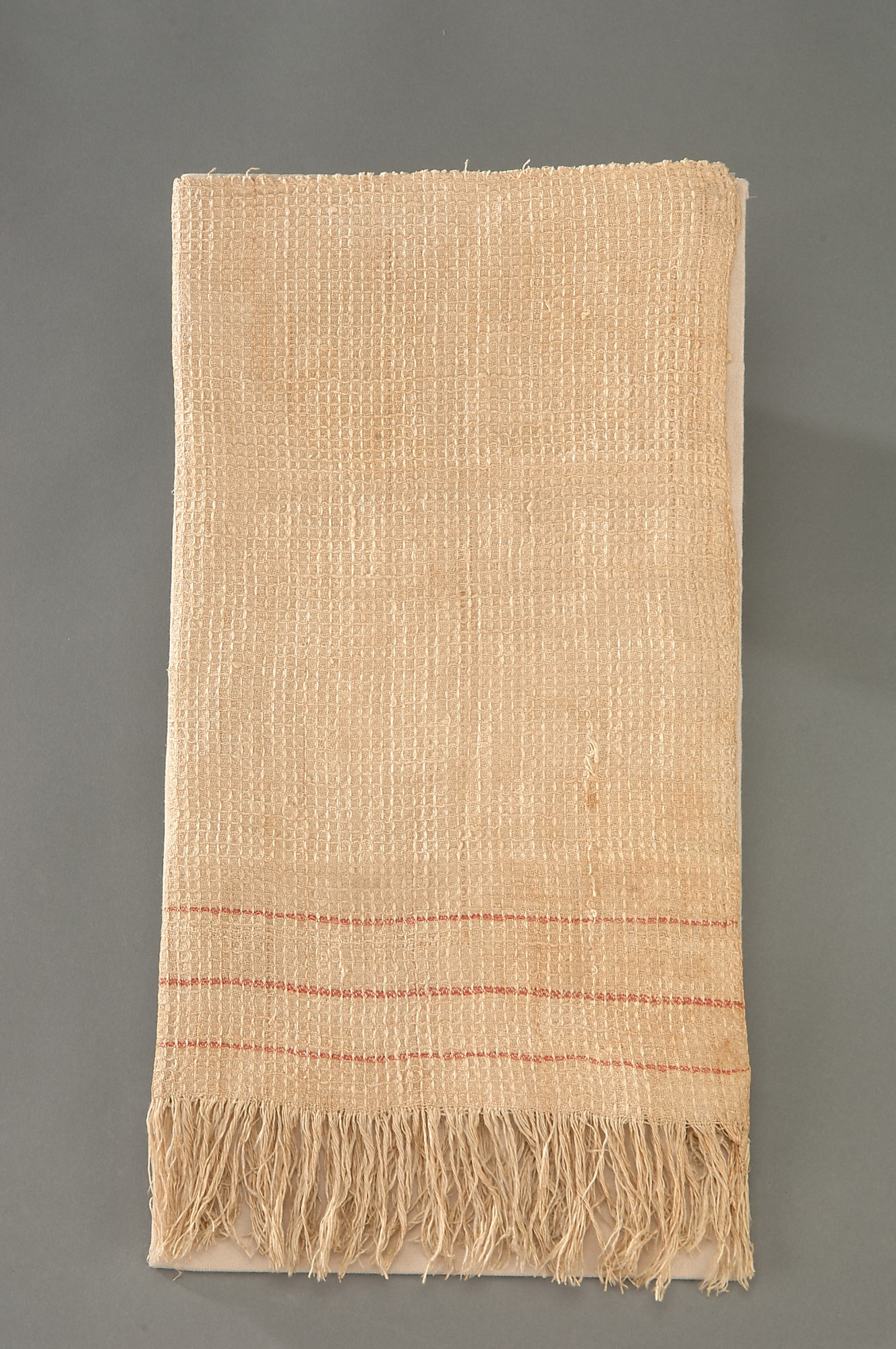
Flag used by the Confederacy to surrender

At dawn on April 9, 1865, the Confederate Second Corps under Major General John B. Gordon attacked Sheridan's cavalry and quickly forced back the first line under Brevet Brigadier General Charles H. Smith. The next line, held by Brigadier Generals Ranald S. Mackenzie and George Crook, slowed the Confederate advance. Gordon's troops charged through the Union lines and took the ridge, but as they reached the crest, they saw the entire Union XXIV Corps in line of battle with the Union V Corps to their right. Lee's cavalry saw these Union forces and immediately withdrew and rode off towards Lynchburg. Ord's troops began advancing against Gordon's corps while the Union II Corps began moving against Lieutenant General James Longstreet's corps to the northeast. Colonel Charles Venable of Lee's staff rode in at this time and asked for an assessment, and Gordon gave him a reply he knew Lee did not want to hear: "Tell General Lee I have fought my corps to a frazzle, and I fear I can do nothing unless I am heavily supported by Longstreet's corps." Upon hearing it Lee finally stated the inevitable: "Then there is nothing left for me to do but to go and see General Grant, and I would rather die a thousand deaths."

Many of Lee's officers, including Longstreet, agreed that surrendering the army was the only option left. The only notable officer opposed to surrender was Longstreet's chief of artillery, Brigadier General Edward Porter Alexander, who advocated for the troops to "scatter in the woods and bushes", and in essence continue the war in guerrilla fashion. Historian Michael Korda suggests that Lee's rejection of this was in fact one of the most consequential decisions he could have made, in that it prevented action that might have prolonged the war for months or years.

Lee decided to request a suspension of fighting while he sought to learn the terms of surrender Grant was proposing to offer. A white linen dish towel was used as a Confederate flag of truce and was carried by Capt. R. M. Sims, one of Longstreet's staff officers, into the lines of General Custer, who was part of Sheridan's command. After a truce was arranged, Custer was escorted through the lines to meet Longstreet. According to Longstreet, Custer said, "in the name of General Sheridan, I demand the unconditional surrender of this army." Longstreet replied that he was not in command of the army, but if he were he would not deal with messages from Sheridan. Custer responded that it would be a pity to have more blood upon the field, to which Longstreet suggested that the truce be respected, and then added "General Lee has gone to meet General Grant, and it is for them to determine the future of the armies."

At 8:00 a.m., Lee rode out to meet Grant, accompanied by three of his aides. Grant received Lee's first letter on the morning of April 9 as he was traveling to meet Sheridan. Grant recalled his migraine seemed to disappear when he read Lee's letter, and he handed it to his assistant Rawlins to read aloud before composing his reply:

General, Your note of this date is but this moment, 11:50 A.M. rec'd., in consequence of my having passed from the Richmond and Lynchburg road. I am at this writing about four miles West of Walker's Church and will push forward to the front for the purpose of meeting you. Notice sent to me on this road where you wish the interview to take place.

Grant's response was remarkable in that it let the defeated Lee choose the place of his surrender. Lee received the reply within an hour and dispatched an aide, Charles Marshall, to find a suitable location for the occasion. Marshall scrutinized Appomattox Court House, a small village of roughly twenty buildings that served as a waystation for travelers on the Richmond-Lynchburg Stage Road. Marshall rejected the first house he saw as too dilapidated, instead settling on the 1848 brick home of Wilmer McLean. McLean had lived near Manassas Junction during the First Battle of Bull Run and had retired to Appomattox to escape the war. (The coincidence has been written of that farmer McLean, who relocated to avoid war after one of the Civil War's first battles happened on his land, would come to have the war's end negotiated in his sitting room.)

With gunshots still being heard on Gordon's front and Union skirmishers still advancing on Longstreet's front, Lee received a message from Grant. After several hours of correspondence between Grant and Lee, a cease-fire was enacted, and Grant received Lee's request to discuss surrender terms.

=== Surrender ===
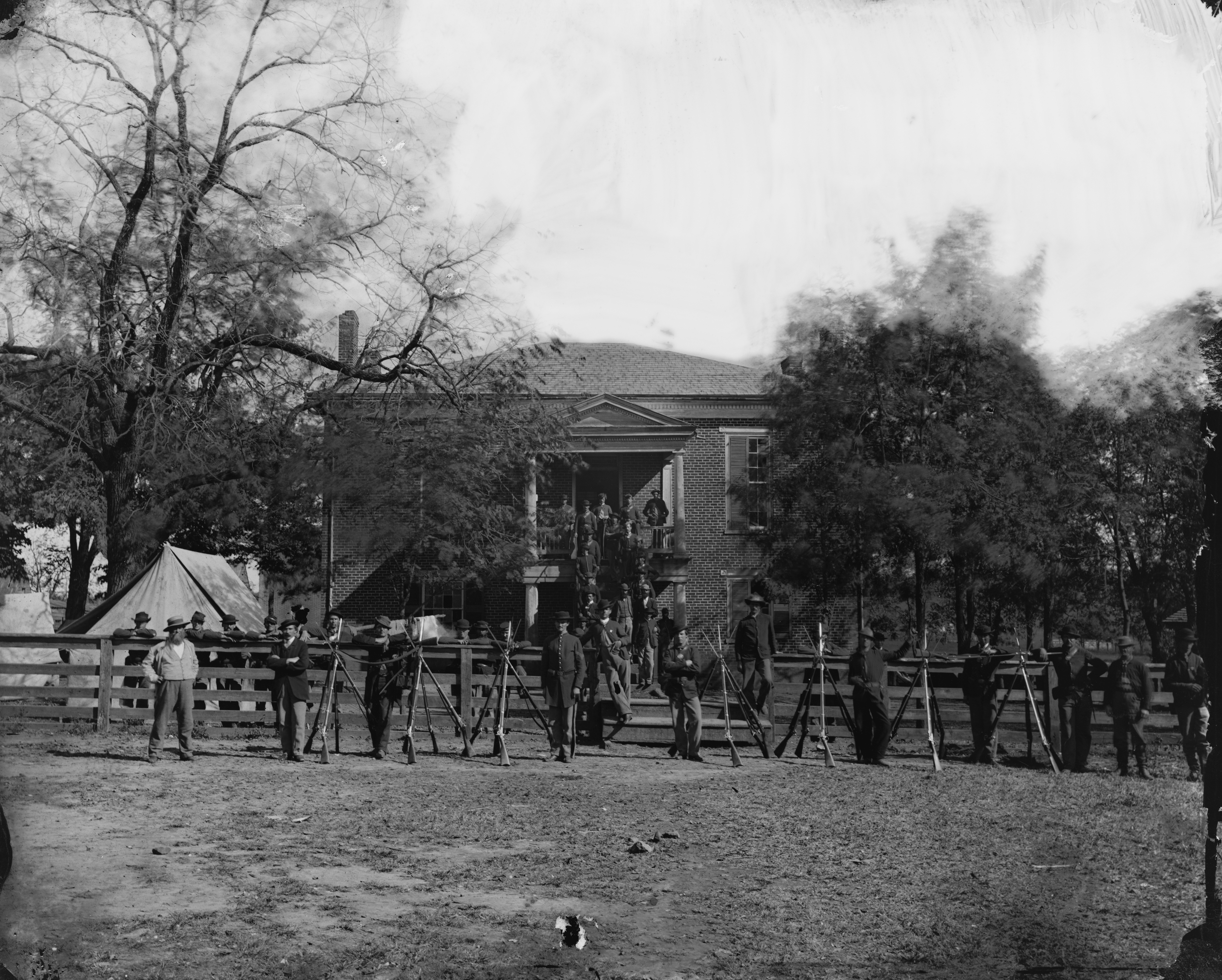
Union soldiers at the courthouse in April 1865

Dressed in his ceremonial uniform (according to himself, "I may be taken prisoner today. I must look my best."), Lee waited for Grant to arrive. Grant, whose headache had ended when he received Lee's note, arrived at the McLean house in a mud-spattered uniform—a government-issue sack coat with trousers tucked into muddy boots, no sidearms, and with only his tarnished shoulder straps showing his rank. Over one shoulder was a carrying case for his binoculars. It was the first time the two men had seen each other face-to-face in almost two decades. Suddenly overcome with sadness, Grant found it hard to get to the point of the meeting, and instead the two generals briefly discussed their only previous encounter, during the Mexican–American War. Lee brought the attention back to the issue at hand, and Grant offered the same terms he had before:

In accordance with the substance of my letter to you of the 8th inst., I propose to receive the surrender of the Army of N. Va. on the following terms, to wit: Rolls of all the officers and men to be made in duplicate. One copy to be given to an officer designated by me, the other to be retained by such officer or officers as you may designate. The officers to give their individual paroles not to take up arms against the Government of the United States until properly exchanged, and each company or regimental commander sign a like parole for the men of their commands. The arms, artillery and public property to be parked and stacked, and turned over to the officer appointed by me to receive them. This will not embrace the side-arms of the officers, nor their private horses or baggage. This done, each officer and man will be allowed to return to their homes, not to be disturbed by United States authority so long as they observe their paroles and the laws in force where they may reside.

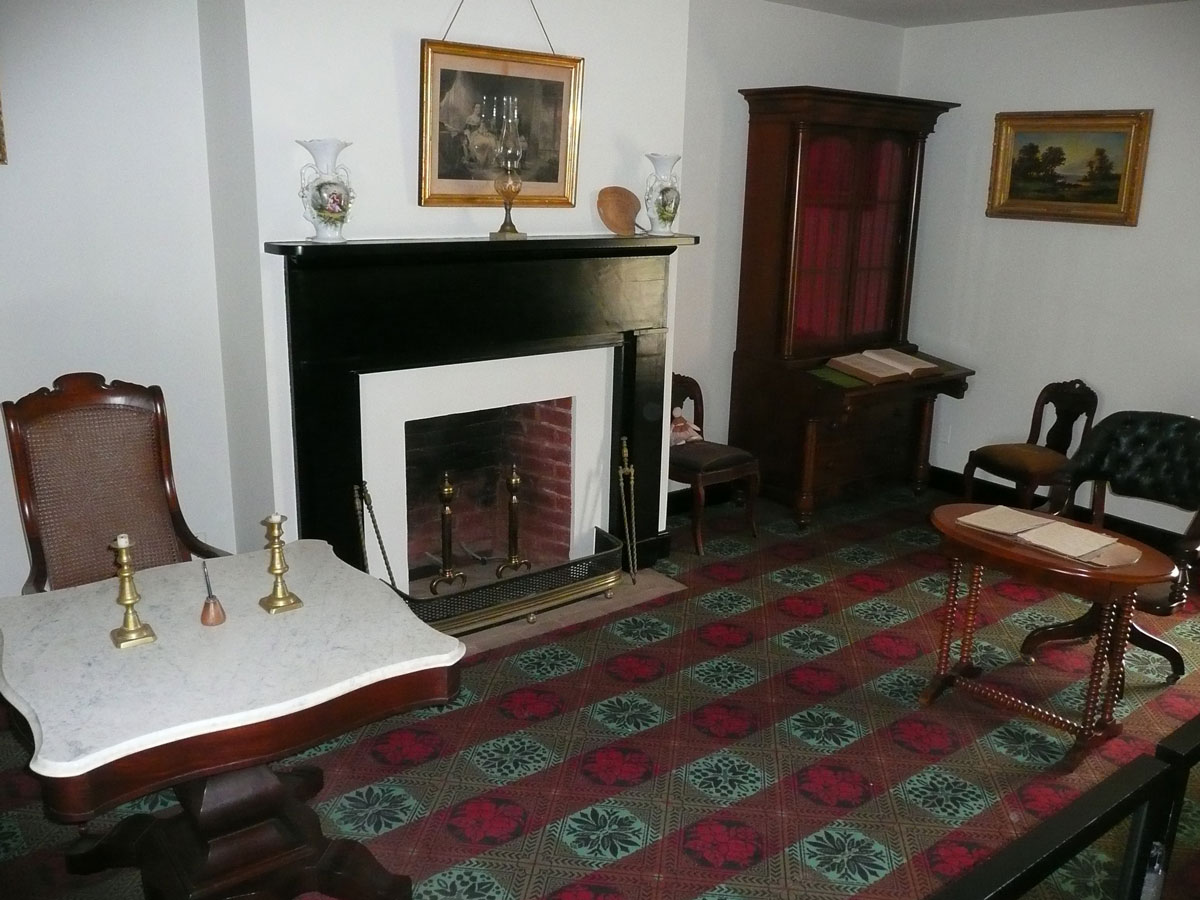
Parlor of the (reconstructed) McLean House, the site of Confederate General Robert E. Lee's surrender. Lee sat at the marble-topped table on the left, Lieutenant General Ulysses S. Grant at the table on the right

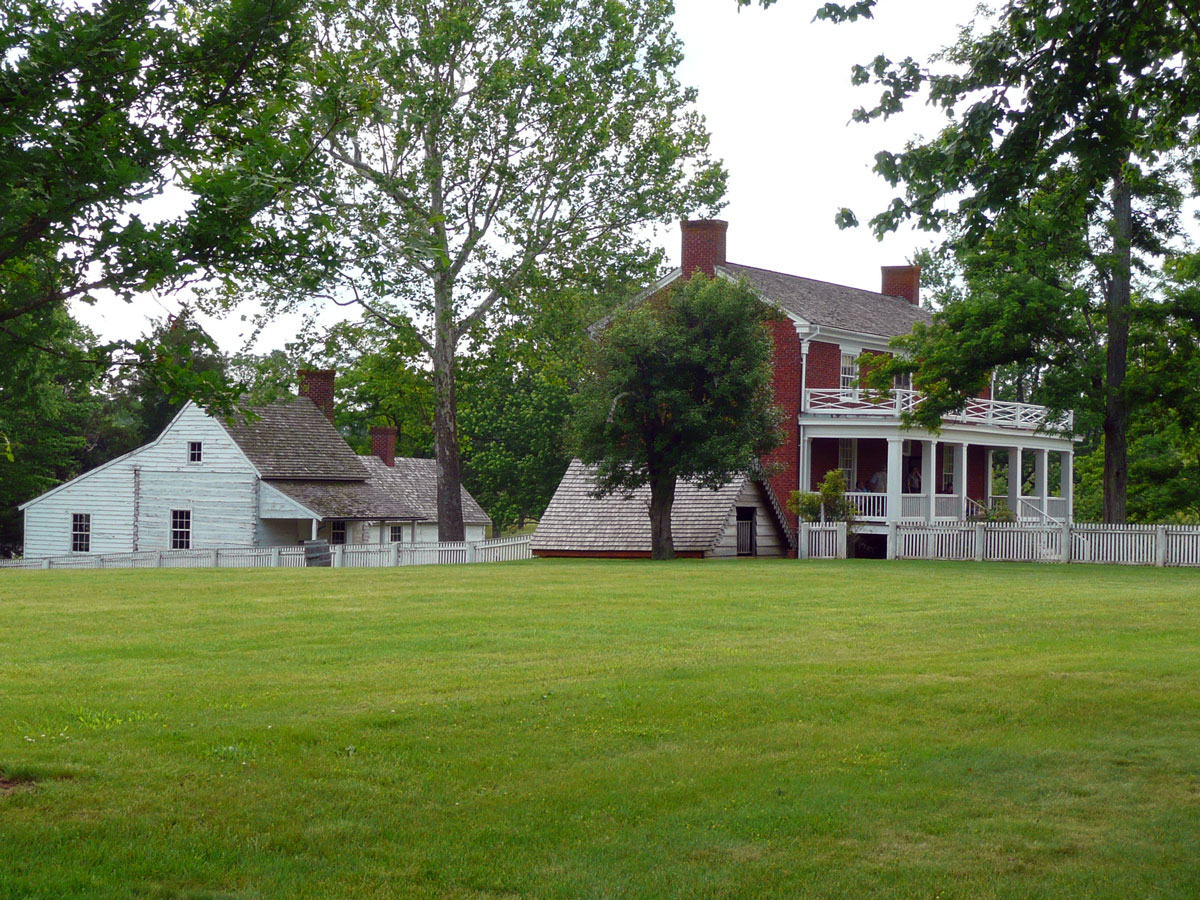
The reconstructed McLean House (brick house on right)

The terms were as generous as Lee could hope for; his men would not be imprisoned or prosecuted for treason. Officers were allowed to keep their sidearms, horses, and personal baggage. In addition to his terms, Grant also allowed the defeated men to take home their horses and mules to carry out the spring planting, and provided Lee with a supply of food rations for his starving army; Lee said it would have a very happy effect among the men and do much toward reconciling the country. The terms of the surrender were recorded in a document handwritten by Grant's adjutant, Ely S. Parker, a Native American of the Seneca tribe, and completed around 4 p.m., April 9. Lee, upon discovering Parker to be a Seneca, remarked "It is good to have one real American here." Parker replied, "Sir, we are all Americans." As Lee left the house and rode away, Grant's men began cheering in celebration, but Grant immediately ordered them to stop. "I at once sent word, however, to have it stopped", he said. "The Confederates were now our countrymen, and we did not want to exult over their downfall", he said. Custer and other Union officers purchased from McLean the furnishings of the room Lee and Grant met in as souvenirs, emptying it of furniture. Grant soon visited the Confederate army, and then he and Lee sat on the McLean home's porch and met with visitors such as Longstreet and George Pickett before the two men left for their capitals.

On April 10, Lee gave his farewell address to his army. The same day a six-man commission gathered to discuss a formal ceremony of surrender, even though no Confederate officer wished to go through with such an event. Brigadier General (brevet Major General) Joshua L. Chamberlain was the Union officer selected to lead the ceremony. In his memoirs entitled The Passing of the Armies, Chamberlain reflected on what he witnessed on April 12, 1865, as the Army of Northern Virginia marched in to surrender their arms and their colors:

The momentous meaning of this occasion impressed me deeply. I resolved to mark it by some token of recognition, which could be no other than a salute of arms. Well aware of the responsibility assumed, and of the criticisms that would follow, as the sequel proved, nothing of that kind could move me in the least. The act could be defended, if needful, by the suggestion that such a salute was not to the cause for which the flag of the Confederacy stood, but to its going down before the flag of the Union. My main reason, however, was one for which I sought no authority nor asked forgiveness. Before us in proud humiliation stood the embodiment of manhood: men whom neither toils and sufferings, nor the fact of death, nor disaster, nor hopelessness could bend from their resolve; standing before us now, thin, worn, and famished, but erect, and with eyes looking level into ours, waking memories that bound us together as no other bond;—was not such manhood to be welcomed back into a Union so tested and assured? Instructions had been given; and when the head of each division column comes opposite our group, our bugle sounds the signal and instantly our whole line from right to left, regiment by regiment in succession, gives the soldier's salutation, from the "order arms" to the old "carry"—the marching salute. Gordon at the head of the column, riding with heavy spirit and downcast face, catches the sound of shifting arms, looks up, and, taking the meaning, wheels superbly, making with himself and his horse one uplifted figure, with profound salutation as he drops the point of his sword to the boot toe; then facing to his own command, gives word for his successive brigades to pass us with the same position of the manual,—honor answering honor. On our part not a sound of trumpet more, nor roll of drum; not a cheer, nor word nor whisper of vain-glorying, nor motion of man standing again at the order, but an awed stillness rather, and breath-holding, as if it were the passing of the dead!

— Joshua L. Chamberlain, The Passing of the Armies, pp. 260–61

Chamberlain's account has been questioned by historian William Marvel, who claims that "few promoted their own legends more actively and successfully than he did". Marvel points out that Chamberlain in fact did not command the federal surrender detail (but only one of the brigades in General Joseph J. Bartlett's division) and that he did not mention any "salute" in his contemporary letters, but only in his memoirs written many decades later when most other eyewitnesses had already died. Confederate General John Brown Gordon, in command of the Second Corps of the Army of Northern Virginia, did recall there was a salute and he cherished Chamberlain's act of saluting his surrendered army, calling Chamberlain "one of the knightliest soldiers of the Federal army." Gordon stated that Chamberlain "called his troops into line, and as my men marched in front of them, the veterans in blue gave a soldierly salute to the vanquished heroes." This statement by Gordon contradicts Marvel's perception of the event.

At the surrender ceremonies, about 28,000 Confederate soldiers passed by and stacked their arms. General Longstreet's account was 28,356 officers and men were “surrendered and paroled”. The Appomattox Roster lists approximately 26,300 men who surrendered. This reference does not include the 7,700 who were captured at Sailor's Creek three days earlier, who were treated as prisoners of war.

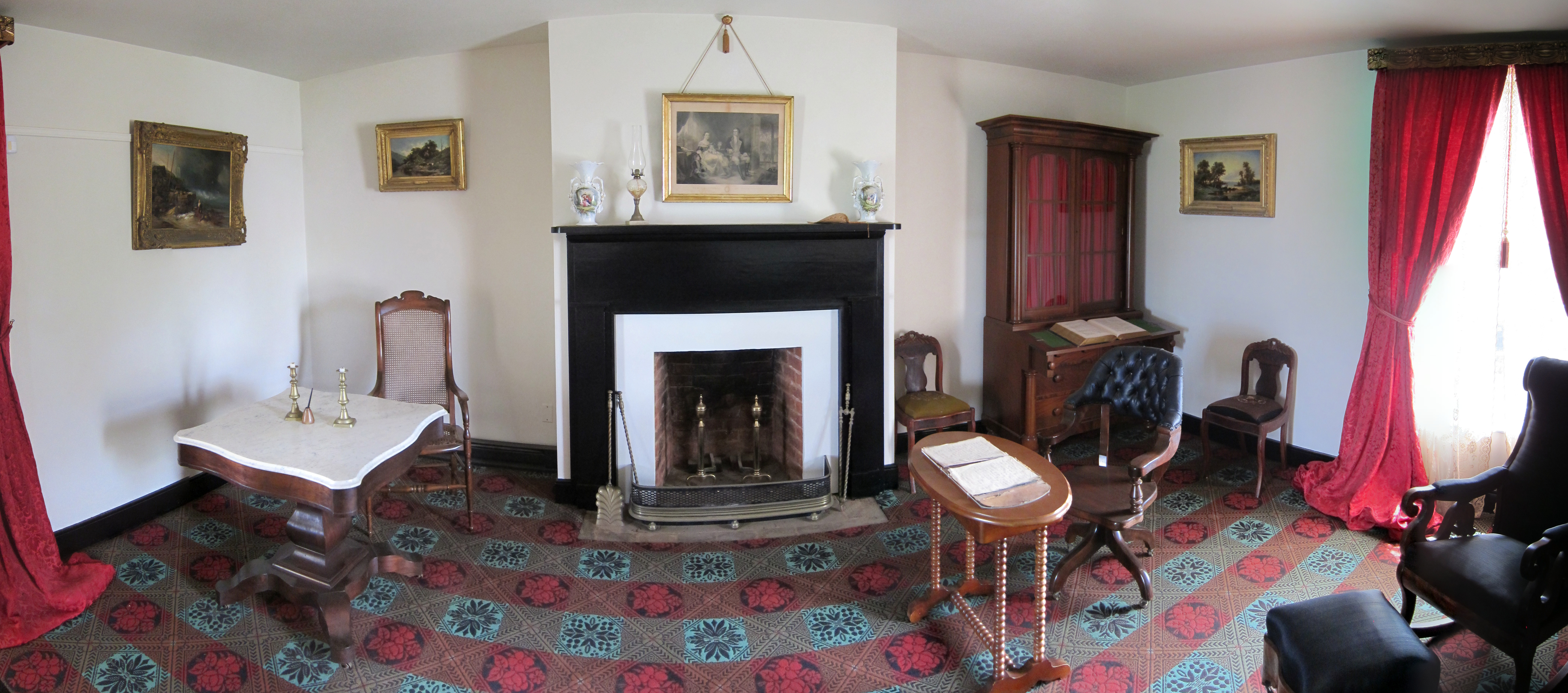
Panoramic image of the reconstructed parlor of the McLean House. Ulysses S. Grant sat at the simple wooden table on the right, while Robert E. Lee sat at the more ornate marble-topped table on the left. The items in the room are exact reproductions; the original chairs and wooden table are in the collection of the Smithsonian (Note: Sheridan paid $20 worth of gold for the wooden table and gave it to Elizabeth Bacon Custer, writing to her that her husband was possibly the most instrumental person in forcing the surrender.) and the marble table in the Chicago History Museum's collection.

== Aftermath ==
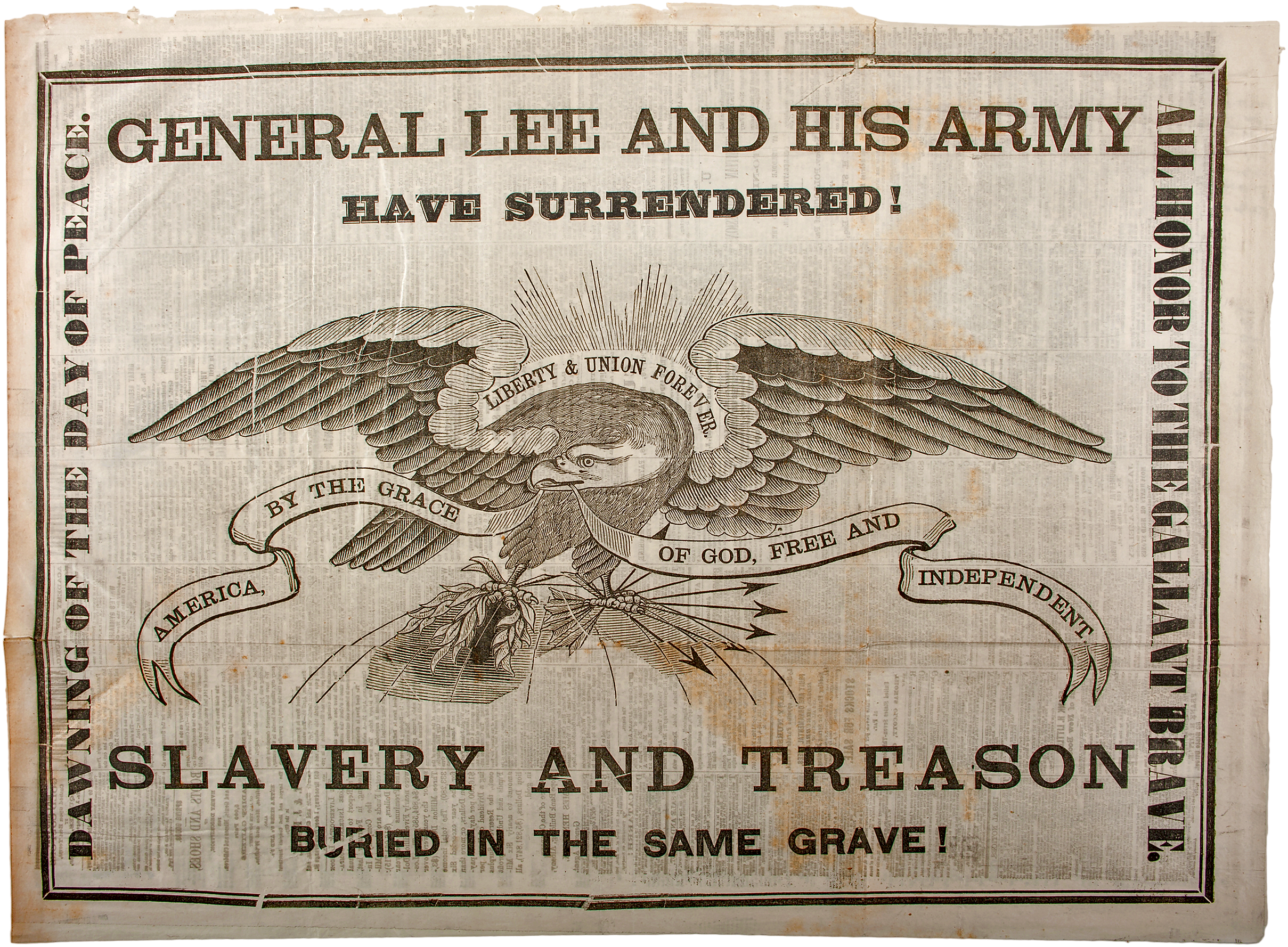
Full Page of Albany Journal, April 10, 1865

While General George Meade (who was not present at the meeting) reportedly shouted that "it's all over" upon hearing the surrender was signed, roughly 175,000 Confederates remained in the field, but were mostly starving and disillusioned. Many of these were scattered throughout the South in garrisons or guerrilla bands while the rest were concentrated in three major Confederate commands. As news spread of Lee's surrender, other Confederate commanders realized that the strength of the Confederacy was gone, and decided to lay down their own arms.

General Joseph E. Johnston's army in North Carolina, the most threatening of the remaining Confederate armies, surrendered to Major General William T. Sherman at Bennett Place in Durham, North Carolina, on April 26, 1865. The 89,270 Confederate troops who laid down their weapons (the largest surrender of the war) marked the virtual end of the conflict. General Richard Taylor surrendered his army, the Departments of Alabama, Mississippi and East Louisiana, at Citronelle, Alabama, on May 4, 1865. President Jefferson Davis met with his Confederate Cabinet for the last time on May 5, 1865 in Washington, Georgia, and officially dissolved the Confederate government. Davis and his wife Varina, along with their escort, were captured by Union forces on May 10 at Irwinville, Georgia.

Upon hearing about Lee's surrender, General Nathan Bedford Forrest, future leader of the Ku Klux Klan, also surrendered, reading his farewell address on May 9, 1865, at Gainesville, Alabama. General Edmund Kirby Smith surrendered the Confederate Trans-Mississippi Department on June 2, 1865, in Galveston, Texas. Also on May 26, 1865, the Native American tribes that had sided with the Confederacy, met at the Camp Napoleon Council in modern-day Oklahoma and decided to have commissioners offer peace with the United States. Cherokee Chief and General Stand Watie, in command of 1st Cherokee Mounted Rifles, surrendered the last sizeable organized Confederate force on June 23, 1865, in Doaksville, Choctaw Nation.

There were several more small battles after Lee's surrender. The Battle of Palmito Ranch, east of Brownsville, Texas, on May 12–13, 1865, is commonly regarded as the final land battle of the war (ironically a Confederate victory which was followed soon after by the surrender of the Confederate forces). Commander James Iredell Waddell in command of the CSS Shenandoah, a commerce raider of the Confederate States Navy, was the last to surrender when he lowered the Confederate flag in Liverpool and surrendered his vessel to the British government on November 6, 1865 (Waddell was halfway around the world in the Pacific when he learned the war had ended).

Lee never forgot Grant's magnanimity during the surrender, and for the rest of his life would not tolerate an unkind word about Grant in his presence. Confederate General Longstreet spoke well of his old friend Grant, saying he was grateful to Grant for a cheerful greeting and providing him a cigar at Appomattox, as well as later efforts by Grant to get Longstreet a pardon and appointing him to a federal position in New Orleans after Grant became president. Likewise, General John Brown Gordon cherished Chamberlain's simple act of saluting his surrendered army, calling Chamberlain "one of the knightliest soldiers of the Federal army."

== Civil War commemorative stamps ==
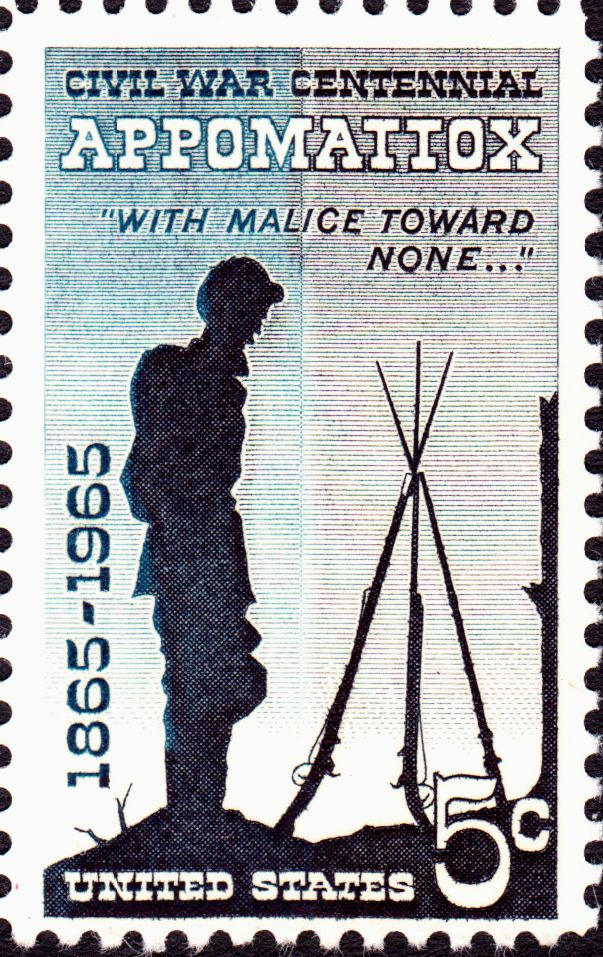
U.S. Postage Stamp, 1965 issue, commemorating the centennial anniversary of the Confederate surrender at Appomattox Court House

During the Civil War Centennial, the United States Post Office issued five postage stamps commemorating the 100th anniversaries of famous battles, as they occurred over a four-year period, beginning with the Battle of Fort Sumter Centennial issue of 1961. The Battle of Shiloh commemorative stamp was issued in 1962, the Battle of Gettysburg in 1963, the Battle of the Wilderness in 1964, and the Appomattox Centennial commemorative stamp in 1965.

== Battlefield preservation ==
The American Battlefield Trust and its battlefield land preservation partners have acquired and preserved 512 acres (2.07 km^{2}) of the battlefield.

== See also ==
- List of American Civil War battles
- Bibliography of the American Civil War
- Bibliography of Abraham Lincoln
- Bibliography of Ulysses S. Grant
- Commemoration of the American Civil War on postage stamps
