= William Y. Slack =

Confederate States Army general (1816–1862)

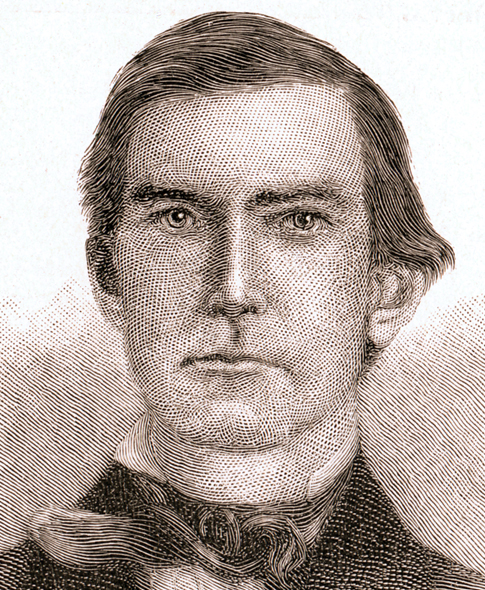
- 1894 engraving of a photograph of Slack
- Born: August 1, 1816; Mason County, Kentucky, U.S.
- Died: March 21, 1862 (aged 45); Benton County, Arkansas, U.S.
- Burial place: Fayetteville Confederate Cemetery
- Military career
- Allegiance: United States; Confederate States of America
- Branch: United States Army; Confederate States Army
- Service years: 1846–1847 (U.S.); 1861–1862 (C.S.)
- Rank: Captain (U.S.); Brigadier general (C.S.)
- Unit: Missouri State Guard
- Commands: 4th Division
- Conflicts: Mexican–American War; Battle of Embudo Pass; Siege of Pueblo de Taos; American Civil War; Battle of Carthage; Battle of Wilson's Creek; Battle of Pea Ridge
- Other work: Attorney, state legislator

Member of the Missouri House of Representatives for Livingston County
- In office 1842–1843

Personal details
- Party: Democratic

William Yarnel Slack (August 1, 1816 – March 21, 1862) was an American lawyer, politician, and military officer who fought for the Confederate States of America during the American Civil War. Born in Kentucky, Slack moved to Missouri as a child and later entered the legal profession. After serving in the Missouri General Assembly from 1842 to 1843, he fought as a captain in the United States Army for fourteen months during the Mexican–American War, beginning in 1846. He saw action at the Battle of Embudo Pass and the Siege of Pueblo de Taos. Returning to a legal career, Slack became influential in his area.

After the outbreak of the American Civil War in April 1861, Slack, who held pro-slavery views, supported the Confederate cause. When the Missouri State Guard (MSG) was formed the next month to oppose the Union Army, he was appointed as a brigadier general in the MSG's 4th Division. After participating in the Battle of Carthage in July, he fought in the Battle of Wilson's Creek on August 10. After a surprise Union attack, Slack's deployment of his division gave time for further Confederate States Army and MSG troops to deploy. Suffering a bad hip wound at Wilson's Creek, he was unable to rejoin his command until October.

Along with other Missouri State Guard officers, Slack transferred to the Confederate States Army in late 1861 where he commanded a brigade with the rank of colonel. On March 7, 1862, during the Battle of Pea Ridge, Slack suffered another wound that was close to the injury he had received at Wilson's Creek. Infection set in, and he died on March 21. He was posthumously promoted to brigadier general in the Confederate army on April 17; the Confederate States Senate might not have known that he was dead at the time of the promotion.

== Early life and career ==
William Yarnel Slack was born on August 1, 1816, in Mason County, Kentucky. His father, John Slack, farmed and made pottery; his mother was Mary J. Caldwell Slack. The historian Kenneth E. Burchett states that Slack had Quaker roots. In 1819, the family moved to Columbia in the Missouri Territory to pursue agricultural opportunities. Slack's father became a justice of the peace and grew tobacco. The younger Slack was educated in the Columbia area, studying law under one J. B. Gordon, but returned to Kentucky in 1837 to pursue a legal career. After returning to Columbia in 1839, he was admitted to the bar and relocated to Chillicothe where he opened a law office, as there were more opportunities for new lawyers in that town. According to historian Jeffery S. Prushankin, Slack gained a reputation for "coolness under pressure as well as for his honesty and integrity". Entering into politics in 1842 as a member of the Democratic Party, he was elected to the Missouri General Assembly. His term ended in 1843. Three years later he was part of Missouri's state constitutional convention. Slack married Mary E. Woodward in 1842 and they had two children during the 1840s.

Despite opposing war in general, Slack organized a company in 1846 for service in the Mexican–American War. The unit became part of the 2nd Missouri Mounted Volunteers, and Slack was elected captain of Company L. The 2nd Missouri Volunteers served under Colonel Sterling Price, and Slack was in the army for fourteen months. Engaged in the fighting that took place in the Santa Fe area, Slack's conduct at the Battle of Embudo Pass in January 1847 gained praise from Price, and Slack's men blocked the enemy's retreat route in the Siege of Pueblo de Taos.

After his military service ended, Slack returned to Chillicothe and legal practice. Continuing to be involved in politics, he was influential in his local area. Supporting slavery and states' rights, he adhered to strict constructionism and opposed secession during the 1850s. Slack's wife died in 1858; he wed Isabella R. Bower the next year and they had two children. During the 1860 United States presidential election, he supported the candidacy of John C. Breckinridge. After Abraham Lincoln won the election in 1860, Slack considered that secession and war were likely.

== American Civil War ==
=== Battle of Carthage ===
Following Lincoln's election, a number of slave states in the American south seceded from the United States and formed the Confederate States of America. The American Civil War began in April 1861 when secessionist forces attacked Fort Sumter. Tensions grew in Missouri, with Governor Claiborne Fox Jackson mobilizing pro-secession militia to oppose Union Army forces. Union forces commanded by Brigadier General Nathaniel Lyon dispersed Jackson's militia in the Camp Jackson affair that ended in a bloody riot. These events led to Slack becoming a secessionist. After the events at Camp Jackson and the riot, the state legislature formed a new militia organization known as the Missouri State Guard (MSG), which was commanded by Price, who was now a major general. The MSG was composed of nine divisions, each based on a region of the state, with each division commanded by a brigadier general. The use of divisions was purely geographic, as they were not structured in the traditional military sense. The Ninth Division was never effectively formed due to Union control of the St. Louis region, and the other divisions ranged in size from roughly 400 men to over 2,000.

Map showing the geographical division of the Missouri State Guard. Slack commanded the 4th Division.

On May 18, Slack was appointed a brigadier general in the MSG by Jackson. (Note: John H. Eicher and David J. Eicher list Slack's date of appointment to brigadier general as July 4, 1861.) Slack's command was later designated the Fourth Division, (Note: Prushankin states that Slack's original orders were to recruit within Missouri's Fifth Congressional District and that it was redesignated the Fourth Division of the MSG after Slack took his men south. Bridges states that Slack's May 18 appointment was as commander of the Fourth Division. Burchett states that Slack's original command was from Missouri's Fifth District but that he became commander of the Fourth Division the day before the Battle of Carthage. Eicher and Eicher have Slack taking command of the Fifth on July 4, 1861, and taking command of the Fourth in August. The historian Stewart Sifakis states that Slack was ordered to gather his 5th District command on July 4, 1861, and that it was soon redesignated to the 4th Division.) and its recruiting area included Chillicothe. From a base along the Chariton River, he recruited and trained soldiers for the MSG, but he left the recruiting area in June as Union forces were moving into it. Slack moved his men to the Lexington area, but by that time the MSG had abandoned Jefferson City, the state capital, and had been defeated in the Battle of Boonville. The defeat at Boonville and loss of the capital forced Price to withdraw the MSG to southern Missouri, where he hoped to cooperate with Confederate forces in Arkansas commanded by Brigadier General Ben McCulloch. Brigadier General James S. Rains, who commanded the Eighth Division of the MSG, and Slack were ordered to organize their MSG units in the Lexington area and then move south. Slack was a disciplinarian as a commander, and his men showed, in the words of Burchett, "a special affection for him".

Jackson had gathered together MSG troops near Lamar, and in early July began moving to join Price in southern Missouri. Late on July 4, Jackson learned that Union forces commanded by Franz Sigel were near Carthage. Jackson formed his troops – the divisions of Slack, Rains, John B. Clark Sr., and Mosby Monroe Parsons – in preparation to defend against an attack. Slack's command at this time numbered about 1,200 men, and had components of both infantry and cavalry. In the ensuing Battle of Carthage, Jackson remained in the rear and did not exercise overall command, leaving Slack and the other MSG commanders to operate largely independently. Sigel attacked the MSG lines but was repulsed and driven back through Carthage itself. During the fighting at Carthage, Slack's infantry was positioned in the middle of the MSG line, while his cavalry component was detached with other MSG cavalry to operate on the Union flank. Slack's infantry was most heavily engaged during the later stages of the battle, when the retreating Union soldiers were being pursued near the town.

=== Wilson's Creek ===
The MSG then gathered at Cowskin Prairie in McDonald County, but it moved to Cassville to unite with McCulloch's command. The two forces combined in late July. By then, Lyon's Union forces had occupied Springfield. Price agreed to allow McCulloch to hold overall command with Price as a subordinate, but the relationship between the two officers was rocky. In early August, the combined forces of McCulloch and Price had begun an advance towards Springfield and encamped along Wilsons Creek on August 7. Late on August 9, Slack and several other officers supported Price in pushing McCulloch to order an attack against Springfield, which was scheduled to begin the next morning. However, Lyon struck the Confederate camp in a surprise attack on the morning of August 10, bringing on the Battle of Wilson's Creek. An acoustic shadow prevented Confederate troops from hearing the firing at the beginning of the battle, and Slack's cavalry component was surprised to encounter Lyon's troops. Slack's cavalry, under the command of Colonel Benjamin A. Rives, made a brief stand that allowed Confederate troops elsewhere time to reorganize, but was driven back. Slack quickly deployed his infantry into line next to some other Confederate cavalry to face the Union troops. This deployment gave Price time to deploy other units into line. This infantry was later engaged in assaulting a position that Union troops had taken up on a prominence known as Bloody Hill, at one point holding the right of the Confederate line. Three Confederate assaults were repulsed between 7:50 am and 11:00 am, but the Union troops withdrew from the field, with Lyon dead, a Union flanking attack repulsed, and ammunition running low.

McCulloch's post-battle report praised Slack, although the latter suffered a bad hip wound while leading an assault. Because of his wound, Slack missed the campaign associated with the Siege of Lexington, but he was able to resume command on October 11. In November, a portion of the Missouri state government voted to secede, creating the Confederate government of Missouri, which functioned as a government-in-exile. It is most likely that this portion of the legislature lacked a proper quorum to declare such an action. While the Confederates recognized this government, the United States government recognized the Provisional Government of Missouri, which had been formed several months earlier by the majority of an earlier constitutional convention and had declared the prior elected offices to be vacant. Many members of the MSG formally joined the Confederate army, including Slack. Price gave Slack a commission as a colonel in the Confederate army, although Price may not have had authorization to do this. On January 23, 1862, after the Confederate Army of the West was formed, Slack was given command of the 2nd Missouri Brigade, a roughly 1,100-man organization that included both Confederate and MSG troops.

=== Pea Ridge ===
In January 1862, Price abandoned Missouri and fell back into Arkansas, having been pressured by Union forces commanded by Brigadier General Samuel R. Curtis. Major General Earl Van Dorn was placed in command of Confederate forces in the Trans-Mississippi, and he began a campaign to retake Missouri. Van Dorn sent his army on a hard march to reach the rear of Curtis's position, but the Union commander was able to redeploy his forces to meet the attack, bringing on the Battle of Pea Ridge on March 7. Advancing that morning, Slack's brigade held the right of Price's forward line. After repulsing a Union cavalry regiment, Slack's men encountered a stronger Union line which was in the process of deploying, resulting in a brief clash of skirmishers during which time Slack was shot.

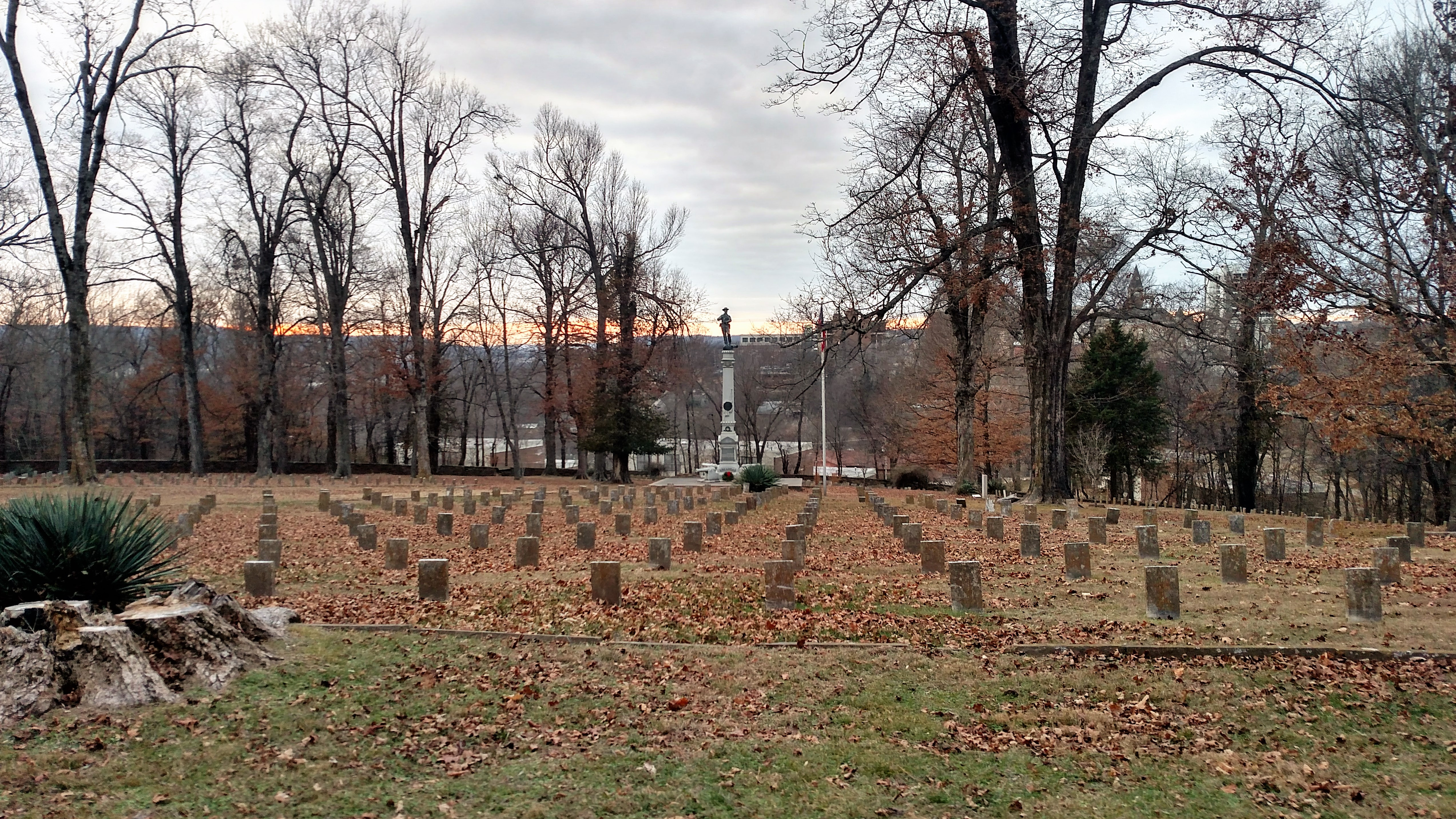
The Fayetteville Confederate Cemetery, where Slack is buried

Confederate Colonel Thomas H. Rosser stated that the bullet hit Slack in the hip, taking a downward path to exit his body, while another of Slack's soldiers later wrote that the bullet had deflected off of a tree limb and then struck Slack in the groin. Partially paralyzed by the wound, Slack was removed from the field. The wound was very close to where he had been injured at Wilson's Creek. Initially transported to a private home, east of the field, he was moved to another location 7 miles (11 km) to the east to avoid capture by Union forces. The wound became infected after the move, and he died on March 21. The Confederate government promoted Slack to brigadier general in the Confederate army on April 17, with the promotion to date from April 12 for seniority purposes. It is possible that news of his death had not reached the Confederate States Senate. The historian Ezra J. Warner writes that Slack was buried "in the yard" at the place where he died, while Prushankin states that he was buried in the Roller Ridge Cemetery. Slack was reburied on May 27, 1880, in the Fayetteville Confederate Cemetery. In 1887, a memorial was installed at the Pea Ridge battlefield to honor the Confederate soldiers killed there. Three Confederate generals who died as a result of the battle were named on the memorial: Slack, McCulloch, and James M. McIntosh.

The historians William L. Shea and Earl J. Hess report that Slack was competent and popular, but had a tendency to be reckless when it came to his personal safety. After Pea Ridge, Price wrote that Slack was one of his "best and bravest officers". According to Rosser, Slack's men were "devotedly attached to him" and that he was a "model of soldierly bearing". Prushankin writes that Confederate veterans generally viewed Slack as "a person of integrity and courage", and states that he views his primary service to the Confederacy as having been his "ability to inspire and motivate his men". Burchett describes Slack as "of much more than ordinary ability, cool and clearheaded, and a model of soldierly bearing".

== See also ==
- List of American Civil War generals (Confederate)

== Sources ==
- Bearss, Ed (1975). The Battle of Wilson's Creek. Bozeman, Montana: George Washington Carver Birthplace District Association. OCLC 1327752289.
- Bridges, Hal (1951). "A Confederate Hero: General William Y. Slack". Arkansas Historical Quarterly. 10 (3): 233–237. doi:10.2307/40024252. JSTOR 40024252.
- Burchett, Kenneth E. (2013). The Battle of Carthage, Missouri: First Trans-Mississippi Conflict of the Civil War. Jefferson, North Carolina: McFarland & Company. ISBN 978-0-7864-6959-8.
- Eicher, John H.; Eicher, David J. (2001). Civil War High Commands. Stanford, California: Stanford University Press. ISBN 978-0-8047-3641-1.
- Eisenhower, John S. D. (2000) [1989]. So Far From God: The U.S. War with Mexico, 1846–1848 (Oklahoma Paperback ed.). Norman, Oklahoma: University of Oklahoma Press. ISBN 978-0-8061-3279-2.
- Hatcher, Richard W. (1998). "Wilson's Creek, Missouri". In Kennedy, Frances H. (ed.). The Civil War Battlefield Guide (2nd ed.). Boston/New York: Houghton Mifflin. pp. 21–23. ISBN 978-0-3957-4012-5.
- Hinze, David C.; Farnham, Karen (2004) [1997]. The Battle of Carthage: Border War In Southwest Missouri July 5, 1861 (First Pelican ed.). Gretna, Louisiana: Pelican Publishing. ISBN 1-58980-223-3.
- Kennedy, Frances H., ed. (1998). The Civil War Battlefield Guide (2nd ed.). Boston/New York: Houghton Mifflin. ISBN 978-0-395-74012-5.
- McPherson, James M. (1998). "Fort Sumter I, South Carolina". In Kennedy, Frances H. (ed.). The Civil War Battlefield Guide (2nd ed.). Boston/New York: Houghton Mifflin. pp. 1–4. ISBN 978-0-395-74012-5.
- Parrish, William E. (2001) [1973]. A History of Missouri. Vol. III: 1860 to 1875. Columbia, Missouri: University of Missouri Press. ISBN 0-8262-1376-6.
- Piston, William Garrett; Hatcher, Richard W. (2000). Wilson's Creek: The Second Battle of the Civil War and the Men Who Fought It. Chapel Hill, North Carolina: University of North Carolina Press. ISBN 0-8078-2515-8.
- Prushankin, Jeffery S. (2008). "Brig. Gen. William Yarnel Slack". In Allardice, Bruce S.; Hewitt, Lawrence Lee (eds.). Kentuckians in Gray: Confederate Generals and Field Officers of the Bluegrass State. Lexington, Kentucky: University Press of Kentucky. pp. 237–243. ISBN 978-0-8131-2475-9.
- Shea, William L.; Hess, Earl J. (1992). Pea Ridge: Civil War Campaign in the West. Chapel Hill, North Carolina: University of North Carolina Press. ISBN 0-8078-4669-4.
- Sifakis, Stewart (1988). Who Was Who in the Civil War. New York City: Facts On File. ISBN 0-8160-1055-2.
- Warner, Ezra J. (2006) [1959]. Generals in Gray: Lives of the Confederate Commanders (Louisiana Paperback ed.). Baton Rouge, Louisiana: Louisiana State University Press. ISBN 978-0-8071-3150-3.
- Welsh, Jack D. (1995). Medical Histories of Confederate Generals. Kent, Ohio: Kent State University Press. ISBN 0-8733-8505-5.
