= Conclusion of the American Civil War =

Surrender of the Confederacy
- Part of the American Civil War
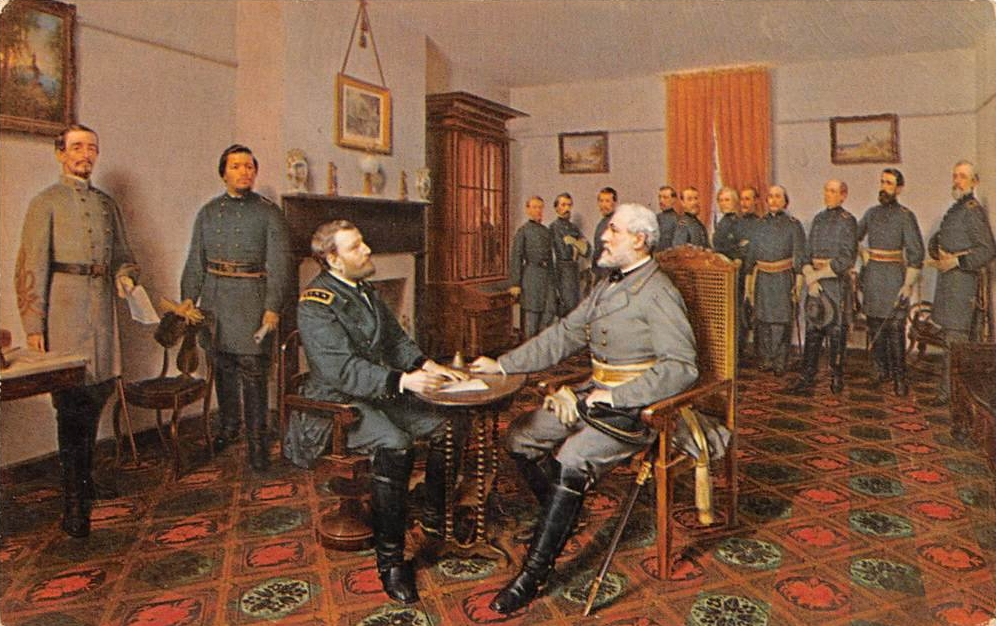
- Surrender of Lee to Grant by Louis Guillaume
- Date: April 9 – November 6, 1865 (6 months and 4 weeks)
- Location: Southern United States
- Cause: Appomattox campaign

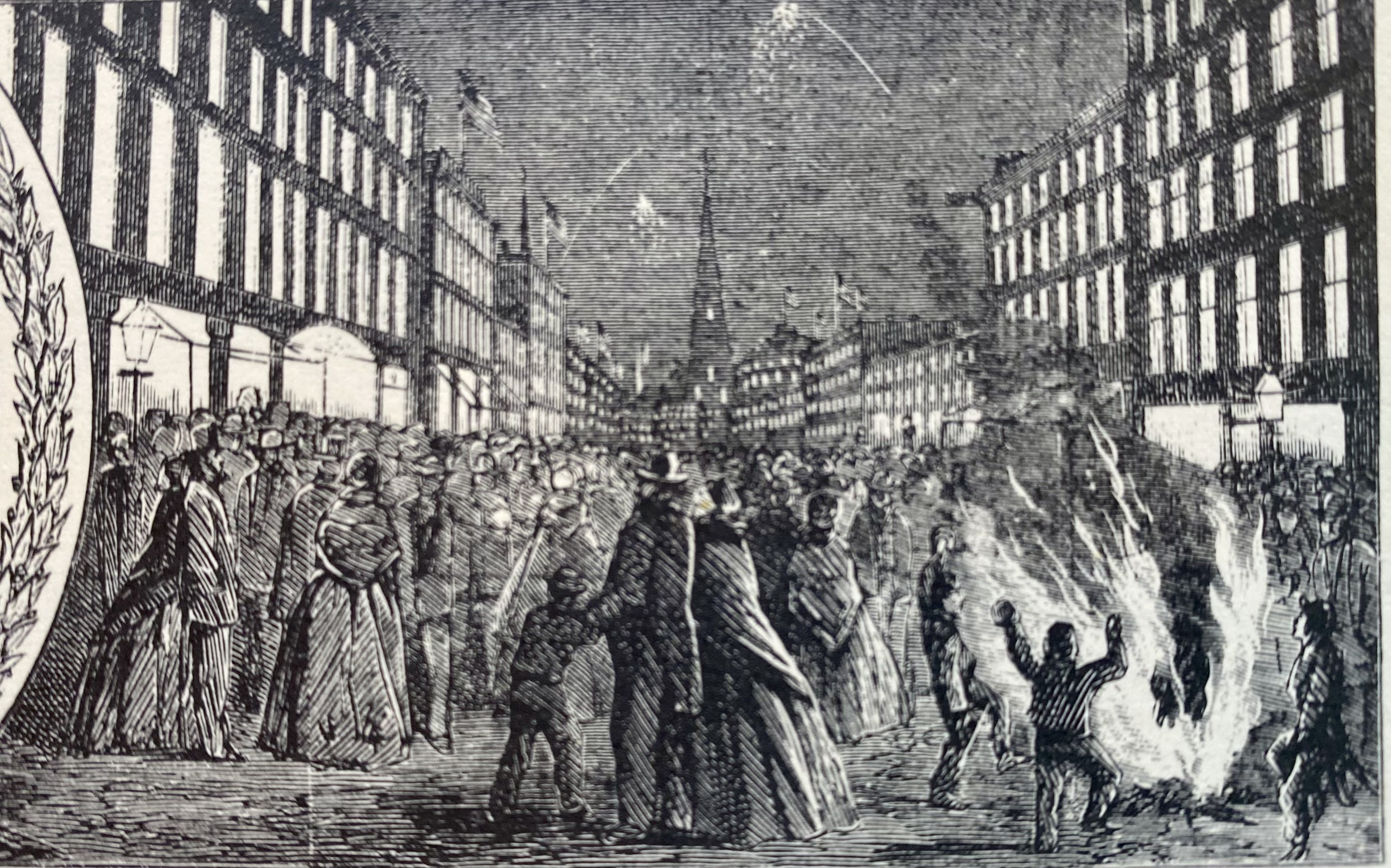
Our Arms Victorious by Thomas Nast, detail entitled "Rejoicing Over Union Victories" (Harper's Weekly, June 24, 1865)

Location of the Confederate States (dark green), disputed states and the Arizona Territory (light green)

The conclusion of the American Civil War commenced with the articles of surrender agreement of the Army of Northern Virginia on April 9, 1865, at the Virginian village of Appomattox Court House, by General Robert E. Lee and concluded with the surrender of CSS Shenandoah on November 6, 1865, bringing the hostilities of the American Civil War to a close. Legally, the war did not end until a proclamation by President Andrew Johnson on August 20, 1866, when he declared "that the said insurrection is at an end and that peace, order, tranquillity, and civil authority now exist in and throughout the whole of the United States of America". The Confederate government being in the final stages of collapse, the war ended by debellatio, with no definitive capitulation from the rapidly disintegrating Confederacy; rather, Lee's surrender marked the effective end of Confederate military operations. The Confederate cabinet held its final meeting on May 5, at which point it declared the Confederacy dissolved, ending its substantive existence; despite this, some remnant Confederate units did not surrender for another month.

Lee's defeat on April 9 began the effective end of the war, after which there was no substantial resistance, but the news of his surrender took time to spread and some fighting continued, though only small skirmishes. President Abraham Lincoln lived to see Lee's surrender after four bloody years of war, but he was assassinated just five days later. The Battle of Columbus, Georgia, was fought on April 16, the day after Lincoln died. For the most part though, news of Lee's defeat led to a wave of Confederate surrenders. Gen. Joseph E. Johnston surrendered his large Army of Tennessee and the Southeastern Department on April 26. The Confederate cabinet was dissolved on May 5, and Confederate president Jefferson Davis was captured by Union soldiers on May 10, one day after Lincoln's successor, Andrew Johnson, declared that the belligerent rights of the Confederacy were at an end, with the rebellion effectively over.

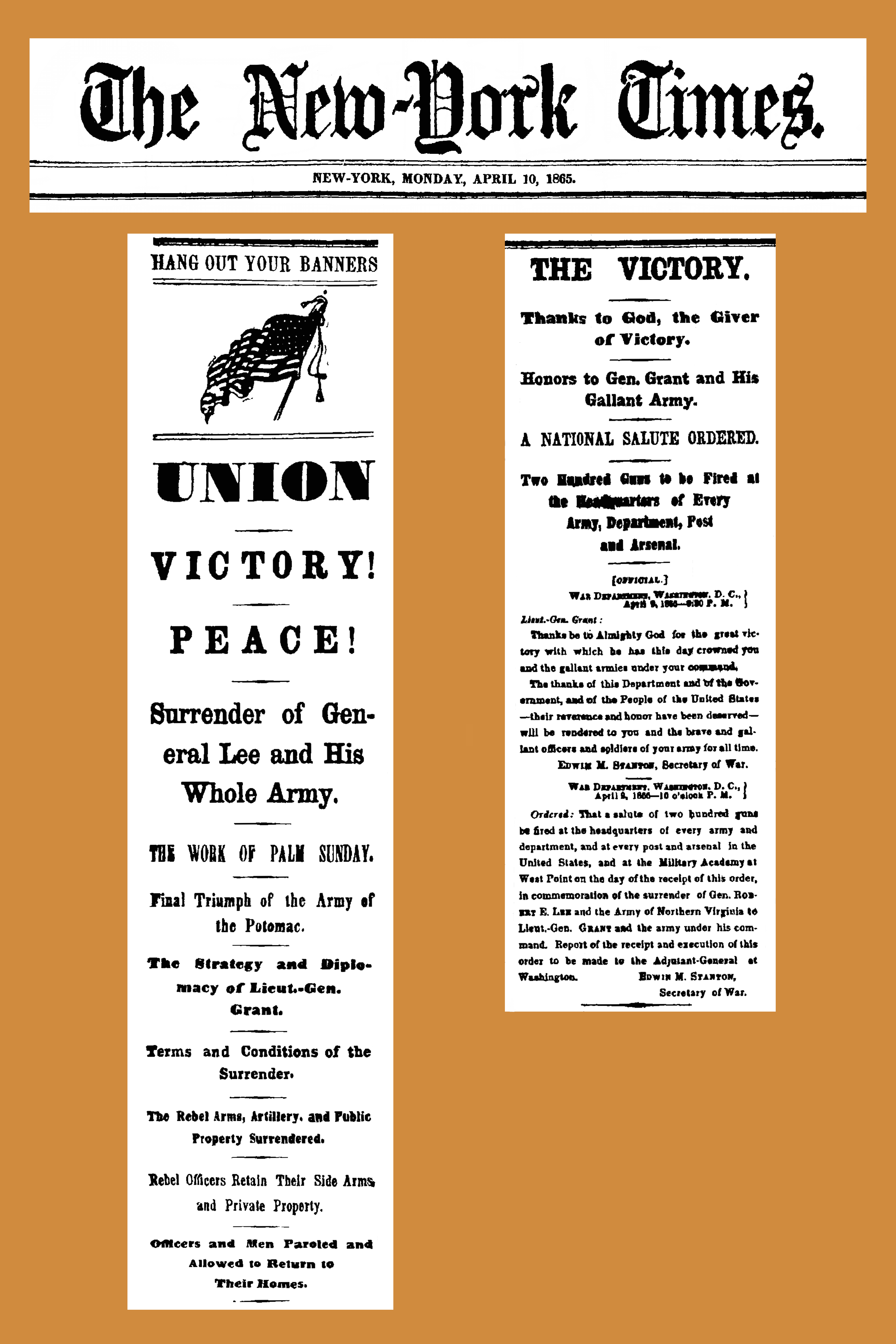
This New York Times front page celebrated Lee's surrender, headlining how Grant let Confederate officers retain their sidearms and "paroled" the Confederate officers and men.

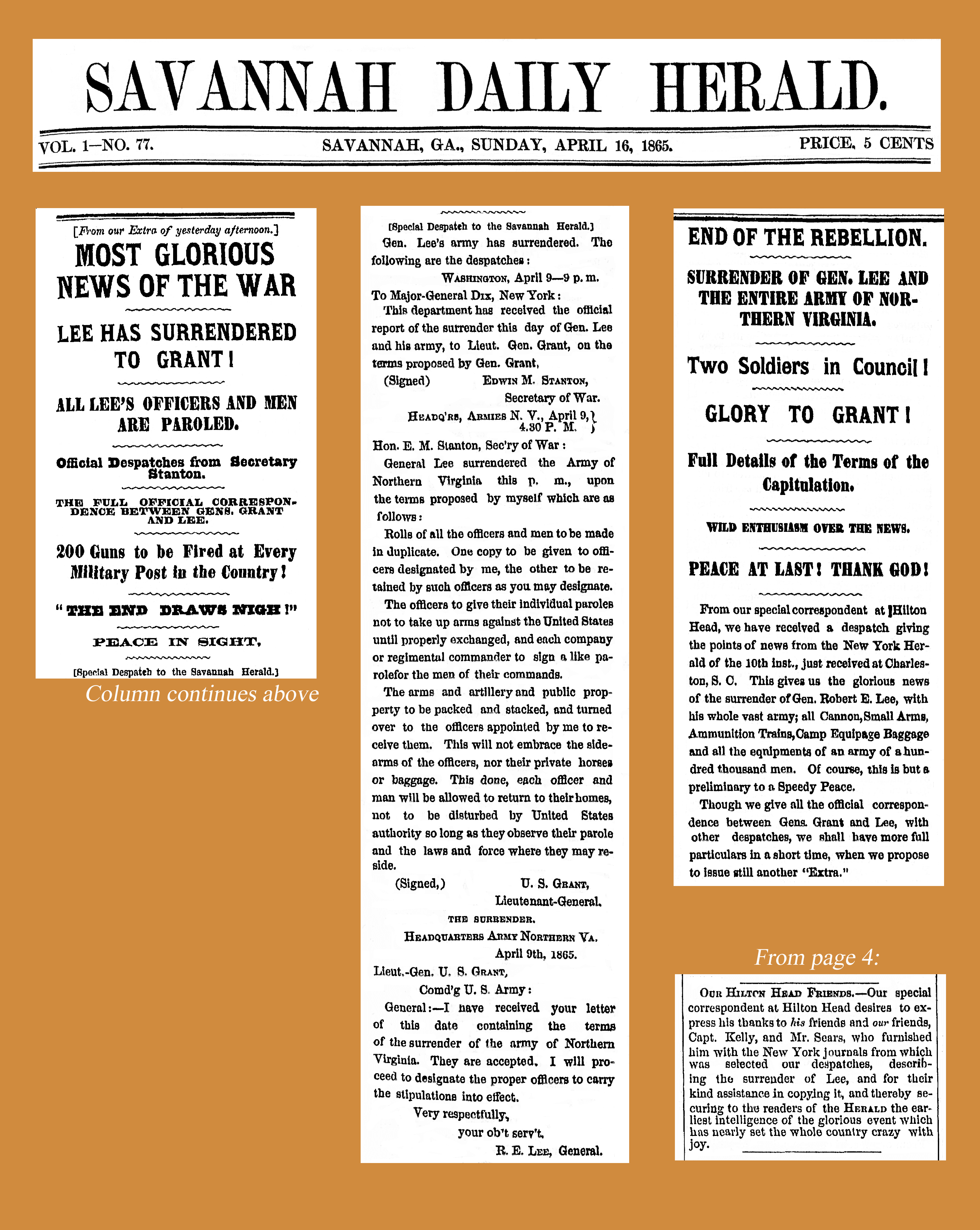
News of Lee's April 9 surrender reached this southern newspaper (Savannah, Georgia) on April 15—after the April 14 shooting of President Lincoln. The article quotes Grant's terms of surrender.

The Battle of Palmito Ranch was fought on May 12–13. The last large Confederate military department, the Trans-Mississippi Department, surrendered on May 26, completing the formalities on June 2. The last surrender on land did not come until June 23, when Cherokee Confederate General Stand Watie gave up his command at Doaksville, Choctaw Nation. At sea, the last Confederate ship, CSS Shenandoah, did not surrender until November 6. It had continued sailing around the world raiding vessels until it finally received news of the end of the war. Shenandoah also fired the last shots of the war on June 22. By April 6, 1866, the rebellion was declared over in all states but Texas. Finally, on August 20, 1866, the war was declared legally over, though fighting had been over for more than a year by then.

The end of slavery in the United States of America is closely tied to the end of the Civil War. As the main cause of the war, slavery led to Lincoln's Emancipation Proclamation, freeing slaves in the Confederacy as Union troops advanced. The last slaves in the Confederacy were not freed until June 19, 1865, now celebrated as the national holiday Juneteenth. After the end of hostilities, the war-torn nation then entered the Reconstruction era in a partially successful attempt to rebuild the country and grant civil rights to freed slaves.

== April ==
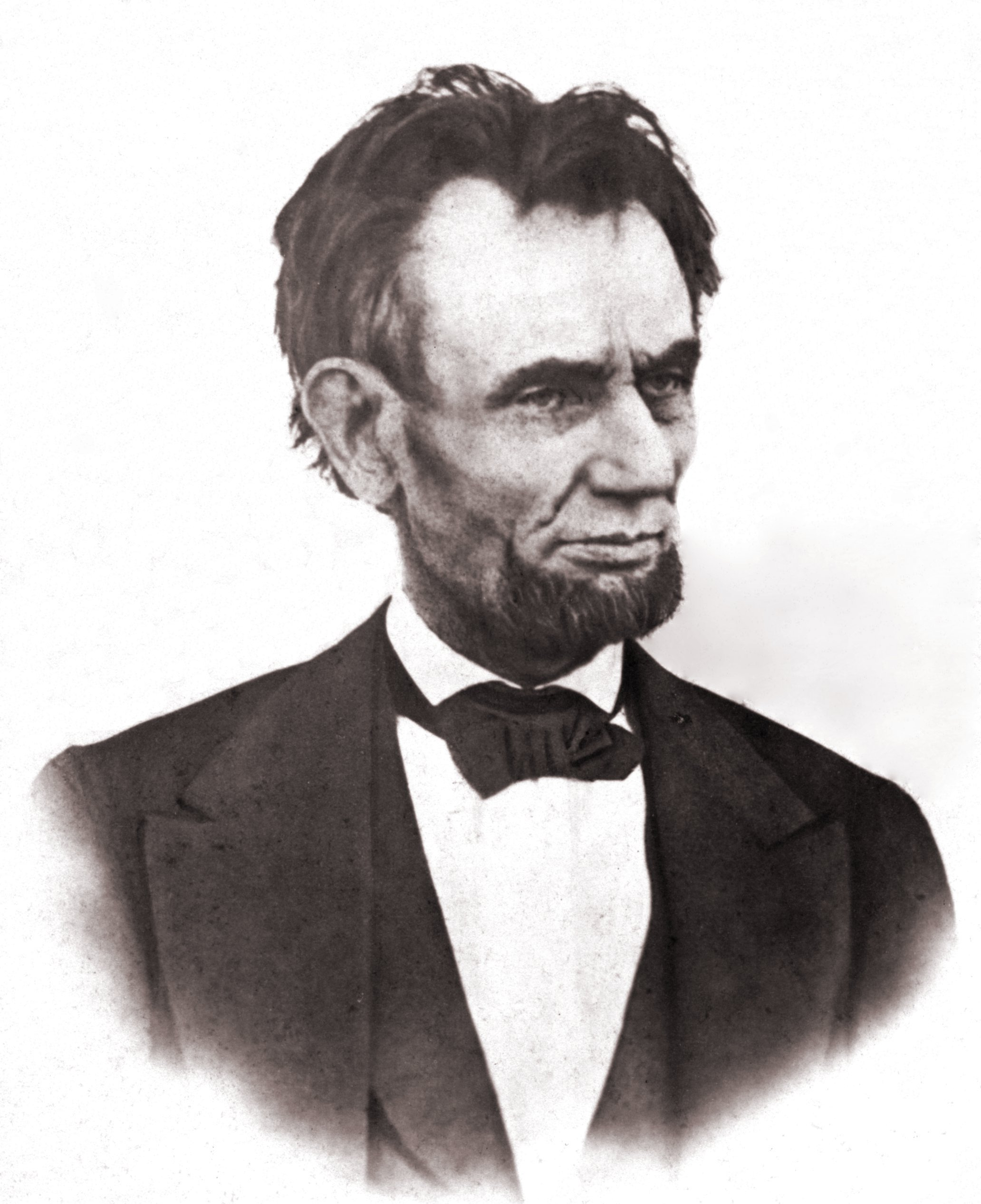
The last known high-quality image of Lincoln, taken on the balcony at the White House, March 6, 1865

Although President Abraham Lincoln lived to see the effective end of the war, he did not live to see it through to its conclusion. Assassin John Wilkes Booth shot Lincoln on April 14, 1865, and he died the next morning. Lincoln's death was a shock to both North and South. Unaware of Lee's surrender on April 9 and the assassination on April 14, General James H. Wilson's Raiders continued their march through Alabama into Georgia. On April 16, the Battle of Columbus, Georgia was fought. Columbus fell to Wilson's Raiders about midnight on April 16, and most of its manufacturing capacity was destroyed on the 17th. Confederate Colonel John Stith Pemberton, the inventor of Coca-Cola, was wounded in this battle, which resulted in his obsession with pain-killing formulas, ultimately ending in the recipe for his celebrated drink.

The first major stage in the peacemaking process was Lee's surrender at Appomattox on April 9, 1865. This, coupled with Lincoln's assassination, induced Johnston to act, believing: "With such odds against us, without the means of procuring ammunition or repairing arms, without money or credit to provide food, it was impossible to continue the war except as robbers." On April 17 Sherman and Johnston met at Bennett Place, and the following day an armistice was arranged, with terms discussed and agreed upon. Grant had authorized the surrender only of Johnston's forces, but Sherman exceeded his orders by providing very generous terms. These included that the rebel states be immediately recognized after their leaders signed loyalty oaths; that property and personal rights be returned to the Confederates; the reestablishment of the federal court system; and that a general amnesty be given. On April 24, authorities in Washington rejected Sherman's proposed terms; two days later, Johnston agreed to the same terms Lee had received previously on April 9.

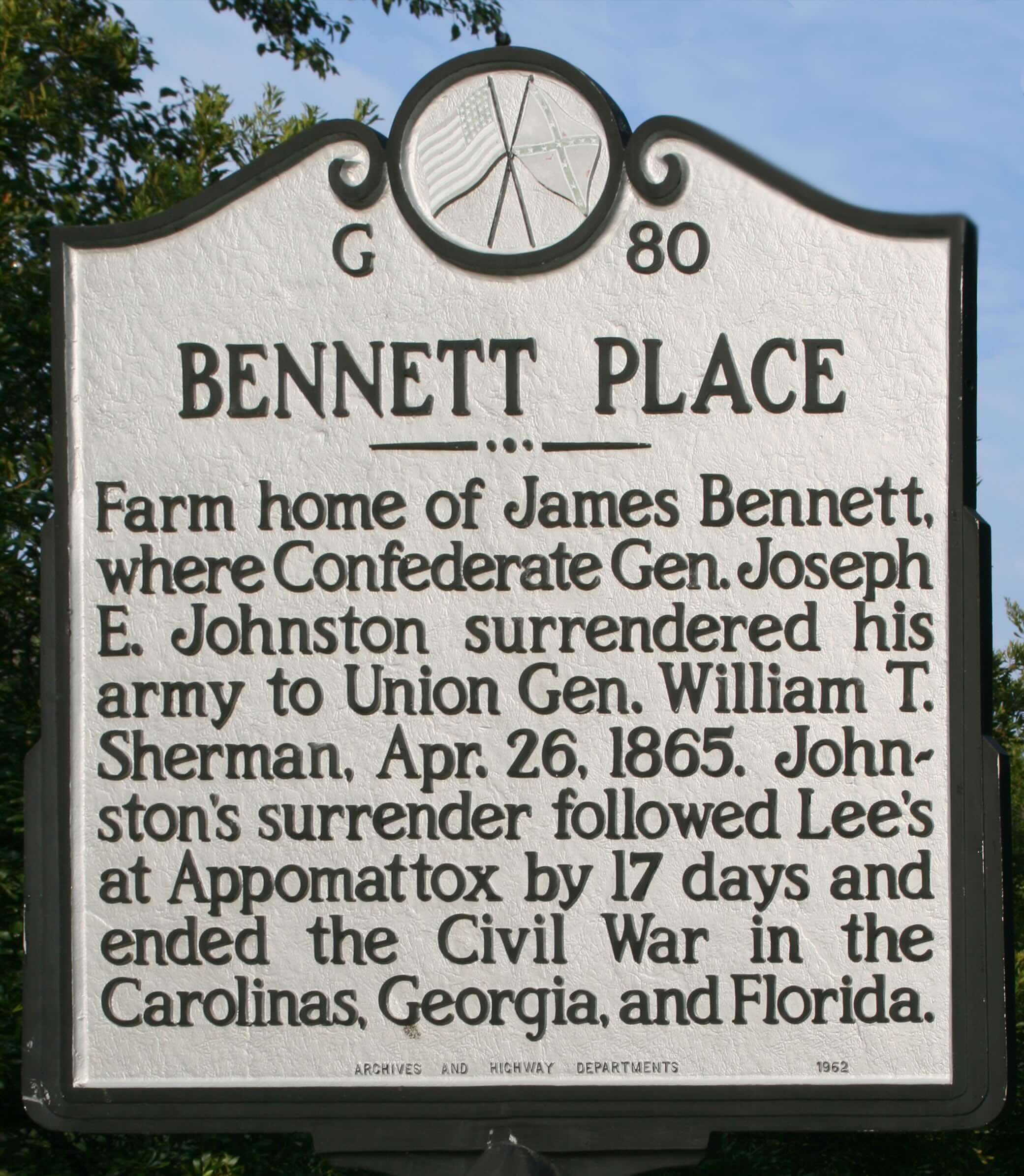
Bennett Place marker

The next major stage in the peace-making process concluding the American Civil War was the surrender of General Joseph E. Johnston and his armies to Major General William T. Sherman on April 26, 1865, at Bennett Place, in Durham, North Carolina. Johnston's Army of Tennessee was among nearly one hundred thousand Confederate soldiers who were surrendered from North Carolina, South Carolina, Georgia, and Florida. The conditions of surrender were in a document called "Terms of a Military Convention" signed by Sherman, Johnston, and Lieutenant General Ulysses S. Grant at Raleigh, North Carolina.

General Johnston surrendered the following commands under his direction: the Department of Tennessee and Georgia; the Army of Tennessee; the Department of South Carolina, Georgia, and Florida; and the Department of North Carolina and Southern Virginia. In doing so, Johnston surrendered to Sherman around 30,000 men. On April 27 his adjutant announced the terms to the Army of Tennessee in General Orders #18, and on May 2 he issued his farewell address to the Army of Tennessee as General Orders #22. The remaining parts of the Florida "Brigade of the West" surrendered with the rest of Johnston's forces on May 4, 1865, at Greensboro, North Carolina.

On May 4, 1865, Union Maj. Gen. Henry Halleck proposed "to issue an order that all armed men in Virginia who do not surrender by a certain date shall be held as outlaws and robbers." This was approved by Lt. Gen. Ulysses S. Grant and Secretary of War Edwin M. Stanton and Halleck issued General Orders No. 6, Military Division of the James, on May 6, 1865, effective from May 20, 1865. The order stated that "all persons found in arms against the authority of the United States in the State of Virginia and North Carolina, will be treated as outlaws and robbers."

== May and June ==
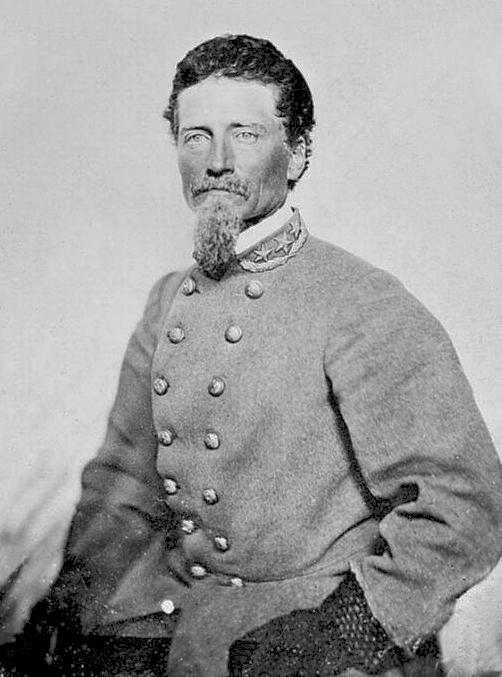
Dabney Maury

Confederate President Jefferson Davis fled Richmond, Virginia, following its evacuation in the early part of April 1865. On May 5, 1865, in Washington, Georgia, Davis had held the last meeting of his Cabinet. At that time, the Confederate government was declared dissolved. The meeting took place at the Heard house, the Georgia Branch Bank Building, with 14 officials present. Despite the fact that there were still small pockets of resistance in the South, the president declared that the armed resistance was "virtually" ended and that nations or ships still harboring fugitives would be denied entry into U.S. ports. Persons found aboard such vessels would no longer be given immunity from prosecution of their crimes. Premised on the surrender of all Confederate Armies east of the Mississippi River, on May 11, 1865, Gen. Grant issued General Orders No. 90 from the War Department stating "That from and after the first day of June, 1865, any and all persons found in arms against the United States, or who may commit acts of hostility against it east of the Mississippi River, will be regarded as guerrillas and punished with death." The Battle of Palmito Ranch was fought on May 12 and 13.

=== Camp Napoleon Council (May 26, 1865) ===
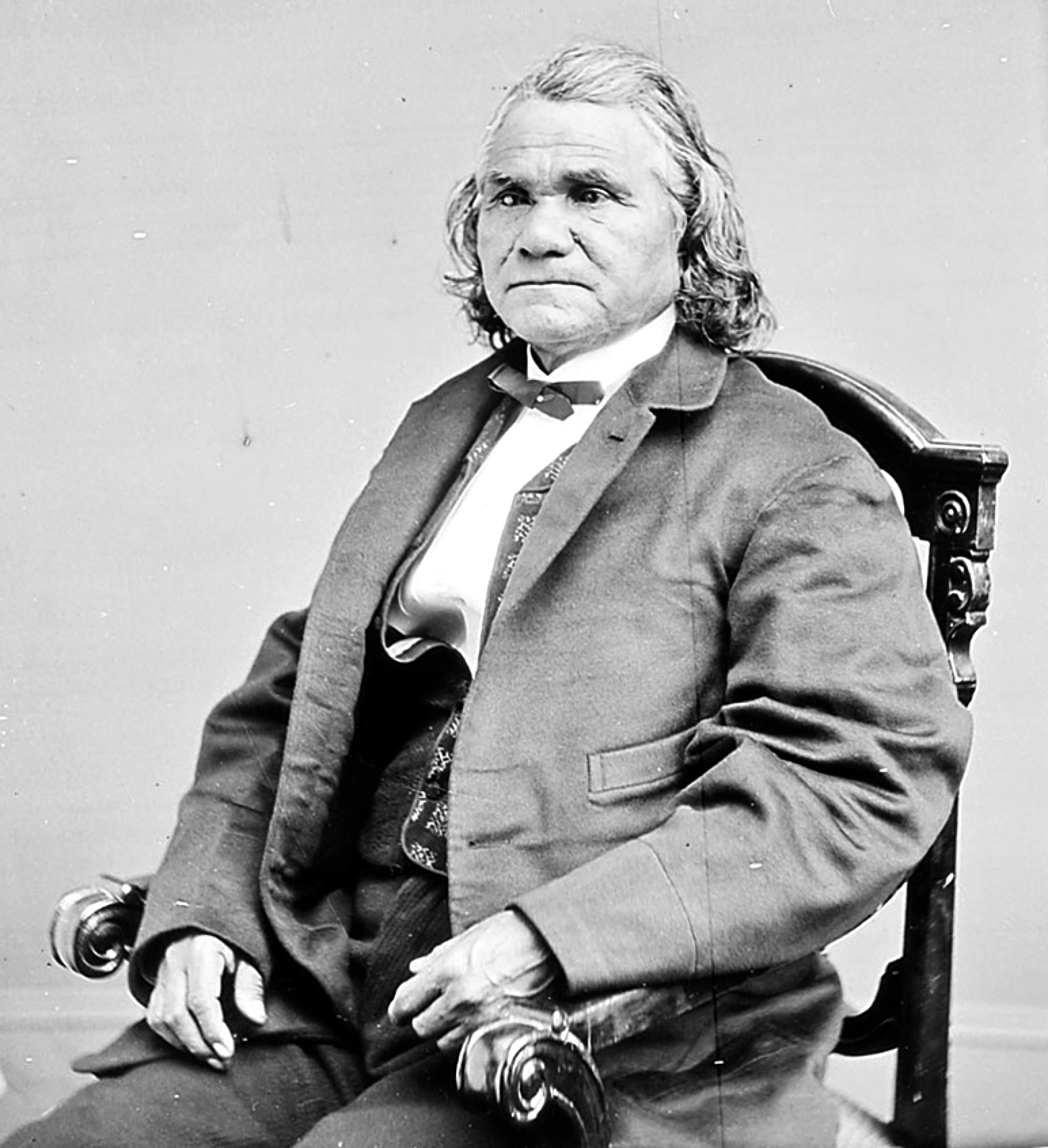
Stand Watie

The Native American tribes of the Indian Territory realized that the Confederacy could no longer fulfill its commitments to them. Therefore, the Camp Napoleon Council was called to draft an agreement to present a united front as they negotiated a return of their loyalty to the United States. Native American tribes further west, many of them also at war with the U.S. Army, were also invited to take part, and several of them did.

At the end of the meeting, on May 26, 1865, the council appointed commissioners (no more than five for each tribe) to attend a conference with the U.S. government in Washington, D.C., at which the results of the Camp Napoleon Council would be presented and discussed. However, the U.S. government refused to meet with such a large group representing so many tribes. Furthermore, the government regarded the Camp Napoleon meeting as unofficial and unauthorized. President Johnson later called for a meeting at Fort Smith (called the Fort Smith Council), which was held in September, 1865.

=== Trans-Mississippi Department ===
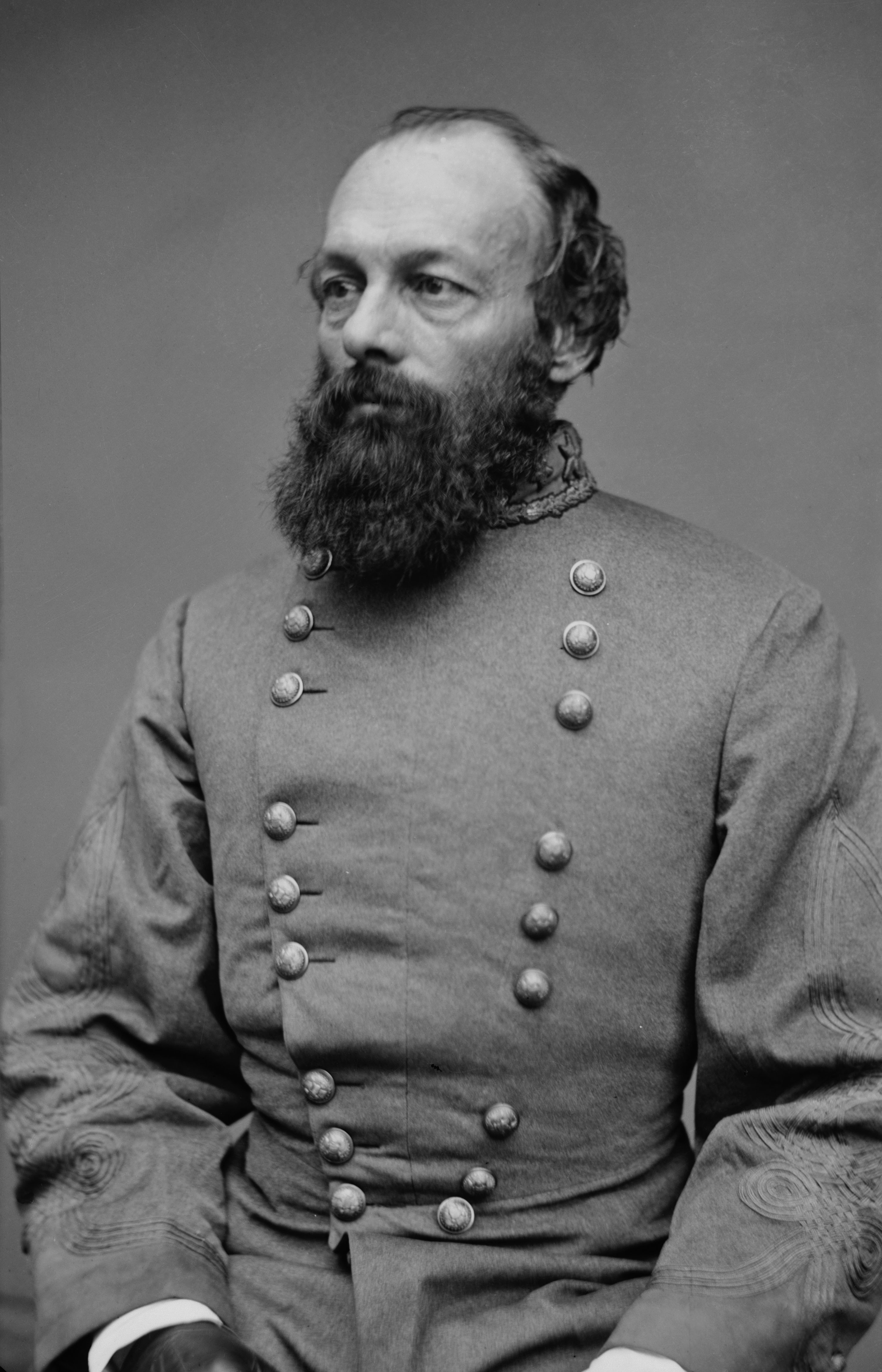
Kirby Smith

Confederate leaders asked General Kirby Smith to send reinforcements from his Army of the Trans-Mississippi to east of the Mississippi River in the spring of 1864 following the Battle of Mansfield and the Battle of Pleasant Hill. This was not practical due to the Union naval control of the Mississippi River and the unwillingness of western troops to be transferred east of the river. Smith instead dispatched Major General Sterling Price and his cavalry on an invasion of Missouri that was ultimately not successful. Thereafter the war west of the Mississippi River was principally one of small raids.

By May 26, 1865, a representative of Smith's negotiated and signed surrender documents with a representative of Major General Edward Canby in Shreveport, Louisiana, then took custody of Smith's force of 43,000 soldiers when they surrendered, by then the only significant Confederate forces left west of the Mississippi River. With this ended all organized Southern military resistance to the Union forces. Smith signed the surrender papers on June 2 on board USS Fort Jackson just outside Galveston Harbor.

In view of the surrender of the Confederate Trans-Mississippi Department to Maj. Gen. Canby on May 26, 1865, Brig. Gen. Cyrus Bussey issued General Orders No. 24 from Headquarters Third Div., 7th Army Corps, Fort Smith, Ark., June 2, 1865, stating that "All such persons who remain in arms engaged in acts of hostility to the United States after a reasonable time to be informed of their surrender, will be regarded as guerrillas and outlaws, and when arrested will be shot."

=== Events of late June ===
Ending slavery had become a key goal of the Union after Lincoln issued the Emancipation Proclamation on January 1, 1863. The Emancipation Proclamation declared free all slaves in states in rebellion, but slaves actually gained their freedom as Union troops took Confederate territory. While slaves in much of the eastern Confederacy had already been freed by Union incursion, many of the further reaches of the Confederacy had not been touched by war, including much of Texas. On June 19, 1865, Union General Gordon Granger gave General Order No. 3, declaring all slaves in Texas to be free. While practically the order took some time to spread and enforce, its date of enactment was momentous, marking the legal end of slavery in the Confederacy. This is now celebrated as the national holiday Juneteenth. The full end of slavery in the United States did not come until December 6, with the ratification of the Thirteenth Amendment to the United States Constitution. In Native American territories that had sided with the Confederacy, slavery did not end until 1866.

On June 19, 1865, Maj. Gen. Gordon Granger issued General Orders No. 4, Headquarters District of Texas, Galveston, Tex., stating that "All lawless persons committing acts of violence, such as banditti, guerrillas, jayhawkers, horse-thieves, &c. are hereby declared outlaws and enemies of the human race, and will be dealt with accordingly." President Andrew Johnson issued three proclamations in 1865 and 1866 that formally declared the end of the rebellion in different parts of the former Confederacy. The first, issued on June 13, 1865, declared the rebellion fully suppressed only within the state of Tennessee, Johnson's home state where he had been military governor.

And I hereby also proclaim and declare that the insurrection, so far as it relates to, and within the State of Tennessee, and the inhabitants of the said State of Tennessee as reorganized and constituted under their recently adopted constitution and reorganization, and accepted by them, is suppressed, and therefore, also, that all the disabilities and disqualifications attaching to said State and the inhabitants thereof consequent upon any proclamations issued by virtue of the fifth section of the act entitled "An act further to provide for the collection of duties on imports, and for other purposes," approved the thirteenth day of July, one thousand eight hundred and sixty-one, are removed.

== End of the war ==
=== CSS Shenandoah ===
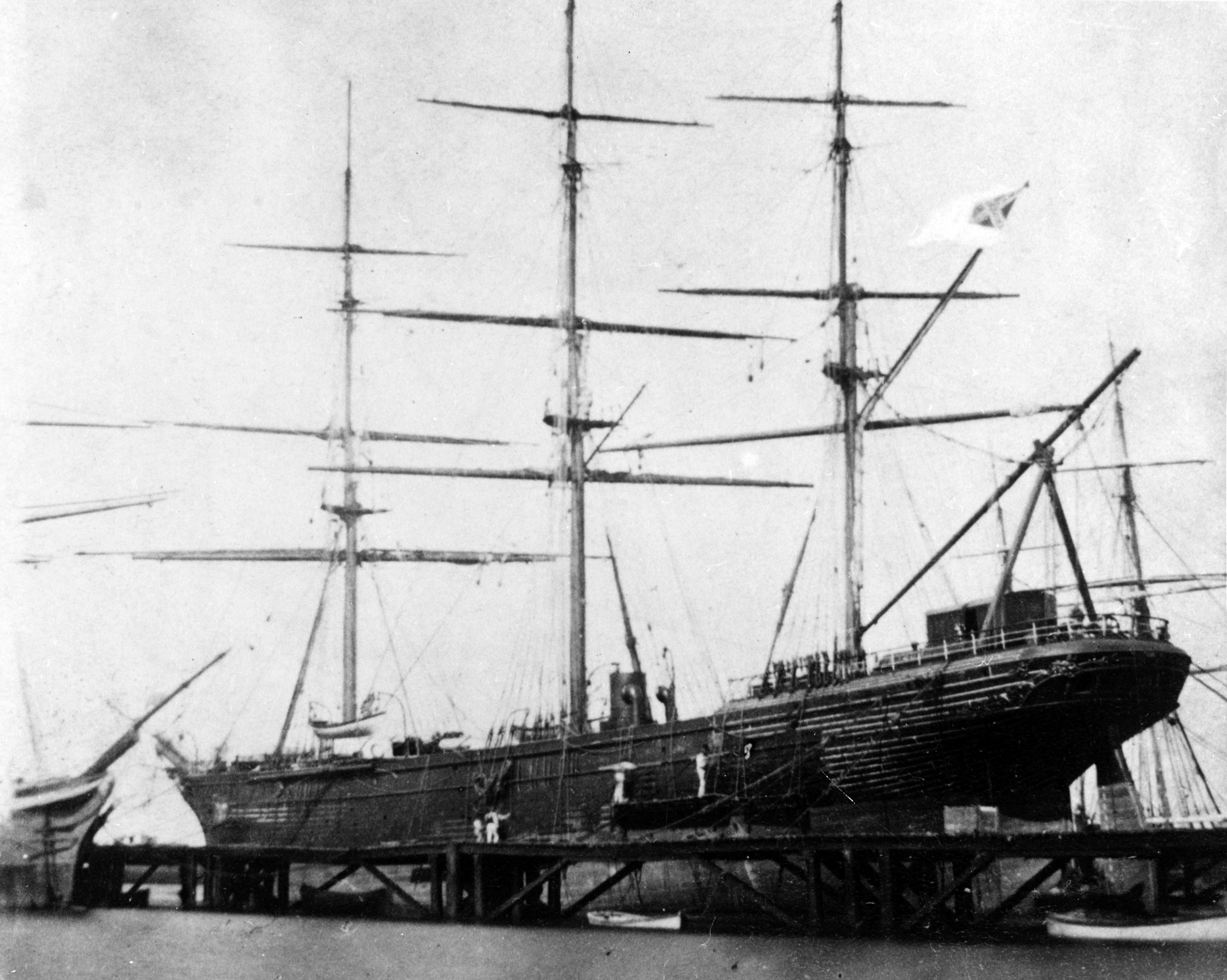
CSS Shenandoah

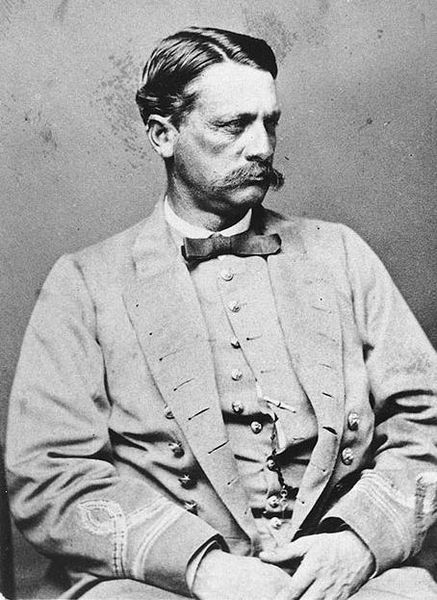
James Waddell

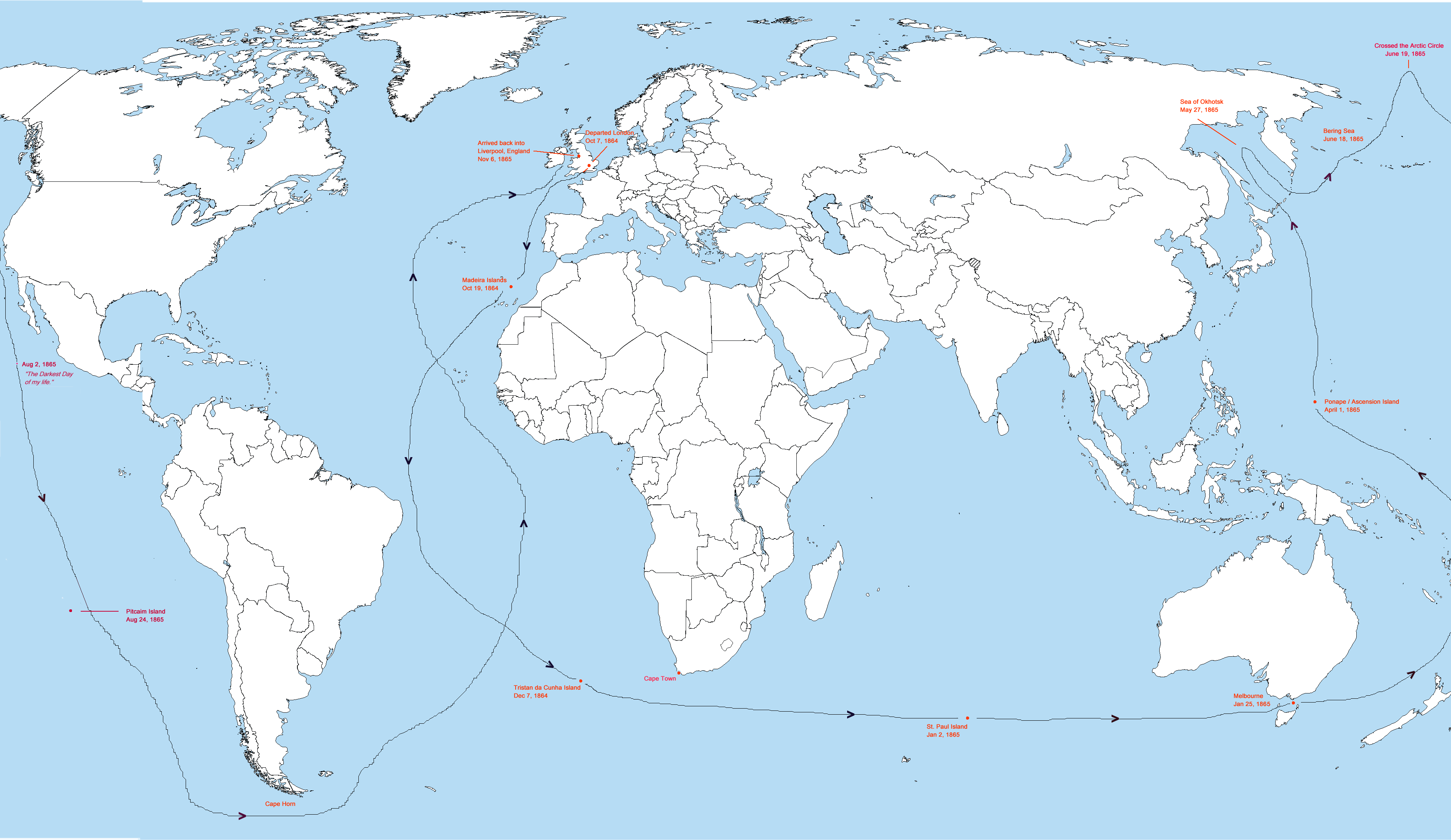
World route of CSS Shenandoah

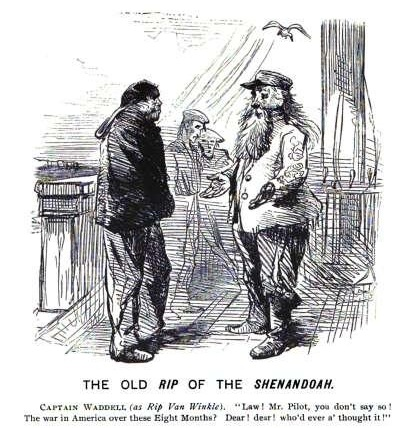
Editorial cartoon satirizing James Waddell still engaging in combat after the Civil War was regarded over

CSS Shenandoah was commissioned as a commerce raider by the Confederacy to interfere with Union shipping and hinder their efforts in the American Civil War. A Scottish-built merchant ship originally called the Sea King, it was secretly purchased by Confederate agents in September 1864. Captain James Waddell renamed the ship Shenandoah after she was converted to a warship off the coast of Spain on October 19, shortly after leaving England. William Conway Whittle, Waddell's right-hand man, was the ship's executive officer.

Shenandoah, sailing south then east across the Indian Ocean and into the South Pacific, was in Micronesia at the Island of Ponape (called Ascension Island by Whittle) at the time of the surrender of Lee's Army of Northern Virginia to the Union forces on April 9, 1865. Waddell had already captured and disposed of thirteen Union merchantmen.

Shenandoah destroyed one more prize in the Sea of Okhotsk, north of Japan, then continued to the Aleutians and into the Bering Sea and Arctic Ocean, crossing the Arctic Circle on June 19. Continuing then south along the coast of Alaska Shenandoah came upon a fleet of Union ships whaling on June 22. She opened continuous fire, destroying a major portion of the Union whaling fleet. Capt. Waddell took aim at a fleeing whaler, Sophia Thornton, and at his signal, the gunner jerked a wrist strap and fired the last two shots of the American Civil War. Shenandoah had so far captured and burned eleven ships of the American whaling fleet while in Arctic waters.

Waddell finally learned of Lee's surrender on June 27 when the captain of the prize Susan & Abigail produced a newspaper from San Francisco. The same paper contained Confederate President Jefferson Davis's proclamation that the "war would be carried on with re-newed vigor". Shenandoah proceeded to capture a further ten whalers in the following seven hours. Waddell then steered Shenandoah south, intending to raid the port of San Francisco which he believed to be poorly defended. En route they encountered an English barque, Barracouta, on August 2 from which Waddell learned of the final collapse of the Confederacy including the surrenders of Johnston's, Kirby Smith's, and Magruder's armies and the capture of President Davis. The long log entry of Shenandoah for August 2, 1865, begins "The darkest day of my life." Captain Waddell realized then in his grief that they had taken innocent unarmed Union whaling ships as prizes when the rest of the country had ended hostilities.

Waddell immediately converted the warship back to a merchant ship, storing her cannon below, and repainting the hull. At this point, Waddell decided to sail back to England and surrender Shenandoah. Surrendering in an American port carried the certainty of facing a court with a Union point of view and the very real risk of a trial for piracy, for which he and the crew could be hanged. Sailing south around Cape Horn and staying well off shore to avoid shipping that might report Shenandoah's position, they saw no land for another 9,000 miles until they arrived back in England, having logged a total of over 58,000 miles around the world in a year's travel—the only Confederate ship to circumnavigate the globe.

The last Confederate surrender did not occur until November 6, 1865, when the ship under Capt. Waddell's command surrendered at Liverpool to Capt. R. N. Paynter, commander of HMS Donegal of the British Royal Navy. Shenandoah was officially surrendered by letter to the British Prime Minister, the Earl Russell. Shenandoah was sold to Sultan Majid bin Said of Zanzibar in 1866 and renamed El Majidi.

=== Proclamations ===
On April 6, 1866, Johnson issued a second proclamation that formally ended the rebellion in Alabama, Arkansas, Florida, Georgia, Louisiana, Mississippi, North Carolina, South Carolina, and Virginia (as well as proclaiming it ended, rather than merely "suppressed," in Tennessee). Only Texas, where pockets of resistance remained, was excluded.

Now, therefore, I, Andrew Johnson, President of the United States, do hereby proclaim and declare that the insurrection which heretofore existed in the States of Georgia, South Carolina, Virginia, North Carolina, Tennessee, Alabama, Louisiana, Arkansas, Mississippi, and Florida is at an end and is henceforth to be so regarded.

The formal end of the war came on August 20, 1866, when Johnson signed a Proclamation – Declaring that Peace, Order, Tranquillity, and Civil Authority Now Exists in and Throughout the Whole of the United States of America. It noted that his April proclamation had declared "that there no longer existed any armed resistance of misguided citizens or others to the authority of the United States in any or in all the States before mentioned, excepting only the State of Texas."

Whereas subsequently to the said 2d day of April, 1866, the insurrection in the State of Texas has been completely and everywhere suppressed and ended and the authority of the United States has been successfully and completely established in the said State of Texas and now remains therein unresisted and undisputed...

Whereas all the reasons and conclusions set forth in regard to the several States therein specially named now apply equally and in all respects to the State of Texas, as well as to the other States which had been involved in insurrection...

Now, therefore, I, Andrew Johnson, President of the United States, do hereby proclaim and declare that the insurrection which heretofore existed in the State of Texas is at an end and is to be henceforth so regarded in that State as in the other States before named in which the said insurrection was proclaimed to be at an end by the aforesaid proclamation of the 2d day of April, 1866.

And I do further proclaim that the said insurrection is at an end and that peace, order, tranquillity, and civil authority now exist in and throughout the whole of the United States of America.

This final date, August 20, 1866, was adopted as the legal end of the Civil War by United States courts, departments, and agencies, as well as Congress. An 1867 act of Congress extended soldiers' wartime rates of pay "for three years from and after the close of the rebellion, as announced by the President of the United States by proclamation, bearing date the twentieth day of August, eighteen hundred and sixty-six." The Supreme Court also cited August 20, 1866 as the war's official end in Anderson v. United States.

== See also ==
- Celebrations at the end of the American Civil War
- Military forces of the Confederate States
- Origins of the American Civil War
- Raising the Flag at Fort Sumter
- Turning point of the American Civil War

== Sources ==
- Baldwin, John, Last Flag Down: The Epic Journey of the Last Confederate Warship, Crown Publishers, 2007, ISBN 5-557-76085-7, Random House, Inc., 2007, ISBN 0-7393-2718-6
- Ballard, Michael B., A Long Shadow: Jefferson Davis and the Final Days of the Confederacy, University of Georgia Press, 1997, ISBN 0-8203-1941-4
- Beringer, Richard E., Why the South Lost the Civil War, University of Georgia Press, 1991, ISBN 0-8203-1396-3
- Bradley, Mark L., This Astounding Close: The Road to Bennett Place, UNC Press, 2000, ISBN 0-8078-2565-4
- Catton, Bruce (1990) [1953]. A Stillness at Appomattox. Doubleday. ISBN 0-385-04451-8. LCCN 53-9982.
- Comtois, Pierre, "War's Last Battle." America's Civil War, July 1992 (Vol. 5, No. 2)
- Cotham, Edward Terrel, Battle on the Bay: The Civil War Struggle for Galveston, University of Texas Press, 1998, ISBN 0-292-71205-7
- Cutting, Elisabeth, Jefferson Davis – Political Soldier, Read Books, 2007, ISBN 1-4067-2337-1
- Davis, Burke, The Civil War: Strange & Fascinating Facts, Wings Books, 1960 & 1982, ISBN 0-517-37151-0
- Davis, Burke, To Appomattox – Nine April Days, 1865, Eastern Acorn Press, 1992, ISBN 0-915992-17-5
- Eicher, David J., The Longest Night: A Military History of the Civil War, Simon & Schuster, 2001, ISBN 0-684-84944-5.
- Eicher, John H. and Eicher, David J., Civil War High Commands, Stanford University Press, 2001, ISBN 0-8047-3641-3.
- Faust, Drew Gilpin, The Dread Void of Uncertainty": Naming the Dead in the American Civil War, Southern Cultures (magazine) – Volume 11, Number 2, University of North Carolina Press, Summer 2005
- Filbert, Preston, The Half Not Told: The Civil War in a Frontier Town, Stackpole Books, 2001, ISBN 0-8117-1536-1
- Gelbert, Doug, Civil War Sites, Memorials, Museums, and Library Collections: A State-by-state Guidebook to Places Open to the Public, McFarland & Co., 1997, ISBN 0-7864-0319-5
- Harrell, Roger Herman, The 2nd North Carolina Cavalry: Spruill's Regiment in the Civil War, McFarland, 2004, ISBN 0-7864-1777-3
- Heidler, David Stephen, et al., Encyclopedia Of The American Civil War: A Political, Social, and Military History, W. W. Norton & Company, 2002, ISBN 0-393-04758-X
- Hoxie, Frederick E., Encyclopedia of North American Indians: Native American History, Culture, and Life from Paleo-Indians to the Present, Houghton Mifflin Harcourt, 1996, ISBN 0-395-66921-9
- Hunt, Jeffrey William, The Last Battle of the Civil War: Palmetto Ranch, University of Texas Press, 2002, ISBN 0-292-73461-1, back cover
- Johnson, Clint, Pursuit: The Chase, Capture, Persecution, and Surprising Release of Confederate President Jefferson Davis, Kensington Publishing Corp., 2008, ISBN 0-8065-2890-7
- Johnson, Robert Underwood, Battles and Leaders of the Civil War, Yoseloff, 1888
- Katcher, Philip, The Civil War Day by Day: Day by Day, MBI Publishing Company, 2007, ISBN 0-7603-2865-X
- Kennedy, Frances H., The Civil War Battlefield Guide, Houghton Mifflin Company, 1990, ISBN 0-395-52282-X
- Korn, Jerry, Pursuit to Appomattox: The Last Battles, Time-Life Books, 1987, ISBN 0-8094-4788-6
- Markowitz, Harvey, American Indians: Ready Reference, Vol. III, Salem Press, 1995, ISBN 0-89356-760-4
- Marvel, William, "Last Hurrah at Palmetto Ranch." Civil War Times, January 2006 (Vol. XLIV, No. 6)
- McKenna, Robert, The Dictionary of Nautical Literacy, McGraw-Hill Professional, 2003, ISBN 0-07-141950-0
- McPherson, James M. (1988). Battle Cry of Freedom: The Civil War Era. Oxford University Press. ISBN 978-0-19-503863-7.
- Morris, John Wesley, Ghost Towns of Oklahoma, University of Oklahoma Press, 1977, ISBN 0-8061-1420-7
- Schooler, Lynn, The Last Shot, HarperCollins, 2006, ISBN 0-06-052334-4
- Sheehan-Dean, Aaron, Struggle for a Vast Future: The American Civil War, Osprey Publishing, 2007, ISBN 1-84603-213-X
- Silkenat, David, Raising the White Flag: How Surrender Defined the American Civil War. Chapel Hill: University of North Carolina Press, 2019. ISBN 978-1-4696-4972-6.
- Snow, William P., Lee and His Generals, Gramercy Books, 1867, ISBN 0-517-38109-5.
- Sutherland, Jonathan, African Americans at War: An Encyclopedia, ABC-CLIO, 2004, ISBN 1-57607-746-2
- Thomsen, Brian, Blue & Gray at Sea: Naval Memoirs of the Civil War, Macmillan, 2004, ISBN 0-7653-0896-7
- Tidwell, William A., April '65: Confederate Covert Action in the American Civil War, Kent State University Press, 1995, ISBN 0-87338-515-2
- United States War Department, The War of the Rebellion: A compilation of the official records of the Union and Confederate armies, Government Printing Office, 1902
- Van Doren, Charles Lincoln, et al., Webster's Guide to American History: A Chronological, Geographical, and Biographical Survey and Compendium, Merriam-Webster, 1971, ISBN 0-87779-081-7
- Waddell, James Iredell, et al., C.S.S. Shenandoah: The Memoirs of Lieutenant Commanding James I. Waddell, Crown Publishers, 1960, Original from the University of Michigan – digitized Dec 5, 2006
- Wead, Doug, All the Presidents' Children: Triumph and Tragedy in the Lives of America's First Families, Simon and Schuster, 2004, ISBN 0-7434-4633-X
- Weigley, Russel F., A Great Civil War: A Military and Political History, 1861–1865, Indiana University Press, 2000, ISBN 0-253-33738-0
- Wert, Jeffry D., Mosby's Rangers, Simon and Schuster, 1991, ISBN 0-671-74745-2
- Whittle, William Conway, et al., The Voyage of the CSS Shenandoah: A Memorable Cruise, University of Alabama Press, 2005, ISBN 0-8173-1451-2
- Wright, Mike, What They Didn't Teach You about the Civil War, Presido, 1996, ISBN 0-89141-596-3
