= John Burgwin =

19th-century US Army officer

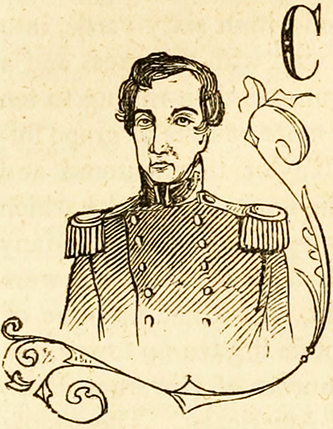
Drawing of John Henry King Burgwin

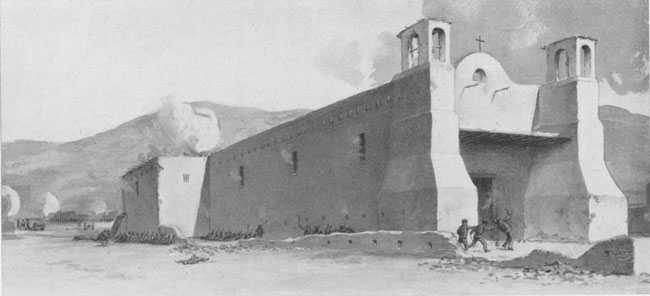
The Battle of Taos in 1847, depicting the death of Captain John H. K. Burgwin (far right) during the siege of Pueblo de Taos.

John Henry King Burgwin (July 1, 1810 – February 7, 1847), was a US Army officer and 1830 graduate of West Point.

J. H. K. Burgwin was born on a plantation in New Hanover County, North Carolina, the eldest son of George William Bush Burgwin and Maria (Nash) Burgwin, a daughter of North Carolina Governor Abner Nash.

He was appointed a Second Lieutenant in 1833 when the US 1st Dragoons (later changed to 1st Cavalry) were established. He then served at Fort Gibson, in what is now Oklahoma, and by 1837 had been promoted to Captain. By early 1847, he was serving under Colonel Sterling Price. Responding to the Taos Revolt, Burgwin moved towards Taos and led a contingent of the US dragoons at the Battle of Embudo Pass on January 29, 1847.

The following day Burgwin joined Col. Price and the combined force marched to Taos where the Mexicans and Natives they were pursuing had retired. He was severely wounded on February 4 during the Siege of Pueblo de Taos and died February 7, 1847.

In 1852 Cantonment Burgwin (often referred to as "Fort Burgwin"), named after Captain Burgwin, was set up 10 miles outside of Taos, and was to remain a US Army outpost until 1860.
