= Cantonment Burgwin =

Former U.S Army fort in the southwestern United States

Coordinates: 36.275°N 105.578°W

Location in the United States
Location in New Mexico

Cantonment Burgwin (also known as Fort Burgwin) was a U.S. Army fort in the southwestern United States, located ten miles (16 km) south of Taos, New Mexico, southeast of Ranchos de Taos.

== History ==
Established 174 years ago in 1852 to protect the Taos Valley from Utes and Jicarilla Apaches, it was named for Captain John H. K. Burgwin in honor of his death in 1847 while fighting at the Siege of Pueblo de Taos, and he was buried there. It was designated a "cantonment" to indicate its temporary character.

Fort Burgwin is known for its role in the Battle of Cieneguilla in 1854, between the 1st Cavalry Regiment and the Jicarilla Apache.

Cantonment Burgwin was abandoned by the U.S. Army in May 1860. Several structures were rebuilt starting in 1957 and continued until 2004, financed initially by Ralph Rounds until his death in 1960. The new structures were known as the Fort Burgwin Research Center.

Later, former Texas governor Bill Clements, Chairman of the Board at Southern Methodist University in Dallas, Texas, added funding for several other buildings on the hill slopes around Fort Burgwin.

== Current status ==
The core buildings are external reconstructions of the original buildings, but the interiors of several of the buildings are modern and serve as offices and classrooms. The site currently serves as the SMU-in-Taos campus, which offers for-credit summer and fall college classes, including the SMU archaeology field school, and the Cultural Institute, which offers weekend informal classes taught by SMU faculty. Previous archaeological work investigating the original fort included the work of Judith Thomas, a historic archaeologist from Mercyhurst University.

== Geography ==
The elevation is approximately 7,400 feet (2,255 m) above sea level.

== See also ==
- Apache Wars
- Fred Wendorf
