= Fayetteville Confederate Cemetery =

Historic cemetery in Washington County, Arkansas

- U.S. National Register of Historic Places
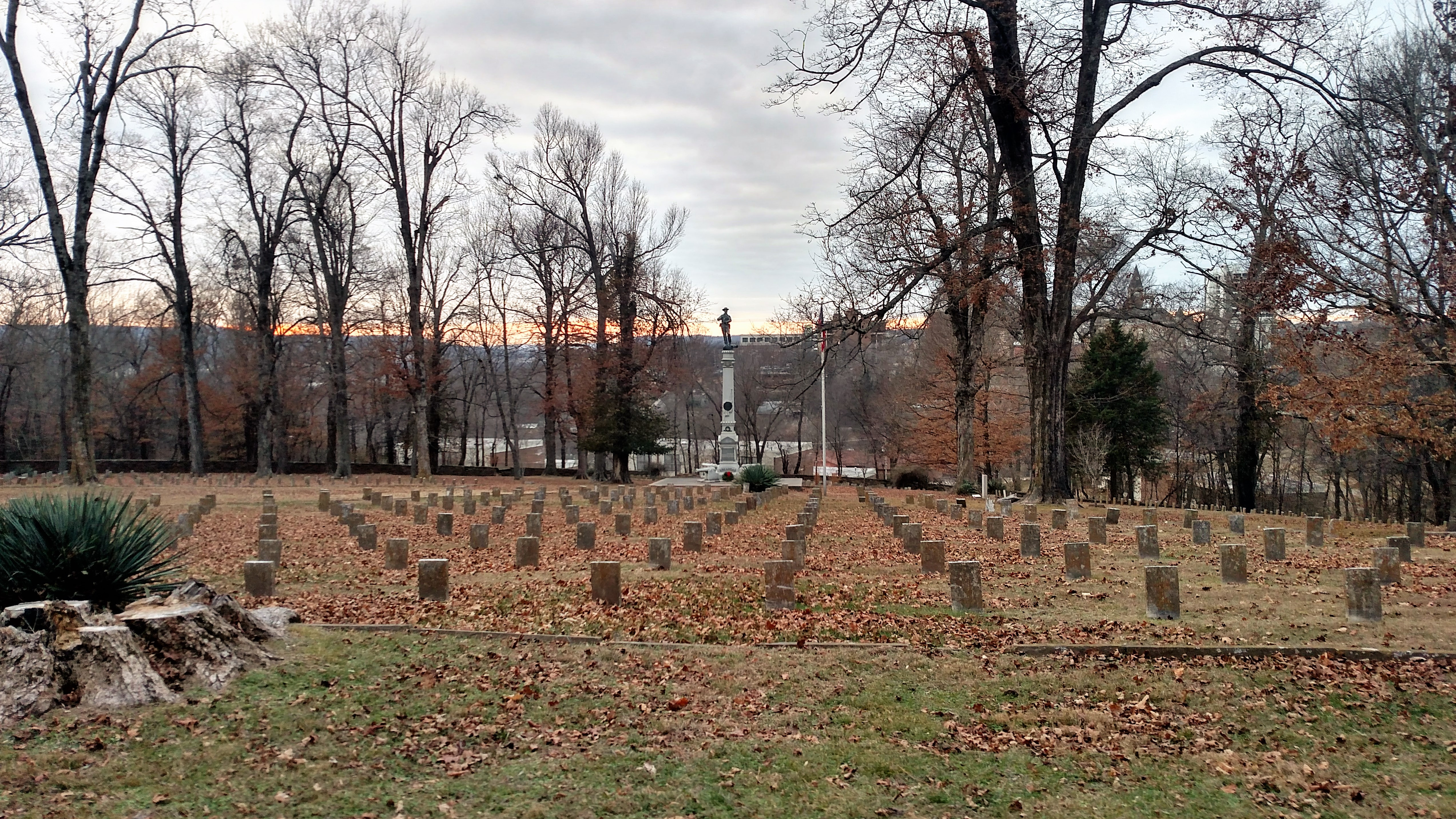

- Location within Arkansas Location within the United States
- Location: Rock St., approximately 800 feet N of jct. with Willow St., Fayetteville, Arkansas
- Coordinates: 36°03′41″N 94°09′10″W
- Area: 3.5 acres (1.4 ha)
- Built: 1873
- Built by: F. H. Venn Company
- NRHP reference No.: 93000481
- Added to NRHP: June 3, 1993

Fayetteville Confederate Cemetery is a cemetery for soldiers of the Confederate States located on the eastern side of Fayetteville in Washington County, Arkansas. Added to the National Register of Historic Places (NRHP) in 1993, the cemetery encompasses 3.5 acres (1.4 ha).

== History ==
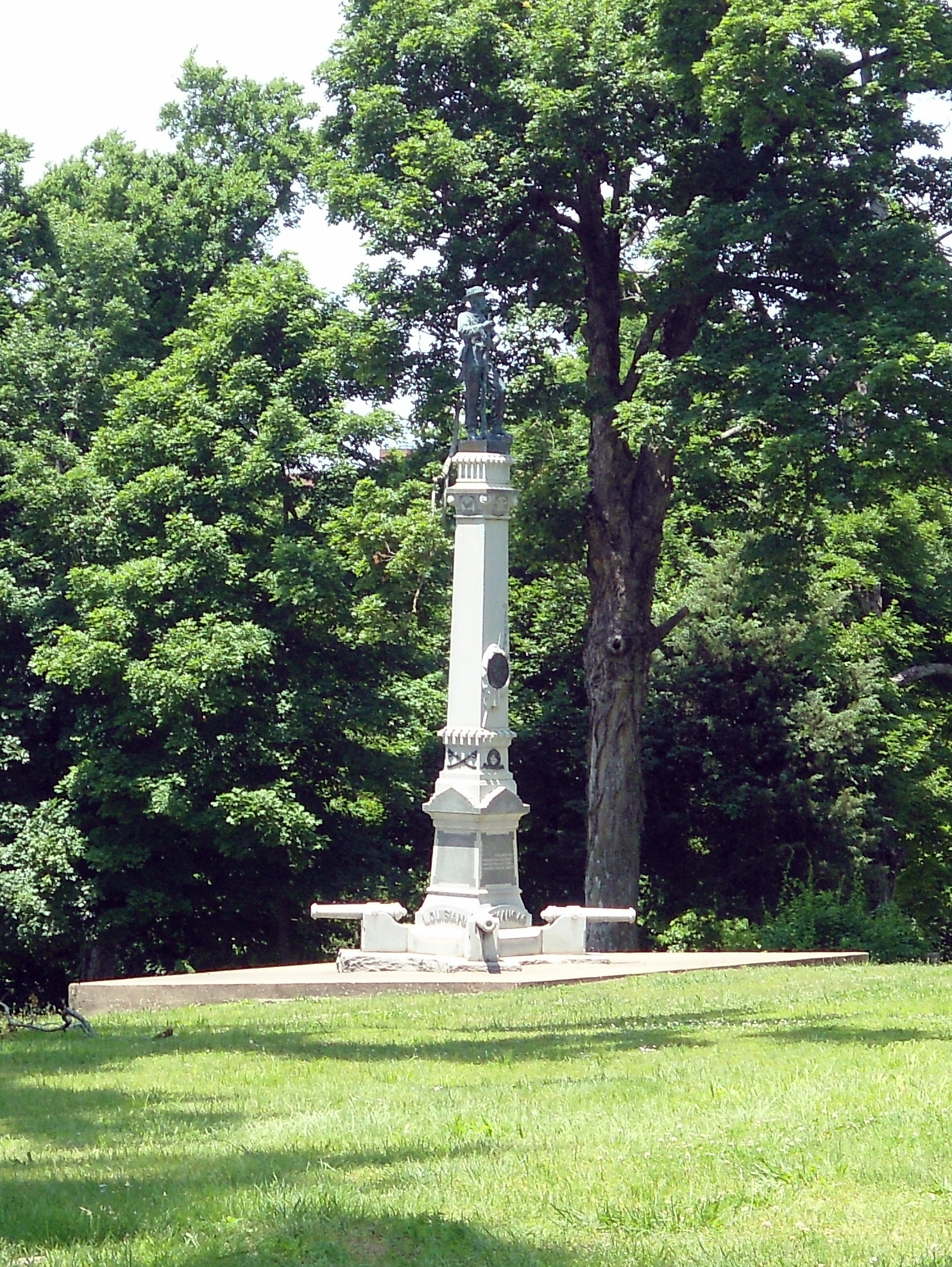
Center monument erected in 1897

Many American Civil War battles were fought in northwest Arkansas, including the Battle of Cane Hill, Battle of Pea Ridge, Battle of Prairie Grove, and many small skirmishes such as the action at Fayetteville. Initially scattered throughout Benton County and Washington County, efforts in 1878 by the Southern Memorial Association of Washington County succeeded in collecting the remains of fallen Confederate soldiers and burying them in the new Confederate cemetery. The Association paid for the remains to be moved and re-interred.

== Design ==
The hundreds of graves are arranged into tree-shaded rows surrounded by an 1885 wall of native stone. The cemetery also offers a view from the hill down onto Fayetteville. A monument was constructed around 1898 at the center of the cemetery.

== See also ==
- Fayetteville National Cemetery
- National Register of Historic Places listings in Washington County, Arkansas
