= Battle of Embudo Pass =

1847 battle of the Mexican-American War

Coordinates: 36.20°N 105.90°W

- Part of the Taos Revolt, Mexican–American War
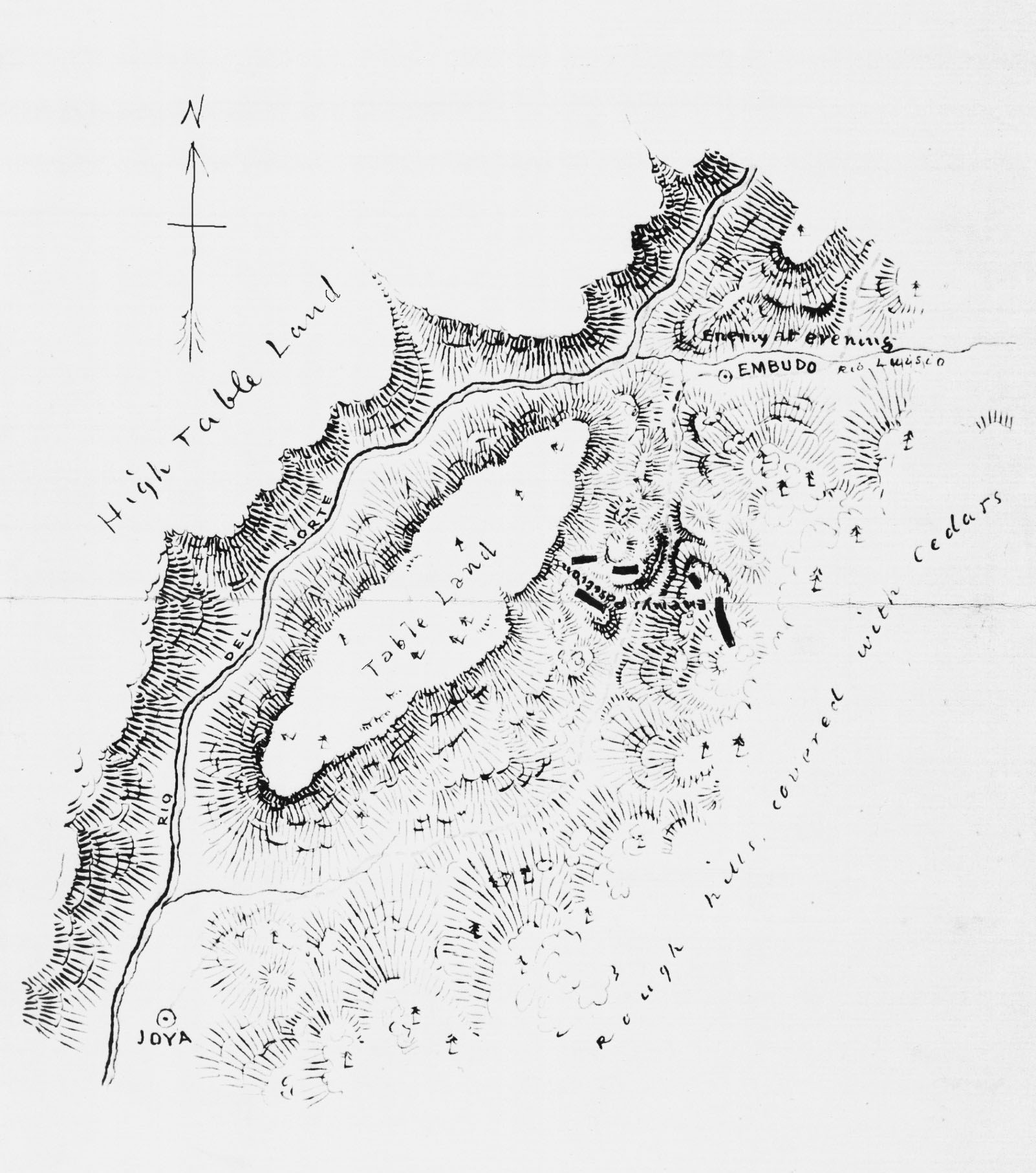
- Sketch of battle site by United States Army Corps of Engineers cartographer JG Bruff.
Date	January 29, 1847
Location	near Dixon, New Mexico
Result	United States victory

Belligerents
United States	Mexico

Commanders and leaders
(United States) Sterling Price (United States) John Burgwin (United States) Ceran St. Vrain	(Mexico) Unknown

Strength
180	600–700

Casualties and losses
1 killed 1 wounded	20 killed 60 wounded

The Battle of Embudo Pass was part of the Taos Revolt, a popular insurrection against the American army's occupation of northern New Mexico. It took place on January 29, 1847, during the Mexican–American War, in what now is New Mexico.

== Background ==
Following the Battle of Cañada, Sterling Price on 27 Jan. advanced up the Rio del Norte (Rio Grande), to Luceros where he was joined by Capt. Burgwin's Company, 1st Dragoons, Lt. Boone's Company A, 2d Regiment Missouri Mounted Volunteers, and Lt. Wilson's 1st Dragoons, bringing Price's force to 479 men. On 29 Jan., Price marched to La Joya, where sixty to eighty insurgents were posted on either side of the canyon. Finding the road by Embudo impractical for artillery or wagons, Price detached three companies under Captain John H.K. Burgwin, Captain Ceran St. Vrain and Lieutenant B.F. White, amounting to 180 men.

== Battle ==
Capt. Burgwin discovered the insurgents at El Embudo, near present-day Dixon, New Mexico, in the thick brush on each side of the road where the gorge becomes constricted.

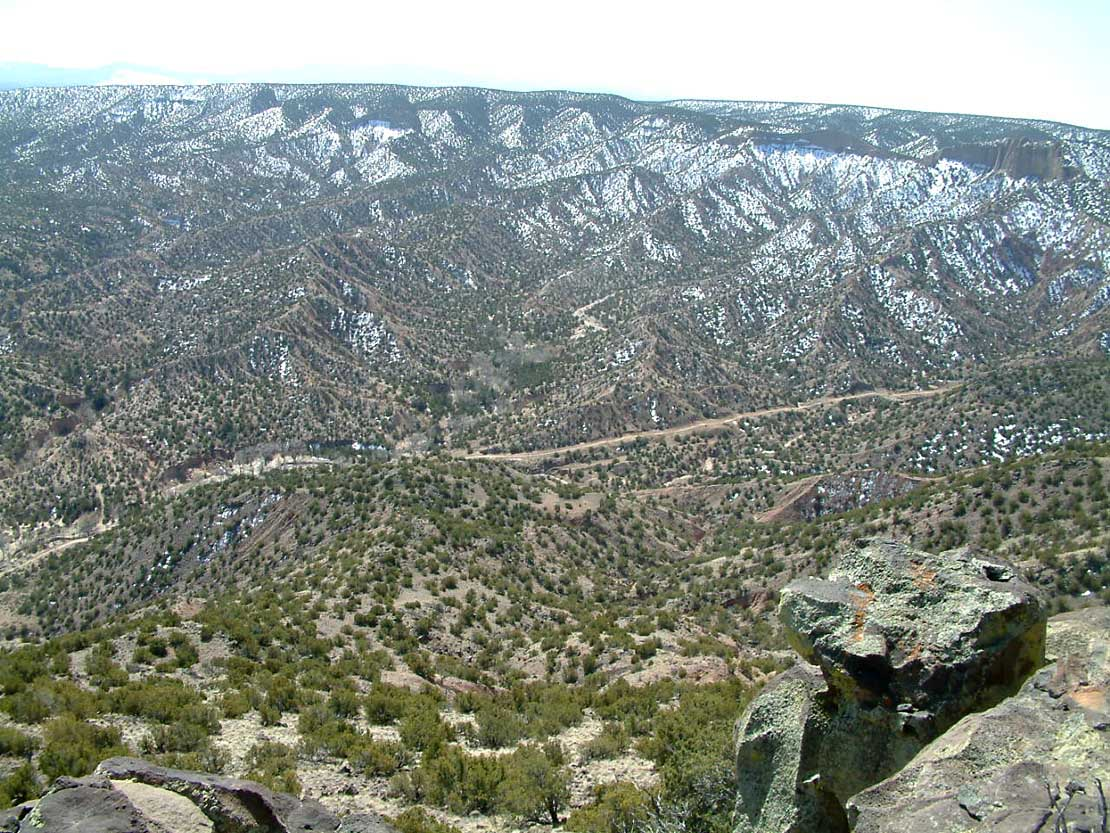
Embudo Pass, 2010

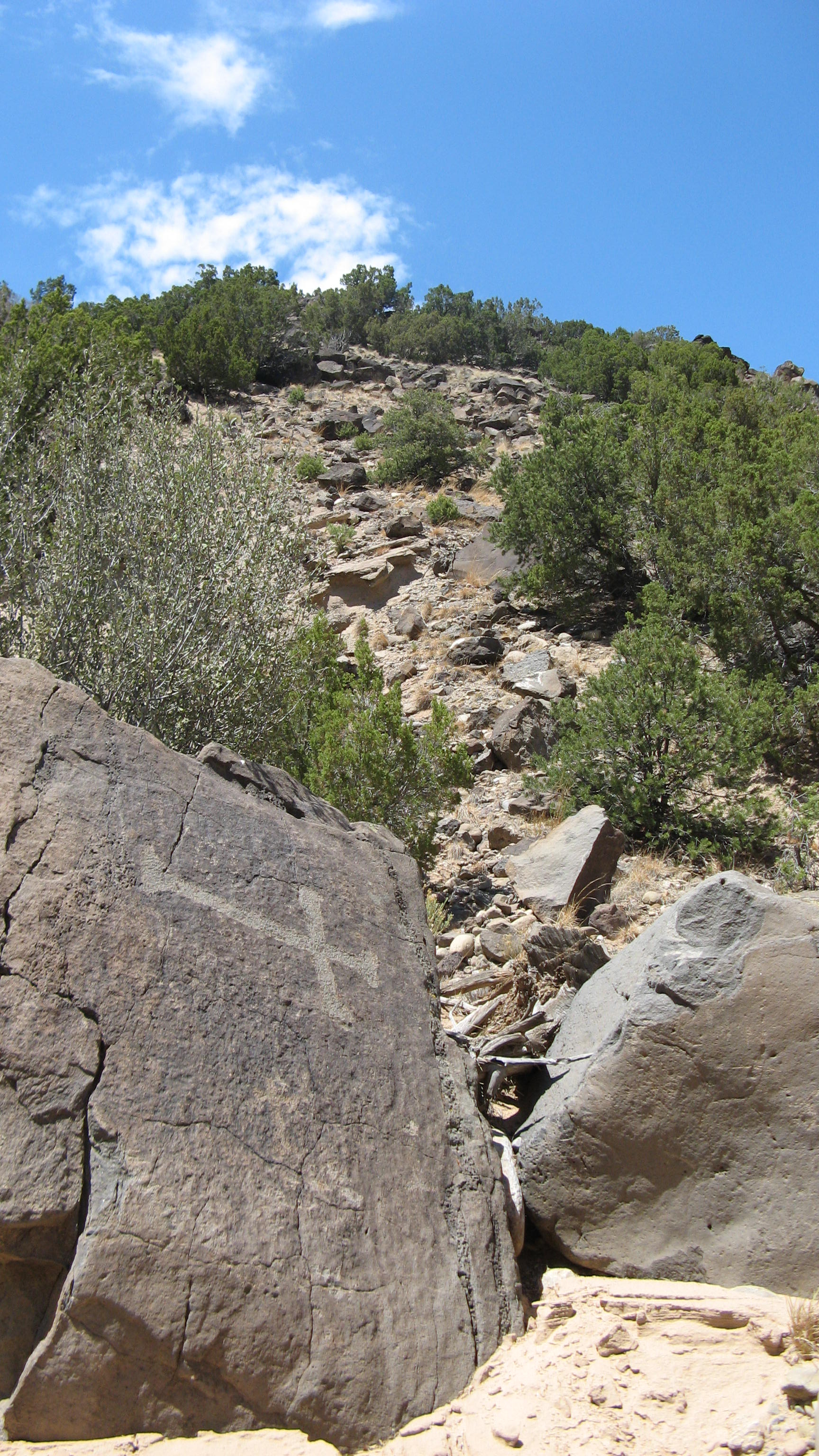
Crosses, or Descansos, at the site.

Sterling Price's official report of the battle describes it as follows:

The rapid slopes of the mountains rendered the enemy's position very strong, and its strength was increased by the dense masses of cedar and large fragments of rock which everywhere offered shelter. The action was commenced by Capt. St. Vrain, who, dismounting his men, ascended the mountain on the left doing much execution. Flanking parties were thrown out on either side, commanded respectively by Lieut. White, 2d regiment Missouri mounted volunteers, and by Lieutenants Mellvaine and Taylor, 1st dragoons. These parties ascended the hill rapidly, and the enemy soon began to retire in the direction of Embudo, bounding along the steep and rugged sides of the mountains with a speed that defied pursuit. The firing at the pass of Embudo had been heard at La Joya, [now called "Velarde"] and Captain Slack, with twenty-five mounted men had been immediately dispatched thither. He now arrived, and rendered excellent service by relieving Lieutenant White whose men were much fatigued. Lieutenants Mellvaine and Taylor were also recalled; and Lieutenant Ingalls was directed to lead a flanking party on the right slope, while Captain Slack performed the same duty on the left. The enemy having by this time retreated beyond our reach, Captain Burgwin marched through the defile and debouched into the open valley in which Embudo is situated, recalled the flanking parties, and entered that town without opposition, several persons meeting him with a white flag.

== Aftermath ==
Price's forces then marched on to Taos where they engaged in the Siege of Pueblo de Taos.

Local tradition states that a series of crosses were chipped into several large rocks marking the spots where defenders were killed. These can still be seen today (2008).

== See also ==
- List of battles of the Mexican–American War
- List of conflicts in the United States
