= Celebrations at the end of the American Civil War =

1865 celebrations of Confederate surrender

The American Civil War did not have a clear ending, but by the beginning of April 1865 it was obvious that the Union had won. Richmond fell on April 2. The Army of Northern Virginia surrendered to General Ulysses Grant at Appomattox Court House on April 9, 1865. This good news produced, in the North, a call for public celebrations.

Since the beginning of the war had been the firing on and surrender ("lowering the flag") of Fort Sumter, in Charleston, South Carolina, the decision was made to ceremonially raise the Union flag over it. The original flag had been preserved as a patriotic object, and the occasion was one of the first celebrations of the impending end of the war.

== Celebrations of March 4, postponed to March 6 ==
The Committee for Celebration of the Union Victories unanimously resolved on February 25 "that the people of the city of New York do hereby invite the co-operation of every loyal municipality in the Union, to unite in a general celebration of the successes of Union arms, on Saturday, the 4th of March, ensuing at midday, that by the sound of cannon, the ringing of bells and the uprising of the voices of the people, the national heart may be made glad and gratitude and honor be rendered to the gallant men, that have preserved the life of the Union."

March 4 was also the date of Lincoln's 2nd Inauguration, but at the time inaugurations were much more local events than they later became. Lincoln's inauguration was no reason not to celebrate elsewhere Lincoln's and the Nation's war victories.

Because of rain the celebration was postponed until March 6; the delay added impetus to the celebrations because news arrived of General Sheridan's victory at the Battle of Waynesboro, Virginia. In Oregon, the 6th was observed "with parade [sic], rejoicings, firing of guns and illumination in every part of this state". In San Francisco business was "entirely suspended". In New York City, "the procession was the most imposing ever witnessed here", and in Union Square the crowd was "probably the largest ever seen in New York". One of "the imposing displays" in the procession was that of the Singer Sewing Machine Company, with their six-horse teams splendidly decorated, drawing trucks upon which were erected "magnificent pavilions filled with young ladies, operating Singer machines in the manufacture of army clothing. On the insides of the pavilions was inscribed: 'We clothe the Union armies while Grant is dressing the rebels.'" They were escorted by a full band and 1,000 men, employees of the company.

Also on exhibit was "a complete model of the original Monitor, which fought the Merrimac, and representations of Fort Sumter as it now appears after four years battering from Union guns, with the old flag again floating over it; a full battery of cannons, captured from the rebels, will form one of the features of the procession, and will be manned by veterans, who will fire salutes at various points."

== Confederate day of fasting on March 10 ==
The Confederate Congress invited President Jefferson Davis to "appoint a day of public fasting, humiliation and prayer". Davis chose Friday, March 10.

== Call for a national "Day of Thanksgiving" ==
That the war was ending, with the Union victorious, was obvious to everyone. Richmond fell on April 2. The newspaper headline was "The End". Celebrations started to erupt all over the North.

As reported by the Associated Press, on April 8 a group of Wall Street merchants requested of President Lincoln a "National Thanksgiving Day", asking him to "select a fitting time and an appropriate manner, to be hereafter determined, to celebrate the victories achieved in securing the final triumph of the Nation, to the end that the people of New York may have an opportunity to evince their gratitude and affection for the [illegible] great leader of the American army, Ulysses S. Grant, and the gallant officers and soldiers whose deeds have rendered his name immortal." They posted the letter in the rotunda of the Customs House, where they met, so that the public could add their signatures before it was sent to the President.

We respectfully request that a day be designated[,] in your own good time, which may be set apart, when the whole people may be invited to assemble and meet together to offer praise and thanksgiving for the brilliant successes, which, under Divine Providence, have been secured to us by the persistent energy, sagacity and fidelity of the Government, and by the intrepidity and self-sacrificing devotion of the army and navy engaged in maintaining our honor and preserving the life of the nation; for the countless blessings we enjoy under the benign influence of free institutions; and for the cheering prospect now opening before us of an even more united, prosperous, and happy country.

Already by April 8, plans for a ceremony on the 14th had been made.

The Arago sailed [from New York] for Charleston today [April 8], full of passengers, who expect to participate in the ceremony of raising the old flag on Fort Sumter, on Friday next. General Anderson went on board precisely at noon, having with him a letter-bag bearing the inscription "Major–General Anderson, Fort Sumter, April 14, 1865," and also a box containing the old flag of Fort Sumter. It is intended that the flag shall be raised by Sargeant Peter Hart, who run [sic] up the Stars and Stripes on a temporary flag-staff after it had been shot away by the Rebels in 1861. The Arago will stop at Hampton Roads, where Mrs. Lincoln and a large number of other passengers will be taken on board.

On April 9, Lee surrendered at Appomattox Court House, Virginia. This was generally regarded as the end of the war.

== Designation of April 14 ==
Lincoln never declared a thanksgiving day; he was in Richmond, where on April 4 he "gave a public reception in Jeff. Davis' parlor" (in the White House of the Confederacy). However, the governors of a half dozen states designated the 14th as a day of thanksgiving. First was Governor Reuben Fenton of New York. He declared "the 14th of April instant (the day appointed for the ceremony of raising the United States flag on Fort Sumter) as a day of thanksgiving, prayer and praise to Almighty God, for the signal blessings we have received at His hands; and I hereby recommend religious societies of all denominations to open their places of worship, and the people, abstaining from their usual avocations, to assemble therein, and with grateful hearts unite in prayer and praise to Him who has so mercifully remembered us in the hour of our greatest need and peril."

John Brough, Governor of Ohio, envisioned a more secular celebration:

It is therefore recommended that Friday next, the 14th day of April, being the anniversary of the fall of Fort Sumter, be generally observed by the people of this State as a day of thanksgiving to God and general rejoicing; that religious assemblages and observances mark the day, and the evening be given to bonfires, illuminations, thundering of artillery, public assemblages, speeches, and such other manifestations as may be suggested to appropriately mark the heroic deeds of our armies and the general joy of our people at the early restoration oi the Constitution and good government.

On the 11th he said that "a call for a national thanksgiving is being prepared".

The fourth anniversary was the 13th, not the 14th, as the press immediately pointed out, but it was too late to do anything about it.

Another problem was that the 14th was also Good Friday; Reuben Fenton, Governor of New York, in response to "the wishes now made known to me of patriotic persons representing some of our religious denominations", changed the designated celebration day to Thursday, April 20. However, Henry Ward Beecher, America's leading minister, just before departing for the celebrations in Charleston, pointed out that Good Friday was not only the day of Jesus's Crucifixion, it was also the day of His Resurrection. The celebrations did take place on the 14th.

== "A grand illumination": Lincoln's speech on April 11 ==
"Illumination" is meant literally. The world in 1865 was a darker place compared with today, when indoor light usually was based on animal fat, dim candles or whale oil lamps. Lighting bright enough to light up the outdoors was still new. Electric light was decades away: this was gas lighting, using gas manufactured from coal rather than hard-to-transport natural gas, and then the new manufactured fuel kerosene. To have a large building, like the U.S. Capitol, the White House, or the partially-completed Washington Monument brightly lit at night was, at the time, impressive and even awe-inspiring. The newly-illuminated streets also allowed happy crowds to assemble and watch parades.

As a result, "illumination" was the usual expression of public joy. For example, there were illuminations in Charleston upon Lincoln's election in 1860, because it made South Carolina's secession much more likely, and this was for many in Charleston cause for rejoicing.

On April 11, by the light of a "grand illumination," Lincoln spoke at the White House to "an immense throng". Among other topics discussed was conferring franchise on "the colored man", which Lincoln now was for, starting by conferring it "on the very intelligent, and on those who serve our cause as soldiers."

John Wilkes Booth, who was already plotting against Lincoln, heard the President give this speech. He remarked that "this means nigger citizenship. ...That is the last speech he'll ever make."

== Illuminations in Washington, D.C., on April 13 ==
On Thursday, April 13, the city lit up:

The Illumination To-night

The White House, Capitol, War Department and bureaux, Navy Department, State Department, Treasury Department, General Post Office, Patent Office, and indeed all the public buildings will be illuminated in conjunction with the general illumination on the part of the city, and the effect altogether must be exceedingly brilliant. Numbers of public-spirited citizens are preparing special features of attractiveness to add to the interest of the display, but we forbear from going into details, as that would mar the pleasure of a surprise.

The New-York Herald commented thus the next day:

The illumination epidemic broke forth again tonlght, stimulated thereto by corporate invitation of the City Council. Every street from Georgetown to the Navy Yard, and a majority of the houses in all the streets, were brilliant with patriotlc fires. The like was never before seen in the National Capltal. The words "Union," "Victory," "Grant," "Sheridan," "Sherman," "Thomas," "Terry," "Farragut" and "Porter"' were blazed from a thousand dwellings, while music steam whistles [calliopes, just invented], cheers and speeches intensified the all-prevalent delirium.

The entire front page of the Washington Evening Star, in very small type, was dedicated to descriptions of the illuminations:

Last night Washington was ablaze with glory. The very heavens seemed to have come down, and the stars twinkled in a sort of faded way, as if the solar system was out of order, and earth had become the great luminary. Everybody illuminated. Every flag was flung out, windows were gay with many devices, and gorgeous lanterns danced on their ropes along the walls in a fantastic way, as if the fairies were holding hokiday inside. The streets began to fill up at an early hour...

The report continues with descriptions of the displays at City Hall, the American Telegraph office, the Bank of Washington, Hook & Ladder Company No. 1, all the hotels and stores, the mayor's house, and so on for a very long list of others.

Bell's photographic establishment displayed the transparency, "Glory to the Union and her brave defenders," and the establishment of E.Z.Steever was ornamented by a design in gas jets, brilliantly exhibiting the letters U.S. above a globe, bearing the word Grant. Beneath the whole was the motto, "The Union Forever".

== Activities of April 14, 1865 ==
=== Raising the Flag at Fort Sumter ===
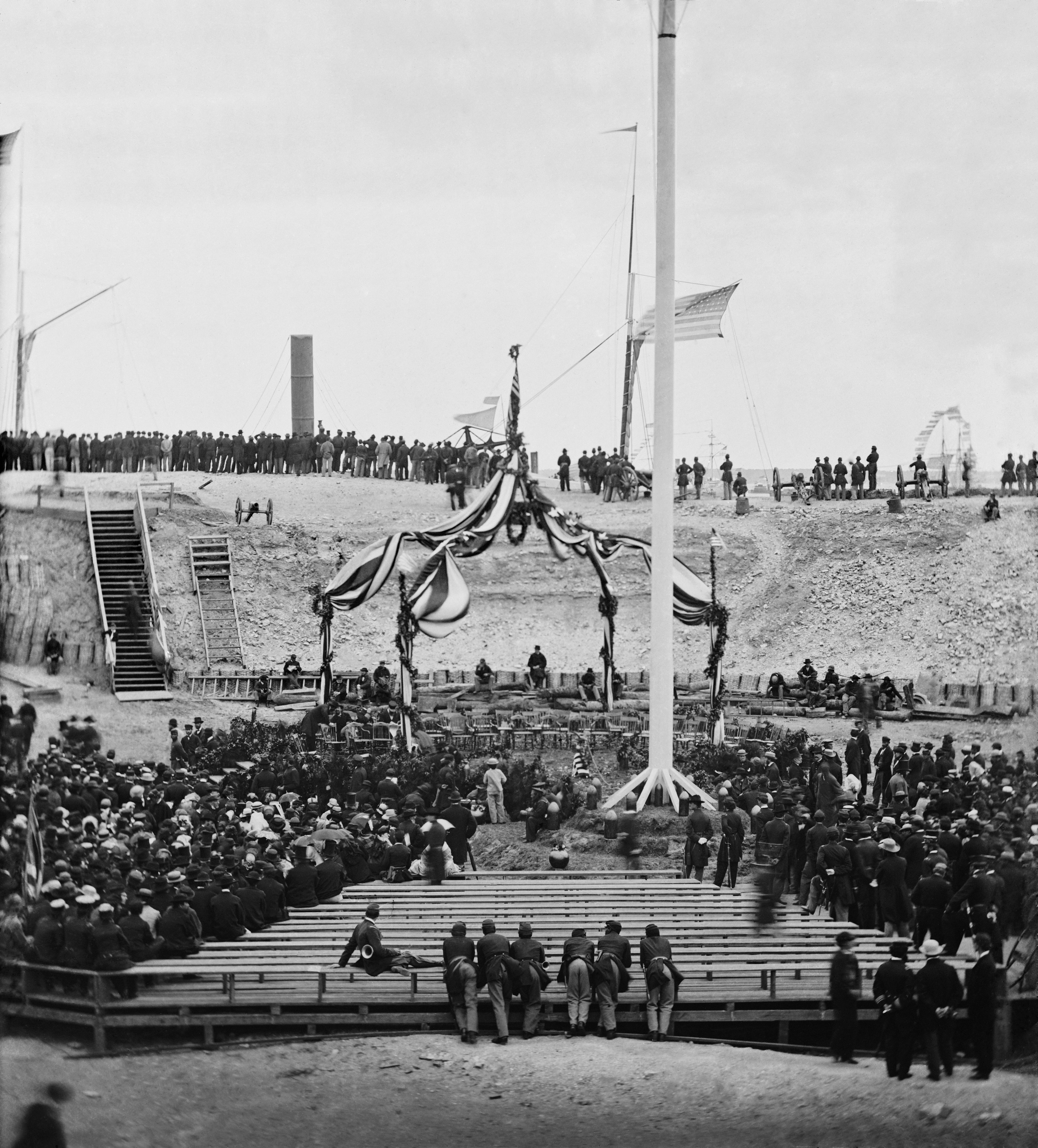
Flag-raising over Fort Sumter, April 14, 1865

The Battle of Fort Sumter had begun the war in 1861. When the Union garrison surrendered and evacuated Fort Sumter, their commander, Major Robert Anderson, took the Fort's flag with him. The flag was "sacredly preserved" in a small wooden box, and was exhibited on patriotic occasions, in the North of course, during the Civil War. It was widely known as a Union patriotic symbol.

On February 18, 1865, Rebel (Confederate) forces withdrew from Charleston after setting fire to several thousand bales of cotton, which fire spread to buildings; the first task of Union forces was to help residents extinguish the fires. "The flag which General Anderson hauled down nearly four years ago...[was] raised amid deafening cheers" by Captain Henry M. Bragg, according to newspaper reports of the 21st. One report says it was raised by a Major Hennessey, but does not state it was the same flag that was lowered in 1861.

On February 22, 1865 the New York Chamber of Commerce unanimously resolved to ask President Lincoln to send now-Major General Robert Anderson by ship to Fort Sumter, so that he could raise the original flag.

"Raising the Flag at Fort Sumter" was a ceremony—a newspaper called it a "performance"—that took place at Fort Sumter, in the harbor of Charleston, South Carolina, on Friday, April 14, 1865, four years almost to the day after the Fort Sumter Flag was lowered at the beginning of the American Civil War. General Lee had surrendered at Appomattox on Sunday, April 9. It was intended to symbolically mark and celebrate the Union victory and the end of the war.

A party of 180, including "a large delegation of Mr. Beecher's congregation", sailed on the Oceanus from New York for Charleston on April 10, arriving on the afternoon of the 13th. "It was our welcome mission to announce the joyful news in Charleston of Lee's surrender," which was received with "wild shouts of enthusiasm". The Arago brought many more, and numerous other steamers from Savannah and Beaufort, South Carolina, were "thronged with visitors".

The following day, Friday the 14th, the many celebrants were transported to Fort Sumter, where a new wharf had been constructed, They were so numerous that a flotilla of boats was necessary. The Canonicus took the lead, followed by the steamers Blackstone, Oceanus, Delaware, W. W. Colt, Nelly Baker, Golden Gate, and Anna Maria. Also participating was the famous USS Planter, under fugitive slave Captain Robert Smalls, who had in 1862 stolen the steamer, hoodwinked the maritime defenders of Charleston into believing he was on an authorized trip, piloted it past them and surrendered it to the Union Navy. It transported the Black residents of and visitors to Charleston who wanted to attend the Fort Sumter celebrations.

Now-Major General Anderson, though ill and retired, returned to Fort Sumter and raised the flag back up. By designation of President Lincoln, the key "address" at the event was from Henry Ward Beecher, the country's "star" clergyman of the day. Wm. Lloyd Garrison, publisher of the abolitionist newspaper The Liberator, also participated.

"The staff of General Hatch" held a ball on the 14th in Charleston, the evening of the day of the celebration of raising the stars and stripes on Fort Sumter. It was held in the same hall as that of General Beauregard's, four years previous. The same caterer and even the same dishes were used on both occasions.

The raising is overshadowed by the assassination of President Lincoln, which happened that evening. Reports on the ceremony and on Lincoln sometimes appeared on the same page, along with ads for Our American Cousin, the play Lincoln was seeing at Ford's Theater. The ceremony at Fort Sumter, though well documented, is missing from the two books on the role of Fort Sumter in the Civil War.

=== Celebrations elsewhere ===
In Washington D.C. there was a torch light parade of about 2,000, starting at the Arsenal, then to the White House, then to the residence of Secretary [of War Edwin] Stanton who addressed the group, as did General A. D. Foster, "of Sumter reknown [sic]". There were bands and Howitzers in the parade, and it was to end with fireworks. Grover's Theater devoted the evening to a celebration of the victory. "Koppitz has set music to the new poem—'When Sherman marched down to the Sea'—which will be most effectively sung by Miss Effie Germon."

In Columbus, Ohio, "the Union celebration", as it was called in the published programme, began at 6 AM with 100 guns, repeated at noon and at 6 PM. Speeches were followed by a torch-light procession and fireworks. In Bellows Falls, Vermont, "the people became wild with excitement, a rush was made upon the sexton who was thrown out after he had cut the bell rope [to prevent the church bell from being rung] and one man had received some injury, and the people scaled the steeple and rang the bell loud and long and cheered for the Union, while those in the street below responded lustily. At one time there was an inclination among the incensed populace to burn the church. The village is in an uproar. Guns, bells, horns and engines are making all the noise they can. Business has been suspended, the fire company is parading the streets, the public schools are let out, and the children are marching about with banners, bells and ribbons."

In Bangor, Maine, the "Stars and Stripes" was raised 1,000 feet (300 m) over the city by kites. A "monster kite" read "U.S. Grant".

In Philadelphia, "the colored people" had a parade and presented a flag to the Twenty-fifth Regiment of the United States Colored Troops. Other celebrations were planned for Monday the 17th.
