= John H. Eicher =

American chemist and academic (1921–2016)

- Born: March 30, 1921; Dayton, Ohio
- Died: June 7, 2016 (aged 95)
- Education: Purdue University
- Occupations: Professor; Organic chemist; Author
- Known for: Manhattan Project; Ohio Senior Citizen of the Year 2016
- Notable work: Civil War High Commands
- Spouse: Susan Ann Eicher
- Children: 2 including David J. Eicher

John Harold Eicher (March 30, 1921 – June 7, 2016) was an organic chemist, philosopher of science, historian, and author. He was a Manhattan Project scientist who worked at Columbia University to develop the first atomic bomb, and taught chemistry at Miami University in Oxford, Ohio, for 37 years. Eicher was the author of several chemistry publications and, with his son David J. Eicher, was coauthor of the reference book Civil War High Commands.

In 2016, Eicher was elected by the State of Ohio to the class of 2016, Ohio Senior Citizens of the Year. He taught for Miami University's Institute for Learning and Retirement for many years, and was a teacher for 75 continuous years, with his first assistant teaching role in 1941 in a mineralogy class at Purdue University.

== Early life and education ==
The product of German, Swiss, and a small amount of Delaware Native American ancestry, Eicher was born in Dayton, Ohio. Eicher's father, Harold Ralph Eicher (1892–1968) was a sales manager and his mother, Myrtle Grace (née Wetzel) Eicher (1894–1989) was a seamstress, public school teacher, and piano and organ teacher.

Eicher attended Fairview Elementary School. Eicher organized a chemical laboratory at his home in Dayton, and practiced chemistry and all aspects of photography with a Leica camera. He studied chemistry at Fairview High School, where he was the laboratory assistant. There, he placed first in the 1938 district scholarship and fourth in Ohio.

At Purdue University in West Lafayette, Indiana, Eicher continued his chemistry studies, obtaining a B.S. degree in 1942. While an undergraduate, he prepared sulfamic acid, used in the preparation of various sulfa drugs at Johns Hopkins University; he collected scrap iron for the war effort. He served as laboratory assistant in mineralogy for the Purdue School of Chemical and Metallurgical Engineering.

== Career ==
Moving to the Ohio State University in Columbus, Eicher helped in the preparation of aviation gasoline components such as triptane, a reference compound, which was sent to the Royal Air Force during the Battle of Britain. He joined the American Chemical Society in 1943, later serving as an assistant secretary and as a councilor.

In mid-1943 Eicher joined the Manhattan Project at Columbia University in New York, working first with Willard Libby (1908–1980), Nobel Laureate in 1960; then with Harold C. Urey (1893–1981), chair of the chemistry department and 1934 Nobel Laureate; with John R. Dunning (1907–1975), dean of engineering; and with Leslie R. Groves (1896–1970), major general, commanding the Manhattan Engineer District. There Eicher worked on the synthesis of fluorocarbons used as lubricants, as plastics such as Teflon. He then worked on pilot plant tests for the enrichment of uranium-235. Finally, Eicher spent two years along with colleague Albert L. Myerson (1919–2004) constructing and operating a gas viscosimeter used to study uranium hexafluoride at various temperatures and pressures, the data from which were used in the production of uranium isotopes at the large gaseous diffusion plant at Oak Ridge, Tennessee.

Returning to Purdue University in 1945 for graduate studies, Eicher taught organic technic and qualitative analysis for six years as an assistant instructor. He became a longtime chapter secretary for the Phi Lambda Upsilon national chemistry honorary, and a member of the research Society of the Sigma Xi. With colleague Alec Kelley (1923–2013), he founded a Unitarian fellowship which later became the Unitarian-Universalist Church of Lafayette, Indiana. Eicher then worked on the preparation of various nitro and oximino compounds to earn his Ph.D. in 1952. One of his dissertation advisors was Herbert C. Brown (1912–2004), 1979 Nobel Laureate. Eicher often visited with his friend Linus C. Pauling (1901–1994), who won two Nobel Prizes, one for chemistry in 1954 and the Peace Prize in 1962.

Eicher joined the chemistry department at Miami University in Oxford, Ohio, in 1952, and he subsequently taught chemistry there for 37 years. In 1953 he organized a student and faculty liberal religious club at Miami which became a Unitarian Fellowship and later evolved into the Hopedale Unitarian-Universalist Community.

== Personal life ==
On June 12, 1957, Eicher married Susan Ann Arne (1923–1983), a sociologist and legal secretary, in Sarasota, Florida. They had two children, Nancy Grace Eicher (1959– ), a journalist and editor, and David John Eicher (1961– ), astronomer and historian.

Eicher and his son David collaborated on a number of books focusing on the American Civil War, including Civil War High Commands.
