= Battle on the Bay =

1998 book

Battle on the Bay: The Civil War Struggle for Galveston
- Author: Edward T. Cotham
- Subject: U.S. Civil War
- Publisher: University of Texas Press
- Publication date: 1998

Battle on the Bay: The Civil War Struggle for Galveston is a nonfiction book by Edward T. Cotham, published by University of Texas Press in 1998. It discusses battles in the U.S. Civil War concerning Galveston, Texas.

== Reception ==
James Smallwood of Oklahoma State University wrote that "this reviewer believes that this volume will be recognized as the definitive study about the topic." Smallwood added that this was "a solidly researched, readable volume." He added that the discussion on the activities of civilians during the conflict was "important and interesting". He had some critiques but characterized them as "minor".

Andrew Duppstadt of the North Carolina Division of State Historic Sites stated that the book is "delightful and entertaining", praising the way it was organized.

Dwight F. Henderson of the University of Texas at San Antonio stated that the work was "well researched" and praised the introduction as "excellent", but criticized the lack of "analysis and coherence".
