= David J. Eicher =

American editor (born 1961)

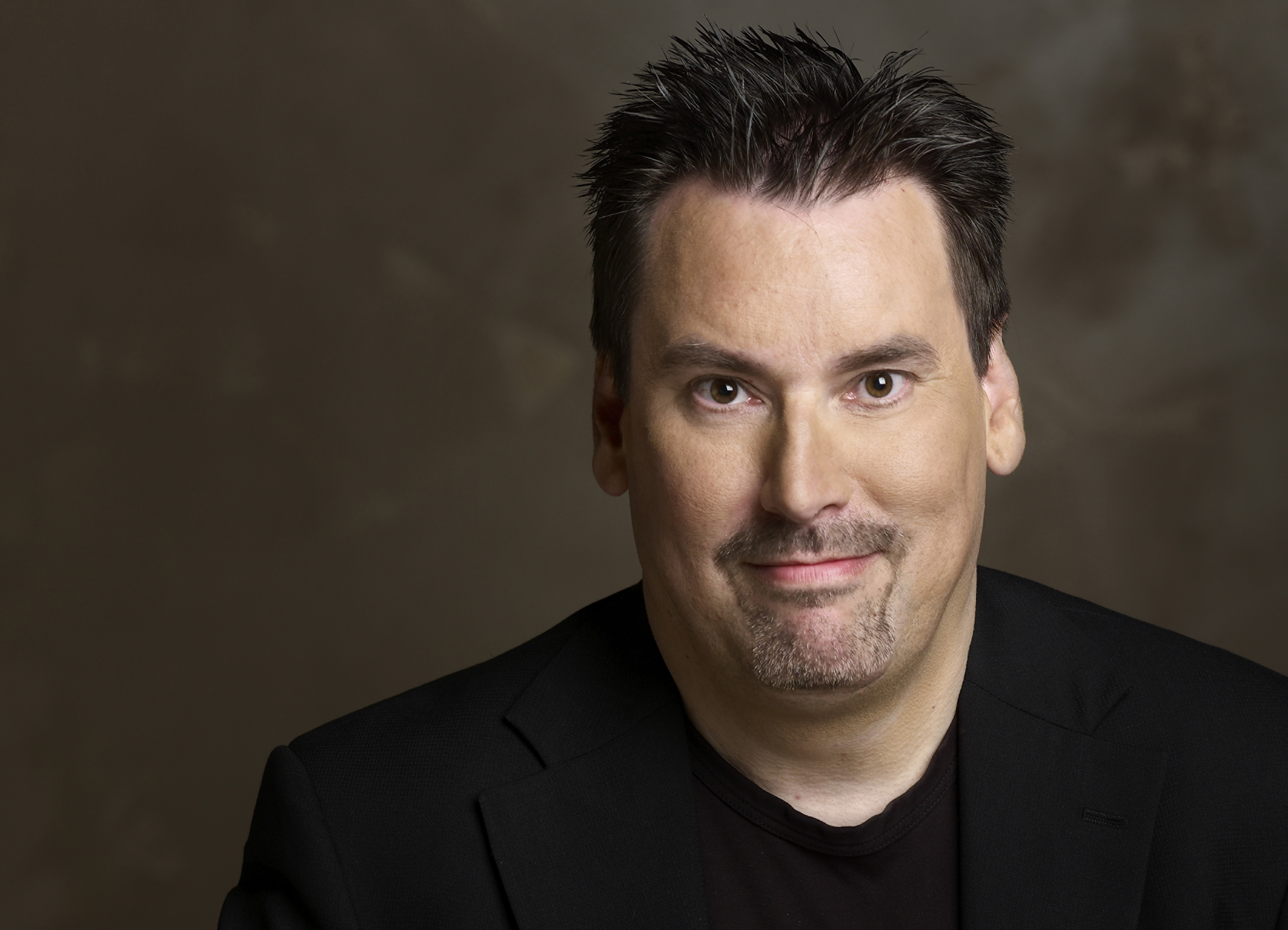
- David J. Eicher in 2010
- Born: David John Eicher; August 7, 1961 (age 65); Oxford, Ohio, U.S.
- Education: Miami University
- Occupations: Editor; Author; Producer
- Years active: 1977–present
- Known for: Astronomy; Civil War history
- Notable work: Astronomy magazine; Deep Sky magazine
- Title: Editor-in-Chief of Astronomy Magazine (2002-2025)
- Father: John H. Eicher
- Website: www.davideicher.com

Signature
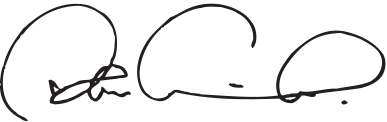

David John Eicher (born August 7, 1961) is an American editor, writer, and popularizer of astronomy and space. He was editor-in-chief of Astronomy magazine between 2002 and 2025. He is author, coauthor, or editor of 23 books on science and American history and founded a magazine on astronomical observing, Deep Sky Monthly, when he was a 15-year-old high school student.

Eicher is also a historian, having researched and written extensively about the American Civil War.

== Professional career ==
Eicher began his career at AstroMedia Corp., the magazine's publisher, in September 1982 as assistant editor of Astronomy Magazine and editor of Deep Sky. In 1985, Kalmbach Publishing Co., the Milwaukee publisher of Model Railroader, Trains, and other titles, bought AstroMedia Corp. Eicher's role in the magazine deepened as he worked on many science stories as well as observing pieces and by decade's end, the company moved to Waukesha, Wisconsin, near Milwaukee, and by that time Eicher was promoted to associate editor.

He published his first books, The Universe from Your Backyard (a compilation of deep-sky observing stories first published in Astronomy), and Deep-Sky Observing with Small Telescopes, an anthology about clusters, nebulae, and galaxies. In 1992, the company decided to cease publishing Deep Sky. Although Eicher has stated that he enjoyed editing this smaller magazine, it became clear that to progress further on Astronomy, he had to give up the smaller journal. At its peak, however, and at the time of its discontinuance, Deep Sky swelled to a circulation of 14,000. Within a span of six weeks in 1996, Eicher was promoted successively to senior editor and then to managing editor. After six years as managing editor, in 2002 Eicher became the sixth editor-in-chief of Astronomy Magazine. As of 2025, he has stepped down from his role as editor.

== Promotion of astronomy ==
Eicher frequently travels to speak on astronomy or view solar eclipses with tour groups. In 2013 he was invited to speak about great advances in astronomy and on comets at Harvard University, in the Phillips Auditorium of Harvard College Observatory. He was among the 2014 speakers at the Starmus Festival in Tenerife, Canary Islands, and spoke at Harvard again in the spring of 2016, as well as delivering a public talk at Lowell Observatory, Flagstaff, Arizona, in November 2016. In 2017 he spoke at the Science + Mathematics Think-in at WVIZ-PBS ideastream in Cleveland, Ohio. He also spoke at the America's Darkest Sky Star Party at the Dark Sky New Mexico site near Animas, New Mexico in April 2017 and October 2017, and in April 2018 delivered the Benson Memorial Lecture in Physics at Miami University in Oxford, Ohio.

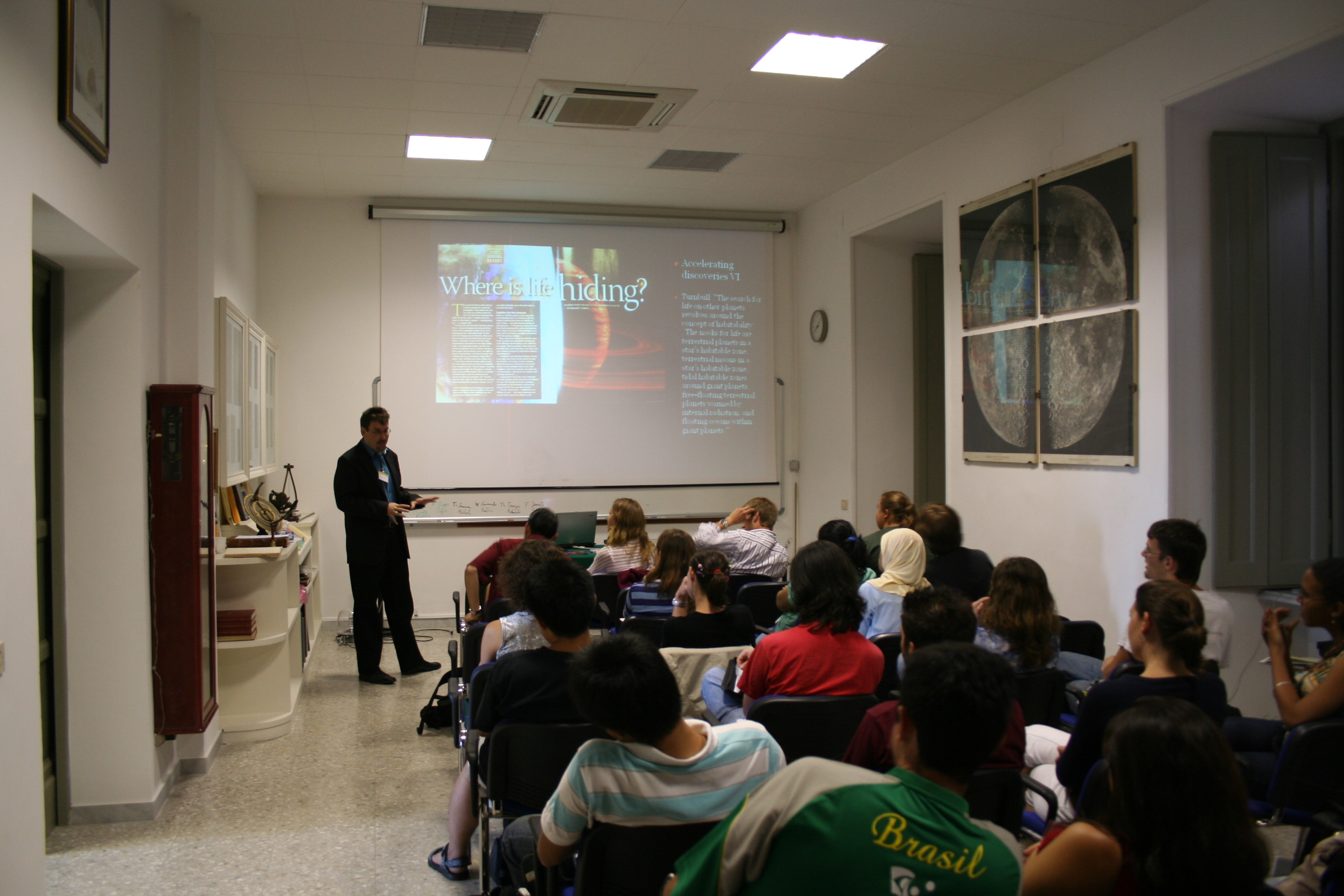
David Eicher speaking at the Vatican Observatory, Castel Gandolfo, southeast of Rome, Italy, 2007.

From 2011 through 2017, Eicher was president of the Astronomy Foundation. the first ever trade association for the telescope industry.

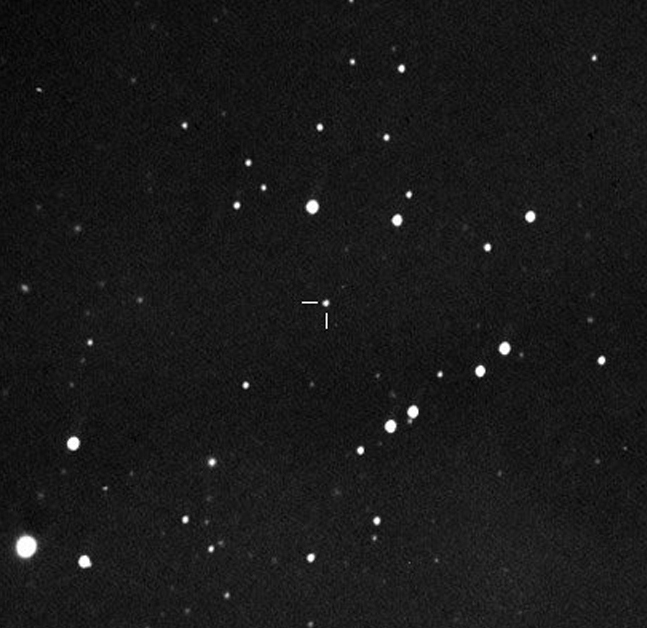
Asteroid 3617 Eicher (tick marks) imaged by Canadian astrophotographer Jack Newton on July 5, 2005, using a robotic telescope placed in Portal, Arizona. At this time the asteroid shone at magnitude 16.7 and was just south of the Virgo Cluster of galaxies.

Eicher's service to the astronomy world was recognized in 1990 when the International Astronomical Union named minor planet 3617 Eicher (discovery designation 1984 LJ) in his honor. The asteroid, a main belt object in orbit between Mars and Jupiter, was discovered by astronomer Brian A. Skiff at Lowell Observatory's Anderson Mesa Station in 1984 and the citation was proposed and written by astronomer David H. Levy.

Eicher's books include COMETS! Visitors from Deep Space a book with Brian May of Queen fame, and astronomer Garik Israelian, constituting the conference proceedings, lectures, and information from the first Starmus Festival, a science and music event held in 2011 in the Canary Islands.

Beginning in 2013, he has been a blogger on astronomy and science topics for The Huffington Post. In 2015, he joined the Asteroid Day movement as a 100x signatory and serves on that project's board as Editor-in-Chief.] In May 2015, he was named to the Board of Directors of the Starmus Festival.

In 2015, Eicher began producing a video series addressing realities of astronomy and astrophysics. Titled "The Real Reality Show", it appears on YouTube and on Astronomy.com. An audio interview series, Superstars of Astronomy, features hour-long podcast talks with prominent astronomers, planetary scientists, and cosmologists, including Jeff Hester, Garik Israelian, Martin Rees, Seth Shostak, Debra Fischer, Sara Seager, Heidi Hammel, and others.

In 2017, Eicher started an audio podcast series 5 Questions with David Eicher, which is hosted on the Astronomy Magazine website and features interviews about current scientific research with well-known astronomers, planetary scientists, and cosmologists.

In June 2017, Eicher joined the advisory board of Lowell Observatory, in Flagstaff, Arizona. Also in June 2017, Eicher attended and was a principal actor at the fourth Starmus Festival, which took place in Trondheim, Norway. Eicher served as host on the Festival's opening day, delivered two talks about galaxies, served as moderator and host of a panel discussing science education.

== Civil War history ==
Eicher has written eight books on the subject of the American Civil War, including Dixie Betrayed (Little, Brown), The Longest Night (Simon and Schuster), Civil War High Commands (collaboration with his father John H. Eicher), and The Civil War in Books (Univ. of Illinois Press).

In 2013 Eicher donated his Civil War library of more than 4,000 volumes, collected since 1982, to the Ulysses S. Grant Presidential Library and Ulysses S. Grant Association at Mississippi State University.

== Personal life ==
Eicher lives near Big Bend, Wisconsin.

Eicher has been a drummer since grade school days in Ohio and currently plays with his band, the Astro Blues Band, in Wisconsin, which consists mostly of people who work with Eicher on Astronomy Magazine.

== Publications ==
- Astronomy Backstage Pass: Northern Arizona (DVD and streaming video product, Kalmbach Publishing Co., 2019)
- Mission Moon 3-D [with Brian May, foreword by Charlie Duke, and Afterword by Jim Lovell] (London Stereoscopic Company and MIT Press, 2018)
- Astronomy Backstage Pass: Chicago (DVD and streaming video product, Kalmbach Publishing Co., 2018)
- 5 Questions with David Eicher (audio podcast interview series, Kalmbach Publishing Co., 2017–2019)
- Starmus: Discovering the Universe (Executive editor, Canopus Books, 2016)
- The New Cosmos: Answering Astronomy’s Big Questions (Cambridge University Press, 2015)
- Superstars of Astronomy (audio podcast interview series, Kalmbach Publishing Co., 2015–2017)
- The Real Reality Show (video series, Kalmbach Publishing Co., 2015–2019)
- Starmus: 50 Years of Man in Space (executive editor, Canopus Books, 2014)
- COMETS! Visitors from Deep Space (Cambridge University Press, 2013)
- Astronomy Magazine: The Complete Collection (DVD), including The History of Astronomy Magazine (Kalmbach, 2011)
- Lincoln the Liberal Strategist (Or, a Good Man is Hard to Find) (The Lincoln Fellowship of Wisconsin, 2011)
- A New Birth of Freedom: Abraham Lincoln's Bicentennial (1809–2009) (Abraham Lincoln Bicentennial Commission, 2009)
- 50 Greatest Mysteries of the Universe (Kalmbach, 2007)
- Dixie Betrayed: How the Confederacy Really Lost the Civil War (Little Brown, 2006)
- Beginner’s Guide to Astronomy (Kalmbach, 2003)
- Gettysburg Battlefield: The Definitive Photographic History (Chronicle Books, 2003)
- The Longest Night: A Military History of the Civil War (Simon and Schuster, 2001)
- Eicher, John H.; Eicher, David J. (2002-06-01). Civil War High Commands (1st ed.). Stanford University Press. ISBN 978-0804736411. LCCN 2001020194. OCLC 937289168. OL 3941895M.
- Mystic Chords of Memory: Civil War Battlefields and Historic Sites Recaptured (Louisiana State University Press, 1998)
- Robert E. Lee: A Life Portrait (Taylor, 1997)
- The Civil War in Books: An Analytical Bibliography (University of Illinois Press, 1997)
- Civil War Battlefields: A Touring Guide (Taylor, 1995)
- Beginner’s Guide to Amateur Astronomy (Kalmbach, 1993)
- The New Cosmos: The Astronomy of Our Galaxy and Beyond (editor, Kalmbach, 1992)
- Galaxies and the Universe: An Observing Guide from Deep Sky Magazine (editor and coauthor, Kalmbach, 1992)
- Stars and Galaxies: Astronomy’s Guide to Observing the Cosmos (editor and coauthor, Kalmbach, 1992)
- Beyond the Solar System: 100 Best Deep-Sky Objects for Amateur Astronomers (Kalmbach, 1992)
- Civil War Journeys calendar (Tide-mark, 1990–2000)
- Deep Sky Observing with Small Telescopes (Enslow, 1989)
- The Universe from Your Backyard (Cambridge University Press, 1988)
