= Appomattox =

Appomattox is a metonym for the surrender of Robert E. Lee in the American Civil War. It may also refer to the related:

- Battle of Appomattox Court House, leading up to that surrender
- Appomattox Court House National Historical Park, the site of the surrender
- Battle of Appomattox Station, a day before the Battle of Appomattox Court House

Appomattox may also refer to:

- Appomattox County, Virginia, in the United States
  - Appomattox, Virginia, a town and the seat of that county
- Appomattox Court House (disambiguation), several courthouses in Appomattox, Virginia
- Appomattox River, a tributary of the James River in Virginia
- Appomattox Basin a name for the Tri-Cities, Virginia region
- Appomattox Manor, a manor in City Point, Hopewell, Virginia
- CSS Appomatoc, a screw-steam gunboat used by the Confederate States Navy
- SS Appomattox, a large American wooden steamship operated mainly on the Great Lakes
- SS Appomattox (1893), a British steamship of the early 20th century
- Appomattox (opera), a 2007 opera based on the American Civil War, composed by Philip Glass
- Appomattox (statue), a bronze Confederate soldier memorial in Alexandria, Virginia

== See also ==
- Appomattoc (people)
