= Wilmer McLean =

American businessman, involved in the American Civil War

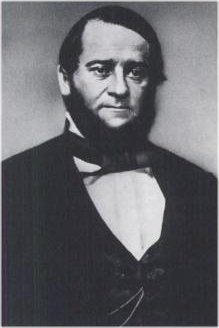
- McLean c. 1860
- Born: May 3, 1814; Manassas, Virginia, U.S.
- Died: June 5, 1882 (aged 68); Alexandria, Virginia, U.S.
- Resting place: St. Paul's Episcopal Cemetery
- Occupation: Grocer

Wilmer McLean (May 3, 1814 – June 5, 1882) was an American wholesale grocer from Virginia. His house, near Manassas, Virginia, was involved in the First Battle of Bull Run in 1861. After the battle, he moved to Appomattox, Virginia, to escape the war, thinking that it would be safe. Instead, in 1865, General Robert E. Lee surrendered to Ulysses S. Grant in McLean's house in Appomattox. His houses were, therefore, involved in one of the first and one of the last encounters of the American Civil War.

== American Civil War ==
=== First Battle of Bull Run ===
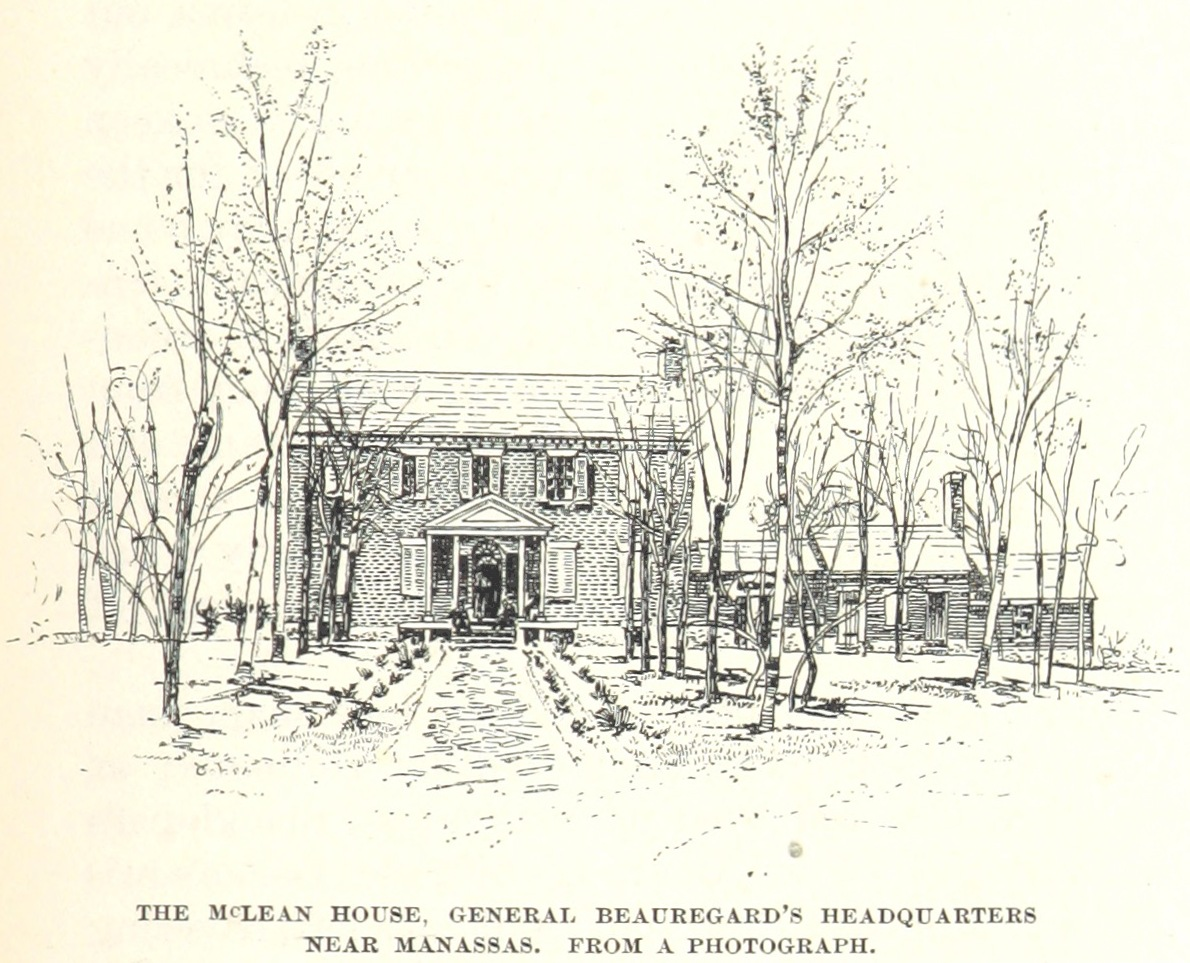
McLean's first house, in Manassas

The initial engagement on July 21, 1861, of what would become the First Battle of Bull Run (First Manassas) took place on McLean's farm, the Yorkshire Plantation, in Manassas, Prince William County, Virginia. Union Army artillery fired at McLean's house, which was being used as a headquarters for Confederate Brigadier General P. G. T. Beauregard, and a cannonball dropped through the kitchen fireplace. Beauregard wrote after the battle, "A comical effect of this artillery fight was the destruction of the dinner of myself and staff by a Federal shell that fell into the fire-place of my headquarters at the McLean House."

McLean was a retired major in the Virginia militia but, at age 47 he was too old to return to active duty at the outbreak of the Civil War. He made his living during the war as a sugar broker supplying the Confederate States Army. He decided to move because his commercial activities were centered mostly in southern Virginia and the Union army presence in his area of northern Virginia made his work difficult. He undoubtedly was also motivated by a desire to protect his family from a repetition of their combat experience. In the spring of 1863, he and his family moved about 120 miles (190 km) south to Appomattox County, Virginia, near a crossroads community called Appomattox Court House.

=== Appomattox Court House ===
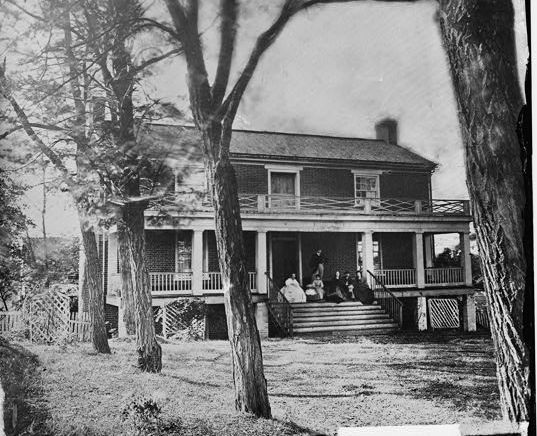
McLean residence in Appomattox Court House, photographed in 1865 by Timothy O'Sullivan

On April 9, 1865, the war revisited McLean. Confederate General Robert E. Lee was about to surrender to Lieutenant General Ulysses S. Grant. He sent a messenger to Appomattox Court House to find a place to meet. On April 8, 1865, the messenger knocked on McLean's door and requested the use of his home, to which McLean reluctantly agreed. Lee surrendered to Grant in the parlor of McLean's house, effectively ending the Civil War. Later, McLean is supposed to have said, "The war began in my front yard and ended in my front parlor."

Once the ceremony was over, members of the Army of the Potomac began taking the tables, chairs, and various other furnishings in the house — essentially, anything that was not tied down — as souvenirs. They simply handed money to the protesting McLean as they made off with his property. Major General Edward Ord paid $40 (equivalent to $822 in today's dollars) for the table Lee had used to sign the surrender document, while Major General Philip Sheridan took the table on which Grant had drafted the document for $20 (equivalent to $411 in today's dollars) in gold. Sheridan then asked George Armstrong Custer to carry it away on his horse. The table was presented to Custer's wife and is now on exhibit at the National Museum of American History at the Smithsonian. An authentic recreation of McLean's second home is now part of the Appomattox Court House National Historical Park operated by the National Park Service of the United States Department of the Interior.

== After the war ==
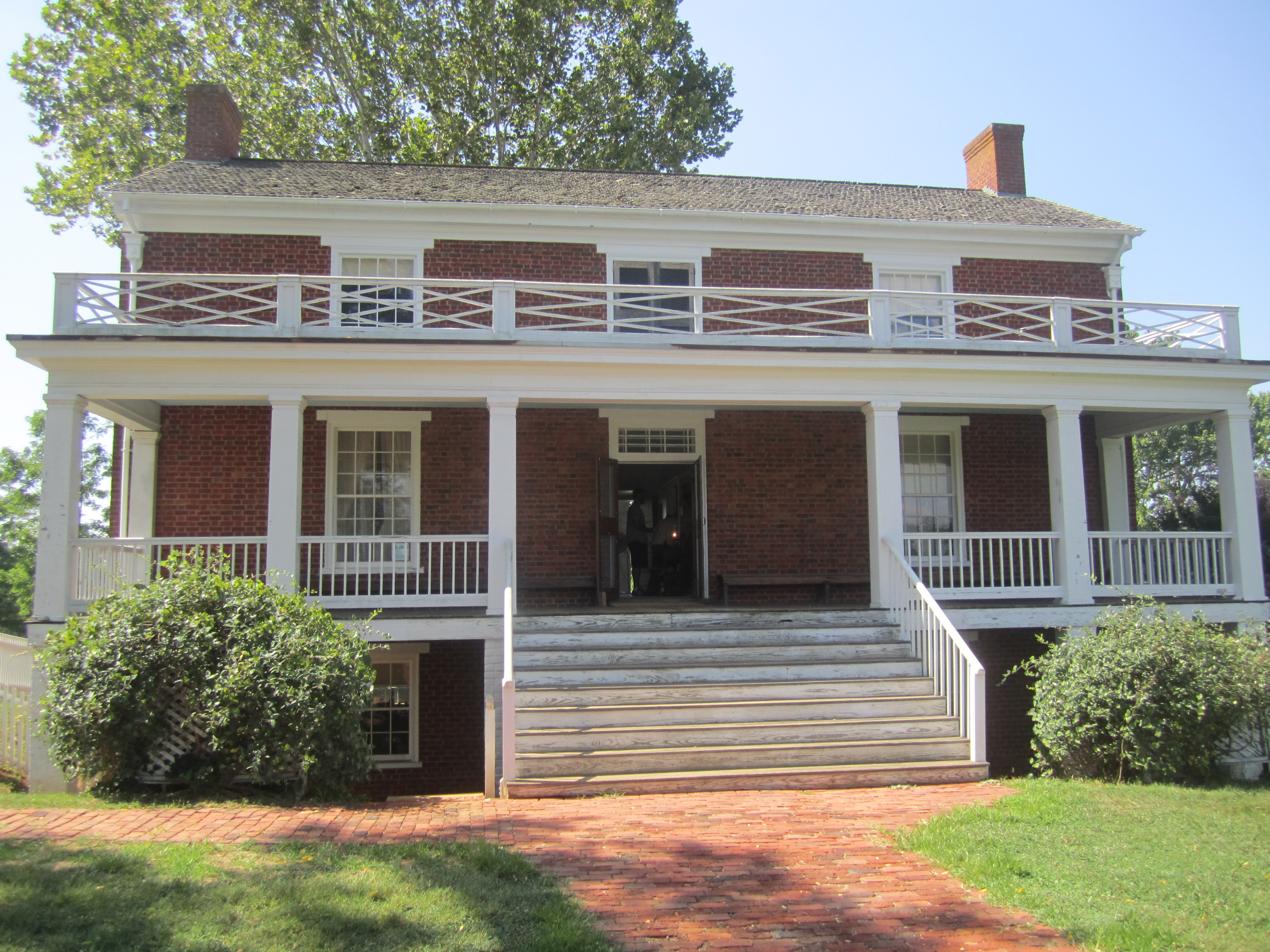
McLean House at Appomattox Court House National Historical Park (photographed 2011)

After the war, McLean and his family sold their house in 1867, unable to keep up the mortgage payments, and returned to their home in Manassas. They later moved to Alexandria, Virginia. He worked for the Internal Revenue Service from 1873 to 1876.

Wilmer McLean died in Alexandria and is buried there at St. Paul's Episcopal Cemetery.
