= Mariah Wright House =

- U.S. Historic district – Contributing property
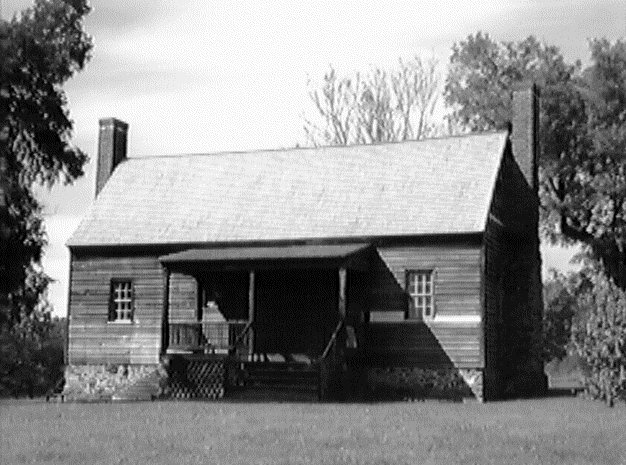
- Mariah Wright House
- Location: Appomattox County, Virginia
- Nearest city: Appomattox, Virginia
- Area: 1,800 acres (728 ha)
- Built: 1823
- Architect: National Park Service
- Visitation: 185,443 (2009)
- Part of: Appomattox Court House National Historical Park (ID66000827)
- Added to NRHP: October 15, 1966

The Mariah Wright house is a structure within the Appomattox Court House National Historical Park. It was registered in the National Park Service's database of Official Structures on June 26, 1989.

== History ==
The Mariah Wright house was constructed in 1823 by Pryor Wright.

It is associated with the site where the surrender of the Confederate Army under Robert E. Lee to Union commander Ulysses S. Grant took place on April 9, 1865 with their major commanders.

== Historical significance ==
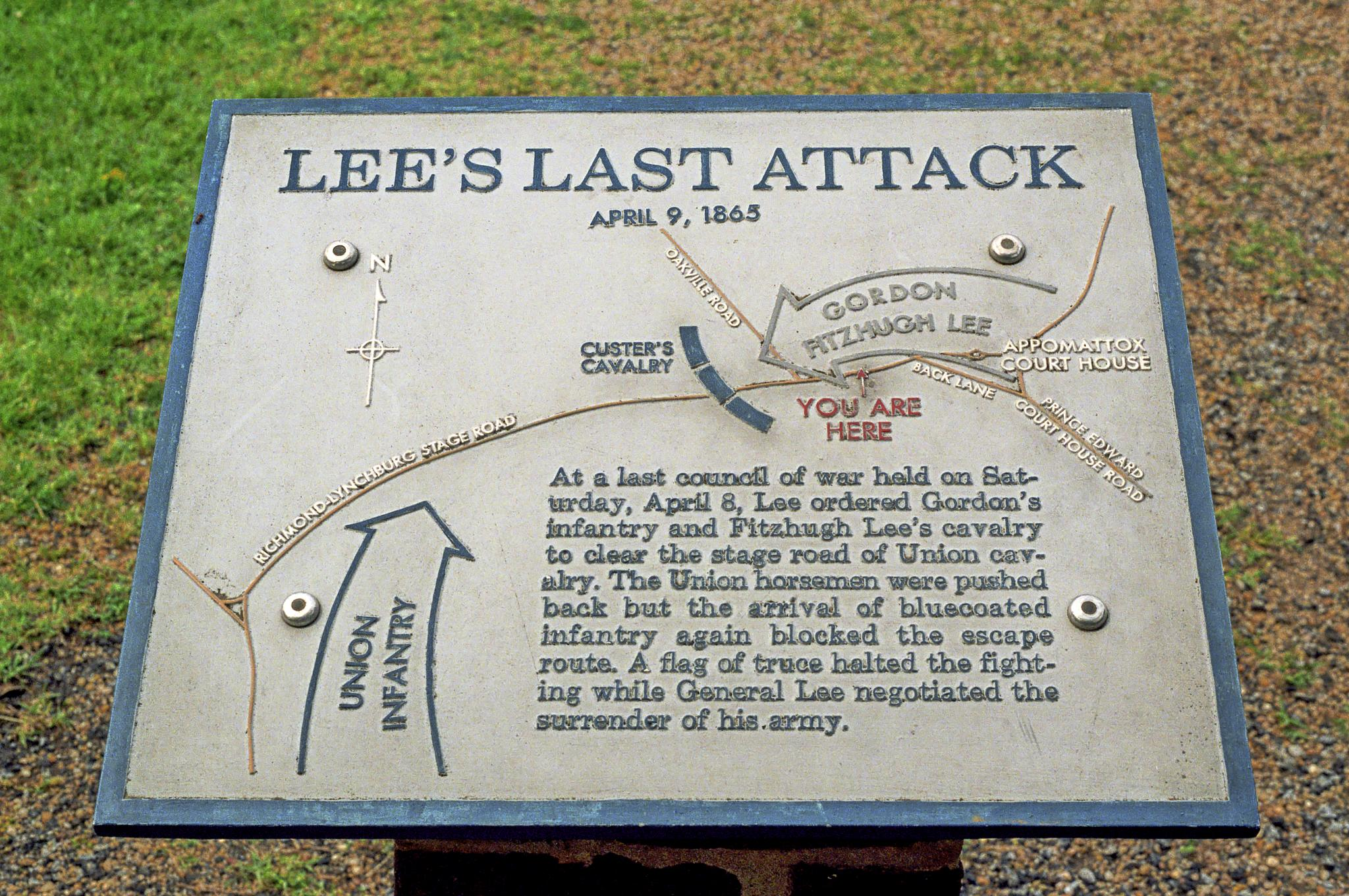

A marker near titled "Lee's Last Attack" says:

"At a last council of war held on Saturday, April 8, Lee ordered Gordon's infantry and Fitzhugh Lee's cavalry to clear the stage road of Union cavalry. The Union horsemen were pushed back but arrival of bluecoated infantry again blocked the escape route. A flag of truce halted the fighting while General Lee negotiated the surrender of his army."

== Description and architecture ==
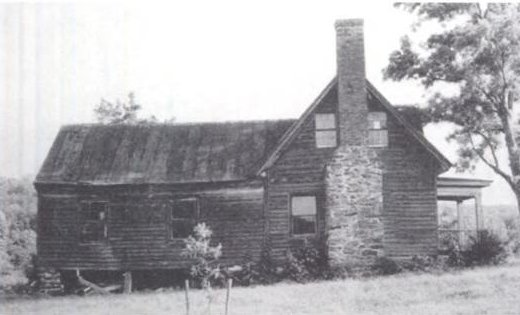
Back addition added after the war

The single story Mariah Wright House is topped with a gable roof and attic. The structure is roughly forty feet deep by eighteen feet wide. The west side of the house has a full length front porch and a central east porch of sixteen and a half feet by seven and a half feet. Both porches are on stone piers with wood shingle shed roofs. The house siding is beaded pine weatherboard.

The Mariah Wright House had an attached kitchen wing added around 1890. In 1965 the National Park Service restored the house, removing the kitchen wing and excavating a basement and full cement foundation. Extensive archeological investigations were conducted at this time and many artifacts were found.

== Sources ==
- Marvel, William, A Place Called Appomattox, UNC Press, 2000, ISBN 0-8078-2568-9
