= Appomattox Court House =

Appomattox Court House may refer to:

- The village of Appomattox Court House, now the Appomattox Court House National Historical Park, in central Virginia (U.S.), where Confederate army commander Robert E. Lee surrendered to Union commander Ulysses S. Grant in the American Civil War.
- The Battle of Appomattox Court House, fought on the morning of April 9, 1865, one of the last battles of the American Civil War.
- The New Appomattox Court House, where locals file lawsuits and do legal business in Appomattox County, Virginia.
- The Old Appomattox Court House, a structure within the Appomattox Court House National Historical Park in Virginia.
