= Clover Hill Tavern =

Historic commercial building in Virginia, United States

- U.S. Historic district – Contributing property
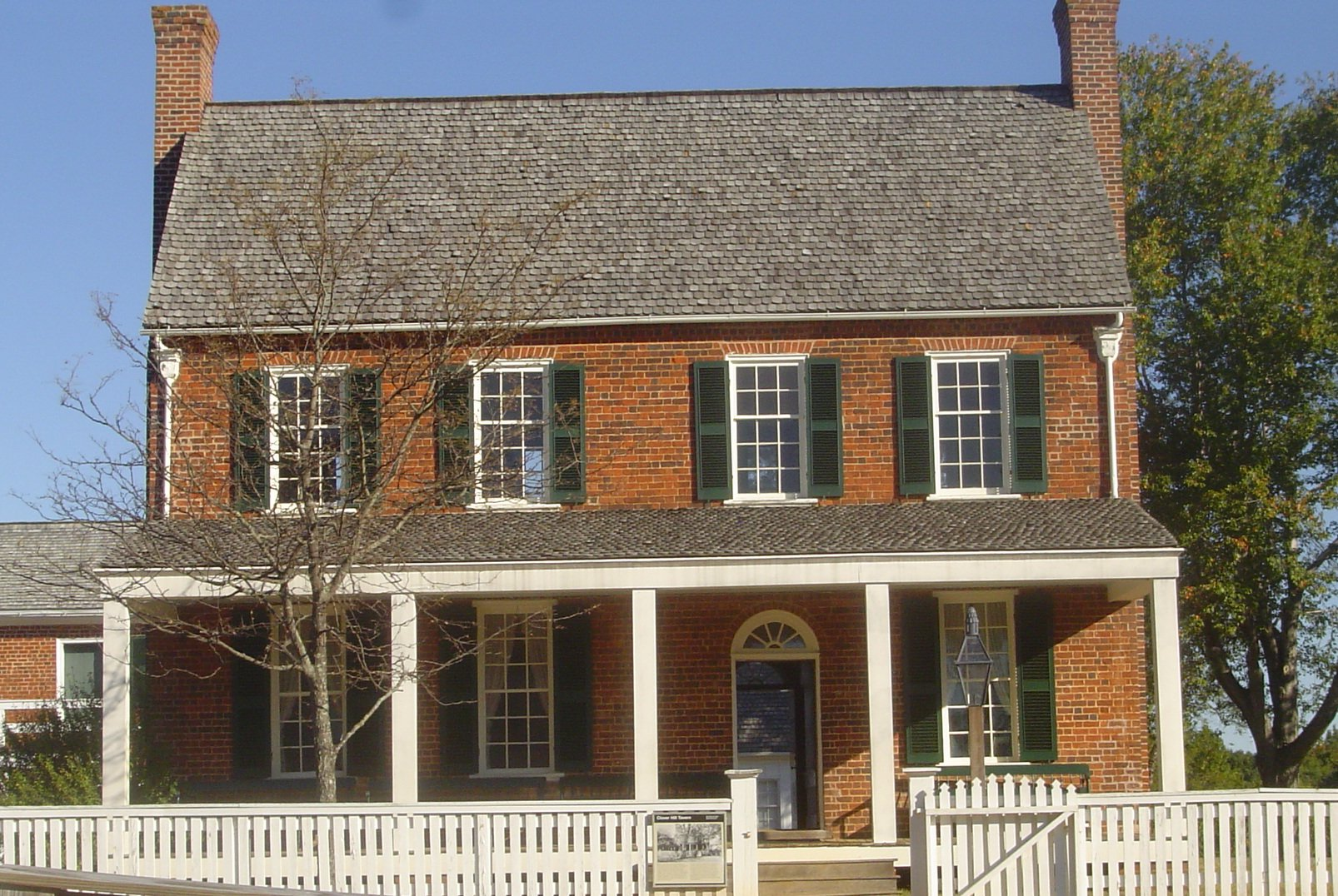
- Clover Hill Tavern

- Location within Virginia Location within the United States
- Location: Appomattox County, Virginia
- Nearest city: Appomattox, Virginia
- Coordinates: 37°22′40.8″N 78°47′45.6″W
- Built: 1819
- Visitation: 102,397 (2019)
- Part of: Appomattox Court House National Historical Park (ID66000827)
- Added to NRHP: October 15, 1966

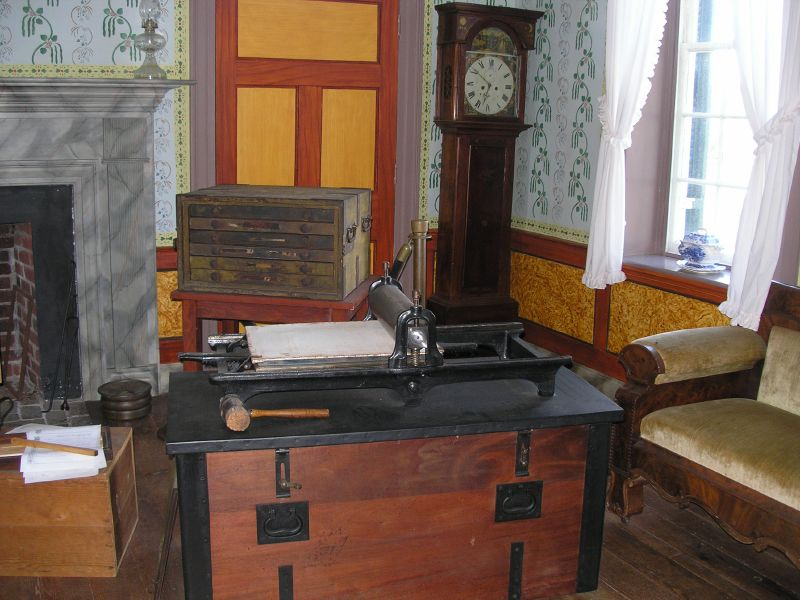
Printing paroles at Clover Hill Tavern

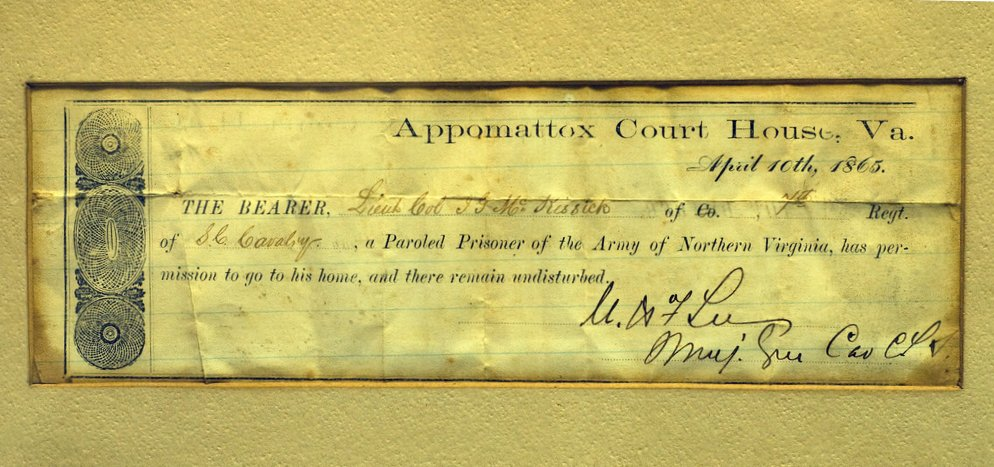
Typical parole pass for a prisoner

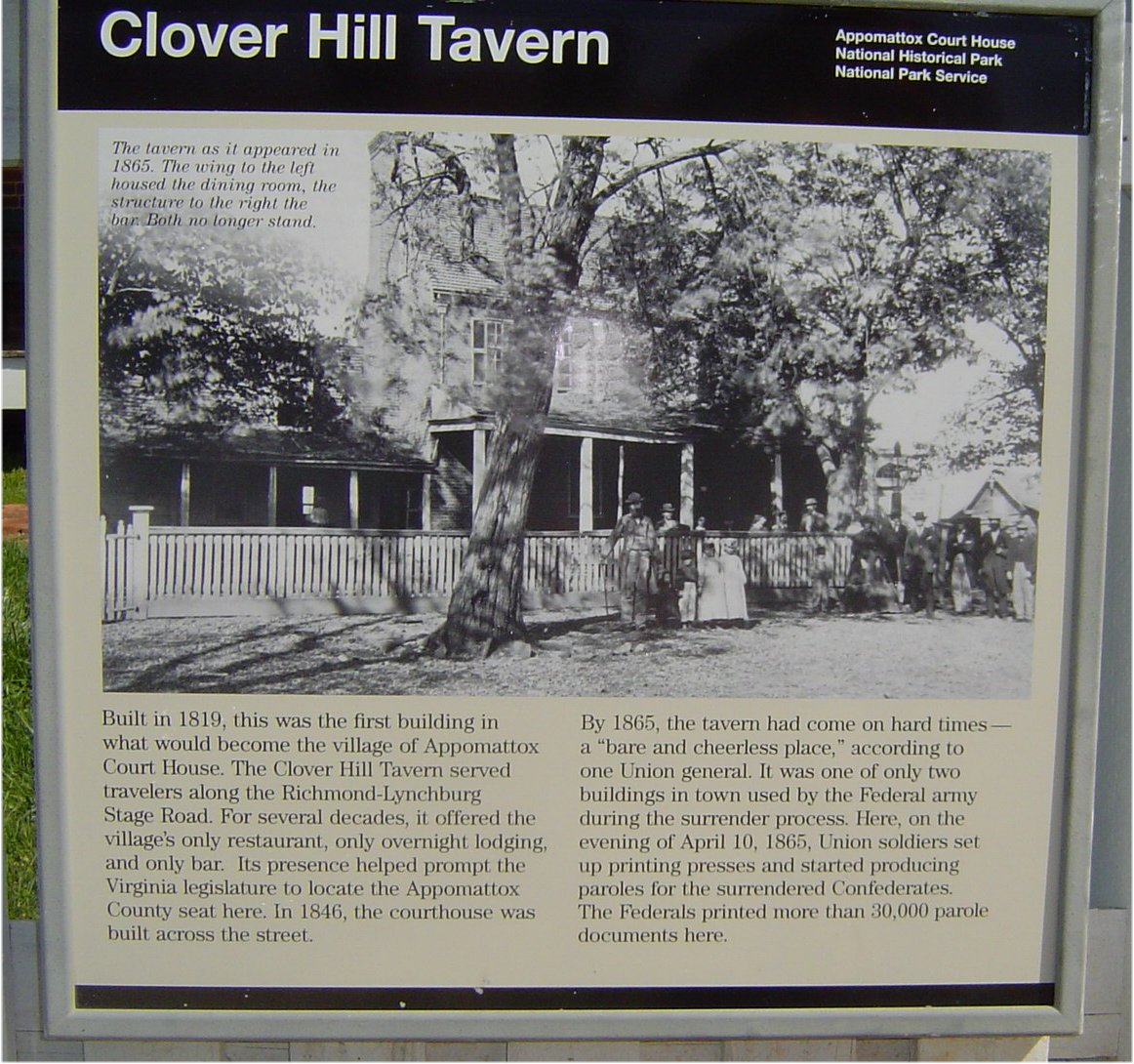
Clover Hill Tavern historical marker

The Clover Hill Tavern with its guest house and slave quarters are structures within the Appomattox Court House National Historical Park in Appomattox County, Virginia. They were registered in the National Park Service's database of Official Structures on October 15, 1966.

The tavern was built by two brothers as a stagecoach stop for the line they started in 1809 between Richmond and Lynchburg, Virginia. They had bought a farm at Clover Hill which was halfway between these town. It came with a small building that served as headquarters for their enterprise. This was expanded into a tavern and a guest house inn for travelers. It was a popular rest stop and prospered, eventually turning into a village.

== History ==
The tavern originally opened in 1819 on the Richmond-Lynchburg Road for travelers and is the oldest original structure in the village of Appomattox Court House, with the exception of the Sweeney Prizery outside of the local of the village but within the Park. The Clover Hill Tavern inn grew and farmhouses grew up around it soon after it opened. It was built by Alexander Patteson and his brother Lilburne Patteson as a stagecoach stop for the line between Cumberland County and Lynchburg.

In 1865, on Palm Sunday, the rapidly approaching end of the Civil War changed the prosperity of the Clover Hill Tavern with the surrender of General Robert E. Lee to General Ulysses S. Grant. The Generals arranged a meeting to be held in town at the McLean House so Lee could formally surrender his troops to Grant, effectively ending the American Civil War. Approximately thirty thousand paroles for the Confederate soldiers were printed in the Clover Hill Tavern.

At the time of General Lee's surrender to Union commander Grant in 1865 the Tavern and its associated outbuildings were owned by Wilson Hix. Billy Hix, Wilson's son, was the sheriff of the village of Appomattox Court House then. Brigadier General George H. Sharpe, as head of the Bureau of Military Information and Assistant Provost Marshal, made the Clover Hill Tavern his headquarters starting on April 10, 1865. Sharpe was designated by Grant to oversee the printing of parole passes which were issued to the Confederate veterans. Research by historians of the Park reveal that perhaps the paroles were printed in the wooden dining room wing at the west end of the Tavern that no longer is there. The paroles allowed the surrendered Confederate soldiers to travel unmolested to their homes.

A National Park Service marker at the front entrance of the Clover Hill Tavern reads:

Built in 1819, this was the first building in what would become the village of Appomattox Court House. The Clover Hill Tavern served travelers along the Richmond-Lynchburg Stage Road. For several decades, it offered the village’s only restaurant, only overnight lodging, and only bar. Its presence helped prompt the Virginia legislature to locate the Appomattox County seat here. In 1846, the courthouse was built across the street. By 1865, the tavern had come on hard times – a "bare and cheerless place", according to one Union general. It was one of only two buildings in town used by the Federal army during the surrender process. Here, on the evening of April 10, 1865, Union soldiers set up printing presses and started producing paroles for the surrendered Confederates. The Federals printed more than 30,000 parole documents here.

== Historical significance ==
The Clover Hill Tavern with its guest house and slave quarters have special meaning in American history as designated by the National Park Service under their criteria by embodying the distinctive characteristics of a type, period, and method of construction in the mid nineteenth century. The buildings and resources constitute a typical farming community of Virginia as well as a government seat (county "court house" seat) of the nineteenth century in the United States. They were all registered and documented in the National Register of Historic Places on October 15, 1966.

== Physical description ==
The Clover Hill Tavern is constructed of local brick laid in a Flemish bond. The two-story structure has a full attic. It is thirty-nine feet (12 m) wide by twenty-three feet (7.0 m) deep. The south facade is four-bays with a full-length porch. Brick foundation piers support the porch.

The wood shingle roofs cover both the porch and building. The wood shingle roof on the main building is supported by a corbelled brick cornice. The gable ends have rakes with dentils. The east and west gable ends have external, centered, brick chimneys. The wood paneled doors have fan lights above are found on the south and west sides. There is original stenciling and painting exposed on the plaster in the western room stair enclosure. There is evidence of graining on all the interior trim.

The Clover Hill Tavern structure has four bays on each floor. It has a full length porch on the first floor which is supported on brick foundation piers. The windows are non-operable louvered with two panels. The west side has an entrance with the south side being the main entrance. The rear of the building is identical to the front, except in reverse. The building has a full attic and no cellar. The Clover Hill Tavern was restored in 1954 by the Park.

== Guest house and kitchen ==
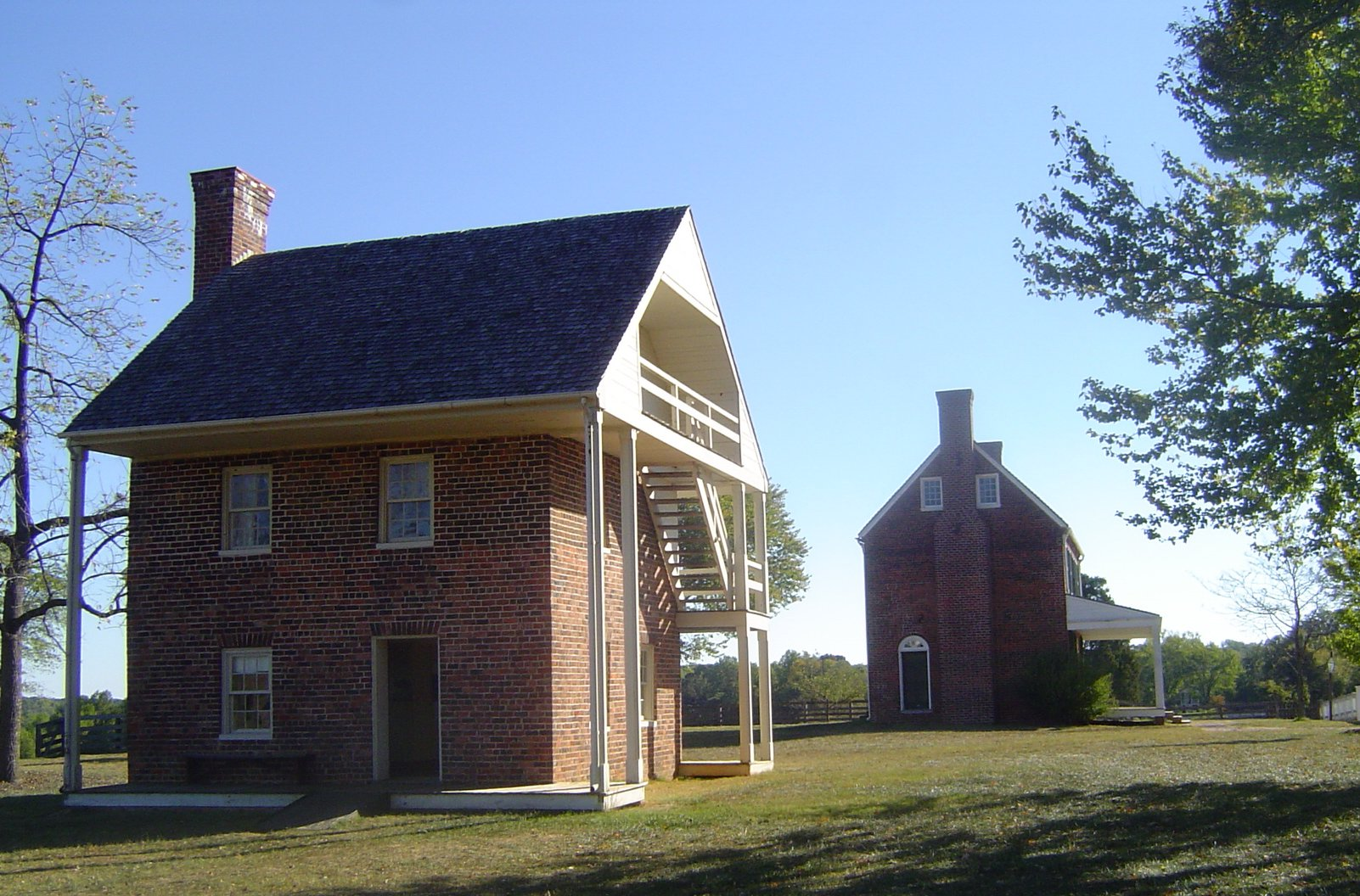
Clover Hill Tavern guest house

The guest house building was reconstructed and renovated in 1954 and rehabilitated in 1997.

The self-standing separate structure is located northwest of the Clover Hill Tavern, which was refurbished in 1953. The first floor was an additional kitchen and the second story was used for additional guest rooms. It is thirty-two feet (9.8 m) wide and eighteen feet (5.5 m) deep. It has a full finish attic, but no cellar.

The south side has four bay windows on the second floor with two board and batten doors at the center flanked sash windows. The first floor has three bay windows with two board and batten doors with one sash window at the west end. There are steps to the second porch at the east end of the first floor. The gable end elevations have centered projecting chimneys with no openings. There are two rooms on each of the first two stories. There is a huge fireplace in the bigger room on the first floor. The fireplace has an original iron crane and no trim nor mantel. The other room on the first floor also has a fireplace. The baseboards in the rooms are almost six inches high and come with a quirk bead. There is only an exterior staircase to the upper stories. A wood shingle gable roof with a box cornice covers the 3-story guest house structure.

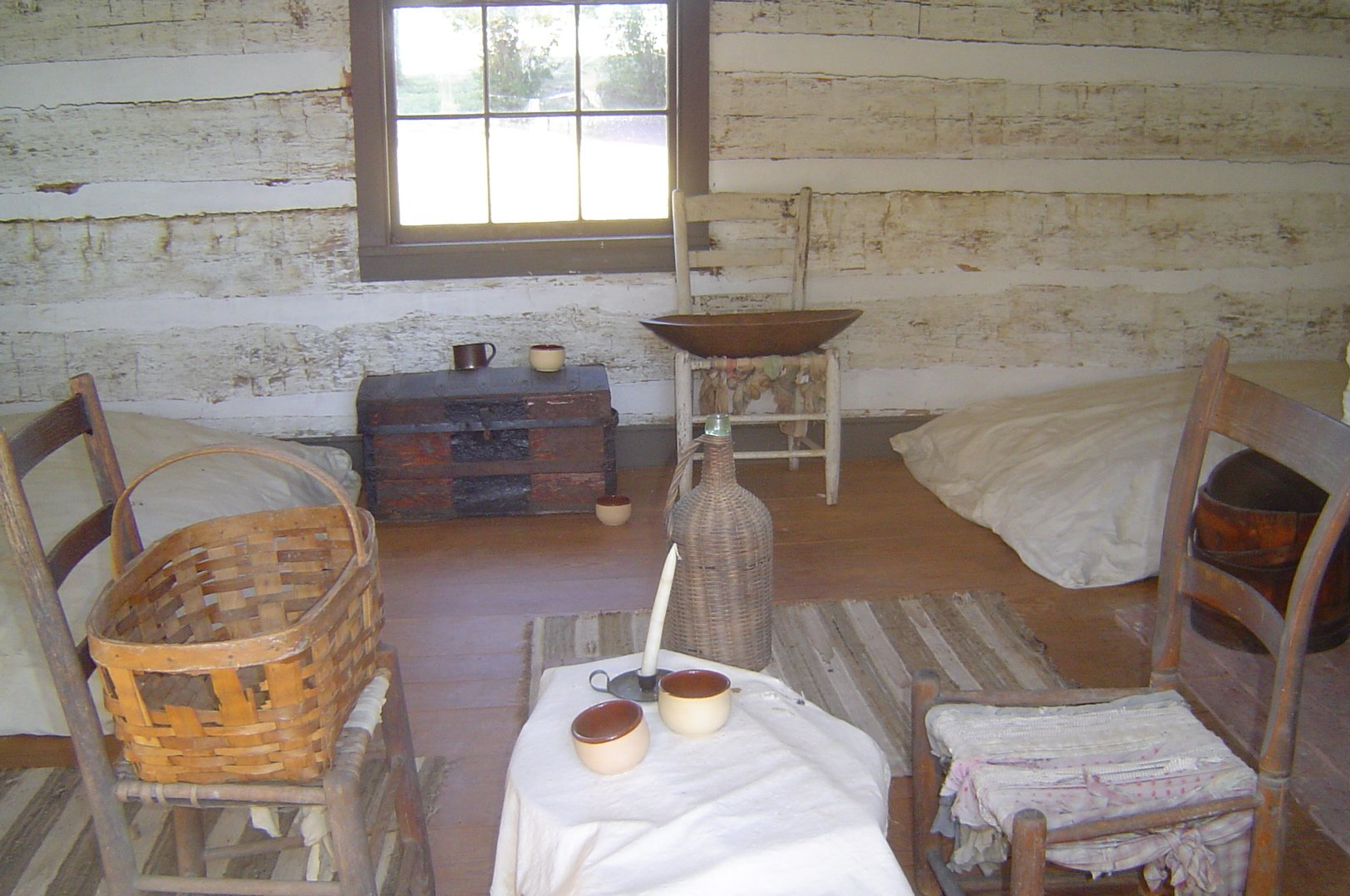
Inside slave quarters

== Clover Hill Tavern slave quarters ==
The Clover Hill Tavern slave quarters is a single-story frame cabin with an attic that was originally constructed in 1819. It is fifteen feet (4.6 m) wide by twenty-eight feet (8.5 m) deep. It is four bays with a central fireplace and chimney. The cabin is sheathed in random board and batten. The roof is square-butt wood shingles and finished with plain box cornices and rake boards.

The slave quarters contributes to the Tavern and the Clover Hill village scene as it was at the time of the surrender of General Lee to General Grant in 1865. The present structure is a reconstruction of the 1819 slave quarters that was rebuilt in 1954.
