= Sweeney Prizery =

- U.S. Historic district – Contributing property
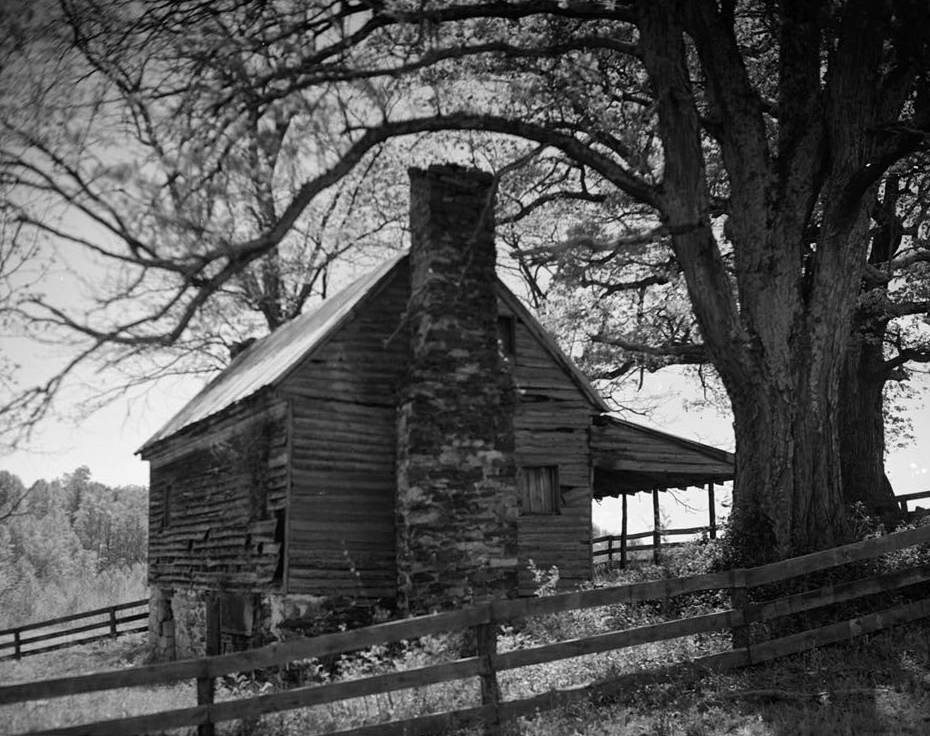
- Sweeney Prizery
- Location: Appomattox County, Virginia
- Nearest city: Appomattox, Virginia
- Built: ca. 1790s
- Part of: Appomattox Court House National Historical Park (ID66000827)
- Added to NRHP: October 15, 1966

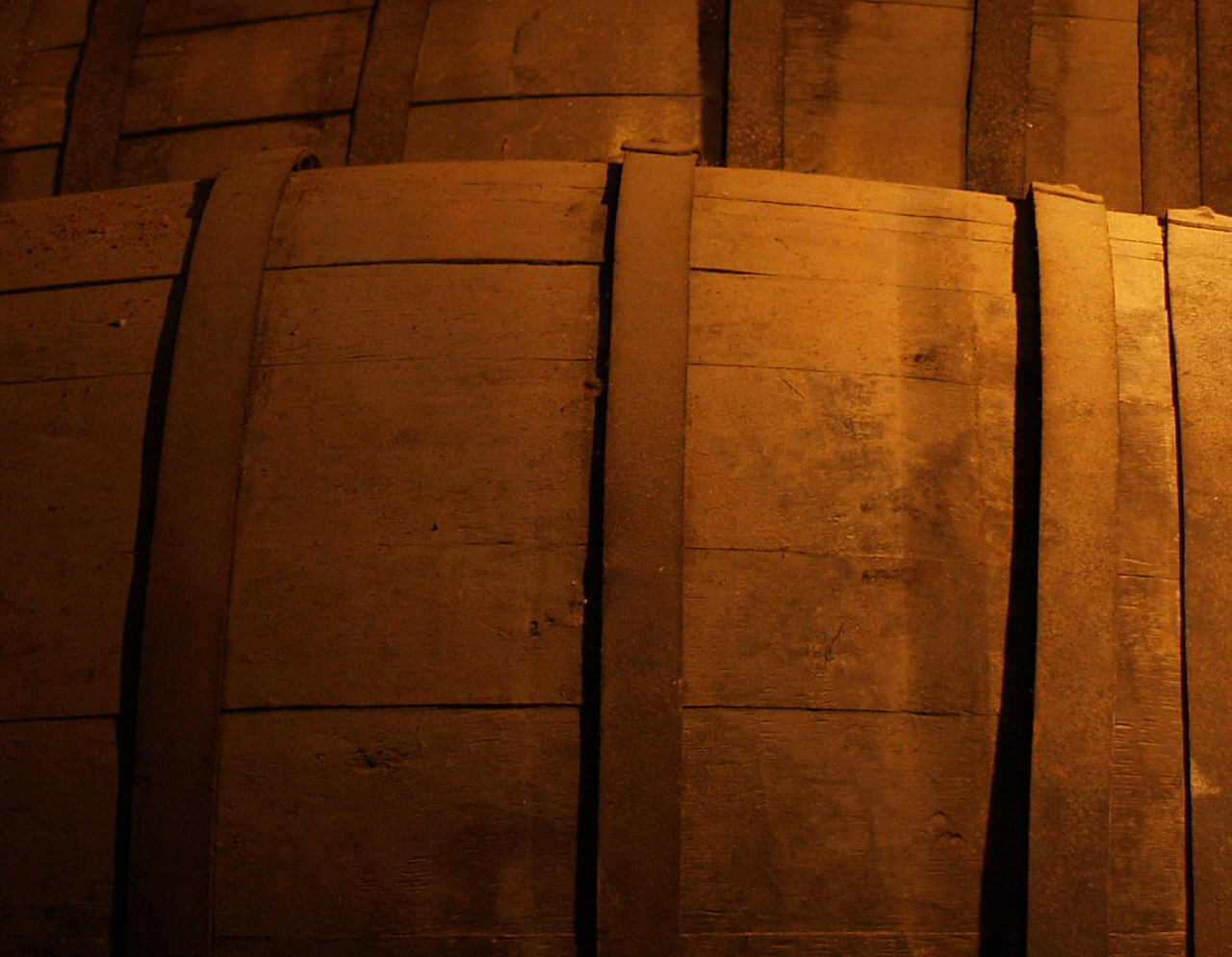
Hogshead

The Sweeney Prizery is a structure within the Appomattox Court House National Historical Park. It was registered in the National Park Service's database of Official Structures on June 26, 1989.

== History ==
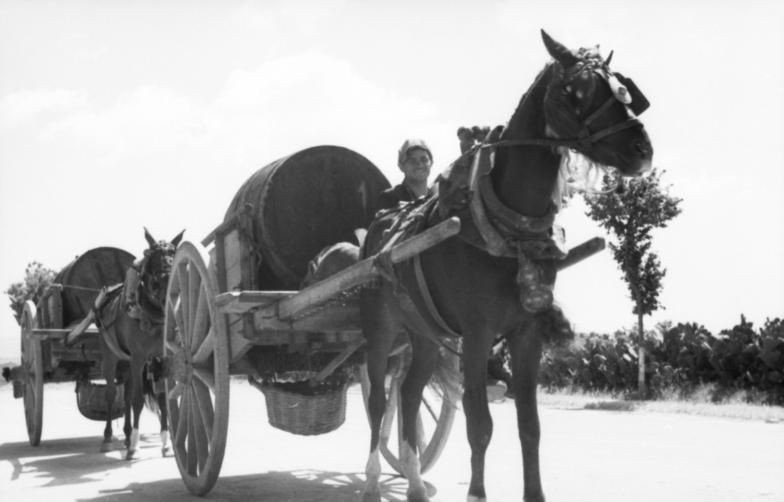
Transporting goods in hogsheads

This building, constructed around the year 1790, is the oldest structure in the Appomattox Court House National Historical Park. The Sweeney prizery was built primarily as a residence for Alexander Sweeney and the cellar used as a prizery for his business. By 1865, it was owned by Joel Flood. Prizeries were structures in which hogsheads of tobacco were stored after the tobacco was packed, a process known as prizing.

The prizery is considered significant both due to its representation of the characteristics of a tobacco prizery and for its association with the surrender at Appomattox Court House.

== Physical description ==
The Sweeney prizery (tobacco packing house) is a single story structure with a loft and full cellar. It was built to serve as both a prizery and as a residence. It is about thirty six feet wide by sixteen feet deep. The prizery is built into a bank. The building has a foundation of rough-hewn sandstone that makes up the cellar walls. There is board sheathing on the inside of the exterior weatherboards.

There are only three openings from the exterior to the cellar, all of which are on the southeast side. Two are the remains of doors and the other is a casement opening. There are two external chimneys, one at each gable end. While the ceiling supports have been whitewashed, the ceilings themselves are not plastered. Openings for two doors are present on the first floor of the northwest side of the structure.

Pictures of the Sweeney prizery as it looked in 1959.

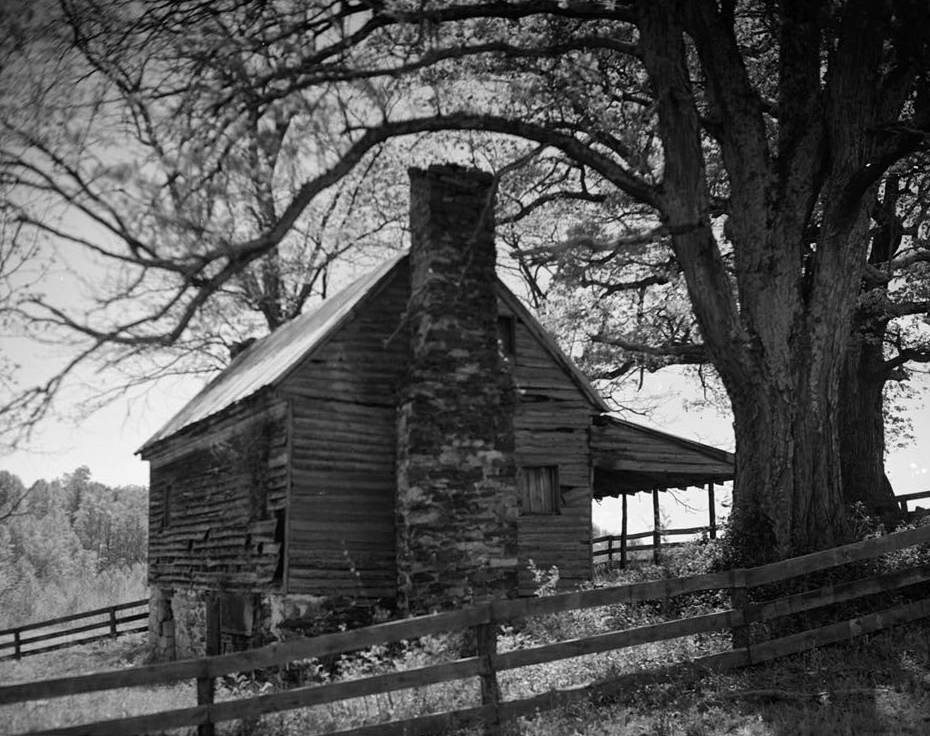
west elevation

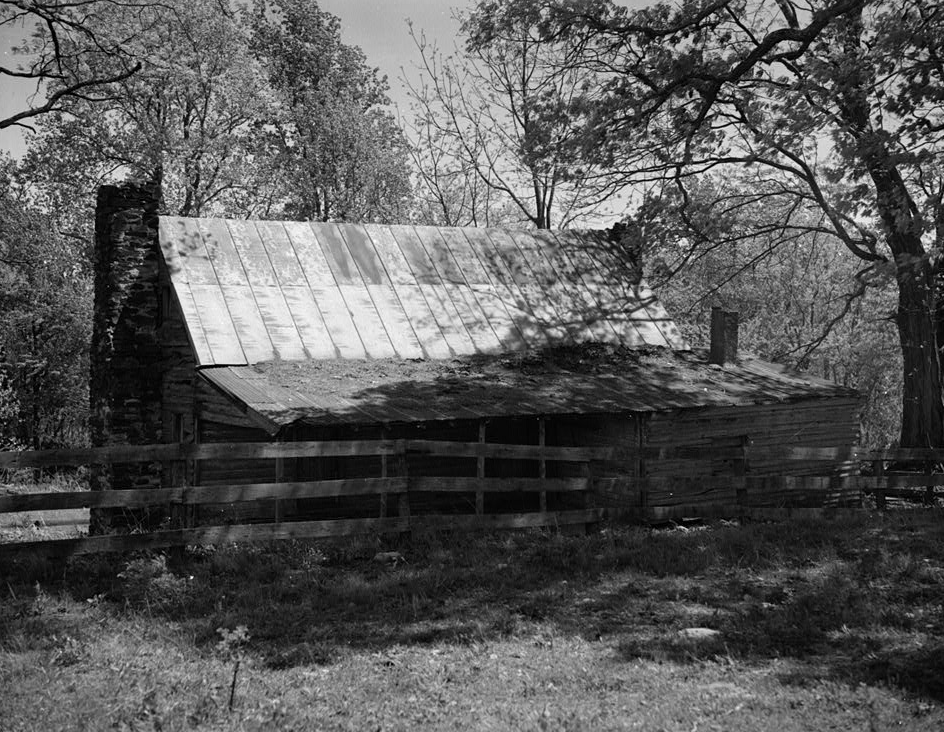
north (front) elevation

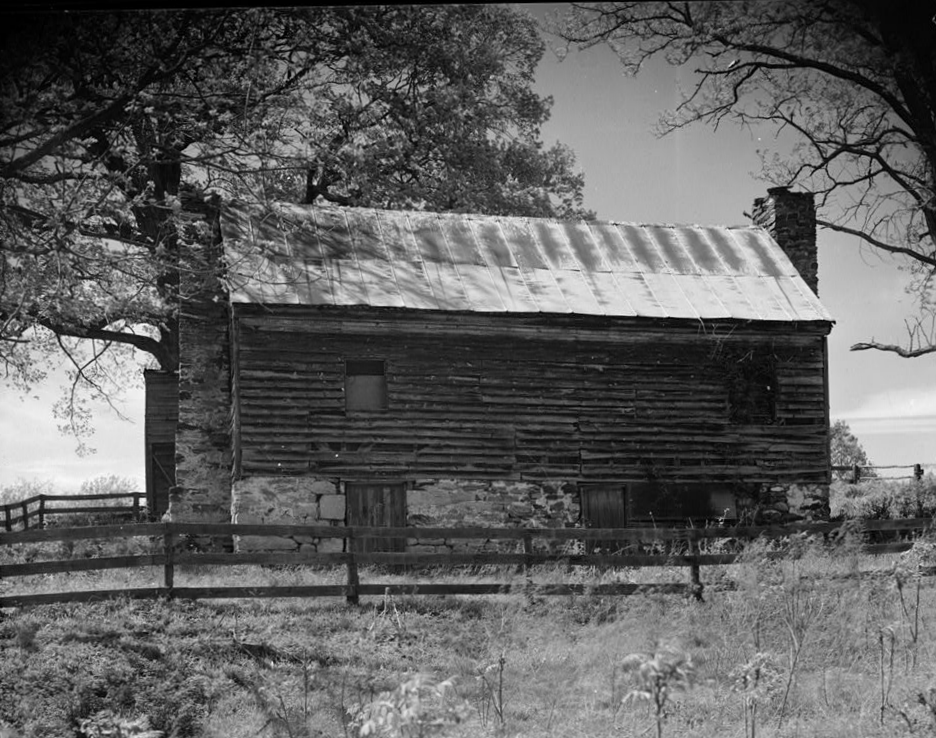
south elevation

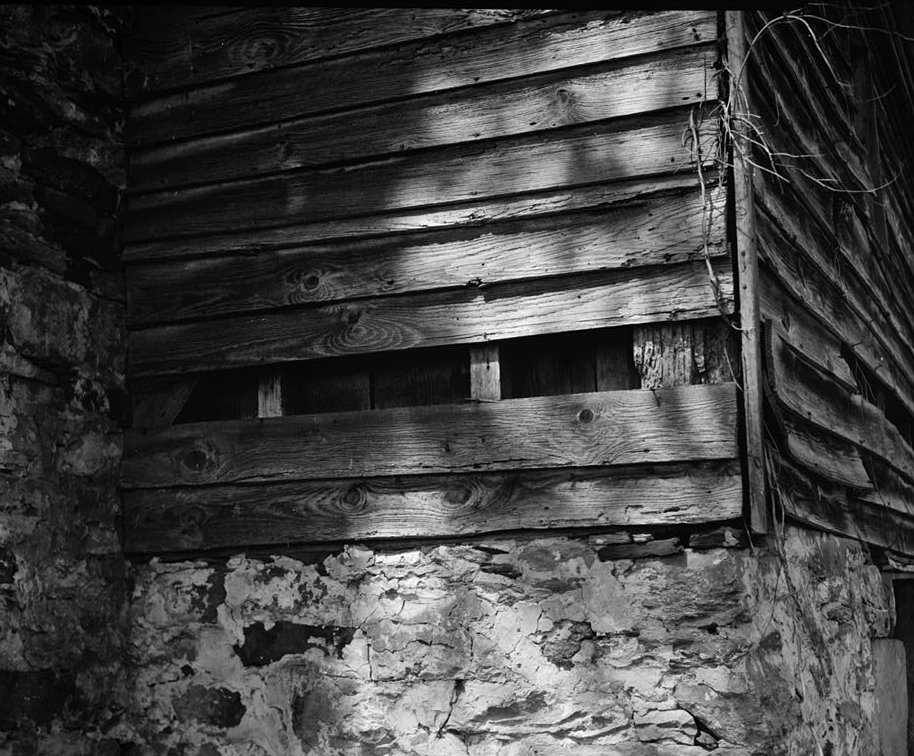
wood clapboarding

== Footnotes ==
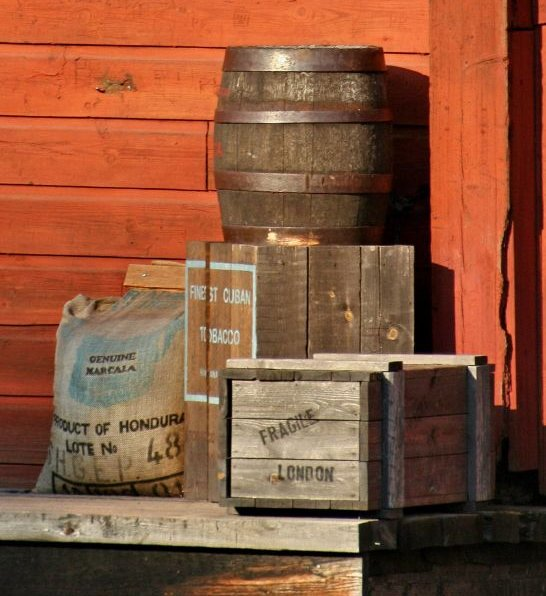
Coffee, Tobacco & Dynamite

== Sources ==
- Bradford, Ned, Battles and Leaders of the Civil War, Plume, 1989
- Catton, Bruce, A Stillness at Appomattox, Doubleday 1953, Library of Congress # 53-9982, ISBN 0-385-04451-8
- Catton, Bruce, This Hallowed Ground, Doubleday 1953, Library of Congress # 56-5960
- Chaffin, Tom, 2006. Sea of Gray: The Around-the-World Odyssey of the Confederate Raider Shenandoah, Hill and Wang/Farrar, Straus and Giroux,.
- Davis, Burke, The Civil War: Strange & Fascinating Facts, Wings Books, 1960 & 1982, ISBN 0-517-37151-0
- Davis, Burke, To Appomattox - Nine April Days, 1865, Eastern Acorn Press, 1992, ISBN 0-915992-17-5
- Featherston, Nathaniel Ragland, Appomattox County History and Genealogy, Genealogical Publishing Company, 1998, ISBN 0-8063-4760-0
- Gutek, Patricia, Plantations and Outdoor Museums in America's Historic South, University of South Carolina Press, 1996, ISBN 1-57003-071-5
- Hosmer, Charles Bridgham, Preservation Comes of Age: From Williamsburg to the National Trust, 1926-1949, Preservation Press, National Trust for Historic Preservation in the United States by the University Press of Virginia, 1981
- Kaiser, Harvey H., The National Park Architecture Sourcebook, Princeton Architectural Press, 2008, ISBN 1-56898-742-0
- Kennedy, Frances H., The Civil War Battlefield Guide, Houghton Mifflin Company, 1990, ISBN 0-395-52282-X
- Korn, Jerry et al., The Civil War, Pursuit to Appomattox, The Last Battles, Time-Life Books, 1987, ISBN 0-8094-4788-6
- Marvel, William, A Place Called Appomattox, UNC Press, 2000, ISBN 0-8078-2568-9
- Marvel, William, Lee's Last Retreat, UNC Press, 2006, ISBN 0-8078-5703-3
- McPherson, James M., Battle Cry of Freedom, Oxford University Press, 1988,
- National Park Service, Appomattox Court House: Appomattox Court House National Historical Park, Virginia, U.S. Dept. of the Interior, 2002, ISBN 0-912627-70-0
- Scott, Kay W., Guide to the National Park Areas: Eastern States, 8th: Eastern States, Globe Pequot, 2004, ISBN 0-7627-2988-0
- Tidwell, William A., April '65: Confederate Covert Action in the American Civil War, Kent State University Press, 1995, ISBN 0-87338-515-2
- Weigley, Russel F., A Great Civil War: A Military and Political History, 1861-1865, Indiana University Press, 2000, ISBN 0-253-33738-0
- Underwriter Printing and Publishing Company, The Weekly Underwriter, 1910
- Unrau, Harlan D, National Park Service, Denver Service Center, Historic Structure Report, Historical Data Section: The "Sweeney Prizery", Appomattox Court House National Historical Park, Appomattox, Virginia; Package No. 103 (project Type 35), U.S. Dept. of the Interior, National Park Service, Denver Service Center, 1981
- United States Government Printing Office, Department of the Interior and Related Agencies Appropriations for 1978: Hearings Before a Subcommittee of the Committee on Appropriations, House of Representatives, Ninety-fifth Congress, First Session, 1977.
- United States National Park Service. Division of Publications, Appomattox Court House: Appomattox Court House National Historical Park, Virginia, published by U.S. Department of the Interior, 2002, ISBN 0-912627-70-0
