= Old Appomattox Court House =

Historic courthouse in Virginia, US

- U.S. Historic district – Contributing property
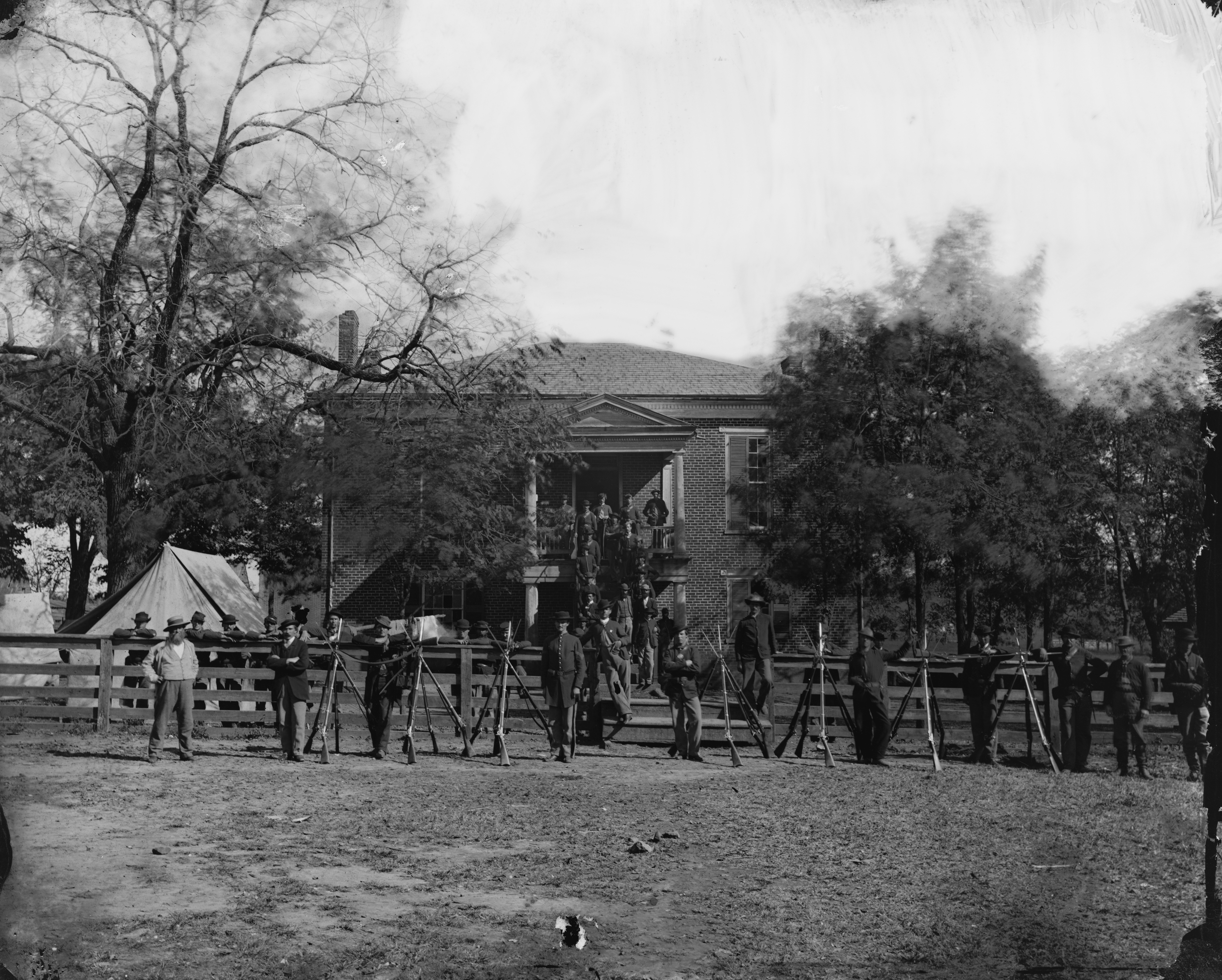
- Federal soldiers at old "court house" in April 1865

- Location within Virginia Location within the United States
- Location: Appomattox County, Virginia
- Nearest city: Appomattox, Virginia
- Coordinates: 37°22′39″N 78°47′46″W
- Built: 1846, rebuilt in 1963-1964
- Visitation: 186,526 (average 2013-2022)
- Part of: Appomattox Court House National Historical Park (ID66000827)
- Added to NRHP: June 26, 1989

The Old Appomattox Court House is a former county courthouse within the Appomattox Court House National Historical Park. In the 1800s this structure gave the surrounding village its name, Appomattox Court House. Built in 1846, the structure served as the courthouse for Appomattox County, Virginia. Confederate General Robert E. Lee surrendered his army nearby in 1865, during the closing stages of the American Civil War, but the courthouse was closed that day and was not used in the proceedings. The village where the old courthouse was located had entered a state of decline in the 1850s after being bypassed by a railroad, and when the courthouse burned down in 1892, the county government was moved to Appomattox, Virginia.

Rebuilt in 1963 and 1964, the structure now serves as the visitor center for Appomattox Court House National Historical Park. It was added to the National Register of Historic Places in 1989. As rebuilt, the courthouse is a two-story building with brick walls, a concrete foundation, and a tin roof.

== History ==
In 1845, Appomattox County, Virginia, was established. The county seat was the village of Clover Hill, where the government buildings were to be constructed. The contract for the construction of the courthouse was given to the lowest bidder, whose name is lost to history. Built largely in the Georgian style with elements of Greek Revival design, the courthouse was two stories tall and made from brick. When Confederate military officer Robert E. Lee surrendered to Federal forces at Appommattox in the final days of the American Civil War, the courthouse was closed and was not used in the proceedings. For some time, the village had been in decline after it was bypassed by a railroad in the 1850s, and when the courthouse burned in 1892, the county government was moved to what is now known as Appomattox, Virginia.

In 1963 and 1964, the courthouse was rebuilt, and it is now the visitor center for Appomattox Court House National Historical Park. Additional work to the building occurred in 1986, 1995, and 2001. The building was listed on the National Register of Historic Places on June 26, 1989.

== Description ==
As rebuilt, the courthouse is still two-stories tall. Its walls are made from brick, with a concrete foundation and a tin roof. Overall dimensions are 50 feet (15 m) by 40 feet (12 m). On the second story are porches, which are reached from the ground by flights of stone stairs. The second story is the main floor, and doors lead from the porches to the inside of the building. The roof is a hip roof and is supported by a cornice. A chimney is located on either end of the building. The building's windows have wooden lintels and sills made from limestone. The shutters on the windows are non-operable.

== Sources ==
- Marvel, William (2000). A Place Called Appomattox. UNC Press. ISBN 0-8078-2568-9.
- Montgomery, Jon B. (1989). "National Register of Historic Places Registration Form: Appomattox Court House National Historical Park".
