= Appomattox Court House National Historical Park =

Historic area in Virginia, US

- U.S. National Register of Historic Places
- U.S. Historic district
- U.S. National Historical Park
- Virginia Landmarks Register
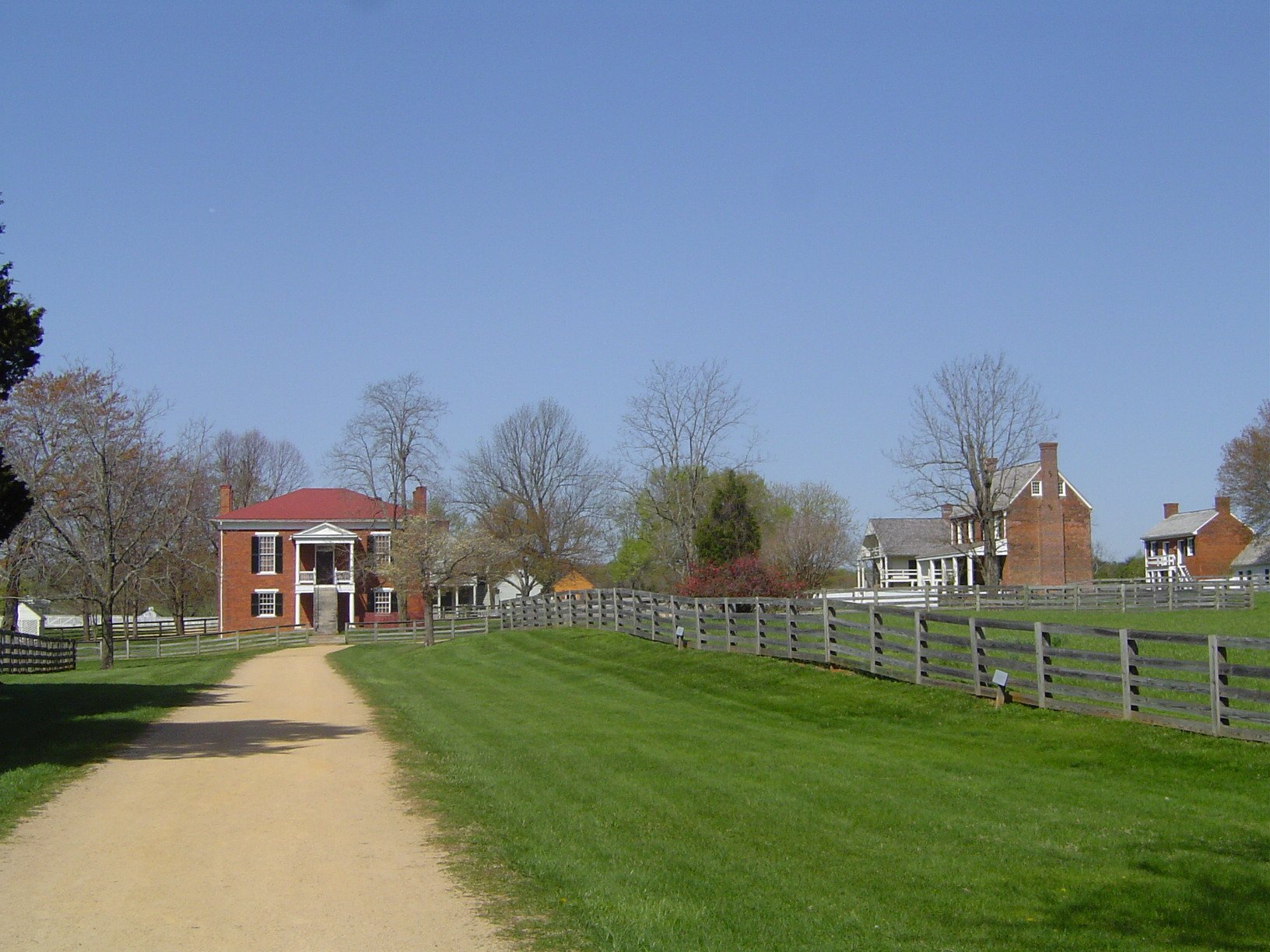
- Appomattox Court House National Historical Park. The Old Appomattox Court House is at left; the reconstructed McLean House, the site of the formal surrender, is at right.

- Location within Virginia Location within the United States
- Location: Appomattox County, Virginia
- Nearest city: Appomattox, Virginia
- Coordinates: 37°22′39″N 78°47′45.6″W
- Area: 1,774.6 acres (718.2 ha)
- Visitation: 92,650 (2021)
- Website: Official website
- NRHP reference No.: 66000827
- VLR No.: 006-0033

Significant dates
- Added to NRHP: October 15, 1966
- Designated VLR: July 6, 1971

The Appomattox Court House National Historical Park is the preserved 19th-century village named Appomattox Court House in Appomattox County, Virginia. The village was named for the presence nearby of what is now preserved as the Old Appomattox Court House. The village is the site of the Battle of Appomattox Court House, and contains the McLean House, where the surrender of the Army of Northern Virginia under Robert E. Lee to Union commander Ulysses S. Grant took place on April 9, 1865, commencing the end of the American Civil War. The village itself began as the community of Clover Hill, which was made the county seat of Appomattox County in the 1840s. The village of Appomattox Court House entered a stage of decline after it was bypassed by a railroad in 1854. In 1930, the United States War Department was authorized to erect a monument at the site, and in 1933 the War Department's holdings there were transferred to the National Park Service. The site was greatly enlarged in 1935, and a restoration of the McLean House was planned but was delayed by World War II. In 1949, the restored McLean House was reopened to the public. Several restored buildings (including the McLean House and the courthouse), as well as a number of original 19th-century structures are situated at the site.

== Antebellum history ==
The antebellum village started out as "Clover Hill". The village was a stop along the Richmond–Lynchburg stagecoach road. It was also the site of organizational meetings, so when Appomattox County was established by an Act on February 8, 1845, Clover Hill village became the county seat. Appomattox County was formed from parts of Buckingham, Prince Edward, Charlotte, and Campbell counties. The jurisdiction took its name from the headwaters that emanate there, the Appomattox River; the name Appomattox was believed to originate with the Apumetec tribe of Native Americans.

From about 1842, Hugh Raine owned most of the Clover Hill area. He obtained it from his brother John Raine who defaulted on his loans. Following the establishment of Appomattox County, it became the county seat and 30 acres (12 ha) of the hamlet were divided into town lots. The state designated 2 acres (0.81 ha) to be taken as a location for county government buildings. The courthouse was to be built across the Stage Road from the Clover Hill Tavern's stable, with the jail behind the courthouse. In late 1845, Hugh Raine and another of his brothers sold the Clover Hill area to Samuel D. McDearmon. McDearmon attempted to sell the lots in Clover Hill, but with little success. While the village did grow, in 1854, the decision to route a railroad through nearby Appomattox Depot led to many businesses leaving Appomattox Court House for the Appomattox Depot area. Around the same time, the stage route into Appomattox Court House was discontinued, and the village entered a decline.

== Civil War and further decline ==
In early April 1865, during the end of the American Civil War, Confederate States Army forces commanded by General Robert E. Lee were being pursued by Union Army troops commanded by Lieutenant General Ulysses S. Grant. Trapped at Appomattox Court House, Lee's troops attacked on April 9 in the Battle of Appomattox Court House, but were unsuccessful. That day, Lee met with Grant to discuss terms of surrender at the McLean House. After discussion, Lee signed surrender terms that day, and on April 12, the Confederate Army of Northern Virginia laid down its arms and marched away. While the war continued after the surrender of Lee's army, the surrender at Appomattox Court House has become widely symbolic of the defeat of the Confederacy. The war's end did not stop the decline of the village, and when the county's records were destroyed in an 1892 courthouse fire, it was decided to move the county seat to the railroad community at Appomattox Depot, which became the town of Appomattox.

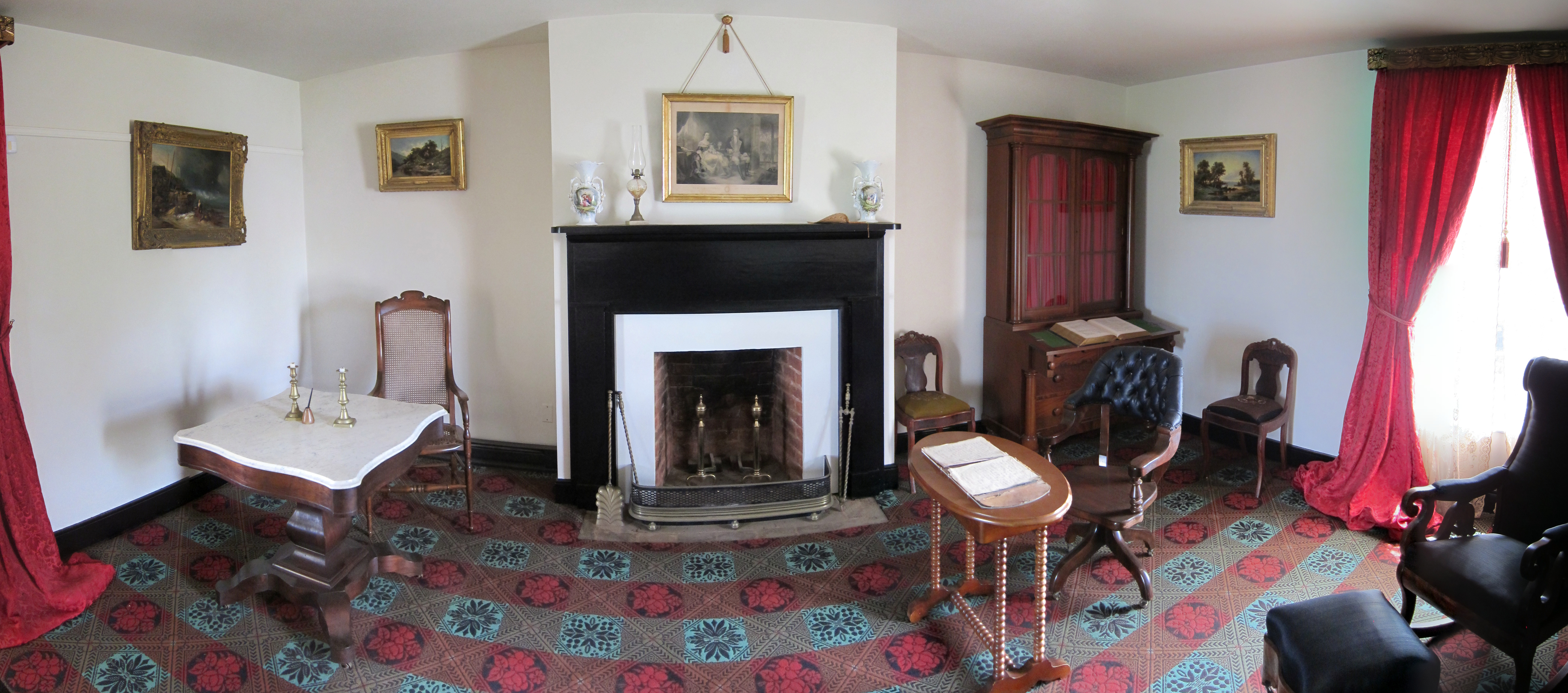
Panoramic image of reconstructed parlor of the McLean House, site of surrender of General Robert E. Lee at the end of the American Civil War

== Park development history ==
In 1892, after the courthouse had burned and the McLean House had been dismantled, George B. Davis learned of the deteriorating state of the village and received permission to have metal tablets placed at the locations of important historic sites at the village. In 1930, the United States Congress passed legislation to have the United States War Department acquire a site at the village for a monument relating to the 1865 surrender, and three years later, the War Department's holdings at Appomattox Court House were transferred to the National Park Service. The site's name was changed from the "Appomattox Battlefield Site" to "Appomattox Court House National Historical Monument" in 1935 as part of legislation that authorized the park to be increased in size and for the McLean House to be reconstructed; the name change to "Appomattox Court House National Historical Park" occurred in 1954. In 1940, the park was increased to 970 acres (390 ha), and a plan to rebuild both the courthouse and the McLean House was formalized. World War II delayed reconstruction at the site, but in 1949, the restored McLean House was opened to the public. On October 15, 1966, the park was listed on the National Register of Historic Places. The village itself has since been restored by the National Park Service, with a number of original 19th-century structures remaining, including the Clover Hill Tavern.

Besides the surviving original structures, the roughly 1,700-acre (690 ha) park contains reconstructed historic buildings as well, including the McLean House. Both a driving tour path and hiking trails are present in the park. Points of interest along the trails include interpretive signage, the location of Lee's headquarters, and an artillery park including cannons. The park's visitor center is located in the rebuilt courthouse.

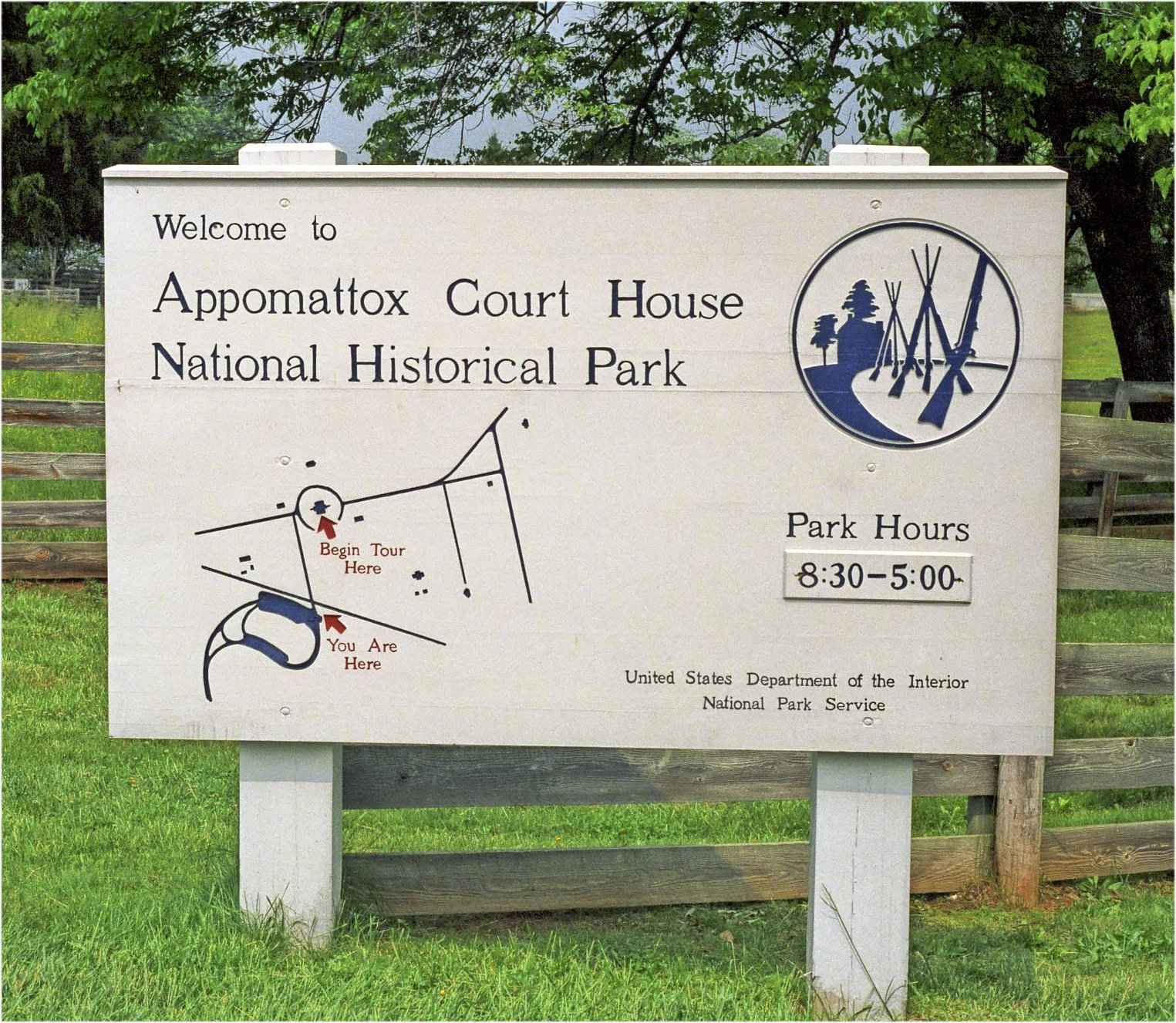
Appomattox Park main welcome entrance sign

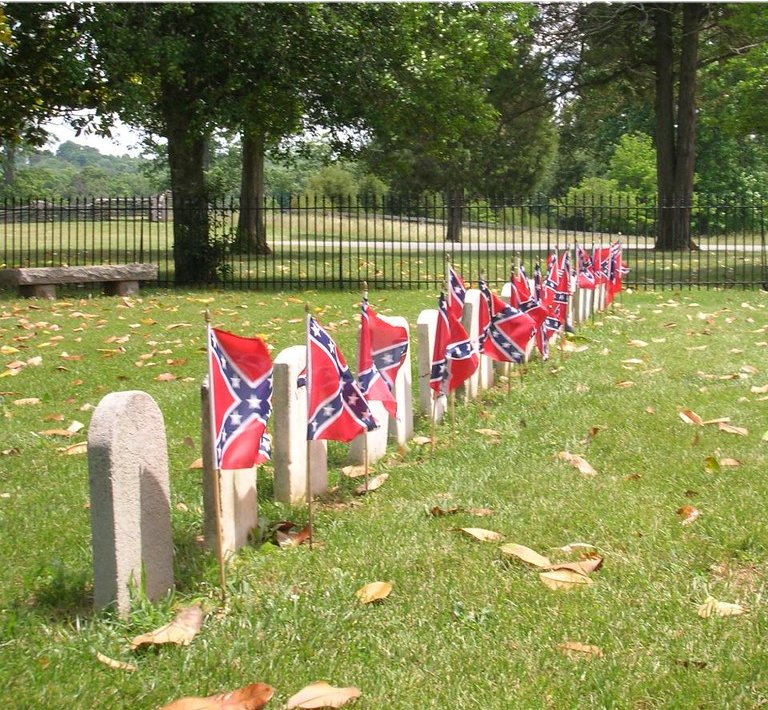
Confederate Cemetery at the historical park

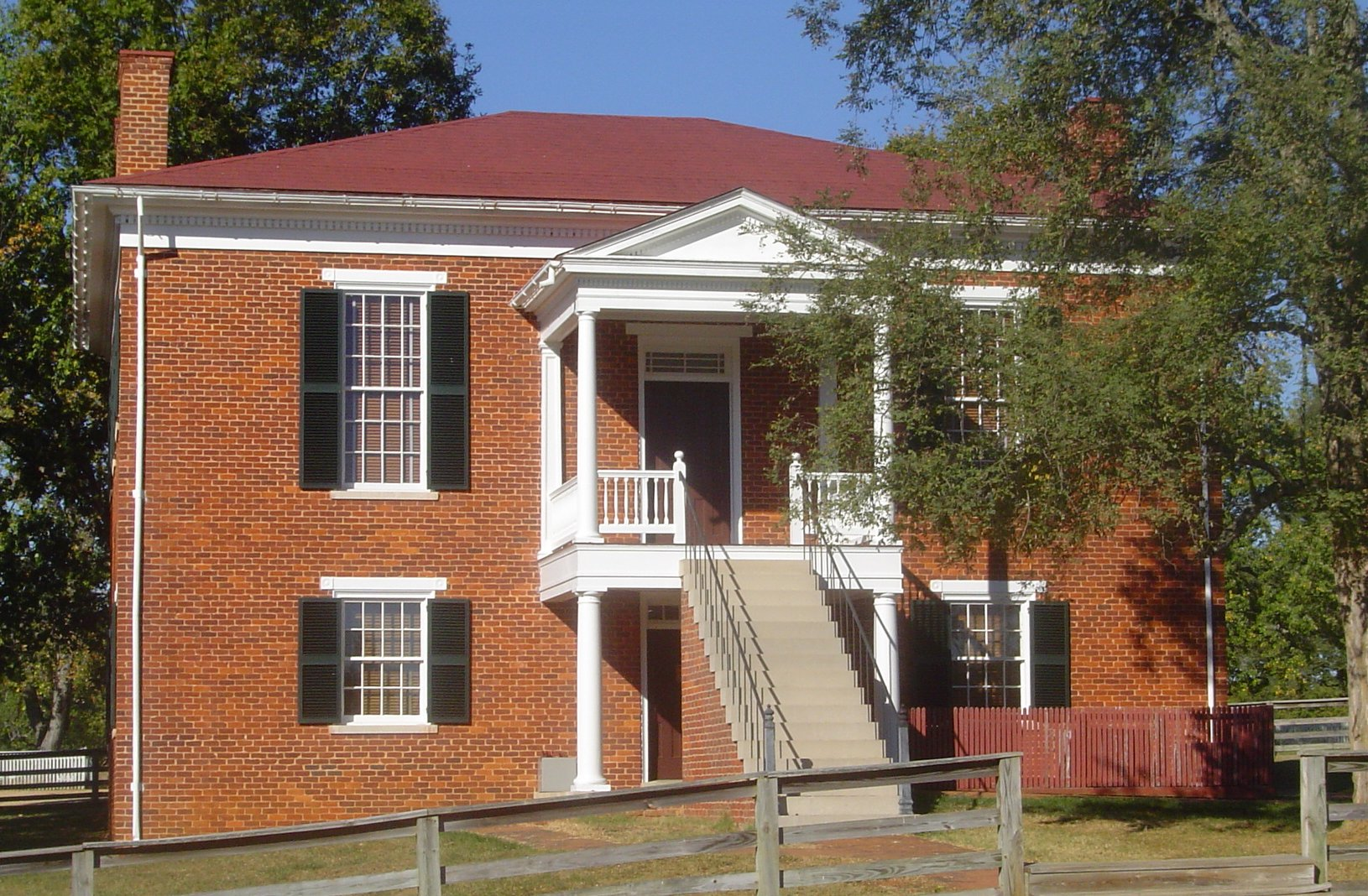
Old Appomattox Court House, 1846 (restored)

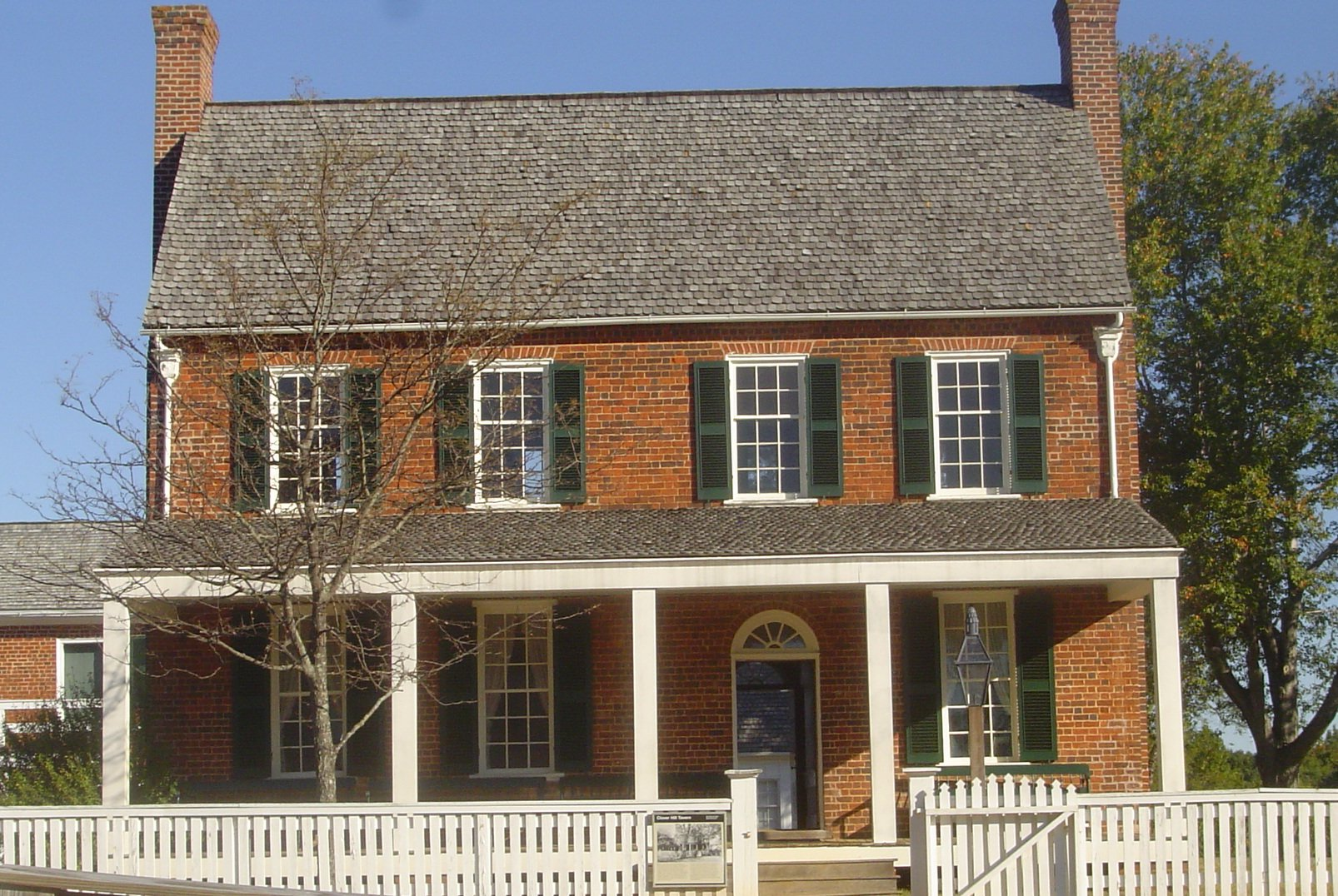
Clover Hill Tavern, 1819 (restored), Appomattox

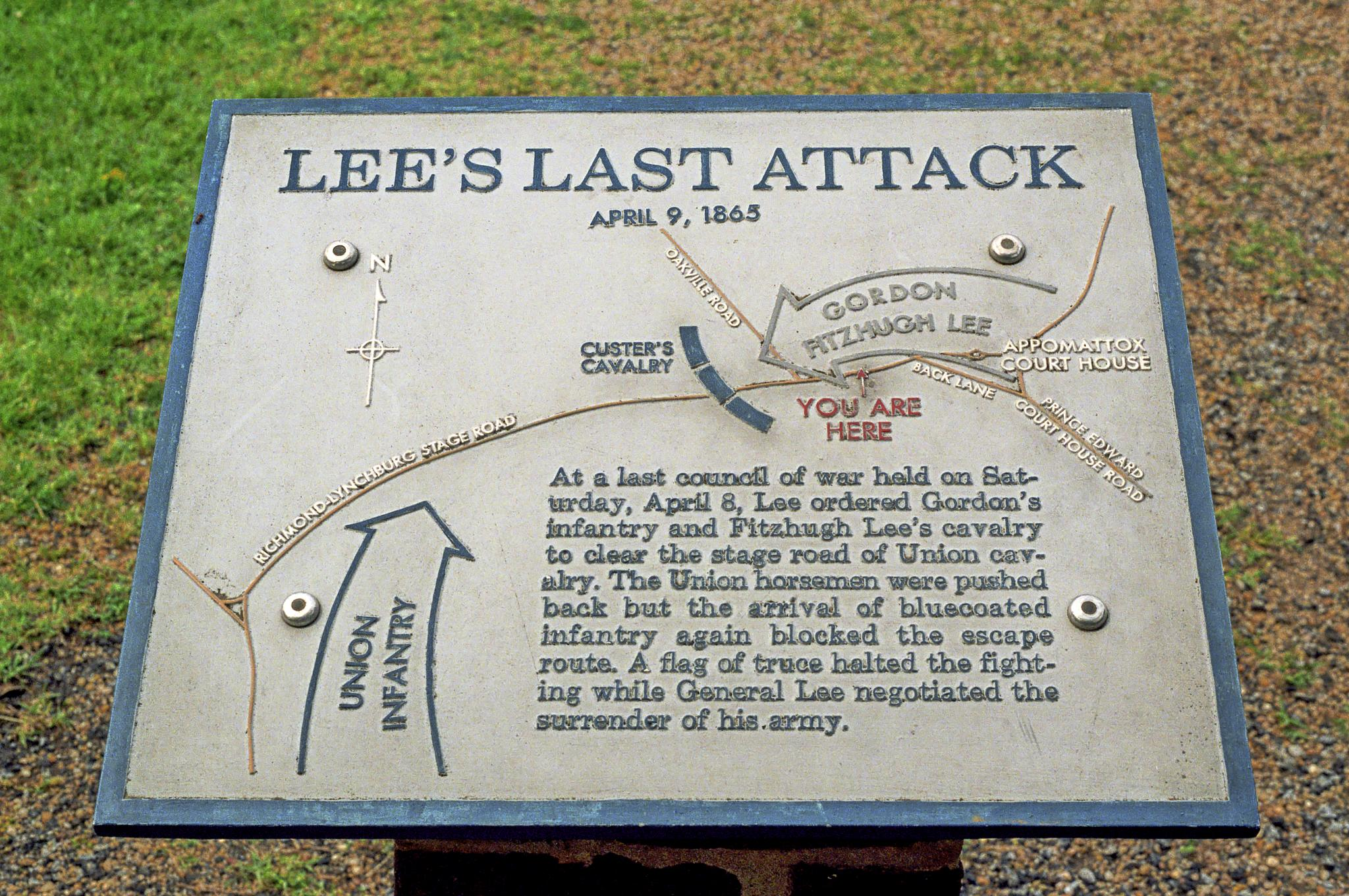
Historical marker of Lee's last attack April 9, 1865

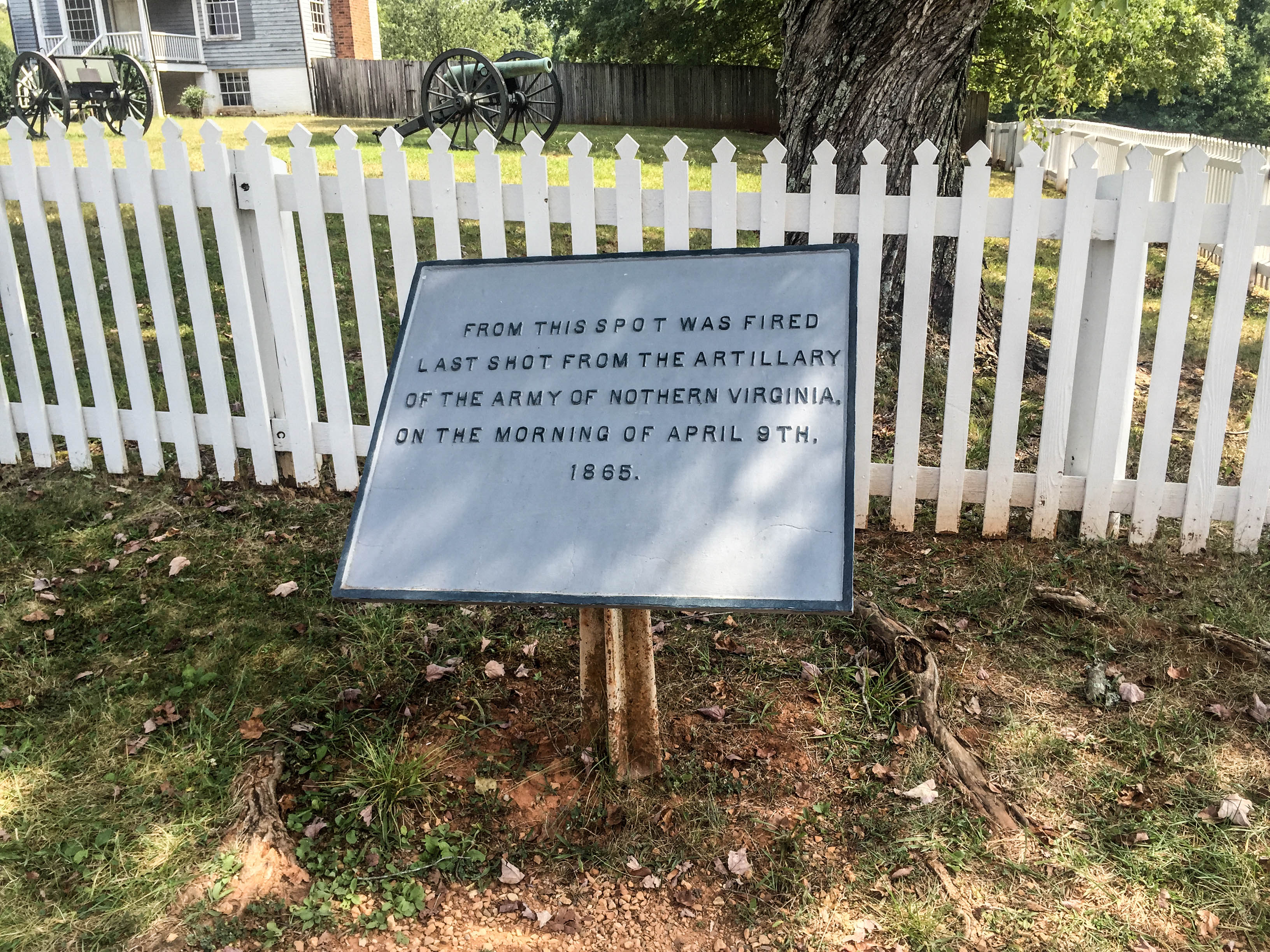
Place of last cannon fired by Confederate artillery

== See also ==
- Conclusion of the American Civil War
