= Isbell =

Isbell may refer to:

== People ==
- Alvertis Isbell (born 1940), American musician, songwriter, producer
- Arnold J. Isbell (1899–1945), American naval officer
- Cecil Isbell (1915–1985), American football player
- Clayton Isbell (born 2000), American football player
- Dolly Tree (1899-1962), British-American costume designer, nee Dorothy Marian "Dolly" Isbell
- Frank Isbell (1875–1941), American baseball player
- Harris Isbell (1910-1994), American physician
- Jane Isbell (1927-1981), American actress
- Jason Isbell (born 1979), American musician
- Jeffrey Dean Isbell (Izzy Stradlin) (born 1962), American musician
- Joe Isbell (born 1940), American football player
- John R. Isbell (1930–2005) American mathematician
- Larry Isbell (1930–1978), American football player
- Lynne Isbell (born 1955), American anthropologist
- Marion William Isbell (1904-1988), American founder of Ramada Motels
- Ruwellyn Isbell (born 1993), South African rugby union player
- Virginia Isbell, American politician
- Charles Lee Isbell, Jr., American computer scientist

== Places ==
- Isbell, unincorporated town in Franklin County, Alabama, United States, est. 1818
- Isbell Field, an airport near Fort Payne, Alabama, United States
- Mount Isbell, a mountain of Geologists Range, Churchill Mountains, Antarctica

== Miscellaneous ==
- Bocock-Isbell House, a historic house in Appomattox Court House National Park, Appomattox County, Virginia
- Hurricane Isbell, a storm of the 1964 Atlantic hurricane season
- Isbell Middle School, a middle school in Santa Paula, California, United States
- USS Arnold J. Isbell (DD-869), an American naval destroyer

== See also ==
- Isabel (disambiguation)
