= Woodson Law Office =

- U.S. Historic district – Contributing property
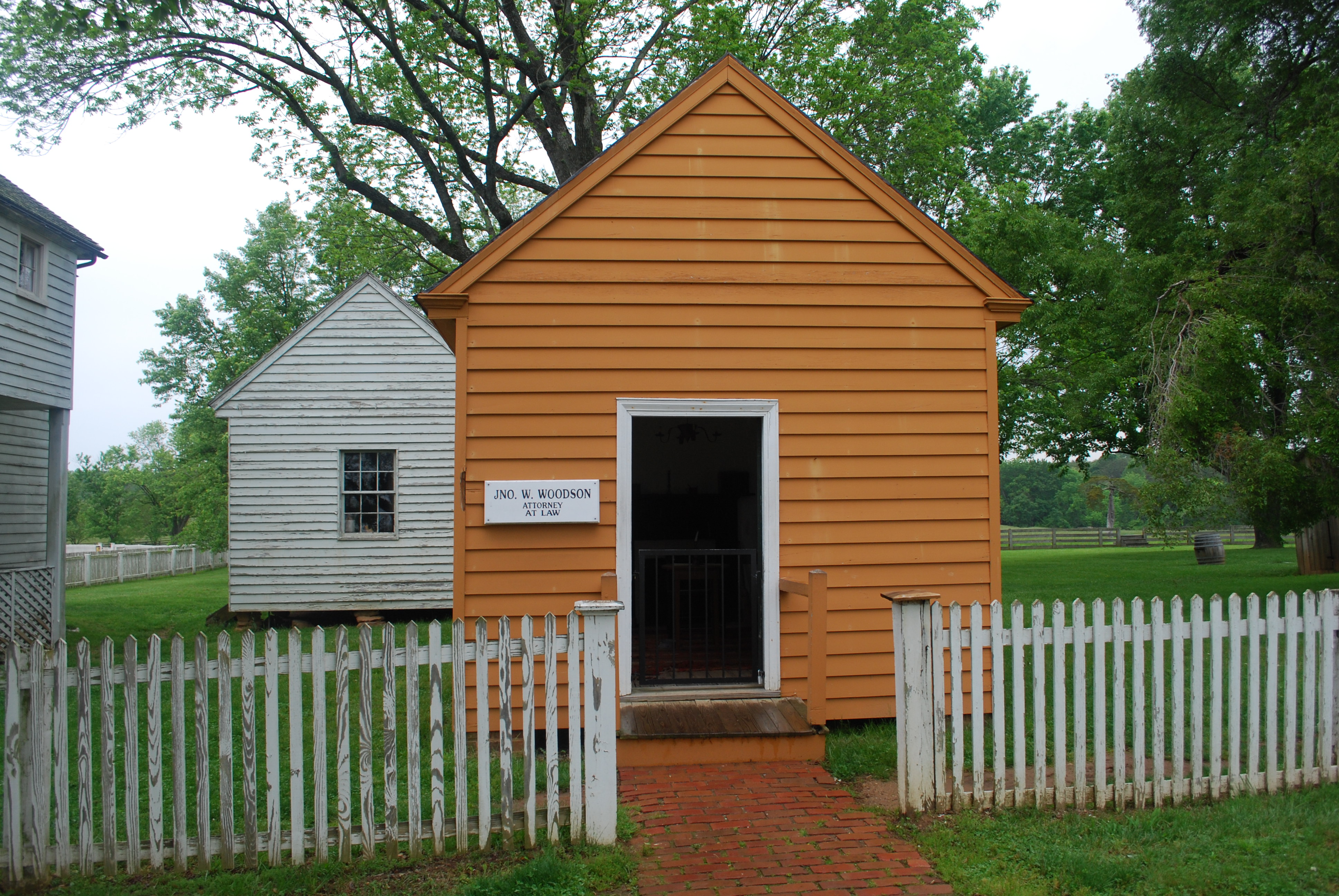
- Woodson Law Office
- Location: Appomattox County, Virginia
- Nearest city: Appomattox, Virginia
- Built: 1850s
- Visitation: 185,443 (2009)
- Part of: Appomattox Court House National Historical Park (ID66000827)
- Added to NRHP: October 15, 1966

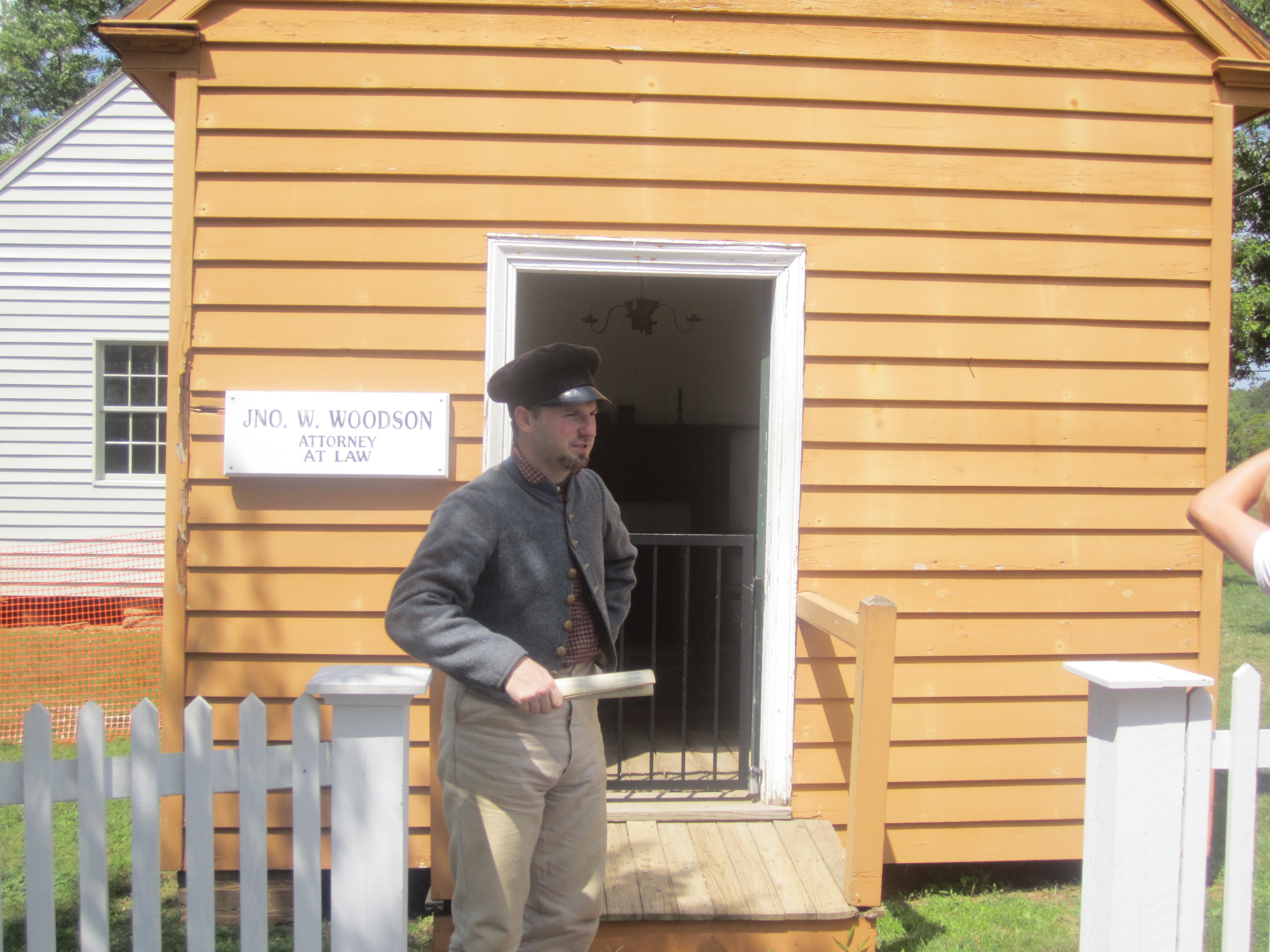
Guide in period costume at the law office at Appomattox

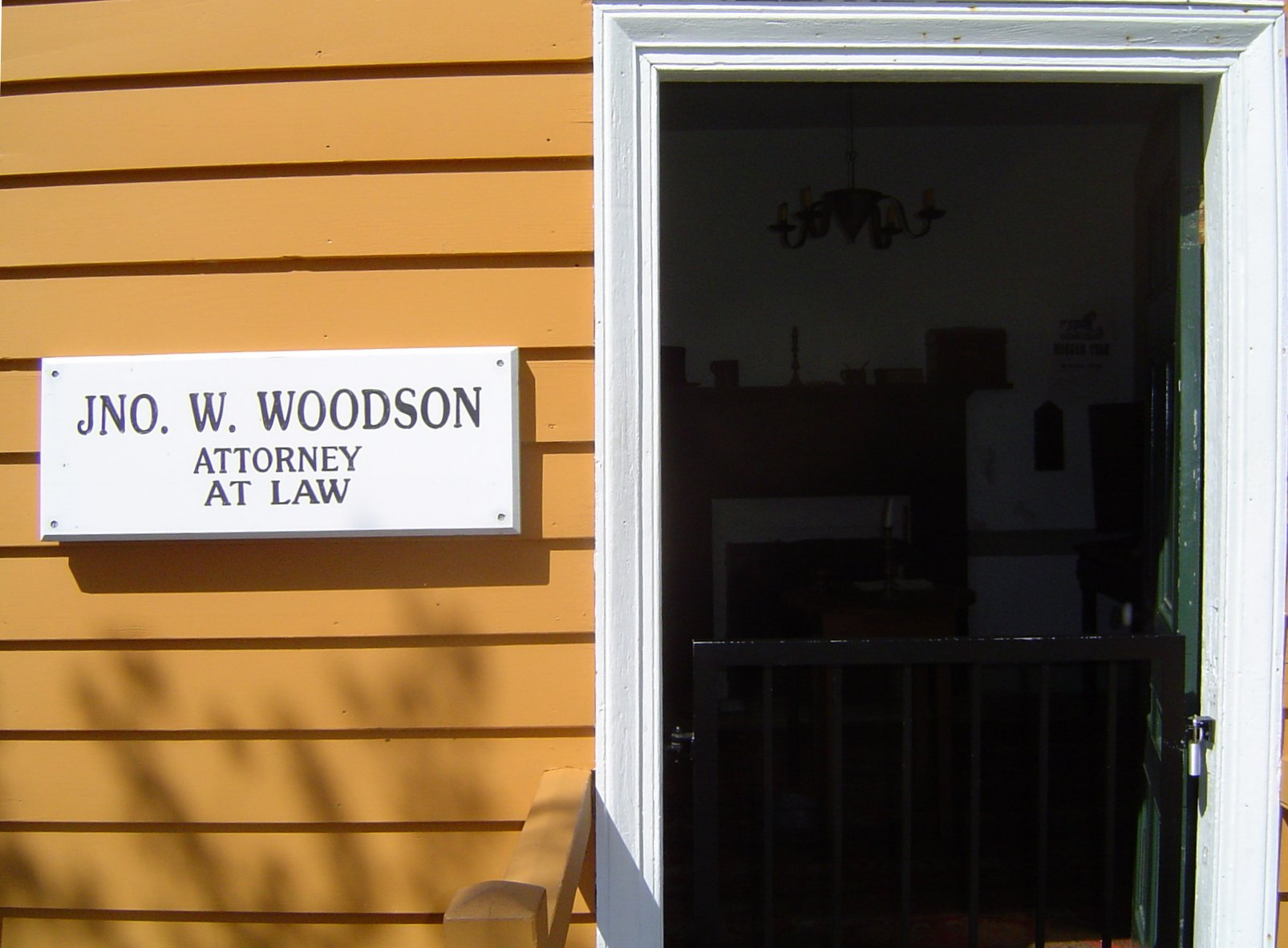
Woodson law office business sign

The Woodson Law Office is a structure within the Appomattox Court House National Historical Park. It was originally built by Samuel McDearmon in 1854 and rented by Woodson for his law office until he purchased it a couple of years later. It is a small structure and was built next to the main general store of Appomattox (then called Clover Hill).

The one room structure is historically significant to the Appomattox Court House National Historical Park and was registered in the National Park Service's database of Official Structures on June 26, 1989.

== History ==
The law office building was built between 1851 and 1856. It was purchased by lawyer John W. Woodson in 1856. It was a working law office during the time of the surrender of Confederate General Lee to the Union commander General Grant on April 9, 1865. Its furnishing are consistent with law offices of the time period, including an attorney's desk and a portrait of George Washington. John W. Woodson was no longer living at the time when General Lee surrendered to General Grant.

Woodson was born March 8, 1824, and died July 1, 1864. There is no confirmed evidence that it was necessarily always occupied by Woodson. He was an attorney that practiced law in the Old Appomattox Court House. Woodson rented the building from Samuel D. McDearmon starting on January 1, 1854. He used the building to store his law books, legal documents, and a change of clothing. In his book A Place Called Appomattox, historian William Marvel notes that "it was not until the first court day of 1854 that Woodson bought a hasp, hinge, and padlock for the building and a lock for the chest in which he could store a change of clothes."

In 1856 Woodson purchased the beige frame building from McDearmon, who was bankrupt by then. Woodson's village office was on the same corner lot as John Sear's blacksmith shop and had a small footprint. Woodson decided to sell the balance of the lot not used by himself to a John Plunkett, who owned the adjacent village general store known as the Plunkett-Meeks Store. The historian Marvel indicates that when John Woodson died of typhoid in 1864 "the little law office at Clover Hill" was left to his wife.

== Historical significance ==
The Appomattox Court House National Historical Park declares there are three of the National Register Criteria that make the structure historically significant.

- Criteria A - It has meaningful value because of its association with the site of the surrender of the Confederacy's supreme military commander and its principal army, which represented the conclusion of the American Civil War.
- Criteria B - It has meaningful value because of its association with the site of the surrender of Gen. Robert E. Lee and his subordinate commanders to Lt. Gen. Ulysses S. Grant, future President of the United States.
- Criteria C - It preserves the distinctive characteristics of embodying the period and method of construction typical in Piedmont Virginia in the mid-nineteenth century. It is considered typical of a county government seat and of a typical farming community in mid-nineteenth century Virginia.

== Description ==
The Woodson Law Office is a single story frame structure that is twelve and a half feet wide by fourteen and a half feet deep. Its construction started as early as 1851 and is post and beam on brick piers with a standing seam gable roof. It is sheathed in weatherboard with six inch exposure. There is an 8-panel door on the east gable front side. The west side has an external common bond brick chimney with a single step and a five course corbelled drip. The south and north sides have 6/6 double-hung sash with ten-inch and twelve-inch lights. It has single full-width shutters with exterior faces of beaded boards laid diagonally.

It was moved from its original location to be connected to north side of the Plunkett-Meeks store before 1874. It presently shows the relationship as it was to the Plunkett-Meeks Store and village scene at the time of surrender of General Lee to General Grant. The National Park Service restored the building in 1959 and in 1985.

== Interior ==
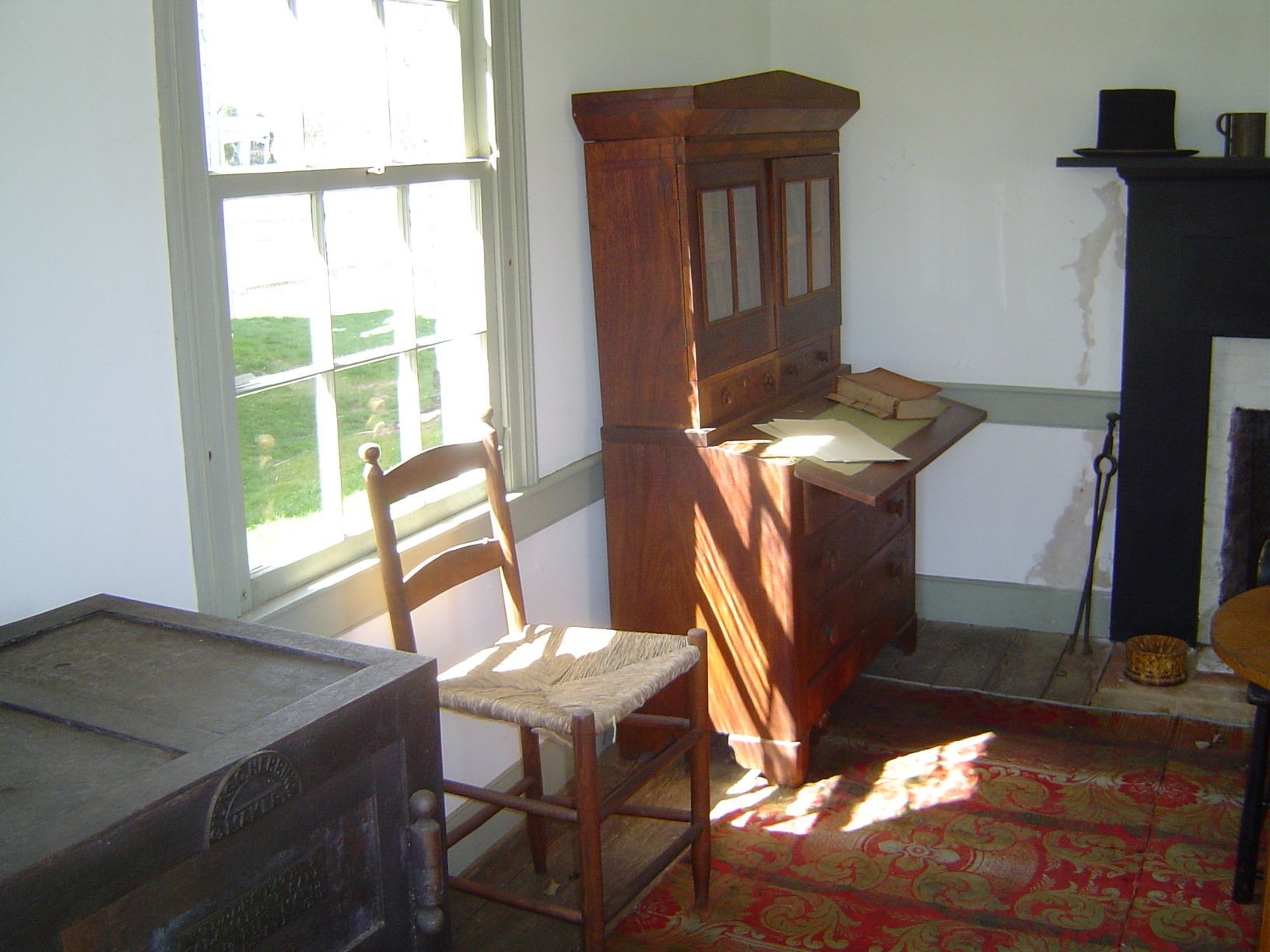
Cabinet for law books

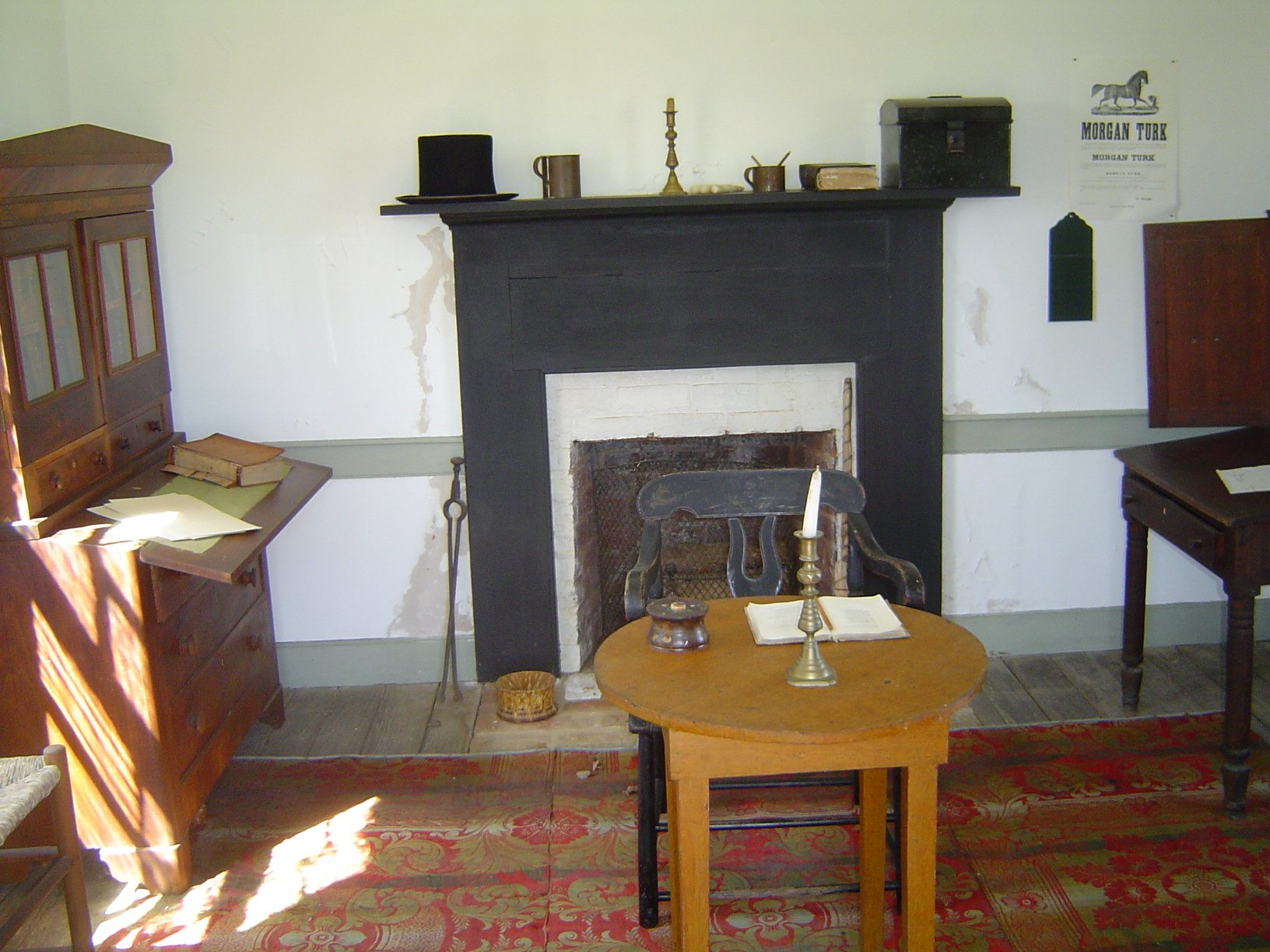
Fireplace heating

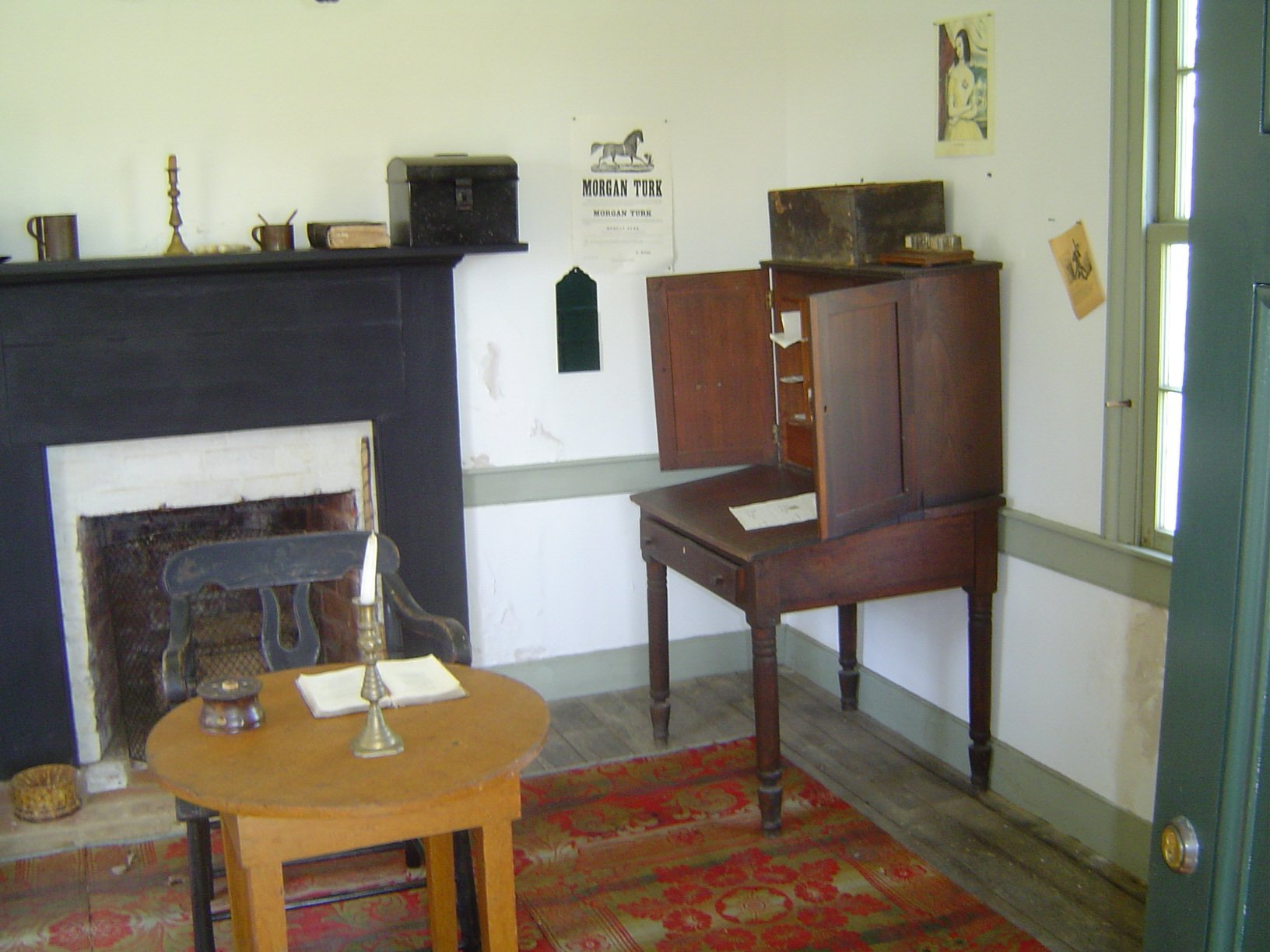
Secretary desk
