= McDearmon =

McDearmon is a surname. Notable people with the surname include:

- James C. McDearmon (1844–1902), American politician
- Samuel D. McDearmon (1815–1871), American politician and Confederate Army officer
