= New County Jail =

Historic building in Virginia, US

Coordinates: 37.377320°N 78.795467°W

- U.S. Historic district – Contributing property
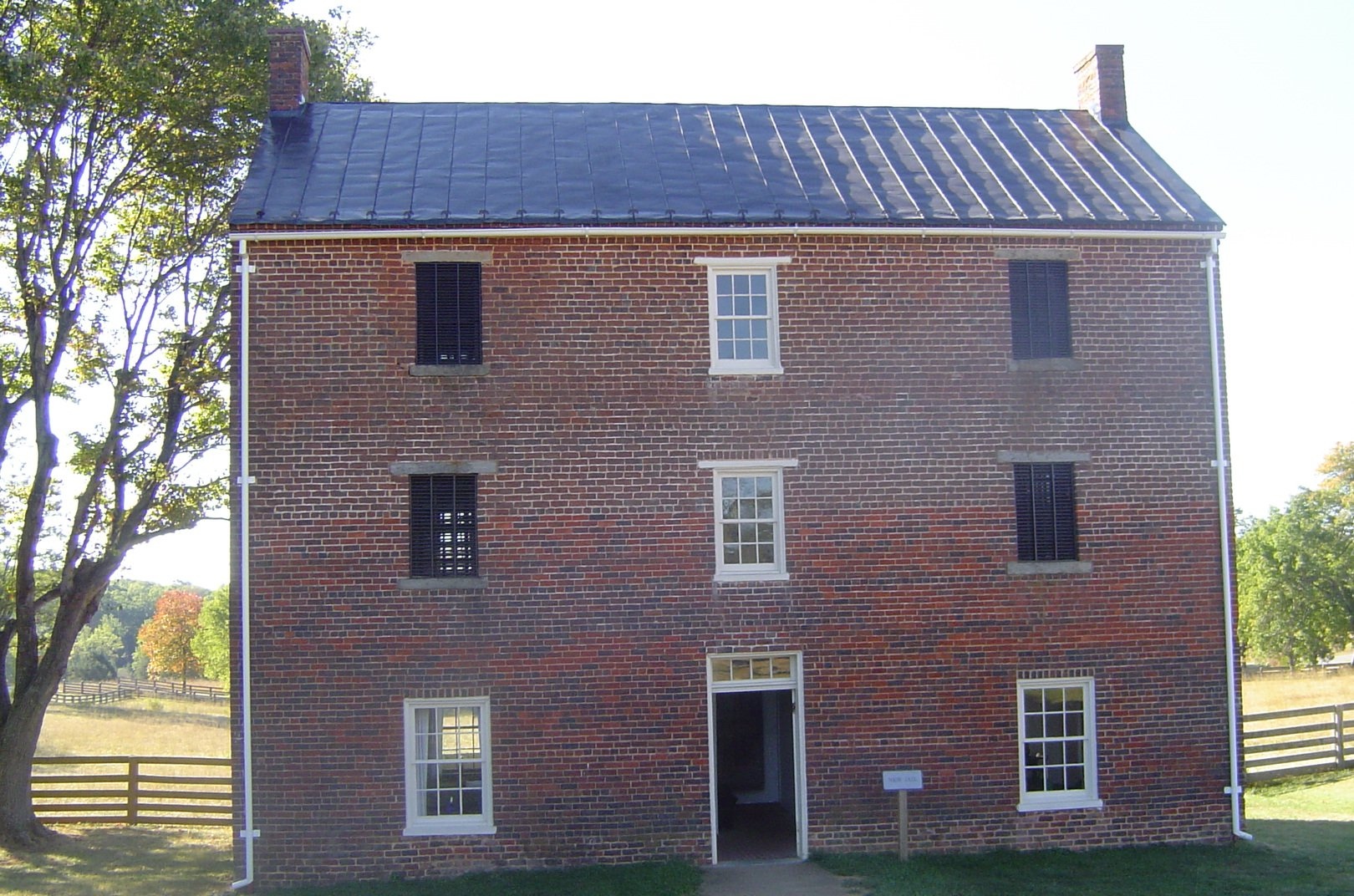
- The "new" county jail at Clover Hill

- Location within Virginia Location within the United States
- Location: Appomattox County, Virginia
- Nearest city: Appomattox, Virginia
- Built: 1860
- Visitation: 185,443 (2009)
- Part of: Appomattox Court House National Historical Park (ID66000827)
- Added to NRHP: October 15, 1966

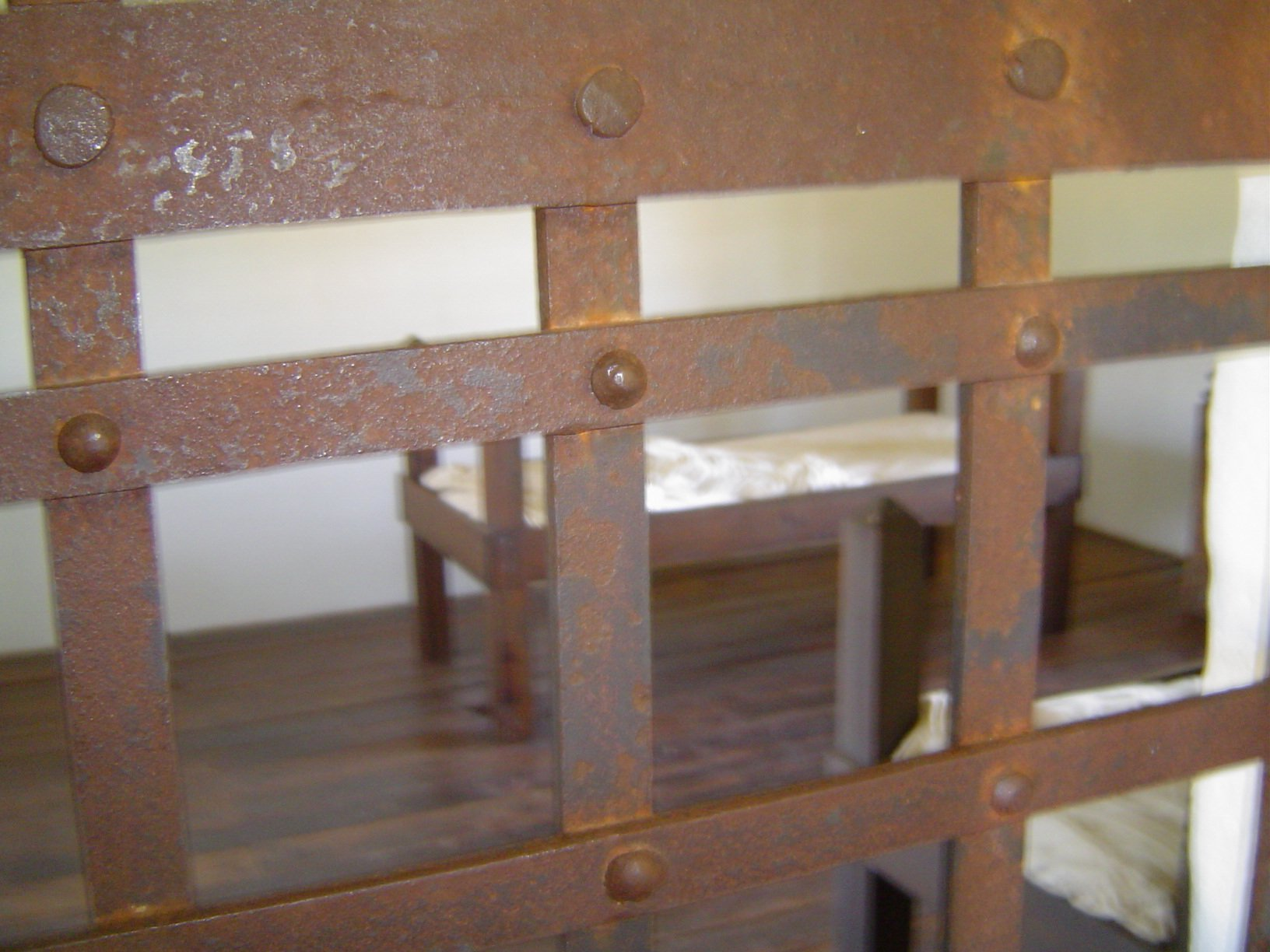
A prison cell inside the jail

The New County Jail is a structure within the Appomattox Court House National Historical Park. It was registered in the National Park Service's database of Official Structures on June 26, 1989.

== History ==
In the early sixteen hundreds, Captain John Smith explored the territory of Virginia under the sponsorship of the Virginia Company of London to colonize it for profits. In 1612, Smith made a map of what he had found. In his detailed map he showed the area including rivers and mountains. He also included settlements of the many tribes of Indians. Smith showed a tributary off the James River where there was an Indian Village that was called "Appamatuck". The tributary river joining the James River near this village was named after the Appamatuck Indians. There were many spelling variations for Appamatuck over the next two hundred years and it eventually developed for the English settlers into "Appomattox".

The need for localized service set about the formation of a new county by an act that was passed on February 8, 1845. It came from parts of Prince Edward, Buckingham, Charlotte and Campbell counties. The new "Appomattox County" seat was put at Clover Hill because it was centrally located along the Richmond-Lynchburg stagecoach road. Most of the new county came from Prince Edward County. There was already a stagecoach stop at Clover Hill, the new county seat hamlet which was high overlooking the Appomattox River. After officially made the courthouse seat and the name changed to "Appomattox Court House" in 1845 there was a surge of activity in real estate. Lots changed hands several times in land speculation in anticipation of new public buildings. The first building constructed was a county jail in 1845, a log structure. Then came a new courthouse across the stagecoach road west in 1846. During the American Civil War the original log jail burned down around 1867. It was replaced in 1870 with the present three story brick jail, the New County Jail, which was already started in construction in 1860.

== Historical significance ==
The New County Jail represents the participation of the federal government in the preservation and commemoration of historically significant events. It also has distinctive characteristics as an example of embodying a type, period, and method of construction in the 1870s in rural Virginia. It is noted both as a county government seat and of a farming community in Piedmont Virginia in the nineteenth century.

== Description ==
The New County Jail layout and exterior finish clearly depict its use as a jail. It is a three-story building of forty feet wide and twenty feet deep and across Main Street from the site of the old original wooden county jail. The construction of the building started in 1860, however it was not finished until 1867 due to the Civil War. The structure is made of brick and iron. It has at least two different brick types due to the long construction time. The prisoner jail cells with iron bars were on the top two floors. It also has an attic. The prisoner cells nor the second and third floors at all had any heat source. The first floor where the sheriff's office and quarters were have fireplaces.

It is constructed with interior partitions of brick with stone window sills and lintels at the cells. It is built with a standing seam gable roof. There is a wooden platform on brick piers at the rear door and the metal frame walls are mortared. The gable roof was replaced in 1978. The chimney tops were repaired in 1982. The exterior walls are of local brick with half-brick vent holes into the crawl space below the first floor level. The second and third floor has outer east and west windows. The cell windows have lintels and sills cut from local sandstone. The center hall and first floor windows have wood sills and lintels. The first floor and center windows of the second and third floor north sides have 6/6 double hanging windows. The center north side entrance is a four-raised panel door surrounded by a four-light transom. The gable ends are void of any window openings as is the south facade.

The building served as a jail from 1870 to 1892. The district of Clover Hill used it as their magisterial district polling station from 1892 to 1940. Within the Park the National Park Service List of Classified Structures identification number is 000036, with the structure number being 08. The New County Jail, a brick jail built from 1860 to 1870, was restored in 1963 to 1965 by the National Park Service. It was permanently preserved in 2000.

== Sources ==
- Bradford, Ned, Battles and Leaders of the Civil War, Plume, 1989
- Catton, Bruce, A Stillness at Appomattox, Doubleday 1953, Library of Congress # 53–9982, ISBN 0-385-04451-8
- Catton, Bruce, This Hallowed Ground, Doubleday 1953, Library of Congress # 56-5960
- Chaffin, Tom, 2006. Sea of Gray: The Around-the-World Odyssey of the Confederate Raider Shenandoah, Hill and Wang/Farrar, Straus and Giroux,.
- Davis, Burke, The Civil War: Strange & Fascinating Facts, Wings Books, 1960 & 1982, ISBN 0-517-37151-0
- Davis, Burke, To Appomattox - Nine April Days, 1865, Eastern Acorn Press, 1992, ISBN 0-915992-17-5
- Gutek, Patricia, Plantations and Outdoor Museums in America's Historic South, University of South Carolina Press, 1996, ISBN 1-57003-071-5
- Hosmer, Charles Bridgham, Preservation Comes of Age: From Williamsburg to the National Trust, 1926-1949, Preservation Press, National Trust for Historic Preservation in the United States by the University Press of Virginia, 1981
- Kaiser, Harvey H., The National Park Architecture Sourcebook, Princeton Architectural Press, 2008, ISBN 1-56898-742-0
- Kennedy, Frances H., The Civil War Battlefield Guide, Houghton Mifflin Company, 1990, ISBN 0-395-52282-X
- Korn, Jerry et al., The Civil War, Pursuit to Appomattox, The Last Battles, Time-Life Books, 1987, ISBN 0-8094-4788-6
- Marvel, William, A Place Called Appomattox, UNC Press, 2000, ISBN 0-8078-2568-9
- Marvel, William, Lee's Last Retreat, UNC Press, 2006, ISBN 0-8078-5703-3
- McPherson, James M., Battle Cry of Freedom, Oxford University Press, 1988,
- National Park Service, Appomattox Court House: Appomattox Court House National Historical Park, Virginia, U.S. Dept. of the Interior, 2002, ISBN 0-912627-70-0
- Tidwell, William A., April '65: Confederate Covert Action in the American Civil War, Kent State University Press, 1995, ISBN 0-87338-515-2
- Weigley, Russel F., A Great Civil War: A Military and Political History, 1861-1865, Indiana University Press, 2000, ISBN 0-253-33738-0
