= Peers House =

- U.S. Historic district – Contributing property
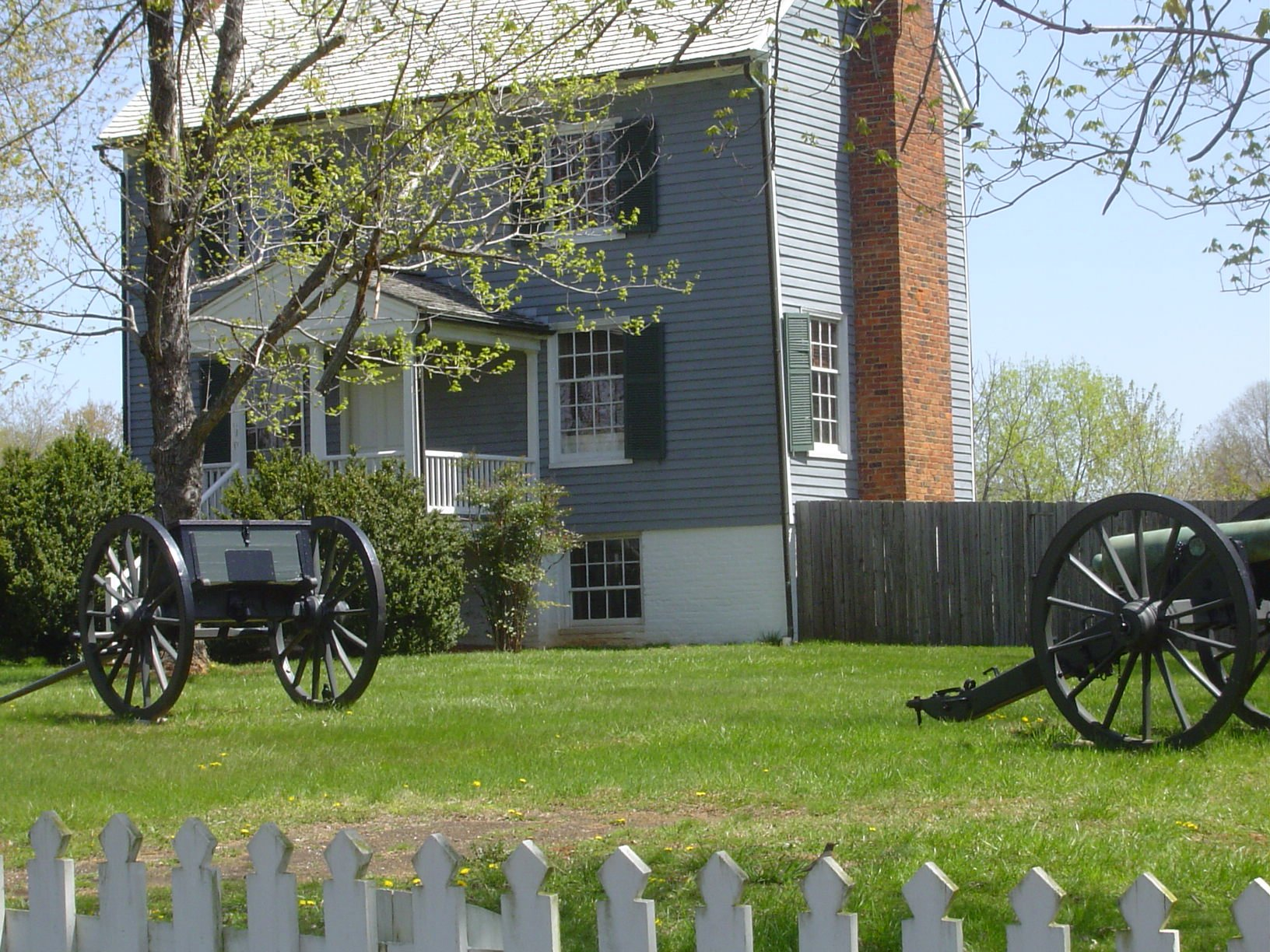
- Peers House

- Location within Virginia Location within the United States
- Location: Appomattox County, Virginia
- Nearest city: Appomattox, Virginia
- Coordinates: 37°22′43″N 78°47′47″W
- Built: 1855
- Visitation: 185,443 (2009)
- Part of: Appomattox Court House National Historical Park (ID66000827)
- Added to NRHP: October 15, 1966

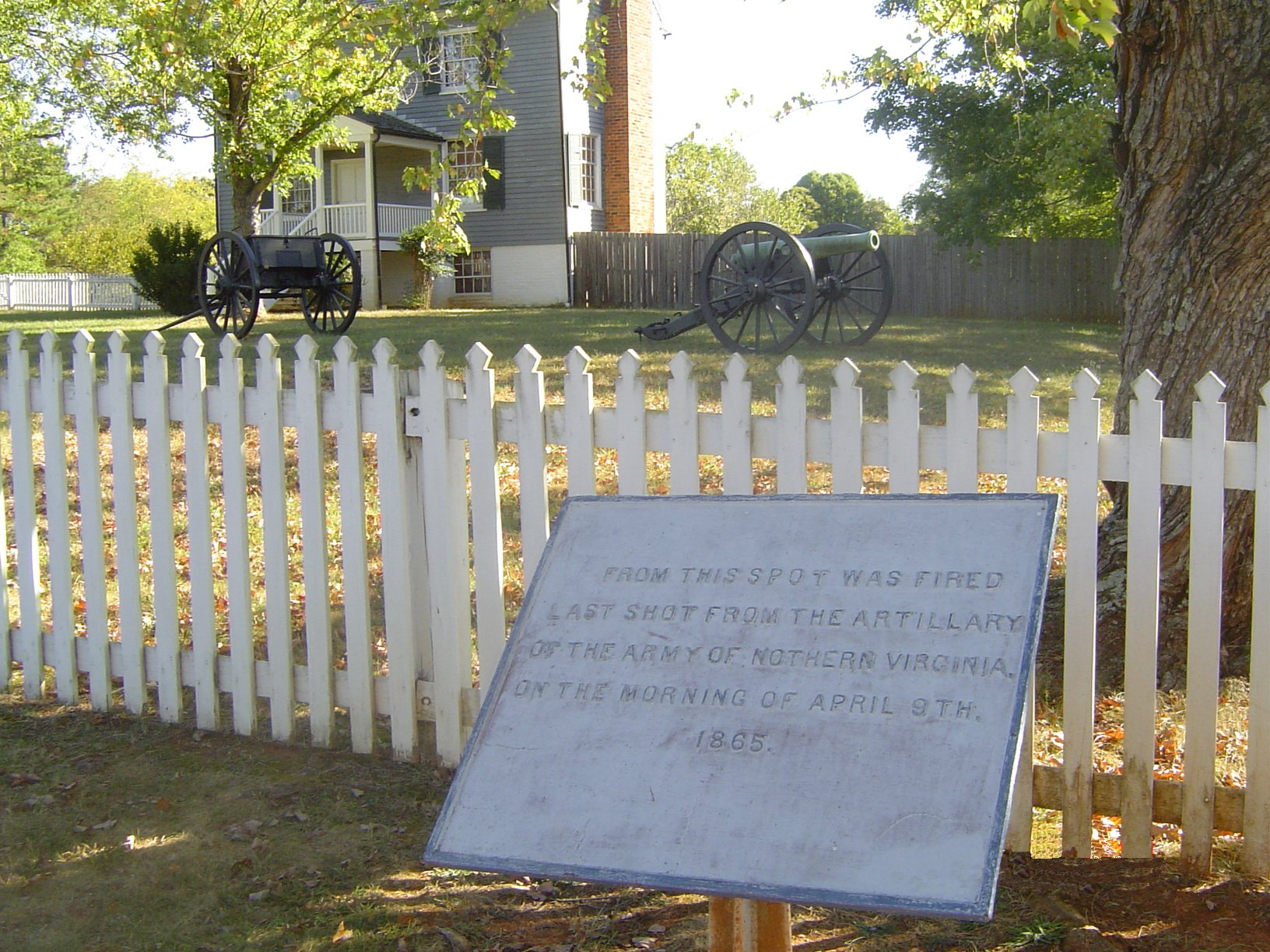
Marker at Peers House

The Peers House is a structure within the Appomattox Court House National Historical Park. It was registered in the National Park Service's database of Official Structures on June 26, 1989.

== History ==
The Peers House was constructed in 1855. Samuel D. McDearmon originally sold the house to William Abbitt, who then in turn sold the house to D. A. Plunkett in 1856. When General Lee surrendered to General Grant the house on a hilltop overlooking the village of Appomattox Court House, once owned by Sheriff Plunkett, was owned and occupied by a George Peers. Peers was able to obtain the house at public auction for non-payment of loans in 1870 after Plunkett's death.

=== George T. Peers ===
George T. Peers was a well known Appomattox County clerk for some forty years. Historian Nathaniel Ragland Featherston writes in his book Appomattox County History and Genealogy that between the close of the Civil War and the time the original "court house" burned down (1892) there was a group of a dozen or so town's people in the village of Appomattox Court House that socially were like one big happy family. Among these key village people was Peers.

Historian William Marvel writes in his book A Place Called Appomattox that Peers was the longest standing court clerk. He says Peers remembers the "court house" as standing forty feet square as he drew a map of the village of Appomattox Court House ("Clover Hill").

== Historical significance ==
The National Park Service states that the Peers House has importance by virtue of its association with the site of General Robert E. Lee's surrender to General Ulysses S. Grant. The Confederate soldiers marched past the house on the Richmond-Lynchburg Stage Road to go into battle on April 9, 1865. This is where they stacked their arms on April 12, 1865. One of the last artillery shots fired by the Confederate Northern Virginia killed Lieutenant Hiram Clark of the 185th New York Infantry near the Peers house on the morning of April 9, 1865.

The Peers House embodies the distinctive characteristics of a type, period, and method of construction of mid-nineteenth century rural Virginia. The building with its resources is considered typical of both a county government seat and of a farming community in Piedmont Virginia in the mid-nineteenth century.

== Description ==
The Peers House has many of the same characteristics as the Bocock-Isbell House, which is nearby. The two story house is thirty four feet wide by eighteen feet deep and is of post and beam construction. It is built on a brick raised basement almost 6 feet above grade. The house is finished with a narrow wood siding with an almost five inch exposure. The house comes with an attic.

The Peers House has single step external end chimneys and with its narrow wood siding. The west side has a temple form entry porch raised to the first floor. There are simple box posts that support the pedimented gable over the porch. The porch gable and main roof are covered with square-butt wood shingles and covers a four-paneled entry door. The windows are a combination of 8/8, 8/12 (first floor west side), 6/9 and 6/6 sash windows. The east side has a porch with a shed roof on the first floor. The house was completely renovated in 1954 and is currently used as staff housing.

== Sources ==
- Bradford, Ned, Battles and Leaders of the Civil War, Plume, 1989
- Catton, Bruce, A Stillness at Appomattox, Doubleday 1953, Library of Congress # 53-9982, ISBN 0-385-04451-8
- Catton, Bruce, This Hallowed Ground, Doubleday 1953, Library of Congress # 56-5960
- Davis, Burke, The Civil War: Strange & Fascinating Facts, Wings Books, 1960 & 1982, ISBN 0-517-37151-0
- Davis, Burke, To Appomattox - Nine April Days, 1865, Eastern Acorn Press, 1992, ISBN 0-915992-17-5
- Featherston, Nathaniel Ragland, Appomattox County History and Genealogy, Genealogical Publishing Company, 1998, ISBN 0-8063-4760-0
- Gutek, Patricia, Plantations and Outdoor Museums in America's Historic South, University of South Carolina Press, 1996, ISBN 1-57003-071-5
- Hosmer, Charles Bridgham, Preservation Comes of Age: From Williamsburg to the National Trust, 1926-1949, Preservation Press, National Trust for Historic Preservation in the United States by the University Press of Virginia, 1981
- Howard, Blair et al., The Virginia Handbook, Hunter Publishing, Inc, 2005, ISBN 1-58843-512-1
- Kaiser, Harvey H., The National Park Architecture Sourcebook, Princeton Architectural Press, 2008, ISBN 1-56898-742-0
- Kennedy, Frances H., The Civil War Battlefield Guide, Houghton Mifflin Company, 1990, ISBN 0-395-52282-X
- Korn, Jerry et al., The Civil War, Pursuit to Appomattox, The Last Battles, Time-Life Books, 1987, ISBN 0-8094-4788-6
- Marvel, William, A Place Called Appomattox, UNC Press, 2000, ISBN 0-8078-2568-9
- Marvel, William, Lee's Last Retreat, UNC Press, 2006, ISBN 0-8078-5703-3
- McPherson, James M., Battle Cry of Freedom, Oxford University Press, 1988,
- National Park Service, Appomattox Court House: Appomattox Court House National Historical Park, Virginia, U.S. Dept. of the Interior, 2002, ISBN 0-912627-70-0
- Tidwell, William A., April '65: Confederate Covert Action in the American Civil War, Kent State University Press, 1995, ISBN 0-87338-515-2
- Tyler, Lyon Gardiner, Tyler's Quarterly Historical and Genealogical Magazine, 1952
- Weigley, Russel F., A Great Civil War: A Military and Political History, 1861-1865, Indiana University Press, 2000, ISBN 0-253-33738-0
