= Bocock–Isbell House =

Historic house in Virginia, United States

- U.S. Historic district – Contributing property
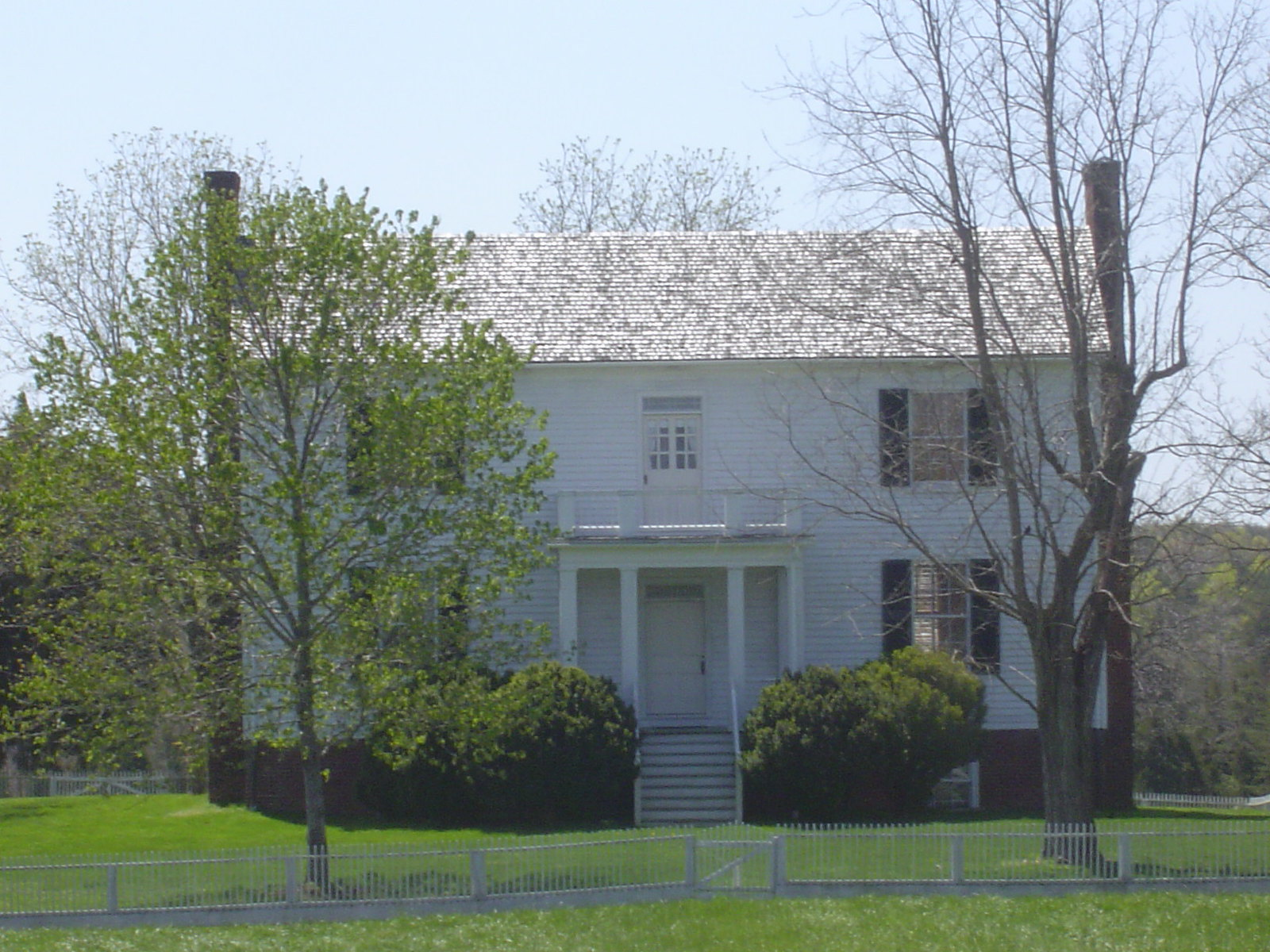
- Bocock–Isbell House

- Location within Virginia Location within the United States
- Location: Appomattox County, Virginia
- Nearest city: Appomattox, Virginia
- Coordinates: 37°22′43″N 78°47′47″W
- Area: 1,800 acres (728 ha)
- Built: 1850
- Architect: National Park Service
- Visitation: 185,443 (2009)
- Part of: Appomattox Court House National Historical Park (ID66000827)
- Added to NRHP: October 15, 1966

The Bocock–Isbell House is a structure within the Appomattox Court House National Historical Park. It was registered in the National Park Service's database of Official Structures on June 26, 1989.

== History ==
The Bocock–Isbell House has major importance to the Appomattox Court House National Historical Park by virtue of its association with the history and the site of General Robert E. Lee's surrender to General Ulysses S. Grant of the American Civil War. It was constructed in 1849 to 1850 by Thomas S. Bocock and Henry F. Bocock, brothers. Thomas was a member of the United States Congress and Speaker of the Confederate House of Representatives. At the time, Henry was Clerk of the Court for Appomattox County. Lewis Daniel Isbell (1818-1889) was Appomattox County Commonwealth Attorney during the American Civil War (Judge later) and occupied the house at the time General Robert E. Lee surrendered to General Ulysses S. Grant in 1865. He was Appomattox County's representative to the Secession Convention of 1861 and voted to secede from the Union.

== Historical significance ==
The Bocock–Isbell House has importance because of its distinctive characteristics of a type, period, and method of construction during the nineteenth century in rural Virginia. The building with its resources associated with the Bocock–Isbell House are typical of both a county government seat ("court house") in Piedmont Virginia in the mid-nineteenth century and of a farming community in Virginia.

== Description ==
The Bocock–Isbell House is much like the Peers House. The post and beam house is a three bay two-story structure. The Bocock–Isbell House is nineteen feet wide by fifty feet deep with a raised basement of brick laid in common bond. The gable roof is covered with wood shingles. The house frame is sheathed by weatherboards. The southeast closet extension has a shed roof, is two and a half feet by six and a half feet.

The north (entrance) porch has a flat roof of nearly fifteen feet by ten and a half feet. The south porch has a tin shed roof twenty feet by ten and a half feet. Both porches are on brick piers. The exterior of the house is restored and the interior is reconstructed. The first-floor, second-floor and basement windows are 6/6 DH. The first and second floor windows have shutters. The north facade entry door is a wood door with four raised panels, with a fifteen-light transom above.

The Bocock–Isbell House was restored in 1948 to 1949 and preserved in 1992 to 1993. Work was done on it again to stabilize it in 1995 and again it was preserved in 1999.

== Sources ==
- Bradford, Ned, Battles and Leaders of the Civil War, Plume, 1989
- Carroll, Orville W., Historic Structures Report Part III, Architectural Data Section on Mariah Wright House, Appomattox Court House National Historical Park. Ms. on file, National park Service, Chesapeake and Allegheny Systems Support Office, Philadelphia, Pennsylvania, 1965
- Catton, Bruce, A Stillness at Appomattox, Doubleday 1953, Library of Congress # 53-9982, ISBN 0-385-04451-8
- Catton, Bruce, This Hallowed Ground, Doubleday 1953, Library of Congress # 56-5960
- Davis, Burke, The Civil War: Strange & Fascinating Facts, Wings Books, 1960 & 1982, ISBN 0-517-37151-0
- Davis, Burke, To Appomattox – Nine April Days, 1865, Eastern Acorn Press, 1992, ISBN 0-915992-17-5
- Farrar, Stuart McDearmon, Historical Notes of Appomattox County, Virginia, self-published by Farrar, 1989, Original from the University of Virginia
- Featherston, Nathaniel Ragland, Appomattox County History and Genealogy, Genealogical Publishing Company, 1998, ISBN 0-8063-4760-0
- Featherston, Nathaniel Ragland, History of Appomattox, Walsworth Bros., Printers, Marceline, Missouri, 1948
- Fiero, Kathleen, Archeological Research Mariah Wright House Outbuildings, Historic Roads. National Park Service, Denver Service Center. Denver, Colorado, 1983
- Glassie, Henry H., Vernacular Architecture, Indiana University Press, 2000, ISBN 0-253-21395-9
- Gutek, Patricia, Plantations and Outdoor Museums in America's Historic South, University of South Carolina Press, 1996, ISBN 1-57003-071-5
- Hosmer, Charles Bridgham, Preservation Comes of Age: From Williamsburg to the National Trust, 1926-1949, Preservation Press, National Trust for Historic Preservation in the United States by the University Press of Virginia, 1981
- Howard, Blair et al., The Virginia Handbook, Hunter Publishing, Inc, 2005, ISBN 1-58843-512-1
- Kaiser, Harvey H., The National Park Architecture Sourcebook, Princeton Architectural Press, 2008, ISBN 1-56898-742-0
- Kennedy, Frances H., The Civil War Battlefield Guide, Houghton Mifflin Company, 1990, ISBN 0-395-52282-X
- Korn, Jerry et al., The Civil War, Pursuit to Appomattox, The Last Battles, Time-Life Books, 1987, ISBN 0-8094-4788-6
- Marvel, William, A Place Called Appomattox, UNC Press, 2000, ISBN 0-8078-2568-9
- Marvel, William, Lee's Last Retreat, UNC Press, 2006, ISBN 0-8078-5703-3
- McPherson, James M., Battle Cry of Freedom, Oxford University Press, 1988,
- National Park Service, Appomattox Court House: Appomattox Court House National Historical Park, Virginia, U.S. Dept. of the Interior, 2002, ISBN 0-912627-70-0
- Schlegel, Marvin W. and Carroll, Orville W., Historic Structures Report Part I, Administrative, Historical, and Architectural Data Mariah Wright House, Appomattox Court House National Historical Park, National Park Service, Chesapeake and Allegheny Systems Support Office, Philadelphia, Pennsylvania, 1959
- Tidwell, William A., April '65: Confederate Covert Action in the American Civil War, Kent State University Press, 1995, ISBN 0-87338-515-2
- Tyler, Lyon Gardiner, Tyler's Quarterly Historical and Genealogical Magazine, 1952
- Weigley, Russel F., A Great Civil War: A Military and Political History, 1861-1865, Indiana University Press, 2000, ISBN 0-253-33738-0
