= Appomattox Court House National Historical Park ruins =

Coordinates: 37°22′43″N 78°47′47″W

- U.S. Historic district – Contributing property
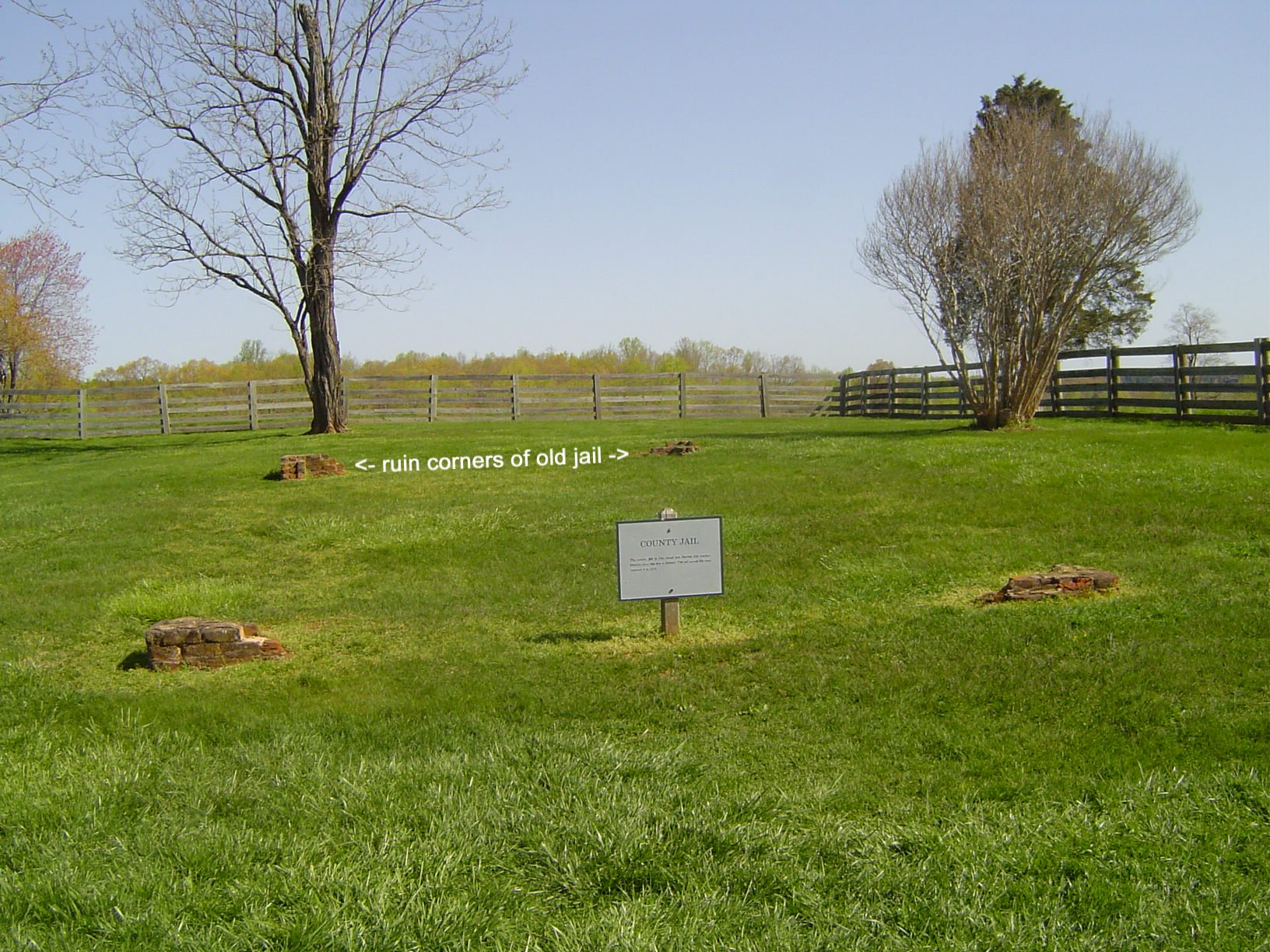
- Site of "old" county jail, now ruins

- Location within Virginia Location within the United States
- Nearest city: Appomattox, Virginia
- Built: 1865
- Part of: Appomattox Court House National Historical Park (ID66000827)
- Designated CP: October 15, 1966

The Appomattox Court House National Historical Park ruins are part of the Appomattox Court House National Historical Park, Virginia which was listed on the National Register of Historic Places on October 15, 1966.

== McDearmon–Tibbs–Scott house ruin ==
Samuel D. McDearmon purchased the undeveloped 206-acre (0.83 km^{2}) "Clover Hill" tract from Hugh Raine in 1846, cutting off 30 acres (12 ha) for a county seat for the new Appomattox county. In 1849 he began improving the now 176-acre (0.71 km^{2}) property adding $1,056 (~$31,400 in 2024) worth of buildings. By 1851 he had made improvements totaling $2,800, (~$83,653 in 2024) likely indicating that the mansion house had been completed. This chronology also corresponds to his known political and financial zenith. Although he offered the tract for sale in October 1854, Jacob Tibbs did not purchase McDearmon's property until 1856 and then only 140 acres (57 ha) of it, which included the $2800 "improvements." The following year Tibbs's "improvements" had been reduced to $2000.
