= Samuel D. McDearmon =

American politician

Samuel Daniel McDearmon
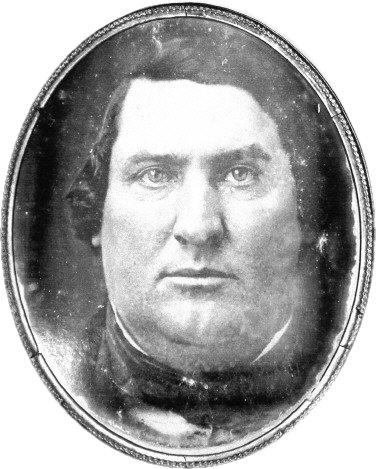
- Colonel McDearmon
- Born: 1815; Prince Edward County, Virginia
- Died: 1871 (aged 55–56); Nebraska Appomattox, Virginia
- Burial place: Liberty Cemetery
- Military career
- Allegiance: United States of America; Confederate States of America
- Branch: United States Army; Confederate States Army
- Service years: 1837–53; 1859–68
- Rank: Colonel

Samuel Daniel McDearmon (1815–1871), also known as Samuel D. McDearmon, was a Confederate army officer during the American Civil War. He held a number of political and government offices, and played a significant role in the development of Appomattox and Appomattox Court House, Virginia.

== Biography ==
McDearmon was born in Prince Edward County, Virginia, on November 18, 1815, and died in "Nebraska" (today Appomattox), Virginia, on May 16, 1871. He was the eldest son of the Reverend James McDearmon (1790–1867) and Mary (Daniel) McDearmon (1788–1866). His father was a merchant, miller and county magistrate as well as a Presbyterian (New School) minister, his father's income deriving mostly from the family farm. James McDearmon owned Mount Evergreen, an estate originating in the land bounty granted to his grandfather for French & Indian War service. By the 1850 Census the Rev. James McDearmon held 22 slaves and real estate valued at $7000. This property was about seven miles (11 km) southeast of Clover Hill (later known as Appomattox Court House village). In the 1830s Samuel D. McDearmon had received a share of this estate.

In 1835 at age nineteen McDearmon married Mary Frances Philadelphia Walton (1814–1884), the daughter of Col William Walton (1782–1851) of Buckingham County. She came with a substantial dowry, which would prove fortunate in later years. By 1845 McDearmon owned almost 450 acres (1.8 km^{2}), consisting of part of Mount Evergreen and adjoining lands. He also held in trust a neighbor's estate of some 147 acres (0.59 km^{2}). Near his father's Mount Evergreen property he owned and operated a sawmill ("Evergreen Mills"), which provided a regular income for him. After the formation of the new county of Appomattox in April 1845, he purchased most of the land in and around the Clover Hill Tavern, and in 1846 cut out 30 acres (120,000 m^{2}) for a village of Clover Hill, including 2 acres (8,100 m^{2}) for a courthouse site.

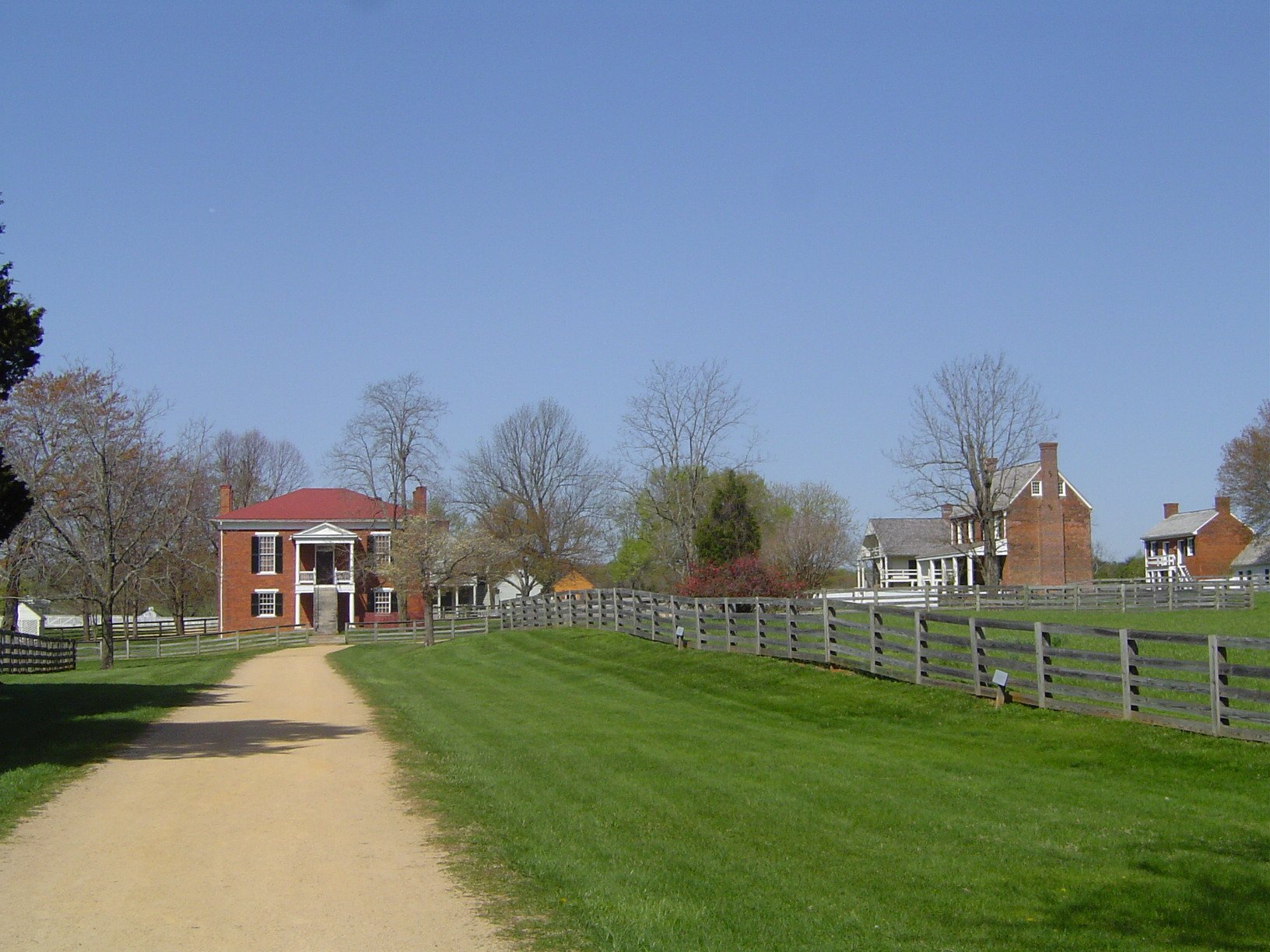
Village of Appomattox Court House

McDearmon was a Democrat and had been serving in the Virginia House of Delegates from Prince Edward County when the new county was created, and he was a resident of that portion of Prince Edward that became a part of the new Appomattox County. McDearmon was very interested in seeing the development and success of the county seat for the new jurisdiction. He lived just a few hundred yards from the center of the small village in what is known today as the Peers House. In August 1845 he had borrowed over two thousand dollars from his uncle Samuel J. Daniel (1787–1850) to invest in Clover Hill real estate, and thus began to play a critical role in the development of the village of Clover Hill (after 1845 officially Appomattox Court House), where Robert E. Lee surrendered to Ulysses S. Grant on April 9, 1865. McDearmon was one of eight trustees of the newly formed village in 1845. By 1847 his tavern and store lots in town had increased in value to $4100 from the purchase value of $3300. By 1848 the value of improvements was $5960. In 1851 McDearmon built the Union Academy and Hall ($1100) on a 1-acre (4,000 m^{2}) lot carved from his Clover Hill tract.

Samuel McDearmon was the first to be elected the new county's representative to the House of Delegates, serving 1846-1847 and again 1850–1851. Previously in the early 1840s he had been deputy sheriff for Campbell County and Prince Edward County. In 1851 McDearmon was elected to serve in the Virginia State Senate 1852–1854, representing Appomattox, Campbell and Lynchburg City after a tumultuous race. His political success can be at least partially attributed to his inherited money and wealth. At the height of his political and financial career (1849–1851) he built a new residence for his young family, the McDearmon-Tibbs "Clover Hill" house overlooking the Court House village (Appomattox Court House National Historical Park ruins).

Also during these heady days McDearmon had striven mightily to promote the Southside Railroad (Virginia) as a boon to the new county (and himself). Disappointed when the railway bypassed Clover Hill for Appomattox Station, he nonetheless bid for and secured the masonry contract for the railroad's spectacular project at Farmville: the High Bridge (Appomattox River). But McDearmon's over-ambitious plans were dashed: in May 1853 the original 3,100-foot-long (940 m) design was reduced by a third, eliminating a third of McDearmon's projected brick production. This reverse and his over-extended real-estate investments at Clover Hill caused McDearmon to put his holdings under the trusteeship of his father, brother Dr John R. McDearmon (1817–1876) and brother-in-law James C. Walton (1819–1880), reserving Mary F. P. McDearmon's still valuable "dower rights." Within the next few years he would complete a move from Clover Hill to Appomattox Station.

Whatever the ultimate success of his various ventures McDearmon had begun to develop business relationships in a wider field. William C. Flournoy, delegate from Prince Edward 1850-1853 had been his partner in the High Bridge masonry contract. In 1852 he partnered with fellow southside Virginians as McDearmon, Scott & Booker commission merchants in Richmond. His support for fellow democrat Henry A. Wise for the governorship in 1855 produced an appointment at Richmond's Shockoe warehouse as tobacco inspector, an office of historic although declining importance in the commonwealth. By 1860 he had established another partnership in Richmond as McDearmon & Chamberlayne with his second at Shockoe, Edwin H. Chamberlayne.

McDearmon was a major (1845) and later colonel in the 174th (Appomattox) Regiment of the Virginia Militia from 1849 to 1855. He served as an aide to now Brig. Gen. Henry A. Wise, commander of "Wise's Legion" during the Kanawha campaign in the American Civil War and was part of the Virginia volunteer troops that were trying to keep Union forces out of western Virginia. Following the defeat of Wise's forces in 1861 McDearmon limited his service to providing the army with lumber and other essential supplies. He was collector of the Confederate tax for Appomattox 1863–1865. By war's end he was in the reserves with the young, the old and the infirm.

In the immediate aftermath of the war, Samuel D. McDearmon was appointed agent by the Freedmen's Bureau to represent the county's black population in actions before the Bureau's "court" for peace-keeping between the races.

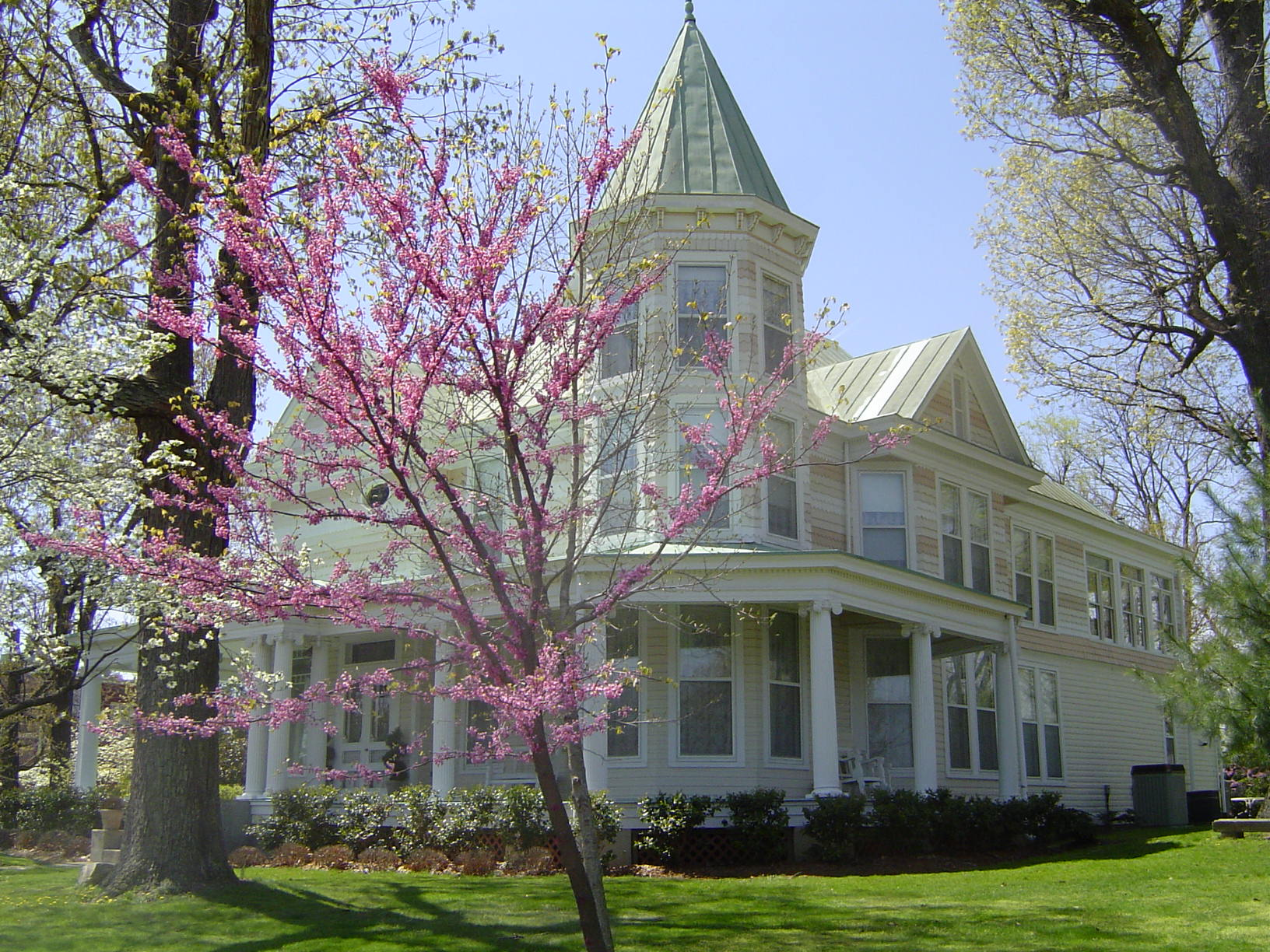
Nebraska House

McDearmon opened a store in 1855 near Appomattox Station in what was then called the town of Nebraska and is called today Appomattox, Virginia. He soon became an agent for the Southside Railroad, which passed through the village and had a depot there. He became the first postmaster for "Nebraska"; the town was called "Nebraska" from 1855 until 1895. It was then renamed "West Appomattox" since the official county seat of Appomattox Court House (formerly Clover Hill) was three miles (4.8 km) east. Eventually the "West" was dropped when Appomattox Court House became a historical park and the railroad town became known simply as Appomattox, Virginia. McDearmon built a large six-room Virginia farmhouse there in 1855, less than one hundred yards from the train station; the house eventually came to be known as the Nebraska House.

By 1870 S.D. McDearmon had sufficiently recouped his fortunes to declare 600 acres (2.4 km^{2}) worth $8000 in the county by the agricultural census for that year. In addition he had two milling operations: a gristmill ("Evergreen Mills") in partnership with his brother-in-law James D. Calhoun (1810–1885) with a capital investment of $2000; and a sawmill employing eight men capitalized at $800. His restoration to solvency was however short-lived. The Lynchburg Republican recorded his death "in the fifty seventh year of his age" at his residence, May 16, 1871.

== Children ==
The couple's children were

- Mary Elizabeth McDearmon (b. 1836) married first David A. Plunkett (1826–1860) and second Cornelius Hill.
- Victoria McDearmon (d.infans)
- William James McDearmon (1844–1925) married Mary Frances Stickley (1851–1890)
- Samuel Walton McDearmon (b. 1845) married Judith L. Atwood.
- John Hampden McDearmon (1850–1885) married Sarah J. Wright
