= Bloody Lane =

Historic battlefield site of intense Civil War combat

Bloody Lane (Sunken Road)
- Part of Battle of Antietam
- Sharpsburg, Maryland
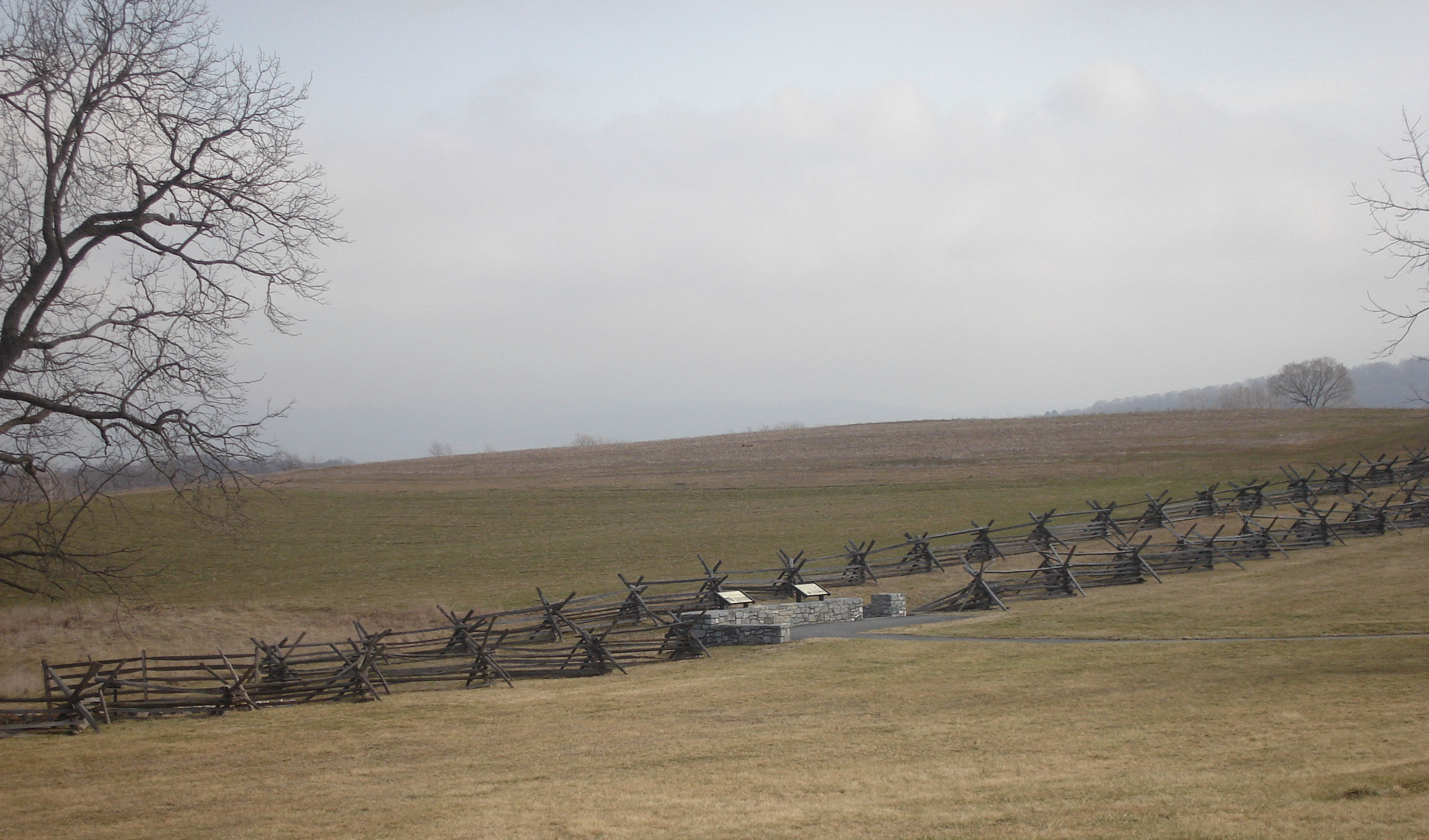
- Looking south along the former Sunken Road

Site information
- Owner: United States National Park Service
- Condition: Preserved and interpreted

Location
- Coordinates: 39°28′30″N 77°44′40″W

Site history
- Built: Early 19th century (eroded farm lane)
- In use: September 17, 1862
- Materials: Dirt, rail fences
- Battles/wars: Battle of Antietam

The Bloody Lane, also known as the Sunken Road, is a preserved section of the Antietam National Battlefield in Maryland. It served as a natural defensive trench for Confederate soldiers during the Battle of Antietam on September 17, 1862. This small farm lane became one of the most iconic sites of the battle due to the intense and deadly fighting that occurred there. It remains a central feature of the battlefield and a poignant reminder of the staggering casualties the American Civil War produced.

== Topography and defensive significance ==
By 1862, the Sunken Road had been deeply worn into the Maryland landscape by generations of farming wagons and livestock. It connected the Hagerstown turnpike to the Boonsboro turnpike halfway between Sharpsburg and Antietam Creek. The heavy travel along the lane to a gristmill had worn down the road surface until it was below ground level. The depression, up to four feet deep in places, stretched between two farmsteads and offered excellent natural cover. Confederate Major General D.H. Hill deployed approximately 2,600 troops (primarily North Carolinians and Alabamians) along the road, reinforcing it with fence rails to form a crude parapet. It quickly became a formidable makeshift trench, well-suited to defensive operations against advancing Union forces.

Hill had posted two brigades in the road, those of Brigadier Generals Robert E. Rodes and George B. Anderson, with Rodes' troops on the left and Anderson's soldiers on the right. Fragments of the brigades belonging to Colonels Alfred H. Colquitt and Duncan K. McRae, driven from Miller's Cornfield and the East Woods earlier in the battle, supported Rodes' brigade. The small Cobb's Legion, separated from the division of Maj. Gen. Lafayette McLaws, joined them, led by Lieutenant Colonel Luther Glenn due to the absence of their commander, politician Howell Cobb.

== The battle unfolds ==
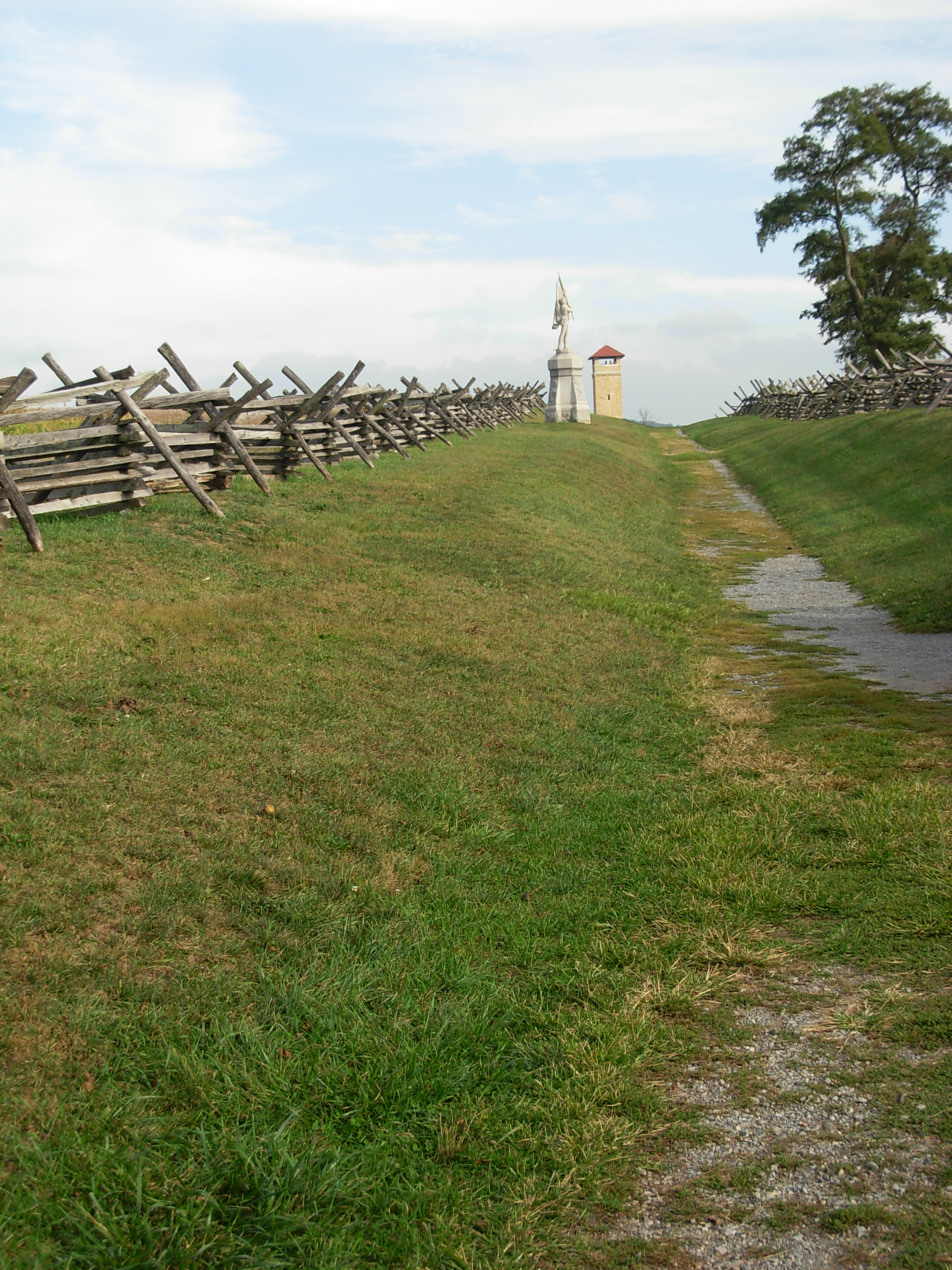
The Bloody Lane today

At about 9:30 a.m., elements of Union Maj. Gen. Edwin V. Sumner's II Corps, primarily the divisions of Brigadier Generals William H. French and Israel B. Richardson, advanced toward the lane. The brigade of Brig. Gen. Max Weber led the advance, chasing Rebel skirmishers out of the buildings belonging to local farmer William Roulette before moving on to a low ridge running along the front of the Sunken Road. The troops received the order to fix bayonets and charge over meadows and plowed fields without cover. Confederate defenders unloaded several volleys, and in five minutes Weber's brigade suffered more than 450 casualties. The Federal troops broke and fell back over the crest, where they rallied and returned fire.

Weber's brigade was reinforced by the brigade of Col. Dwight Morris, but this unit also consisted of rookie soldiers. The 108th New York Infantry Regiment lost nearly half its strength within minutes of deployment. For the inexperienced regiment, many of whose members had enlisted only weeks earlier, it was a baptism by fire in the most literal sense. Flustered and confused, some men from Morris' brigade fired into Weber's troops, subjecting them to a hail of bullets from front and rear. Some of Morris' Pennsylvanians and New Yorkers reached the brow of the ridge to join Weber's brigade as the Rebels kept up the firing and loading. Maj. Gen. James Longstreet, commanding the Confederate right flank, ordered Rhodes' men to counterattack in the belief the Union lines were disorderly, but while charging up the glassy slope beyond the Sunken Road they came under devastating enfilading artillery fire.

The only veteran regiments of French's division belonged to the brigade of Brig. Gen. Nathan Kimball, later dubbed by French as the Gibraltar Brigade. They, too, received the order to attack Hill's Rebels at speed and with bayonets fixed, but like the other brigades, fell in great numbers. By 10:30 a.m., the offensive power of French's division was spent. It was eventually reinforced by the 4,000 men of Richardson's division, too late to attack in concert. At roughly the same time, however, Longstreet ordered the division of Maj. Gen. Richard H. Anderson to support Hill's troops. Frustrated Yankees, unable to dent Hill's line, focused on Anderson's men, leading to the wounding of Anderson and one of his brigade commanders, Brig. Gen. Ambrose R. Wright. With Anderson incapacitated, divisional command passed to Brig. Gen. Roger A. Pryor, who, like Cobb, owed his rank more to political status than military skill. The rest of the Confederate command took heavy casualties. George B. Anderson was wounded near the ankle by a Minié ball, which shattered the bone. Despite initial hopes of returning to duty, he died of complications following amputation. Colonel John B. Gordon, leading the 6th Alabama Infantry Regiment, was shot multiple times, including in the face. He collapsed face-first into his cap and might have drowned in his blood if it hadn't drained out through a bullet hole in the fabric.

As Richardson's division arrived, Brigadier General Thomas Francis Meagher's Irish Brigade joined the fray, launching a frontal assault through open ground. Their green regimental flags stood out vividly amid smoke and blood, and they endured withering fire to reach within fifty yards of the Confederate line. Nevertheless, the entrenched defenders held their ground. The 63rd and 69th New York each lost around 60 percent of their numbers, most of them in the first few minutes of combat. Waves of Federal troops charging down the hill toward the road were cut down as relentless gunfire ripped through their ranks. Southern soldiers, densely packed along the road, unleashed some of the most intense musket fire of the entire war.

== Turning point and collapse ==
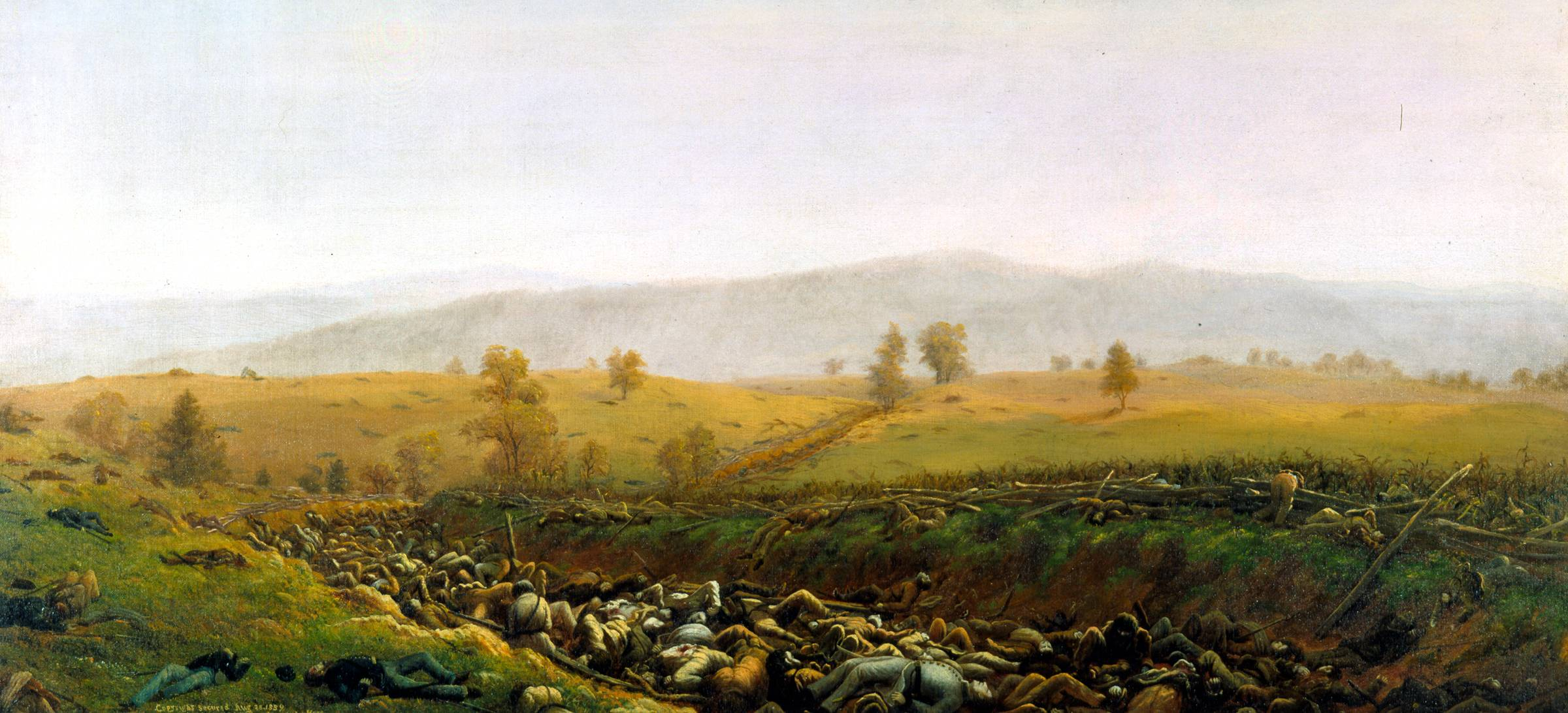
Artist's depiction of the Bloody Lane

As the fighting wore on past noon, Union forces eventually gained a tactical advantage through flanking maneuvers. Due to Pryor's inexperience, the regiments of Anderson's brigade arrived piecemeal, causing greater casualties among the firing line. After repelling the Irish Brigade at high cost, the Rebels looked with dismay at the oncoming Union brigade of Brig. Gen. John C. Caldwell. Colonel Francis C. Barlow's brigade swung south around the Confederate right, ascending a slight rise and pouring enfilading fire down the length of the lane. Confederate resistance crumbled under this deadly crossfire. The lane, once a defensive asset, had become a trap and a natural funnel for bullets. Colonel Carnot Posey attempted to have his Mississippi regiments fall back only to trigger a general retreat and a break in the Confederate position.

Observing the sudden collapse, Richardson's division surged forward, routing Hill's remaining forces. Yet even in victory, the Union command hesitated. Cobb's Legion and the 27th North Carolina Infantry under Col. John Rogers Cooke moved from the West Woods to attack the Federal right flank along the Sunken Road. The Union forces held, however, and were soon supported by brigades from Maj. Gen. "Baldy" Smith's division. No immediate exploitation followed the breakthrough, and Confederate reserves soon stabilized the southern portion of the battlefield. Around 1 p.m., Richardson realized the Confederate lines had stabilized and ordered his men pulled back across Bloody Lane to the shelter of the ridgeline.

The Bloody Lane settled into a stalemate until 5 p.m. when Col. William H. Irwin, one of Smith's brigade commanders, ordered the 7th Maine Infantry Regiment to clear out Rebel sharpshooters from a nearby farm. Major Thomas W. Hyde protested the order, claiming the farm would require a brigade and not a single regiment to take, but Irwin overruled him. The 7th Maine attacked but came under fire from three sides and had to retreat, but not without losing half their number. Hyde later claimed that Irwin was a known drunkard and had given the order under the influence of "John Barleycorn."

== Casualties and psychological impact ==
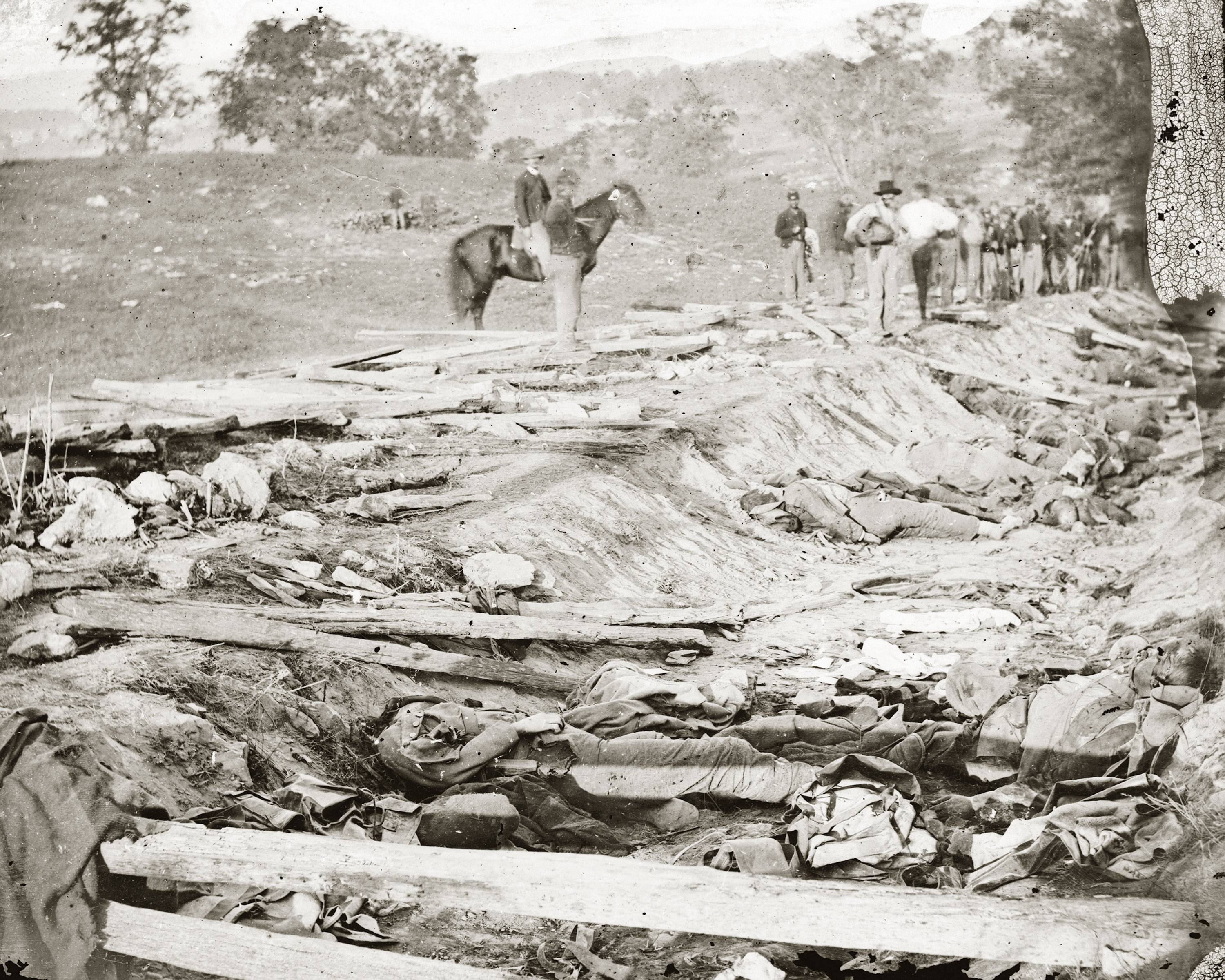
Confederate dead at Bloody Lane, looking northeast from the south bank

Sergeant James Shinn of the 4th North Carolina watched as hundreds of Confederate soldiers broke and fled, later recording in his diary:

"The Minie balls, shot and shell rained upon us from every direction except the rear. Many men took this chance to leave the field entirely. Many officers were killed and wounded, and I am sorry and ashamed to say, left the field unhurt."

Nearly 2,000 Confederate soldiers were killed or wounded along the road, marking a pivotal turning point in the battle.

For many of the soldiers involved, Bloody Lane became synonymous with the carnage of modern war. The scale of killing shocked both the public and military leadership. Though technically a tactical success for the Union, the broader strategic results were mixed, as General George B. McClellan again hesitated to pursue the retreating Confederate army.

== Legacy and preservation ==
Today, the Bloody Lane is a central feature of the Antietam National Battlefield. Visitors can walk a marked trail that follows the path of the original road, now stabilized by the National Park Service. To preserve the landscape as it appeared in the 1860s, the National Park Service leases the historic farmland to contemporary farmers. Today, common uses include growing feed corn and soybeans, as well as dairy farming. The landscape, still eerily quiet, has been called one of the most evocative Civil War sites in the country.
