= Sunken road (disambiguation) =

A sunken road is a road that is lower than the land on either side.

Sunken road or Sunken Road may also refer to:

- The Bloody Lane, a sunken road and the location of the most intense combat at the Battle of Antietam
- Sunken Road (Shiloh), a feature of the "Hornet's Nest" at the Battle of Shiloh
- Sunken road (obstacle), a type of obstacle used in horse jumping and equestrian competitions
