= Edwin Otway Burnham =

American Congregational minister and missionary (1824–1873)

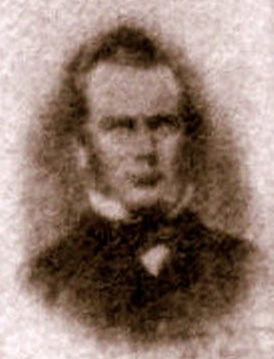
- Title: Pastor

Personal life
- Born: September 24, 1824 Ghent, Kentucky, United States
- Died: August 1, 1873 (aged 48) Los Angeles, California, United States

Religious life
- Religion: Presbyterian
- School: Hamilton College, Union Theological Seminary
- Lineage: Thomas Burnham
- Ordination: July 18, 1852

Senior posting
- Based in: United States
- Post: Missionary at Tivoli, Minnesota (Sioux indian reservation near Mankato)
- Period in office: 1852-1870
- Previous post: Pennington, New Jersey, United States

Rev Edwin Otway Burnham (September 24, 1824 – August 1, 1873) was a Congregational minister and missionary.

He was born in Ghent, Kentucky, his father died when he was 5 and his mother died the following year. He and his younger sister, Caroline, moved to Madison, New York to live with their grandfather Abner Burnham, a soldier of the American Revolutionary War, but Abner died soon thereafter. Burnham graduated Hamilton College, New York, in 1852 and was a member of the Delta Upsilon fraternity. On July 18, 1852, he was ordained, after having been stated supply at Columbus City, Iowa and he became a student at Union Theological Seminary in New York (1852–55). He graduated in 1855 and was licensed as a preacher of the gospel. He was a teacher in Pennington, New Jersey (1855–56), and a Pastor of Congressional Church in Wilton, Minnesota (1859–61). At Tivoli, Minnesota, an Indian Reservation, he preached and served as a missionary and also served as stated supply (1861–71). An exceptional marksman with a Kentucky long rifle, Burnham could consistently split in two a soft lead slug placed on an axe head from 100 and 200 yards. To most he was known as, "a Kentucky frontiersman and rifle shooting parson who could bark a squirrel, swing an axe or dispense Gospel with equal ferver and efficiency."

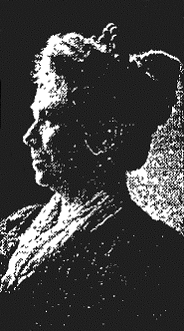
Rebecca Russell Burnham, wife

Burnham was a key figure in the defense of New Ulm, Minnesota, helping to prevent the town from total destruction as it was attacked by Taoyateduta (Little Crow) and his Sioux warriors in the Dakota War of 1862. While he was in Mankato, Minnesota procuring lead and powder, his wife Rebecca (Elizabeth) Russell Burnham was left alone in the cabin with Fred, the couple's not quite two-year-old boy. While brushing her hair, she froze at the flashing glimpse of war paint and war bonnets moving through the forest. Gathering up baby Fred, she realized she could not escape while carrying him, so she hid her baby in a stack of green corn shocks, running fast and deceptively to evade the Sioux war party. She reached a friendly homestead six miles away in time to see the smoke of her cabin. Returning the next morning with armed neighbors, Rebecca saw her burned-down cabin and she found her baby Fred still in the corn husks and still alive.

Sometime after the Sioux hostilities had ended, Burnham sustained major injuries which led to his early death. He was carrying the logs from the ruins of his former cabin to build a barn when he slipped on an ice patch. As he fell, the log he was carrying crushed his chest resulting in compound rib fractures and the puncturing of one of his lungs. His failing health compelled him to give up the ministry, and in 1870 he moved his family to California—then a two-week trip by rail through still visible buffalo herds. From 1871 to 1873 he was an invalid. He died of consumption (tuberculosis) in Los Angeles, California.

With the passing of Edwin, Rebecca and her two surviving children, Fred, then 11, and Howard, then 3, were left destitute. An uncle in Clinton, Iowa offered the family a home, but there was no money for the return journey. A family friend in Los Angeles, Mrs. Porter, lent Rebecca $125 for the trip; however, Fred steadfastly refused to leave, determined to find a job to provide his family some support and to repay Mrs. Porter, so Rebecca boarded the train with only baby Howard. Fred was an outstanding horse rider, and he knew the environs around Los Angeles, so he landed a job as a mounted messenger with Western Union. Even at this young age, Fred had already learned woodcraft from his frontiersman father. By the time he was 12, Fred was an expert with rifle or shotgun, hunting deer in Los Angeles, and at 13 he bought a Winchester model 1873 carbine, caliber .44-40. By 14, he had repaid his mother's debt to Mrs. Porter and he left California to live with his mother, brother, and uncle in Iowa.

== Family ==
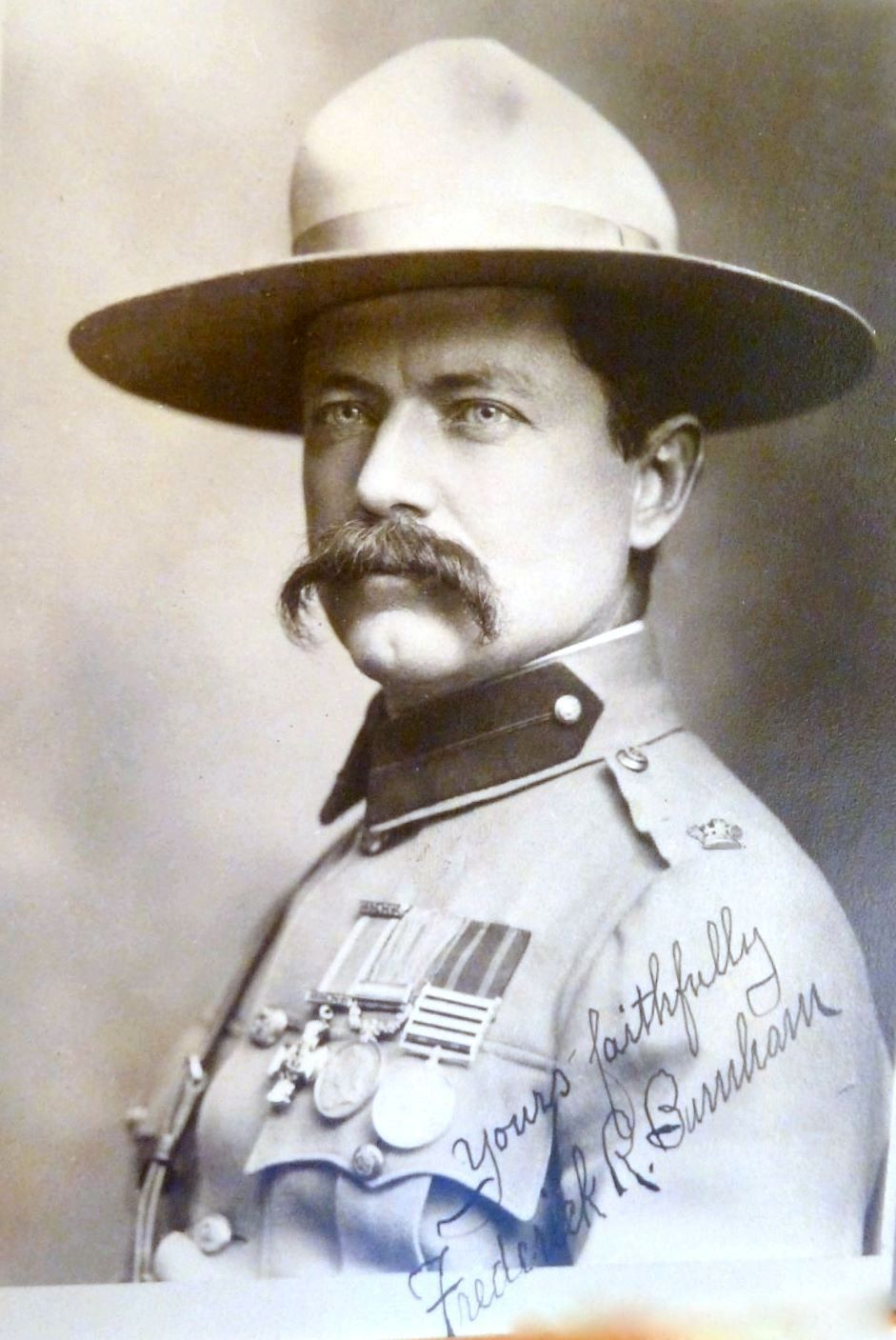
Maj Frederick Russell Burnham, eldest son

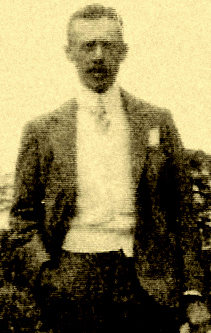
Howard Burnham, youngest son

Burnham was a descendant of Thomas Burnham (1617–1688) of Hartford, Connecticut, the first American ancestor of a large number of Burnhams. His father was Dr. Frederick Burnham (November 16, 1787 – ca. March 31, 1829) of East Hartford, Connecticut, a soldier invalided in the War of 1812 who went south to Kentucky to practice medicine, and his mother was Harriet (Woolridge) Burnham (April 14, 1794 – April 23, 1830). On July 3, 1860, he married Rebecca (Elizabeth) Russell Burnham [Clapp] (July 12, 1842 – 1905) of Westminster, Middlesex, England in Sterling Township, Blue Earth, Minnesota. The family had three sons and one daughter, all born in Minnesota:

- Frederick Russell Burnham (May 11, 1861 – September 1, 1947), the eldest son, became a highly decorated Major in the British Army, scouting in Africa and the United States, and the father of the international Scouting movement.
- Edward Russell Burnham (November 29, 1863 – September 4, 1866)
- Mary Maylin Burnham (November 7, 1867, July 14, 1868)
- Matther Howard Burnham (May 27, 1870 – 1918), moved to Africa with his brother Fred, he was the chief chemist for a mine in Johannesburg, South Africa. During World War I worked behind enemy lines in southwest Germany as spy for France.
