= Howard Mather Burnham =

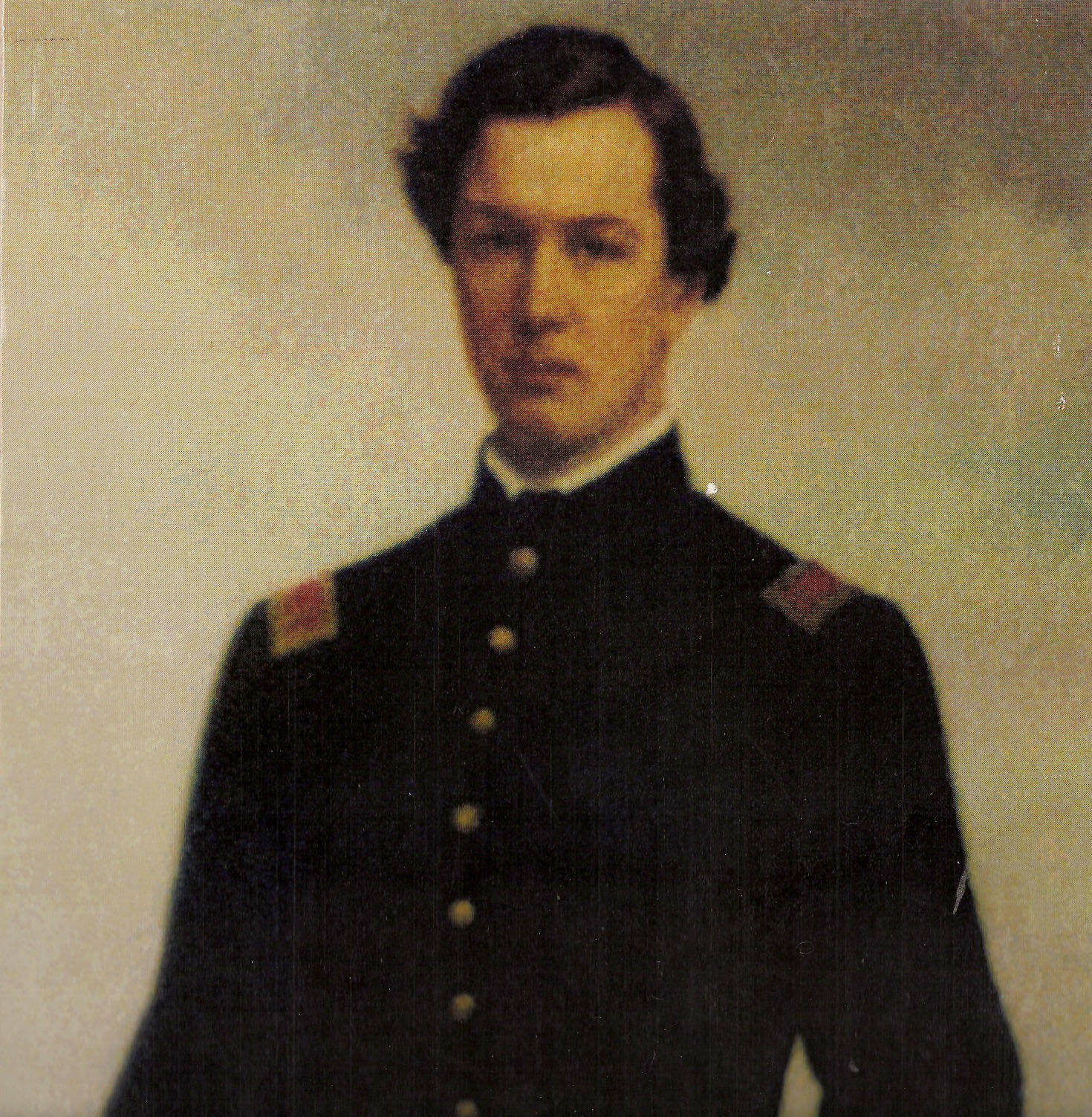
- Lt. Howard M. Burnham
- Born: March 17, 1842; Longmeadow, Massachusetts
- Died: September 19, 1863 (aged 21); Chickamauga, Georgia
- Burial place: Longmeadow Cemetery, Longmeadow, Massachusetts
- Military career
- Allegiance: United States of America; Union
- Branch: Union Army
- Service years: 1861–1863 (USA)
- Rank: First Lieutenant
- Commands: Battery H, 5th U.S. Artillery
- Conflicts: American Civil War: Battle of Chickamauga †

Howard Mather Burnham (March 17, 1842 – September 19, 1863), was a Union Army artillery officer in the American Civil War who was killed in action at the Battle of Chickamauga.

== Early life ==
Burnham attended a military school in Hamden, Connecticut, and upon graduation he attended Sanborn's school in Concord, Massachusetts and Lawrence Scientific School (now known as Harvard School of Engineering and Applied Sciences) in Cambridge, Massachusetts. Soon after the Massachusetts Volunteers were attacked in Baltimore, Maryland, he enlisted in the Springfield City Guards on April 19, 1861.

== Military career ==
Burnham was sent to the 10th Regiment Massachusetts Volunteer Infantry and received a commission as a second lieutenant in the 5th Regiment, United States Artillery in the Union Army. He served impatiently for several months as a Union Army recruiting officer in Towanda and Philadelphia, Pennsylvania, New York City, and Dubuque, Iowa, until he was ordered to Fort Hamilton on garrison duty. He went to Washington, D.C., for an assignment as Aide-de-camp to his uncle, Major General Joseph K. Mansfield, commander of the XII Corps, Army of the Potomac, but before he had the chance to join his staff, Mansfield was killed at the Battle of Antietam.

In April 1863, Burnham was promoted to first lieutenant and joined the Battery H, 5th U.S. Artillery of the Army of the Cumberland under General William Rosecrans. Following the departure of First Lieutenant Francis Guenther (promoted), as senior lieutenant present, Burnham assumed command in August 1863 in absence of the battery's captain (George A. Kensel); shortly after assuming command of Battery H, as the senior Regular Army artillery officer in the division, he was appointed Chief of Artillery of the 1st Division, XIV Corps, on the staff of Gen. Absalom Baird.

=== Battle of Chickamauga ===
On the morning of September 19, 1863, Burnham was directing his artillery battery in the thick woods near Jay's Mill at the Battle of Chickamauga. With Confederate troops charging his position, he attempted to bring his battery horses forward to limber and haul off the guns, but alert Confederates shot the animals as soon as they were within sight. With no chance of escape, he ordered his gunners to load their four M1857 12-pounder Napoleons with double-shotted canister to repel the enemy infantry. Battery H opened up as soon as supporting infantry skirmishers were clear, causing the Confederates to take cover. The infantrymen in front of the guns occupied a slightly lower elevation and saw the shot flying over their heads. But Battery H did not have much infantry support and enemy fire quickly shot down their gunners. Second Lieutenant Israel Ludlow was also injured and captured during the action. Burnham was shot in the chest and mortally wounded. When the sole remaining battery officer, Second Lieutenant Joshua A. Fessenden, asked Burnham if he was hurt, he responded: "Not much, but save the guns!"

In Fessenden's battle report, he stated:

During the morning, after an all night march, we were ordered forward by General King. The battery was hardly in position before the troops on the right gave way and it was exposed to a most terrific fire of musketry from front and flank. General King ordered us to limber to the rear, but it was impossible to execute the order, since many of the cannoneers were either killed or wounded, and the horses shot at the limbers. At the first fire, Lieut. Burnham fell mortally wounded; Lieut. Ludlow was also wounded and fell into the enemy's hands, and myself slightly wounded in the side. The battery was taken by the enemy, after firing sixteen rounds of canister.

Fessenden had been shot in the hip, but he assumed command when Burnham and Ludlow fell. Battery H was overrun, but Fessenden successfully rallied his troops, recaptured his artillery pieces, and even captured one Confederate gun. Fessenden's men hauled off the pieces, but without their ammunition caissons, as these had to be abandoned through lack of horses. As the battle continued, Burnham survived for another two hours. In addition to Burnham, forty-two men in his command were either killed or wounded, and more than one-third of the horses were shot.

Gen. John King dispatched the following in his report:

I take this occasion to speak in the highest terms of the officers of Battery H, 5th Artillery, 1st Lieut. H. M. Burnham and 2d Lieutenants Israel Ludlow and J. A. Fessenden. The officers of this battery, finding it impossible to retire, remained with their pieces, firing, until they were forcibly taken from them by the enemy.

== Family ==
Burnham was a descendant of Thomas Burnham (1617–1688) of Hartford, Connecticut, the first American ancestor of a large number of Burnhams. The descendants of Thomas Burnham have been noted in every American war, including the French and Indian War.

- Roderick Henry Burnham, Esq. (February 27, 1816 – April 1, 1893) of Longmeadow, Massachusetts, a member of the Massachusetts Legislature from (1861–1862) and Justice of the Peace, father
- Katharine Livingstone Burnham (May 8, 1820 –July 13, 1885), daughter of Samuel Mather of Connecticut, a descendant of Rev. Richard Mather of Dorchester, Massachusetts
- Emily Livingston Burnham (May 17, 1849 – November 10, 1871), sister.
- Mather Howard Burnham (1870–1917), who became a spy for France in World War I, and Frederick Russell Burnham, the celebrated scout, (1861–1947) were his second cousins.

== Bibliography ==
- Anonymous (1864). Memorial of Lieutenant Howard M. Burnham, United States Army, who fell in the Battle of Chickamauga. Springfield, Mass: Samuel Bowles and Co. pp. 1–89. ISBN 1-115-95275-7.
- Burnham, Roderick Henry (1884). Genealogical Records of Thomas Burnham, the Emigrant, who was Among the Early Settlers at Hartford, Connecticut, U.S. America, and His Descendants. Hartford, CT: Case, Lockwood & Brainard Co. ISBN 1-112-19164-X.
