= Howard Burnham =

American mining engineer and spy (1870-1917)

Mather Howard Burnham
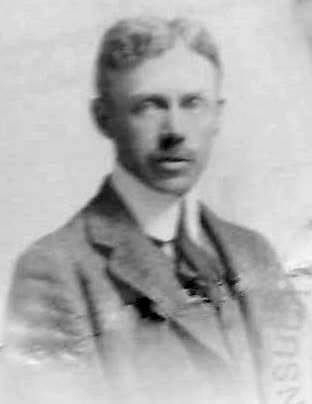
- M. Howard Burnham, 1915
- Born: May 27, 1870; Tivoli, Minnesota (near Mankato), United States
- Died: May 4, 1917 (aged 46); New York City, US
- Burial place: France, Cannes, Cimetière du Grand Jas, Allée 19 partie Protestante, Concession Perpétuelle.
- Education: Michigan Technological University
- Occupations: Mining engineer, Spy
- Spouses: Margaret; Constance Newton (Connie)
- Children: 4
- Parent(s): Rev Edwin Otway Burnham; Rebecca Russell Burnham
- Espionage activity
- Allegiance: United States, France
- Service years: World War I

Mather Howard Burnham (May 27, 1870 – May 4, 1917), was an American who went by the name of Howard; his brother was the celebrated scout Frederick Russell Burnham. He traveled the world, frequently worked as a mining engineer and, during World War I, he became an intelligence officer and spy for the government of France. He had a wooden leg which he used to conceal tools for spying when he was behind enemy lines.

== Early life ==
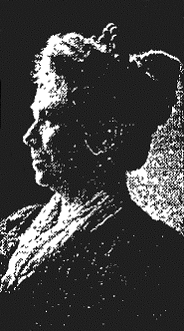
Rebecca Russell Burnham, mother

Burnham was born to a missionary family on a Sioux Indian reservation in Tivoli, Minnesota (near Mankato), just before his family moved to Los Angeles, California. He was named after his cousin Lieutenant Howard Mather Burnham, a United States Army Civil War officer who was killed in action in the Battle of Chickamauga. His father, the Rev. Edwin Otway Burnham of Kentucky, a long time frontiersman and a missionary, died when Burnham was only 3, leaving the family destitute. He and his mother, Rebecca (Elizabeth) Russell Burnham, originally from Westminster, Middlesex, England, left to live with an Uncle in Iowa, but his brother Fred, then 12, stayed in California to repay the family debts and to make his own way.

At 14, Burnham was in school in Massachusetts. Ill with an injured leg, his brother sent him the money to return to Los Angeles. His leg was removed four inches below the knee. He also suffered from tuberculosis, and following the amputation, he had a long convalescence. For those two years, he lived with his brother, who taught him how to shoot, saddle a horse and pack animals, the art of scoutcraft and how to ride the range, and all of this in spite of his wooden leg. A voracious reader with an amazing memory, he enjoyed books on military strategies and tactics and was fascinated by history, geology, metallurgy, and mining. He roamed the deserts from Death Valley to lower California, living among and learning from the Cahuilla Indians of Agua Caliente (now Palm Springs, California), and teaming up at times with solitary prospectors to learn desert prospecting, pocket hunting, and the mysteries of the "great horn spoon" (probably the California Gold Rush).

In 1888, during one of his desert prospecting excursions, Burnham had a shoot-out with an Indian (not Cahuilla). He was on an old trail leading over the mountains between Kawia and San Jacinto and less than an hour before the attack he met an Indian with whom he had a conversation in Spanish. Burnham continued on the trail until he heard a slight report and felt something hit his right leg, and then a second report resulting in a flesh wound to his left leg. He immediately threw himself flat on the ground and commenced cautiously eyeing the surrounding country for the enemy. When saw a hat rising from behind a rock about 150 yards away, he drew his pistol and fired on the hat. His enemy fled down the Los Coyotes creek, down the canyon trail Burnham had been following, with the intent to assume a new ambush. Burnham recognized his enemy as the Indian he had met a short time earlier and he knew that this Indian was carrying a Winchester rifle and had him out-gunned. Burnham left his pack animal, tools, provisions and blankets and quickly fled on his horse down a steep cliff away from the trail and to safety in San Jacinto.

For the next few years, Burnham studied mining and worked on and off in the California desert as mining engineer at the Alvord mine, a gold mine owned and operated by the Burnham-Clapp family and their Pasadena business partners 1885–1891. He received his professional mining certification from the Pacific Chemical Works of San Francisco, an assay company owned and operated by Henry Garber Hanks, the first State Mineralogist for California.

== South Africa and Rhodesia ==
After the Alvord mine in California was destroyed in a fire, Burnham stayed in California until 1894 to wrap up his family's affairs with the mine and left for the South African Republic as soon as he could to join his brother Fred already in Bulawayo, Matabeleland. He soon found work as a mining engineer and was in charge of the assay laboratory and smelting room at the Langlaagte Royal Mine in the Transvaal. In 1895, he was preparing to accompany his brother in a massive expedition into Northern Rhodesia when he took ill and was forced to leave for Europe to recuperate. He left for Germany accompanied by his nephew Roderick, and the two of them then went to London, England. In 1895, he married his first wife Margaret. He returned to the United States and from 1896 to 1898 attended the Michigan Mining School (now Michigan Technological University), graduating with an S.B. By September 1898, he and his wife were back in Africa and he was working for an English syndicate and supervising over 2,000 miners at the Rosa deep gold mine near Johannesburg, South Africa. While in the Transvaal, Burnham was a chief chemist, an engineer, and an assistant inspector for mines, and he wrote a textbook: Modern Mine Valuation.

When the Second Boer War broke out in 1899, Burnham felt he would be protected because of his American citizenship. Initially, he remained at his post in the mines in the Boer Republic, but as a precaution, he sent his wife to Cape Town, South Africa, then a British colony. But the situation in Johannesburg quickly worsened. The Boers seized the mine and began working it for their own benefit. Burnham traveled to East London, South Africa to inform the syndicate directors of the situation. He was captured by the British and held 24 hrs before he could prove that he was an American citizen. When he started back to Johannesburg, he was captured by the Boers, who took him for a British spy. For a time, he was uncertain if he would be shot or hanged. He wired his family for funds to help get him out of his predicament. Only weeks earlier, his brother had been prospecting in Alaska during the Klondike Gold Rush when he received a telegram from Lord Roberts requesting his assistance in the war – Fred left for Africa within the hour. Fred Burnham had just been appointed Chief of Scouts for the British Army and was en route to South Africa via England, but he was still too distant to provide any immediate help.

Over the next few years, he lived in England and South Africa. He gave lectures and contributed a series of articles on mining techniques and the sundry principles underlying the finance of mining enterprises, more especially the "risk rate." In London on November 18, 1903, Burnham married Constance Newton, then a young school teacher and an heiress to Newton, Chambers & Company, whom he had met on the ship during their voyage to South Africa. From 1905 until about 1908, Burnham was a non-resident fellow at the Royal Colonial Institute in London.

== Mexico ==
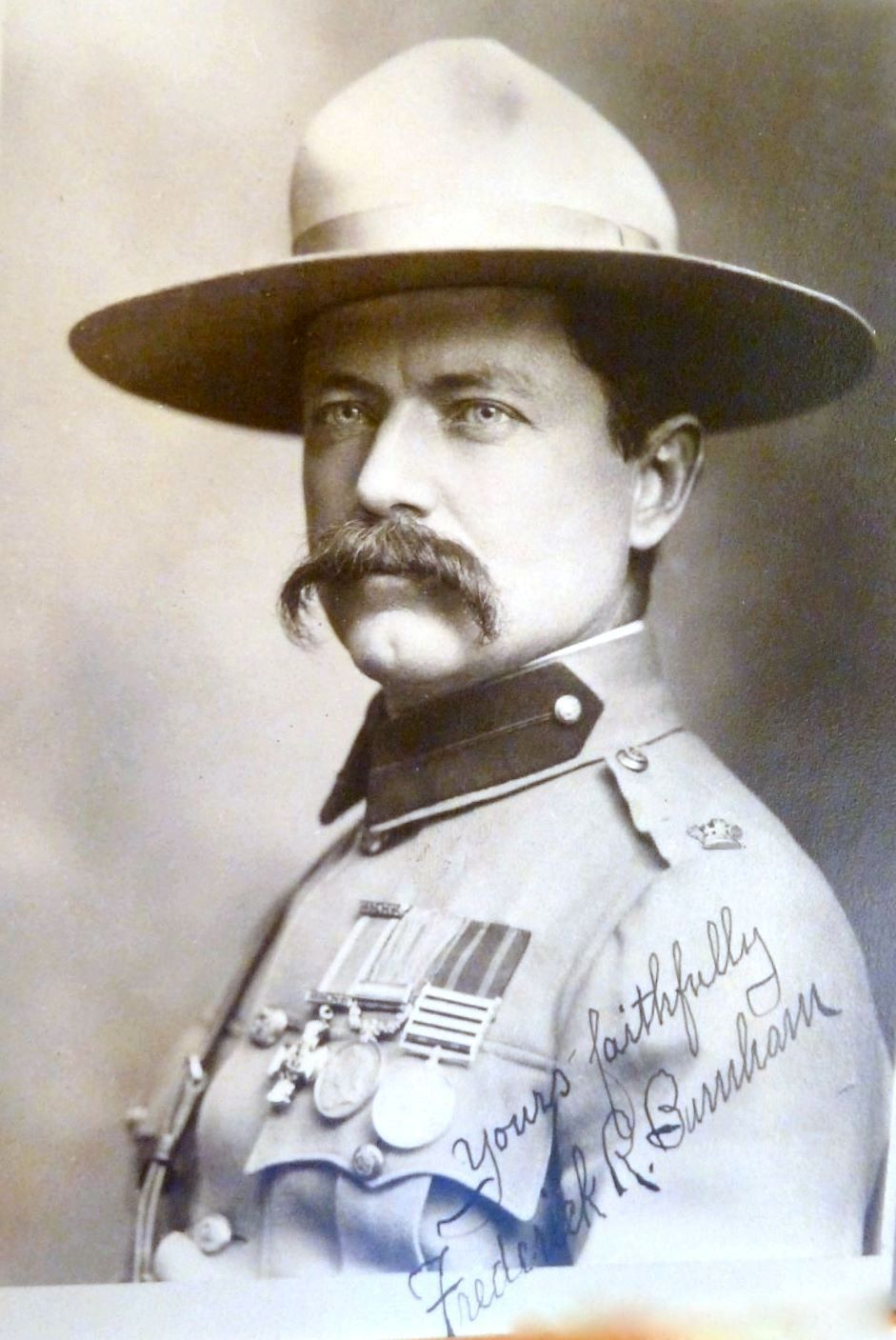
Maj Frederick Russell Burnham, DSO, brother

While his wife and children stayed in England and France, Burnham returned to North America in 1907 and for the next few years became associated with the Yaqui River irrigation project in Mexico with his brother Fred. In 1908, he and W. A. Wadham of London, England, took a month-long geology and mining trip through Sonora on behalf of American and English business partners. Negotiations were made for the purchase of four properties: the Batue, Mequite, La Fiera, and another property. He considered the La Fiera to be the best of the lot and a small force of men under the supervision of John Anderson was put to work there. In 1909, he traveled with Hector Walker of England on a 300-mile journey from Phoenix, Arizona into Mexico, and then east through Chihuahua and into the Sierra Madres to look for good grazing lands and minerals. His brother purchased water rights and some 300 acres (1.2 km^{2}) of land in this region and contacted an old friend of the Burnhams from Africa, John Hays Hammond, who conducted his own studies and then purchased an additional 900,000 acres (3,600 km^{2}) of this land—an area the size of Rhode Island. Just as the irrigation and mining projects were nearing completion in 1912, a long series of Mexican revolutions began. The final blow to Burnham-Hammond plans came in 1917 when Mexico passed laws prohibiting the sale of land to foreigners. The Burnham and the Hammond families carried their properties until 1930 and then sold them to the Mexican government.

== World War I Espionage ==
During World War I, Burnham worked in intelligence for France. In 1914, he was incarcerated near Tampico, Mexico as a suspected spy, and was released with the help of William Jennings Bryan, the U.S. Secretary of State. He immediately left Mexico for France and stopped in Barcelona, Spain on his way to Algiers, Algeria, then a French colony that the German Intelligence had infiltrated to support of the rebels. He was sent on a dangerous mission to lead 28 soldiers into the desert, meet with the rebels, and persuade them to make peace with the French. On the way, the group encountered a hostile clan, lost 20 men, exhausted all of their ammunition, and were taken prisoner. All were executed, except Burnham. A sheik elder with the clan had earlier gotten into trouble with the French in Algiers and Burnham had come to his defense, leading to the release of the man. Burnham returned to Algiers alone and was then sent to France.

In 1917, French intelligence then sent Burnham across enemy lines as a spy to discover if the Germans were preparing a new front through the Alps. Traveling through neutral Switzerland, Burnham assumed his former identity as an American mining engineer and crossed into Germany on the plea of extreme ill-health – his tuberculosis had violently resurfaced. Burnham had spent much time before the war in German spas, and his work for the French intelligence had been classified, so the real reason for his near-death return was not suspected by the authorities. Additionally, he was traveling with large quantities of American gold coins for his treatment and gold was desperately needed in wartime Germany. Nevertheless, Burnham was both searched and closely watched throughout his stay.

While in Germany, Burnham applied his engineering skills to converting simple household materials in useful surveying instruments, and he used his wooden leg to conceal these tools when he traveled to places such as Bad Nauheim. Due to the high cost of his treatments, $500 a month paid in gold, Burnham was a welcome visitor at every resort in Germany. Still, all of his correspondence was reviewed and at the insistence of German authorities he was frequently escorted by one or more nurses and a private secretary. Since he was unable to permanently record his surveys and other findings on paper, he relied on his remarkable memory.

Burnham became very ill and was allowed to return to Switzerland for his health. The French government quickly transported Burnham to Cannes, France. From his death bed, Burnham shared his secrets with other intelligence officers and the French government transported his family from England to Cannes. The data Burnham had gathered was convincing: the Germans were not opening a new front in Alps and there was no need to move allied troops away from the Western Front. His dying words he whispered to his surgeon: "Always have I wanted to help pay the debt my country has owed to France. Go back to the front and save the living. I am already dead." He was buried in Cannes beside the tomb of A. Kingsley Macomber, another American, to honor the French Admiral François Joseph Paul de Grasse whose fleet had enabled George Washington to force the surrender of Lord Cornwallis at Yorktown, Virginia in 1781.

== Family ==
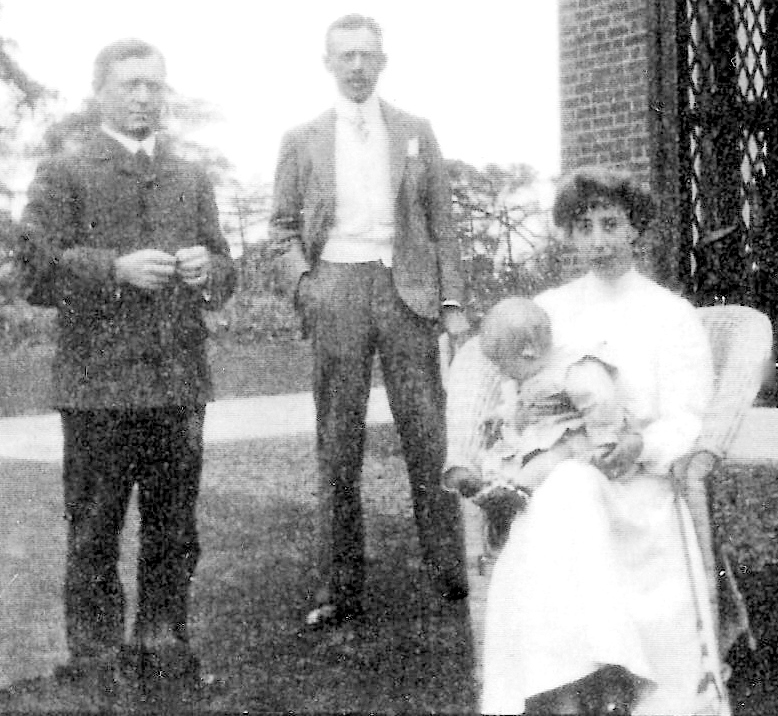
Frederick Russell Burnham, M. Howard Burnham, Connie Burnham, and baby Fred, c1904

Burnham was a descendant of Thomas Burnham (1617–1688) of Hartford, Connecticut, the first American ancestor of a large number of Burnhams. The descendants of Thomas Burnham have been noted in every American war, including the French and Indian War.

He had four children:

- Frederick Newton Burnham (Aug 25, 1904–1959), b. Lydenburg, Republic of South Africa (now the Territory of South Africa). d. Hastings, England.
- Thomas Chambers Burnham (May 14, 1906 – 2004), b. England; d. Key Largo, Florida.
- Mary Burnham (May 29, 1909 – 1987), b. England; d. London, England
- Katherine "Kitty" Burnham (October 9, 1911 – 1999), b. San Francisco, California; d. [Tormarton, Bath], England

== Bibliography ==
=== Works ===
- Burnham, M. H. (1901). "Continuous Section System Mine Sampling". Transactions of the Institution of Mining and Metallurgy. X: 204–218. ISSN 0371-7836.
- Burnham, M. H. (1904). "Treatment of Telluride Ores by Dry Crushing and Roasting at Kalgoorlie". Transactions of the Institution of Mining and Metallurgy. XIII: 59. ISSN 0371-7836.
- Burnham, M. H. (June 1911). "Financing a Mine". Mining Magazine: 445. ISSN 0308-6631.
- Burnham, M. Howard (1912). Modern Mine Valuation. London, C. Griffin and Company, limited. ISBN 1-151-74631-2.
- Bradford, Mary E; Richard H Bradford (1993). An American family on the African frontier: the Burnham family letters, 1893–1896. Niwot, Colorado: Roberts Rinehart. ISBN 1-879373-66-1. Some Burnham correspondence between 1893 and 1896.

=== Biographies ===
- Burnham, Frederick Russell (1944). Taking Chances. Haynes. ISBN 1-879356-32-5.. Chapter XXXI is on M. Howard Burnham.
