= 13th Georgia Infantry Regiment =

Infantry regiment of the Confederate States Army

- Georgia State flag prior to 1879
- Active: 1861–1865
- Country: Confederate States of America
- Allegiance: Georgia
- Branch: Confederate States Army
- Type: Infantry
- Engagements: American Civil War: Battle of Malvern Hill; Battle of Second Manassas; Battle of Antietam; Battle of Fredericksburg; Battle of Chancellorsville; Battle of Gettysburg; Battle of the Wilderness; Battle of Spotsylvania Court House; Battle of Appomattox Court House

Commanders
- Notable commanders: Colonel Marcellus Douglass; Colonel James M. Smith

The 13th Georgia Infantry Regiment was an infantry regiment in the Confederate States Army during the American Civil War.

== History ==
The 13th Georgia was organized on July 8, 1861, in Griffin, Georgia. Initially serving under Brigadier General John B. Floyd in what is today West Virginia, the unit participated in limited engagements before returning to Georgia due to poor conditions. In early 1862, it joined Lawton's Brigade and was stationed in Savannah, Georgia before being reorganized in May. The brigade, comprising the 13th, 26th, 31st, 38th, 60th, and 61st Georgia regiments, was formed in response to Governor Joseph E. Brown's call for coastal defense following the attack on Fort Sumter.

Under Brig. Gen. Alexander Lawton, the brigade became part of Robert E. Lee's Army of Northern Virginia and served from the Seven Days Battles through the surrender at Appomattox. In May 1862, the brigade was deployed to the Shenandoah Valley to support Stonewall Jackson, aiding a Confederate strategic deception during the Peninsula Campaign. Upon the death of Colonel Walton Ector early in 1862, Marcellus Douglass was appointed colonel. He was killed at the Battle of Antietam while leading his regiment and was succeeded by James M. Smith. John H. Baker, at that time major of the regiment, was promoted to lieutenant colonel and afterward was commissioned colonel.

The 13th Georgia participated in numerous significant battles, including Malvern Hill, Second Manassas, Antietam, Fredericksburg, Chancellorsville, Gettysburg, the Wilderness, Spotsylvania, Monocacy, and Cedar Creek. The regiment also saw action in lesser-known engagements such as skirmishes on the Georgia coast and the capture of a Union gunboat. It surrendered with the rest of the Army of Northern Virginia at Appomattox Court House on April 9, 1865.

The regiment was composed of ten companies, each drawn from various Georgia counties:

- Company A – Pike County (Confederate Guards)
- Company B – Meriwether and Troup Counties (Meriwether Volunteers)
- Company C – Catoosa County and the Ringgold community (Ringgold Rangers)
- Company D – Upson County (Upson Volunteers)
- Company E – Randolph and Terrell Counties (Randolph Volunteers)
- Company F – Fayette County (Fayette Rangers)
- Company G – Early County (Early Guards)
- Company H – Terrell County (Panola Rifles)
- Company I – Spalding County (Stark Volunteers)
- Company K – Troup County (Evans Guards)
