= Joseph K. Mansfield =

United States Army officer (1803–1862)

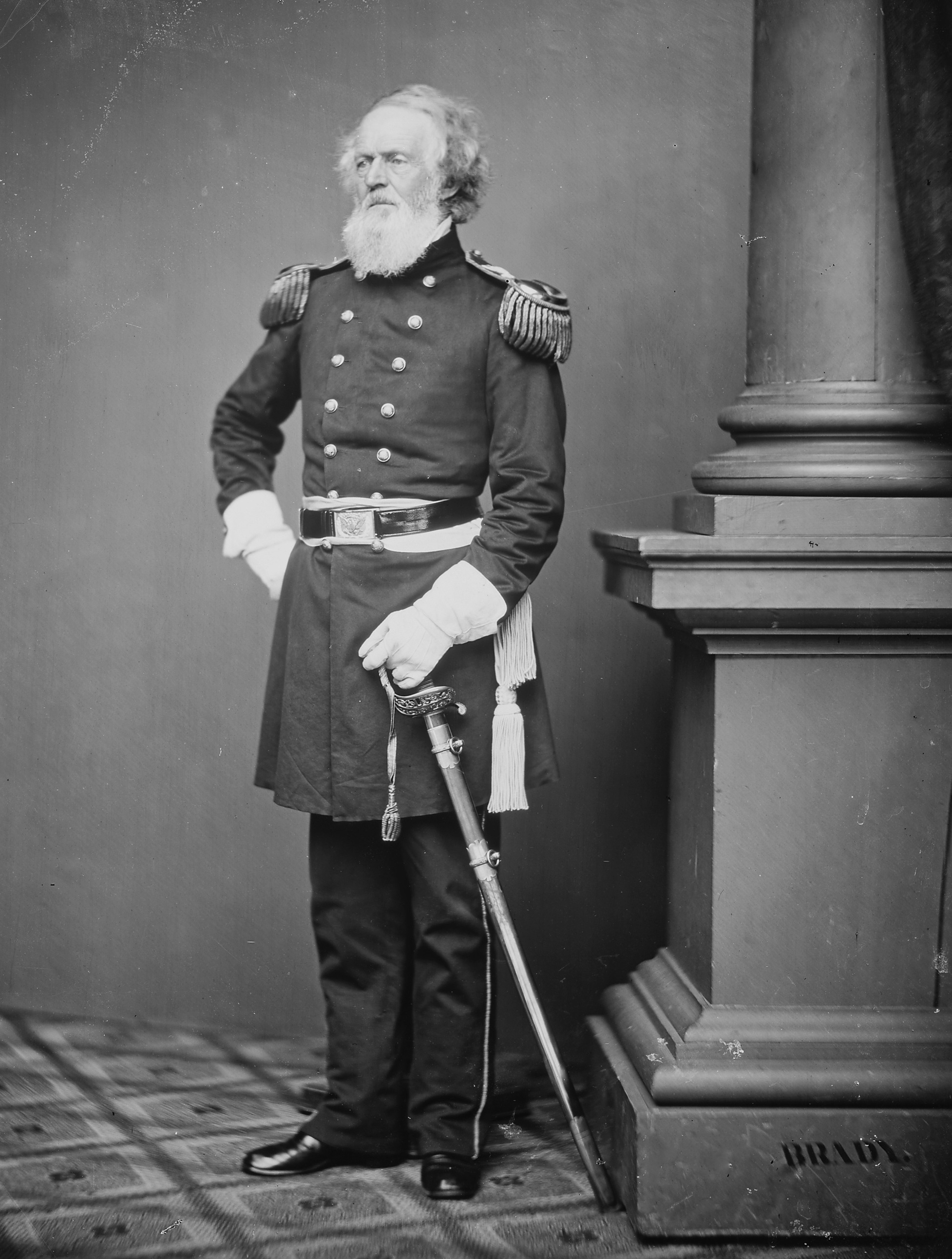
- Maj. Gen. Joseph K. Mansfield, photograph by Mathew Brady
- Born: December 22, 1803; New Haven, Connecticut, US
- Died: September 18, 1862 (aged 58); Sharpsburg, Maryland, US
- Children: Samuel M. Mansfield (son)
- Relatives: Howard M. Burnham (nephew); Joseph G. Totten (cousin)
- Military career
- Allegiance: United States
- Branch: United States Army; Union Army
- Service years: 1822–1862
- Rank: Major General
- Commands: Department of Washington; XII Corps
- Conflicts: Mexican–American War; Siege of Fort Texas; Battle of Monterrey; Battle of Buena Vista; American Civil War; Battle of Hampton Roads; Maryland campaign; Battle of Antietam (DOW)

Joseph King Fenno Mansfield (December 22, 1803 – September 18, 1862) was a career United States Army officer and civil engineer. He served as a Union general in the American Civil War and was fatally wounded at the Battle of Antietam.

== Early life ==
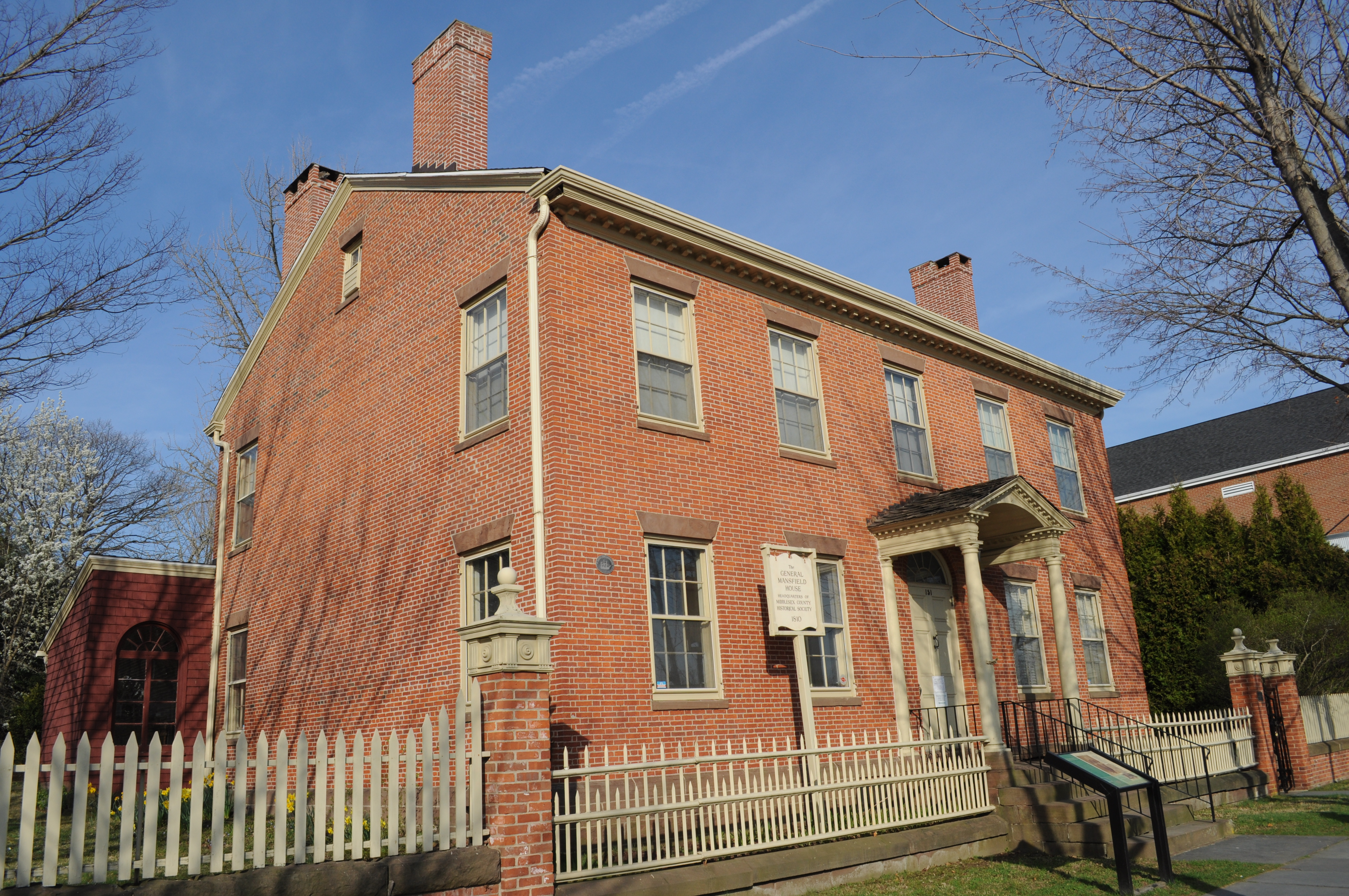
Mansfield's house in Middletown, Connecticut, built by his father-in-law in 1810. Now the home of the Middlesex County Historical Society.

Mansfield was born to Henry and Mary Fenno Mansfield in New Haven, Connecticut, a cousin of Joseph G. Totten. He entered the United States Military Academy when he was fourteen and graduated second in a class of forty in 1822. He then became a resident of Middletown, Connecticut, before and during his military career. He was commissioned a second lieutenant in the U.S. Army Corps of Engineers. Advancement came slowly in the peacetime army and he was promoted to first lieutenant in 1832 and captain in 1838. During the Mexican–American War, he received a brevet promotion to major for the action at Fort Brown, Texas, on May 9, 1846. He was wounded in the leg at the Battle of Monterrey, and he received a brevet promotion to lieutenant colonel for his actions there. He was appointed a brevet colonel for the Battle of Buena Vista in 1847. After the war he was promoted to colonel and Inspector General of the U.S. Army on May 28, 1853.

== Civil War ==
At the start of the Civil War, Mansfield commanded the Department of Washington (April 27 – August 17, 1861), and was promoted to brigadier general on May 6, 1861. General-in-chief Winfield Scott recommended Mansfield for command of the volunteer army being raised in Washington D.C. that spring, but the command went to Irvin McDowell instead. Mansfield was not considered the best choice due to his relatively advanced age and skepticism of volunteer troops and the administration's push for a quick drive on Richmond that would end the war in a few months, and he also lacked a political sponsor in Washington.

After the Union rout at Bull Run, George McClellan was put in command of the war effort in the Eastern Theater and Mansfield's hopes of army command were again dashed. McClellan also did not offer him a command in the newly created Army of the Potomac. Mansfield was stationed at Hatteras Inlet, North Carolina, in October, following the battle fought there by Benjamin Butler in August. He was a brigade commander in the Department of Virginia from March to June 1862. His only combat activity during this period was the firing of coastal batteries from Hampton Roads against the ironclad CSS Virginia in its naval battle against the USS Monitor on March 9, 1862. Until the fall of 1862, Mansfield commanded the Suffolk Division of the VII Corps of the Department of Virginia in the vicinity of Suffolk.

During the Maryland Campaign, when Confederate General Robert E. Lee invaded the North for the first time, Mansfield was given command of the XII Corps of the Army of the Potomac, as of September 15, 1862, two days prior to the Battle of Antietam. He arrived in the camp with 40 years of army experience, but no recent combat. He was white-haired and white-bearded, but had a vigorous manner that belied his age. His officers considered him nervous and fussy, but his men, many of whom were new recruits, liked him well enough due to his shows of blustery enthusiasm and fatherly assurance.

On the morning of September 17, 1862, the I Corps under Maj. Gen. Joseph Hooker attacked from the north, parallel to the Hagerstown Turnpike, smashing into the Confederate left flank. Mansfield's corps came immediately behind. As the lead brigade moved through an open field east of the Miller farmstead, they were subjected to fire by Confederate gunners, who took a terrible toll on the rookie soldiers. The troops were advancing in column formation, more suitable for marching, and their officers ordered deployment into open battle lines, which would reduce the risk of casualties from artillery shelling. Mansfield countermanded these orders, insisting they stay in column, because he was concerned that outside of the immediate control of their officers, the men would break and run. The result of this was to improve the mass of men that descended on the Confederate lines.

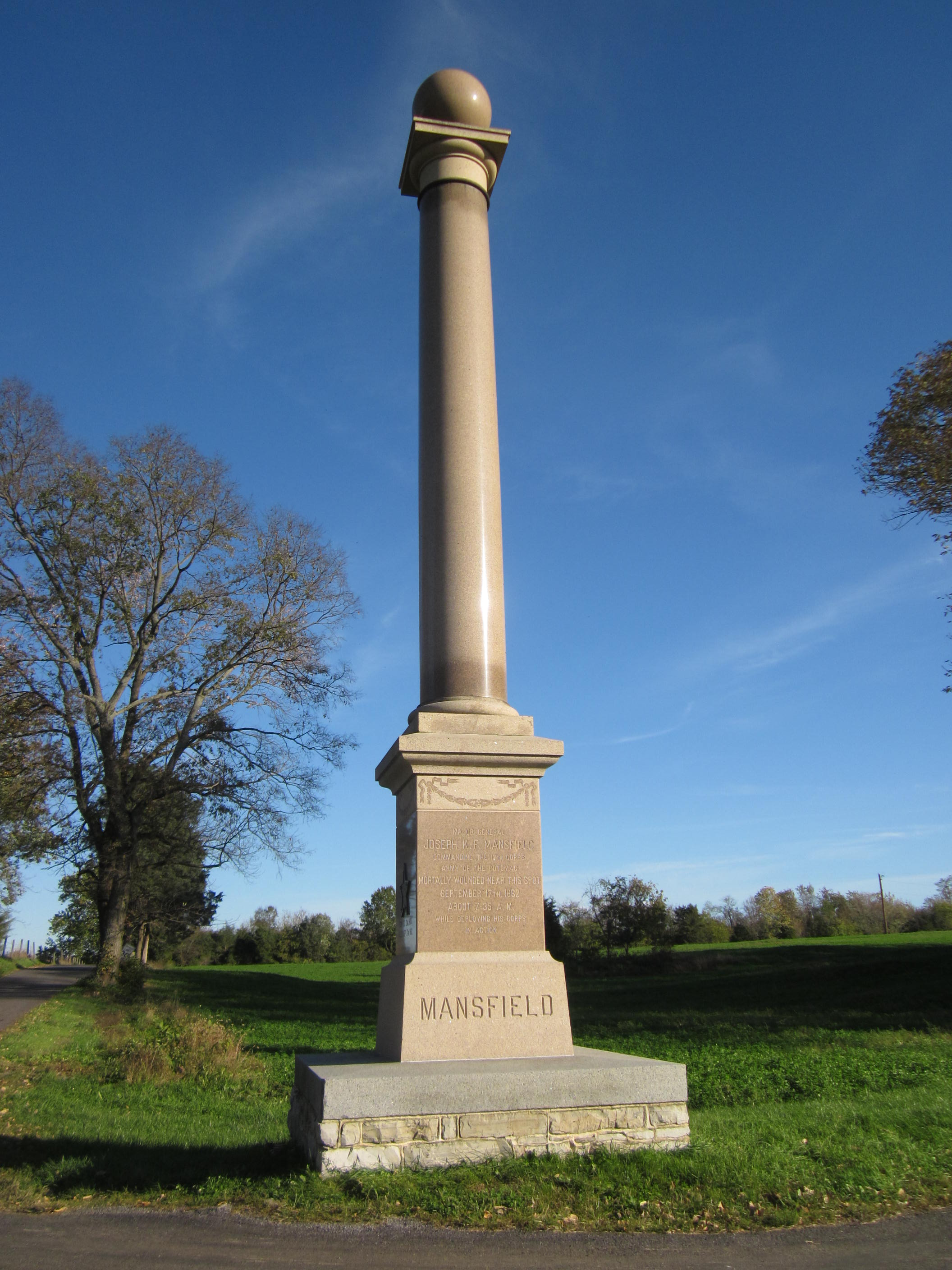
Monument to Joseph K. Mansfield, Antietam National Battlefield, Sharpsburg, MD, October 2011

Mansfield personally led troops on his left flank, from the brigade of Brig. Gen. Samuel W. Crawford, in the East Woods. He returned to the rear to bring up more troops, and when he reached the line again he saw soldiers from the 10th Maine Infantry regiment firing into the woods. Mansfield, assuming that men from Hooker's corps were in the woods, rode down the regimental line crying out, "You are firing on our own men!" The soldiers convinced Mansfield that in fact they were not and were receiving heavy fire from the woods. Mansfield replied, "Yes, yes, you are right," and just then his horse was hit and a bullet caught him squarely in the right chest. Writes Dr. Patrick Henry Flood, Surgeon, 107th NY Regiment, in a letter to his widow: "I found the clothing around his chest saturated with blood, and upon opening them, found he was wounded in the right breast, the ball penetrating about two inches from the nipple, and passing out the back, near the edge of the shoulder blade."

The general, tottering in his saddle, goaded the bleeding horse north along the Smoketown Road, away from the 10th Maine, until he came upon the right company of the 125th Pennsylvania. Captain Gardner (K Co.), who noticed that the general seemed ill, immediately called for some men to help the general dismount; Sergeant John Caho (K Co.) and Privates Sam Edmunson (K Co.) and E.S. Rudy (H Co.), with two stragglers, gently eased the bleeding officer from his horse. Forming a chair with their muskets, the five men picked up Mansfield and carried him to a lone tree in the rear of their line, where they left him to await the arrival of a surgeon.

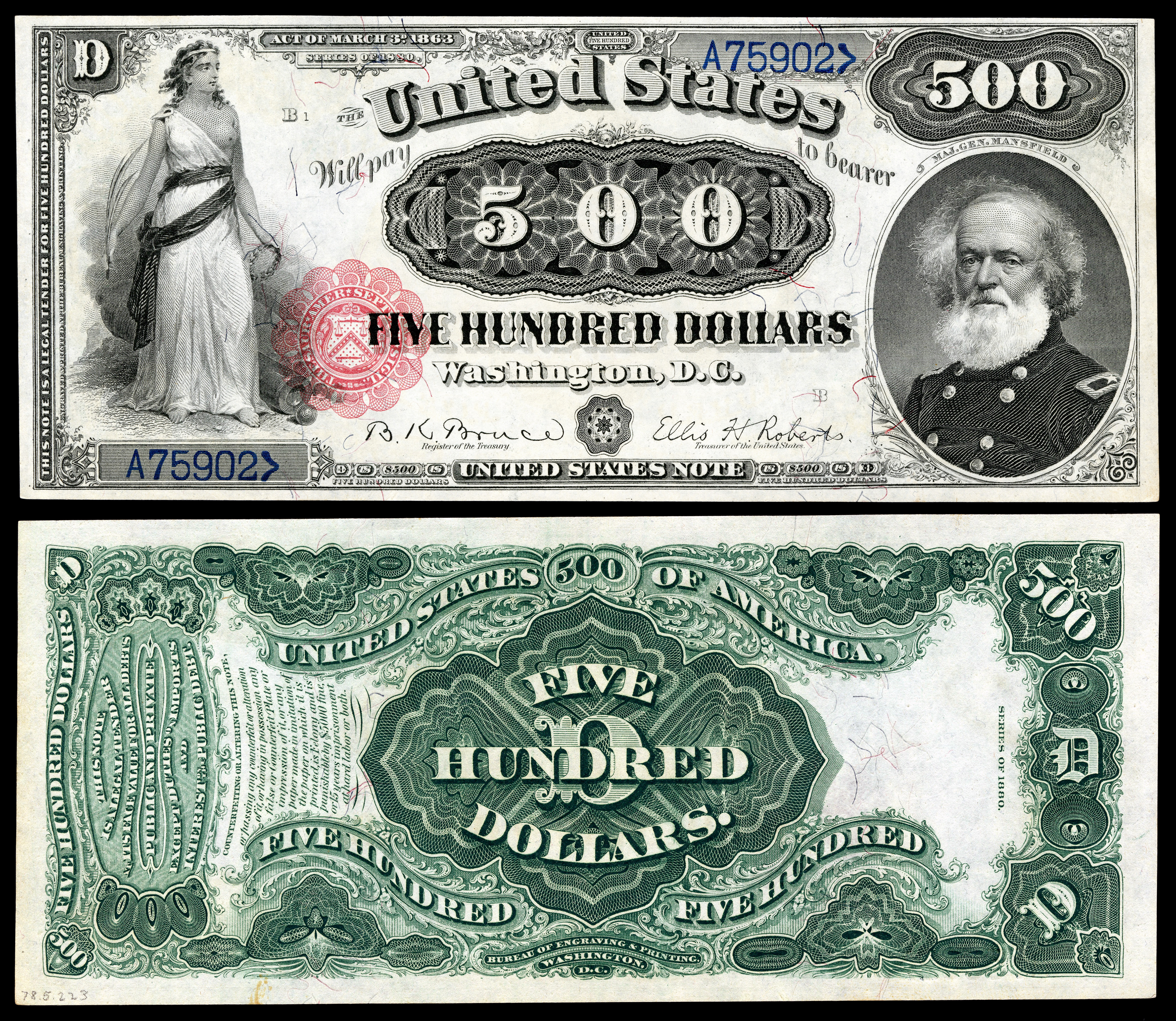
In 1880, the $500 United States Note featured a portrait of General Mansfield, killed in the Battle of Antietam of the American Civil War.

He was taken to a field hospital at the George Line farm in Sharpsburg, where he died the next morning. He was interred in Mortimer Cemetery and re-interred in Indian Hill Cemetery, Middletown, Connecticut, on May 30, 1867. He received a posthumous promotion to major general, backdated from July 18, 1862, for his gallantry at Antietam. Alpheus Williams became acting commander of the XII Corps after Mansfield's death.

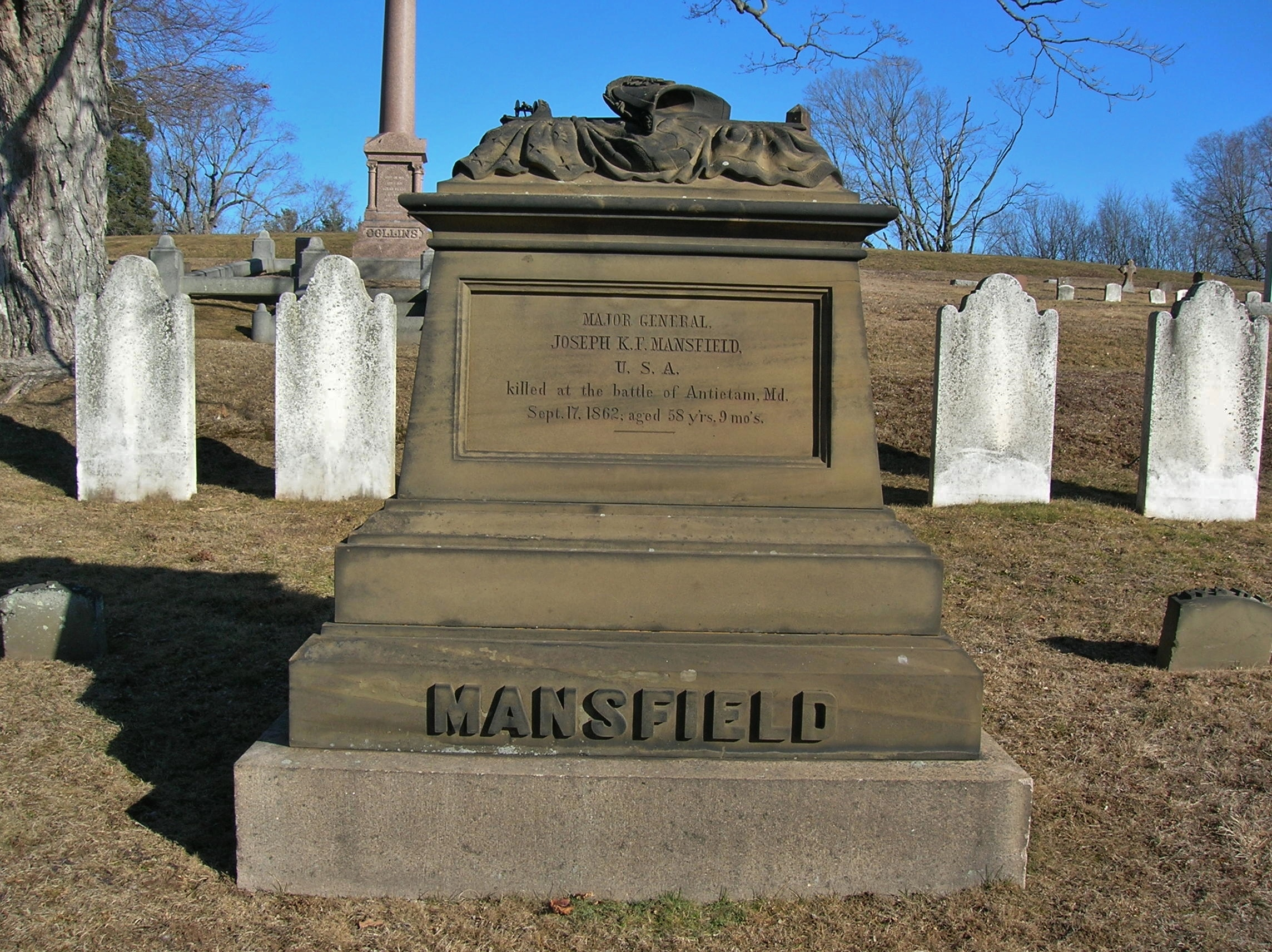
Gravestone monument for Joseph K. Mansfield, Indian Hill Cemetery, Middletown, CT, February 2016

Fort Mansfield, a coastal artillery installation in Westerly, Rhode Island, was named in his honor. Mansfield Avenue in the Antietam National Battlefield was also named for him, as was the Middletown Mansfields baseball team.

His nephew, Lt. Howard Mather Burnham of the 5th U.S. Light Artillery, Battery H, was killed in action in 1863 at the Battle of Chickamauga.

== See also ==
- List of American Civil War generals (Union)
- List of people on United States banknotes

== Notes ==
Military offices
Preceded by Alpheus S. Williams	Commander of the XII Corps (Army of the Potomac); September 15–17, 1862	Succeeded by Alpheus S. Williams
