= Marcellus Douglass =

Confederate army officer

- Born: October 5, 1830; Thomaston, Georgia, U.S.
- Died: September 17, 1862 (aged 31); Sharpsburg, Maryland
- Education: University of Georgia
- Military career
- Allegiance: Confederate States of America
- Branch: Confederate States Army
- Service years: 1861-1862
- Rank: Colonel
- Unit: 13th Georgia Infantry Regiment
- Conflicts: American Civil War: Maryland Campaign; Battle of Antietam†

Colonel Marcellus Douglass (1830–1862) was a Confederate Army officer and commander of the 13th Georgia Infantry Regiment during the American Civil War.

== Biography ==
Douglass was born in Thomaston, Georgia, October 5, 1830. After graduation from the University of Georgia, he practiced law in Cuthbert, Georgia. On June 19, 1861, he was commissioned captain of Company E, 13th Georgia. He was promoted to Lt. Colonel July 8, 1861, and to full Colonel February 1, 1862. Douglass was killed at the battle of Antietam while commanding Lawton's brigade south of the section of the battle known as the Cornfield on September 17, 1862. Douglass was struck eight times before dying of his wounds commanding his men. He is buried in Rosedale Cemetery, Cuthbert.
