= Miller's Cornfield =

Battlefield site near Antietam, Maryland

- Part of Battle of Antietam
- Sharpsburg, Maryland
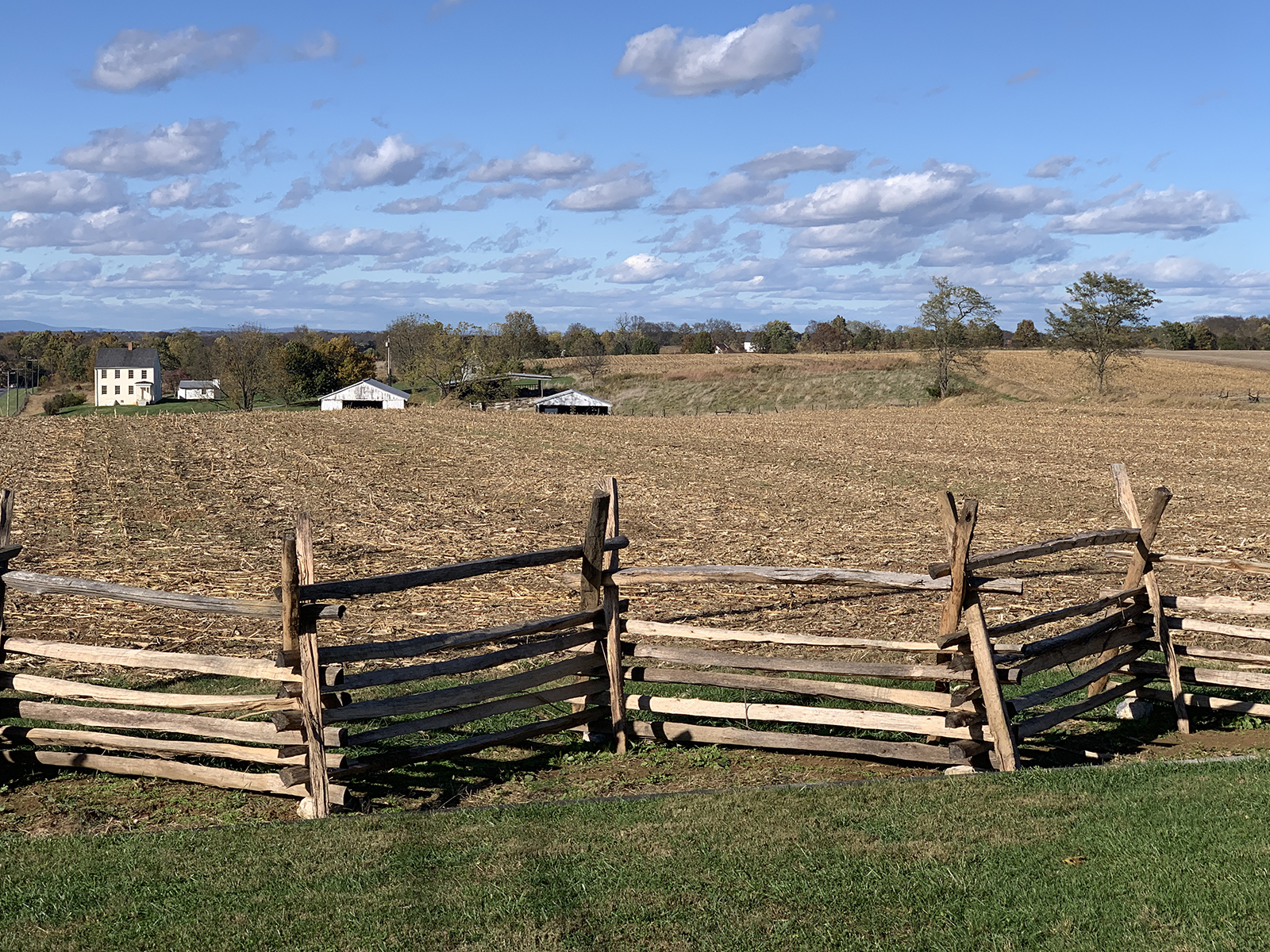
- Looking north into the Cornfield

Site information
- Owner: Private and public land
- Controlled by: United States National Park Service (part)
- Condition: Preserved and commemorated

Location
- Coordinates: 39°28′24″N 77°44′41″W

Site history
- Built: Early 19th century (as farmland)
- In use: Site of major battle on September 17, 1862
- Materials: Farmland, cornfields, fences
- Battles/wars: Battle of Antietam
- Events: First major battle fought on Union soil during the American Civil War

Miller's Cornfield is a historic American Civil War battlefield site near Sharpsburg, Maryland, notable for its pivotal and fiercely contested fighting during the Battle of Antietam on September 17, 1862, one of the most significant battles of the Civil War and the deadliest single day in U.S. history. The cornfield was the scene of some of the bloodiest combat of the battle, involving repeated attacks and counterattacks between Union and Confederate forces.

== Description ==
Miller's Cornfield was a prominent agricultural feature on the farm of David R. Miller, located approximately half a mile north of Sharpsburg, Maryland, in September 1862. The Miller farm was a well-developed property that included cultivated fields, pastureland, and multiple outbuildings. The farmhouse, a modest two-story whitewashed structure, stood on the eastern side of the Hagerstown Pike, accompanied by a detached kitchen, a former blacksmith shop, and a springhouse supplying fresh water. A large barn sat across the road, flanked by hay and straw stacks gathered earlier in the season. To the rear of the house lay a family orchard and vegetable garden, while additional woodlots provided fuel and fencing materials. The cornfield itself was centrally located on the eastern portion of the farm, surrounded by pastures and bordered by adjacent properties, including that of the Mumma family to the south. Situated along the east side of the Pike, the cornfield covered about 24 acres and stood on gently rolling ground partly elevated on a small hill. That year, the field was planted in corn that by early September had grown tall and lush, bearing thousands of nearly ripened ears in anticipation of the autumn harvest.

The intense combat in Miller's Cornfield was marked by confusion and brutal close-quarters fighting. Visibility was limited due to the height of the corn, and control of the field changed hands multiple times throughout the morning of September 17.

== History ==
=== Pre-battle ===
The Miller farm was established in the early 1800s by the Miller family, who cultivated the land for corn and other crops. The property remained in family hands at the time of the battle. Prior to the Battle of Antietam, Miller's Cornfield was typical agricultural land for Washington County, Maryland. Its fields provided natural cover and obstacles that influenced troop movements during the engagement. It extended eastward from the turnpike to the edge of another woodlot, now known as the East Woods. There were several other cornfields in the area where soldiers would fight during the battle, but only Miller's 30 acres became known as "the Cornfield."

=== Hooker's First Corps Advances ===
Map of the Battle of Antietam around the Cornfield

In the early morning hours of September 17, Major General Joseph Hooker's First Corps crossed Antietam Creek, moving south toward the Hagerstown Turnpike and pressing the Confederate defenders of Maj. Gen. Thomas J. "Stonewall" Jackson's and Maj. Gen. Richard S. Ewell's divisions. Around 6 a.m., the first Union brigade entered the Cornfield, that of Brigadier General Abram Duryée, consisting of three regiments of New Yorkers and one of Pennsylvanians. The corn stood 7 to 8 feet (2.1 to 2.4 m) tall, severely restricting visibility and making command and control nearly impossible once troops entered the field. Planted in narrow rows about 2 feet (0.61 m) apart, the corn followed a checkerboard pattern typical of the era, with small mounds around each stalk that funneled movement along the rows. As a result, Duryee's troops were forced to advance straight down the rows, which fortunately aligned north to south, the direction of their movement, though the dense vegetation and irregular ground still made maintaining formation and cohesion extremely difficult.

Once they emerged from the Cornfield, they encountered withering fire from Georgians belonging to Brig. Gen. Alexander Lawton. The Union and Confederate troops stood around 250 yards (230 m) apart, with little to no cover, exchanging volleys. Eventually, when the brigades of Colonel William H. Christian and Brig. Gen. George Lucas Hartsuff failed to reinforce him, Duryée withdrew his brigade back through the Cornfield. In almost half an hour, around a third of the men in the brigade were killed or wounded, and the brigade would not take part in any further action during the battle.

Confederate casualties were also very high, leading Lawton to deploy the brigade of Brig. Gen. Harry T. Hays, popularly known as the Louisiana Tigers, a diverse unit including Irishmen and French Creoles. As they charged toward the Cornfield, they suffered devastating Union artillery fire before encountering elements of Hartsuff's brigade under Col. Richard Coulter, who had assumed command after Hartsuff was wounded. Lawton's Georgians and Louisianans drove the Union troops out of the Cornfield, but quickly found themselves suppressed by fire from the corn in their front and the woods to the east. They managed to escape south to safety, but not before Col. Marcellus Douglass, commanding Lawton's first brigade, was killed. Every regimental commander belonging to the Louisiana Tigers was killed or wounded, while the entire brigade suffered a casualty rate of around 61 percent.

The Iron Brigade under Brig. Gen. John Gibbon next entered the Cornfield under intermittent fire from Confederate skirmishers of the 21st Virginia Infantry Regiment. The 6th Wisconsin Infantry Regiment became divided as Major Rufus Dawes led several companies slowly through the dense corn on the left, while Colonel Edward S. Bragg guided the remaining companies more quickly along the open ground west of the Hagerstown Pike. The difference in terrain caused the regiment to split into two disconnected wings, with visibility and coordination hampered by the tall crops and uneven ground. As Bragg's wing reached a rise near the southern edge of the Cornfield, it was struck by a sudden volley from Confederate brigades hidden in the woods to the west. Unable to hold their exposed position along the road, Bragg ordered a retreat to a nearby post-and-rail fence at the Cornfield's edge, where the men reformed under cover.

The Iron Brigade was soon supported by the 84th New York Volunteer Infantry, also known as the 14th Brooklyn. The "red-legged devils" were rivals of their Iron Brigade allies, as the 14th Brooklyn belonged to the Eastern Iron Brigade, having earned that nickname before Gibbon's men received it. Lawton's Georgians had begun to retreat when they were reinforced by more Louisianans under Brig. Gen. William E. Starke. Like the Tigers, they too managed to halt the Union advance, but at the cost of heavy casualties, including Starke.

=== Hood's Counterattack and Withdrawal ===
At about 7 a.m., Confederate reinforcements under Brig. Gen. John Bell Hood's division came to relieve Lawton's men, enraged that the battle had interrupted their baking of hoecakes in their bivouac beyond the West Woods, their first rations in three days. Furious and hungry, the hardened veterans of the division let out a rebel yell and pushed into the corn and formed a line from the Hagerstown turnpike to the East Woods. In response, Hooker sent two brigades of the Pennsylvania Reserves under Brig. Gen. George Meade to support the two Iron Brigades. The 1st Texas Infantry Regiment pursued retreating Union troops to the northern edge of the Cornfield, moving far ahead of their allies. With their rifles propped on the lower rails of a fence, a Pennsylvanian brigade waited until the Texans came through the curtain of smoke before firing a volley directly at them. Alone and surrounded by Federal musketry and shells, four of every five men in the 1st Texas were killed or wounded in around twenty minutes, with two entire companies annihilated. When asked where his division was, Hood said, "Dead in the field." In his seven regiments of around 2,300 men that fought in the Cornfield, around 60 percent were killed or wounded. Hooker's corps also suffered around 2,600 casualties, about a third of those sent into action.

The 1st Texas' spontaneous assault through the cornfield left the regiment unsupported and exposed, resulting in heavy casualties and the collapse of Hood's center. The attack, lacking coordination and strategic purpose, exemplified the broader issues plaguing Hood's assault, most notably, the failure to maintain command structure and anticipate Union reinforcements. Although Hood's division temporarily bolstered the Confederate line, his decision to press beyond initial defensive gains led to a costly and unsustainable counteroffensive. The breakdown in leadership, extending from regimental officers to Hood and ultimately to General Stonewall Jackson, contributed to the Confederate failure to hold ground in the Cornfield, with the 1st Texas suffering the highest casualty percentage of any regiment in the Civil War.

=== Mansfield's Twelfth Corps Counterattack ===
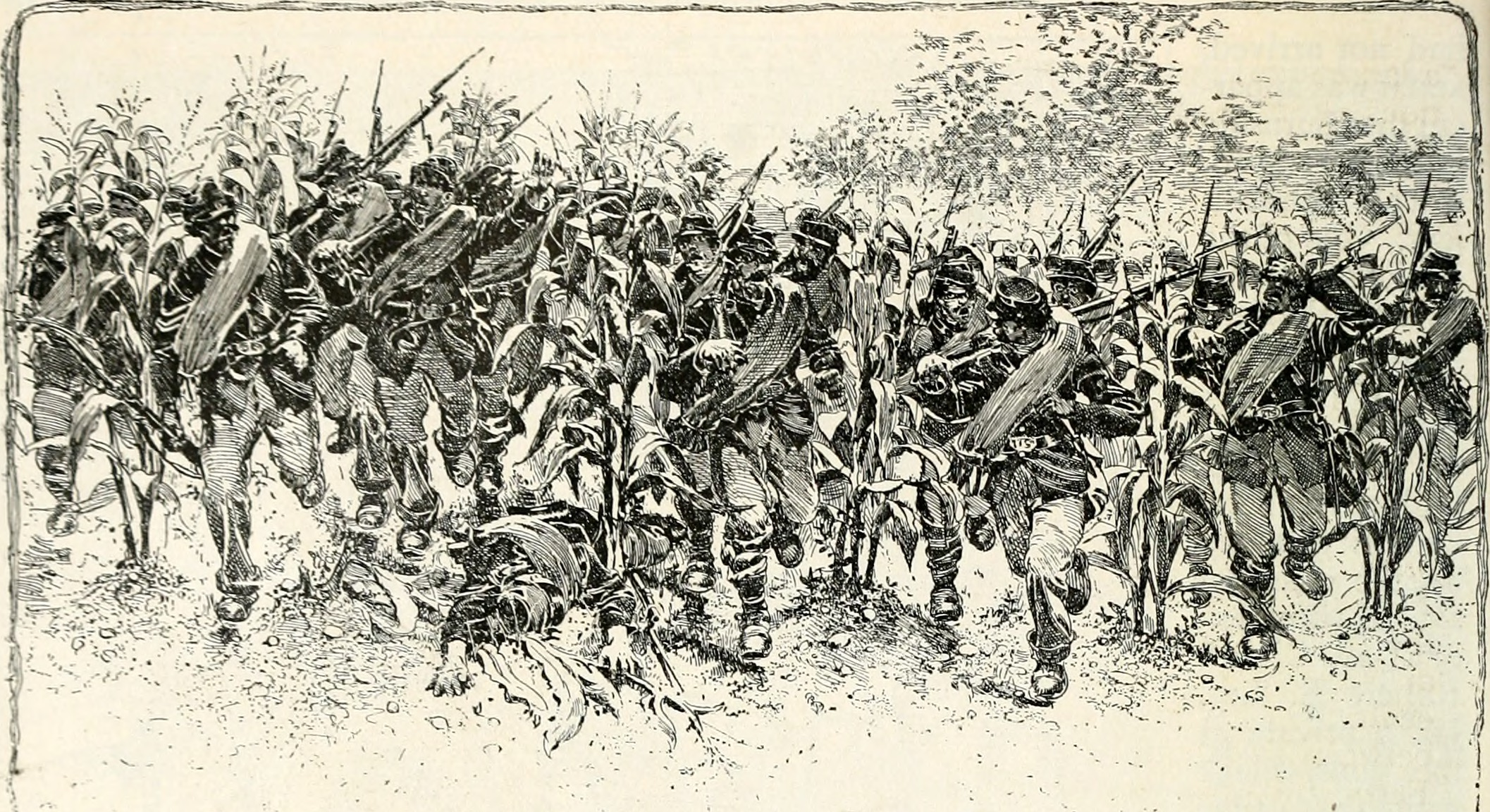
An artist's depiction of Union troops charging through the Cornfield

Maj. Gen. Joseph K. Mansfield's Twelfth Corps arrived from the northeast around 8 a.m. to help Hooker's severely depleted troops, although of the 7,200 men in the corps, only around half having previously experienced combat, with Mansfield only appointed corps commander two days before. While the sight of large, fresh regiments big enough to be brigades managed to break some of Hood's surviving soldiers, Mansfield insisted on his brigades staying in column rather than switching to line formation, which made them very susceptible to Rebel batteries. Mansfield was soon shot while mounted and died the following day. Leaderless, his corps fought on as much as they could, but could not break the stalemate. Brig. Gen. Alpheus S. Williams took over for Mansfield while the brigade of Brig. Gen. George Henry Gordon clashed with yet more Rebel reinforcements, this time Brig. Gen. Roswell S. Ripley's brigade from Maj. Gen. Daniel H. Hill's division. Many of Ripley's soldiers carried smoothbore muskets that fired buck and ball, cartridges that carried a standard musket ball along with three buckshot. In such close proximity, the smoothbore fire was akin to shotgun loads. Ripley's brigade was reinforced by the brigades of Col. Alfred H. Colquitt and Col. Duncan K. McRae and, again, the Cornfield turned into a bloody stalemate.

This changed with the arrival of another Union division from Twelfth Corps, that belonging to Brig. Gen. George S. Greene, a descendant of American Revolutionary War hero Nathanael Greene. Greene flanked the Confederates in the Cornfield on their right, sending Colquitt's and McRae's troops running in disorder for the rear. Greene's Ohioans and Pennsylvanians pushed hard, emptying the Cornfield as well as the East Woods of any Confederate soldiers still hanging on. To reinforce the area beyond the Dunker Church, General Robert E. Lee recalled Hood's exhausted division from the rear, despite the heavy losses it had sustained earlier in the Cornfield. Hood's men moved forward once again to secure the western edge of the West Woods. Union control of the ground between the East and West Woods, secured through their success in the Cornfield, once again proved strategically decisive. This position provided Greene's division with a stable base from which to launch its attack on the West Woods and allowed reinforcements to be brought forward quickly to support any advances. When Greene's men were driven back, the same ground offered crucial depth that protected the retreating division during its most vulnerable moment. It also helped absorb and weaken Longstreet's only counterattack by drawing Confederate forces deep into territory they were unable to support effectively. The continued Union hold on the Cornfield and its surrounding area remained a significant advantage.

By 9 a.m., the Cornfield and the rest of the battlefield east of the Hagerstown turnpike belonged to the Union. As Hooker rode south of the Cornfield on his white charger, he too was wounded, shot through the foot by a Confederate marksman.

== Preservation ==
Today, Miller's Cornfield is preserved as part of the Antietam National Battlefield managed by the United States National Park Service. Visitors must stay on the trail in this active agricultural area, which contains groundhog holes and poison ivy. The Cornfield is not always planted with corn, and the National Park Service issues permits to local farmers to grow crops and pasture animals to maintain the rural appearance of the landscape.
