= 5th U.S. Artillery, Battery H =

Battery H, 5th U.S. Artillery
- Active: July 1861 to February 1901
- Country: United States
- Allegiance: Union
- Branch: Artillery
- Equipment: 4 Napoleons; 2 10pdr Parrott rifles
- Engagements: American Civil War: Battle of Shiloh; Siege of Corinth; Battle of Stones River; Tullahoma Campaign; Battle of Chickamauga; Siege of Chattanooga; Pullman Strike of 1894

Battery H, 5th U.S. Artillery was United States Regular Army artillery company that served in the Union Army during the American Civil War.

Formed as part of the newly created 5th Regiment, United States Artillery in July 1861, it continued in regular service until the regiment was dissolved and reformed in February 1901.

== Service ==
The battery was attached to Artillery, 1st Division, Army of the Ohio, to May 1862. Artillery, 4th Division, Army of the Ohio, to September 1862. Artillery, 10th Brigade, 4th Division, II Corps, Army of the Ohio, to November 1862. Artillery, 2nd Division, Left Wing, XIV Corps, Army of the Cumberland, to January 1863. Artillery, 2nd Division, XXI Corps, Army of the Cumberland, to October 1863. Artillery, 1st Division, IV Corps, to March 1864. 1st Division, Artillery Reserve, Department of the Cumberland, to November 1864. Garrison Artillery, Nashville, Tennessee, Department of the Cumberland, to April 1865.

== American Civil War service ==
Moved to Louisville, Kentucky, November 1861, then to Munfordville, Ky., and duty there until February 1862. Advanced on Nashville, Tennessee, February 14–25, 1862. Marched to Savannah, Tennessee to reinforce the Army of the Tennessee March 20-April 8. Engaged at Shiloh, Tenn., April 7, 1862. Advance on and siege of Corinth, Mississippi, April 29-May 30. Buell's Campaign in northern Alabama and middle Tennessee June to August. Marched to Louisville, Ky., in pursuit of Bragg August 21-September 26. Pursuit of Bragg into Kentucky October 1–16. Lawrenceburg, Ky., October 8. Dog Walk October 9. March to Nashville, Tenn., October 16-November 7, and duty there until December 26. Kimbrough's Mills, Mill Creek, December 6. Advance on Murfreesboro, Tenn., December 26–30. Battle of Stones River December 30–31, 1862 and January 1–3, 1863. Duty at Murfreesboro until June. Tullahoma Campaign June 23-July 7. Hoover's Gap June 24–26. Occupation of middle Tennessee until August 16. Passage of Cumberland Mountains and Tennessee River and Chickamauga Campaign August 16-September 22. Battle of Chickamauga, September 19–20. Siege of Chattanooga September 24-November 23. Chattanooga-Ringgold Campaign November 23–27. At Chattanooga until March 25, 1864, and at Nashville, Tenn., until August 31. Pulaski September 27. Moved to Tullahoma September 29. Operations against Wheeler October. Moved to Nashville, Tenn., October 31, and duty there until April 1865. Moved to Fort Richmond, New York, April 1865.

== Commanders ==
- Captain William R. Terrill - promoted to brigadier general (USV), September 9, 1862
- Captain George A. Kensel
  - Lieutenant Howard M. Burnham - acting commander, killed in action at the Battle of Chickamauga on September 19, 1863
- Captain Francis L. Guenther
- Captain Joshua A. Fessenden
- Captain Henry J. Reilly
- Captain Elbridge R. Hills
- Captain George W. Crabb
- Captain Thomas R. Adams
- Captain Luigi Lomia

== See also ==
- List of United States Regular Army Civil War units
- Field Artillery Branch (United States)
