= Antietam National Battlefield =

Historical area from the American Civil War

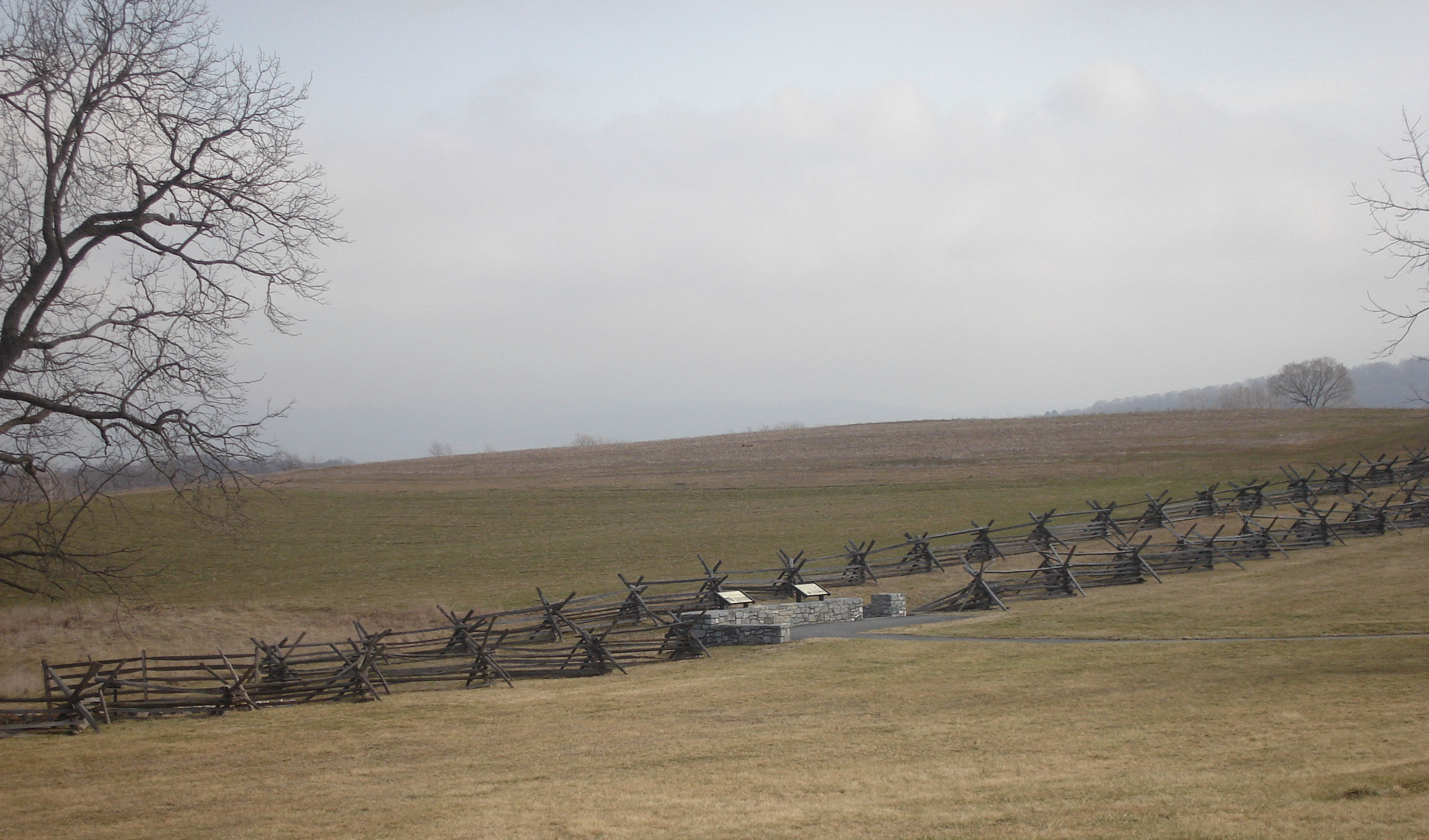
- Bloody Lane at Antietam

- Location within Maryland Location within the United States
- Location: Washington County, Maryland, U.S.
- Nearest city: Sharpsburg, MD
- Coordinates: 39°28′13″N 77°44′17″W
- Area: 3,229 acres (13.07 km^{2})
- Established: August 30, 1890
- Visitors: 161,006 (in 2025)
- Governing body: National Park Service
- Website: Antietam National Battlefield
- Antietam National Battlefield
- U.S. National Register of Historic Places
- U.S. Historic district
- Location: N of Sharpsburg off MD 45, Sharpsburg, Maryland
- Built: 1862
- NRHP reference No.: 66000038
- Added to NRHP: October 15, 1966

Antietam National Battlefield is a National Park Service-protected area along Antietam Creek in Sharpsburg, Washington County, northwestern Maryland. It commemorates the American Civil War Battle of Antietam that occurred on September 17, 1862.

The area, situated on fields among the Appalachian foothills near the Potomac River, features the battlefield site and visitor center, a national military cemetery, stone arch Burnside's Bridge, and a field hospital museum.

== Features ==
In the Battle of Antietam, General Robert E. Lee's first invasion of the North ended on this battlefield in 1862. Established as Antietam National Battlefield Site August 30, 1890, the park was transferred from the War Department on August 10, 1933, and redesignated November 10, 1978. Along with all historic areas administered by the National Park Service, the battlefield was listed on the National Register of Historic Places on October 15, 1966. Additional documentation on the site was recorded by the National Park Service on February 27, 2009.

=== Cemetery ===
Antietam National Cemetery, which adjoins the park, covers 11.36 acres (4.60 ha) and contains more than 4,976 interments (1,836 unidentified). The cemetery was commissioned in 1865, and interments began in 1867, following an arduous process of identifying the remains, which was only successful in about 40% of the cases. Civil War era burials in this cemetery consist of only Union soldiers; Confederate dead were interred in the Washington Confederate Cemetery in Hagerstown, Maryland; Mt. Olivet Cemetery, in Frederick, Maryland; and Elmwood Cemetery in Shepherdstown, West Virginia. The cemetery also contains the graves of veterans and their wives from the Spanish–American War, both World Wars, and the Korean War. The cemetery was closed to additional interments in 1953. However, two exceptions have been made; the first in 1978 for Congressman Goodloe Byron and the second in 2000 for the remains of USN Fireman Patrick Howard Roy who was killed in the attack on the USS Cole. The cemetery was placed under the War Department on July 14, 1870; it was transferred to the National Park Service on August 10, 1933. The gatehouse at the cemetery entrance was the first building designed by Paul J. Pelz, later architect of the Library of Congress.

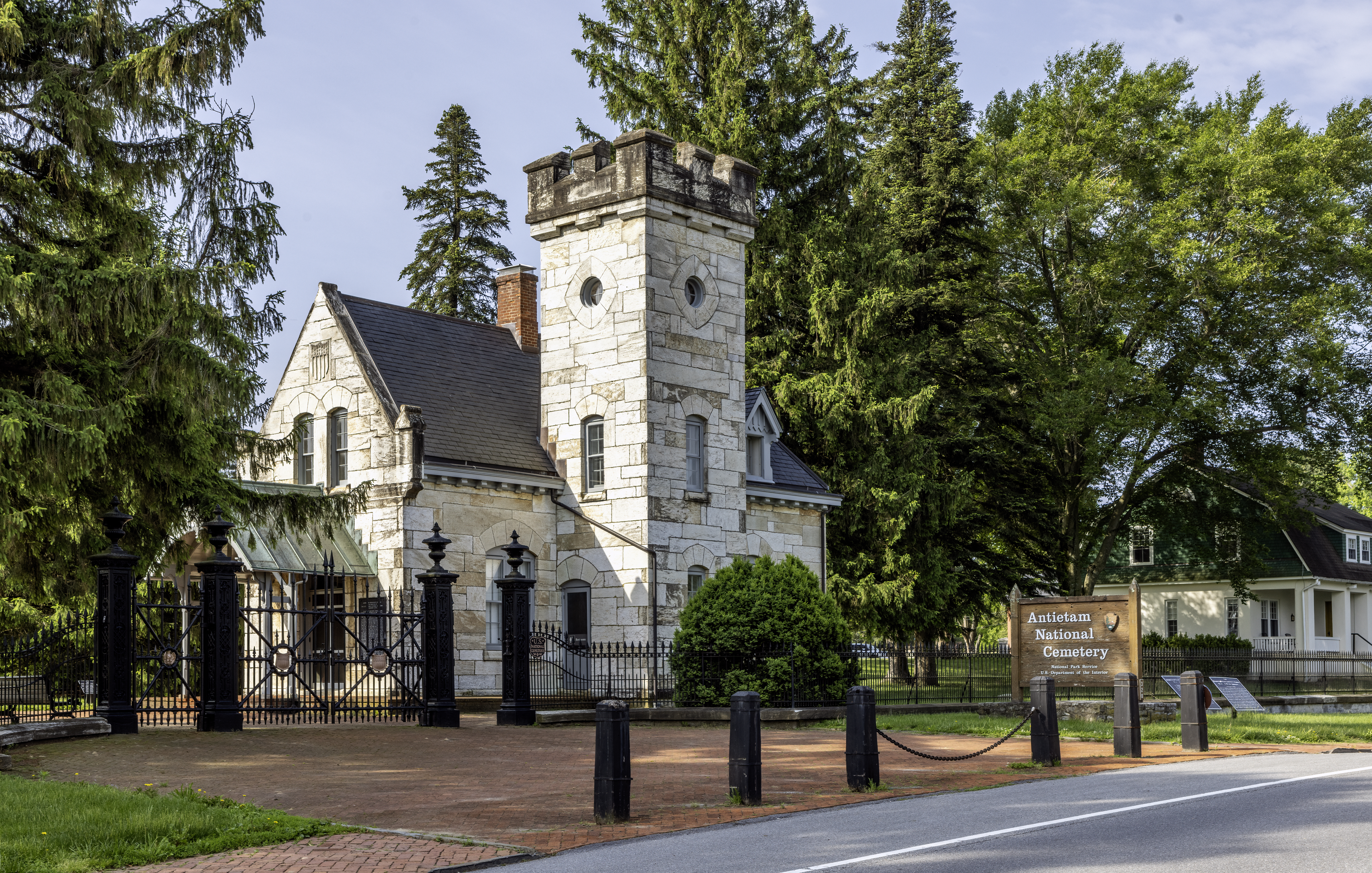
Antietam National Cemetery entrance and gatehouse

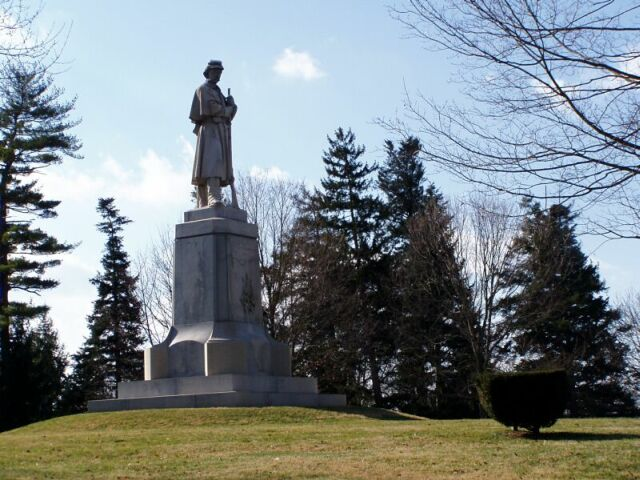
U.S. Soldier Monument ("Old Simon"), Carl Conrads, sculptor, George Keller architect, dedicated September 17, 1880.

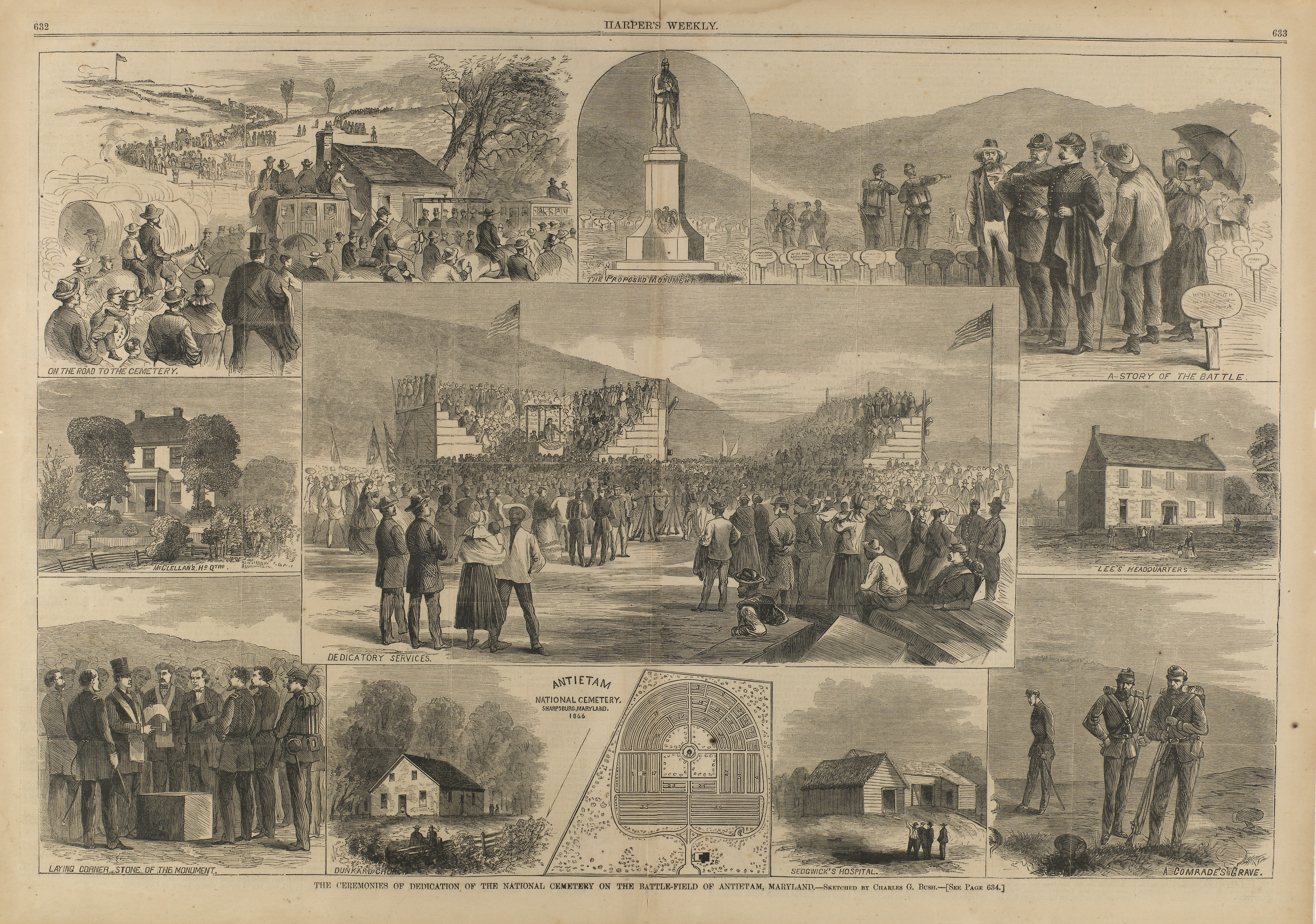
Ceremonies of dedication of the National Cemetery on the Battlefield of Antietam, MD, from Harper's Weekly, October 5, 1867

=== Visitor Center ===
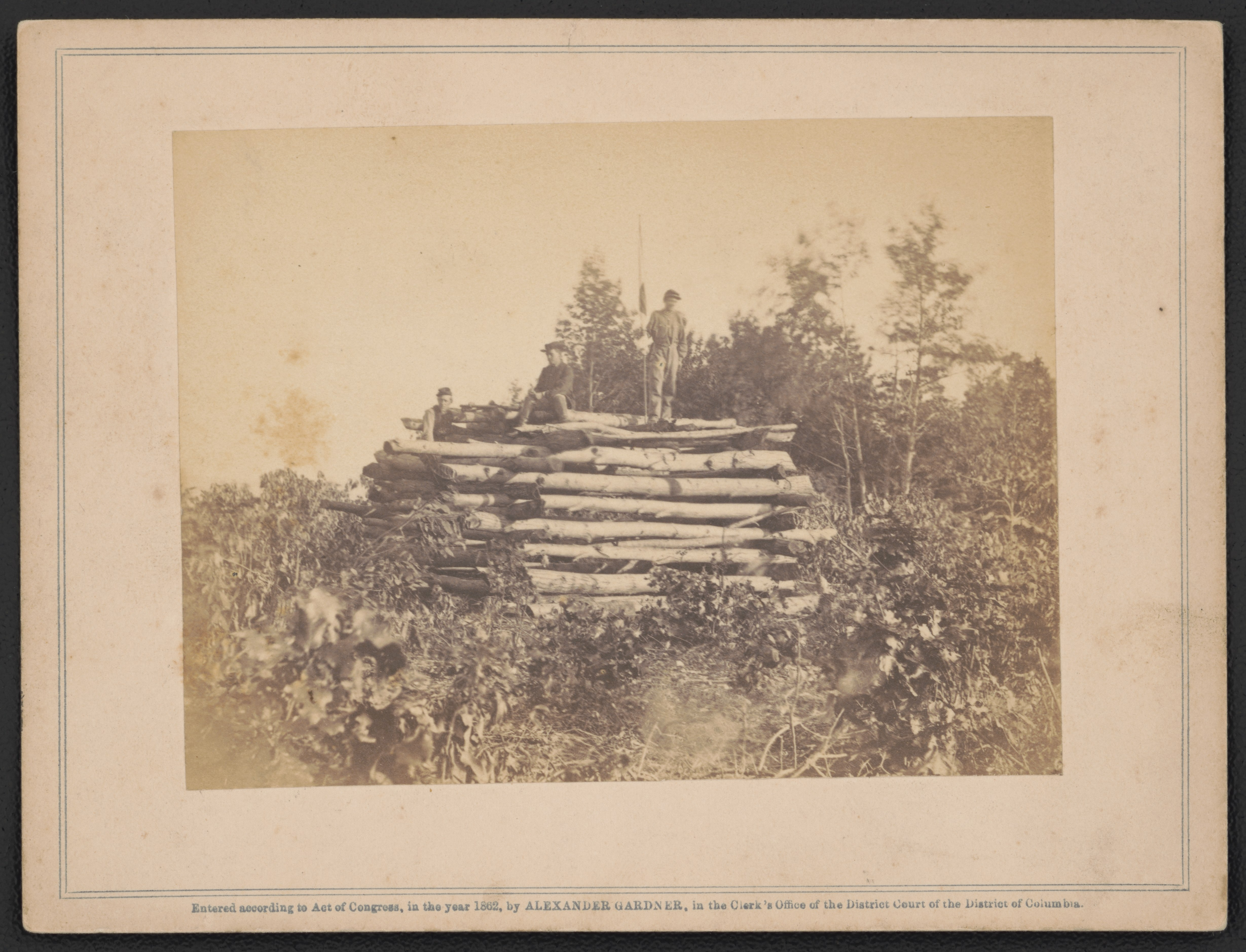
Signal tower, on Elk Mountain, overlooking the battlefield of Antietam. From the Liljenquist Family Collection of Civil War Photographs, Prints and Photographs Division, Library of Congress

The Antietam National Battlefield Visitor Center contains museum exhibits about the battle and the Civil War. The Visitor Center was constructed in 1962 as part of the Mission 66 plan. A 26-minute orientation film is shown on the hour and the half-hour. The visitor center is open seven days a week from 9:00 a.m. to 5:00 p.m., except on Thanksgiving, Christmas, and New Year's Day. Park rangers offer interpretive talks and an audio tour is available for purchase to accompany the self-guided 8.5-mile (13.7 km) driving tour of the battlefield with eleven stops. Park Grounds are open daylight hours. There is a park entrance fee of $10.00 per person (age 17 or older; 16 and under FREE) or $20.00 per vehicle. The entrance fee is valid for three days.

=== Pry House Field Hospital Museum ===
The Pry House Field Hospital Museum is located in the house that served as Union Commander General George B. McClellan's headquarters during the battle. Exhibits focus on period medical care of the wounded, as well as information about the Pry House. The museum is sponsored by the National Museum of Civil War Medicine.

=== Antietam Battlefield Illumination ===
This memorial illumination was started in 1989 and continues to this day on the first Saturday in December. Every year, over a thousand volunteers place 23,000 luminarias in rows on the northern portion of the battlefield. The luminaries consist of a paper bag filled with sand and a candle, and represents a soldier that was killed, injured, or went missing during the Battle of Antietam.

== Additional battlefield preservation ==
The Antietam National Battlefield was listed as one of America's Most Endangered Places in the years 1988, 1989, 1990, 1991, according to the National Trust for Historic Preservation. The Battlefield was added to the list in response to a "...flawed proposal to construct a shopping center and other buildings on battlefield land, the listing helped to galvanize support and action by local, state and federal agencies and non-profit organizations." By 2017, the Antietam National Battlefield was deemed a success story and was included alongside ten other sites that previously named to the Most Endangered and also became the focus of successful preservation efforts.

The American Battlefield Trust and its federal, state, and local partners, including the Save Historic Antietam Foundation, have acquired and preserved 468 acres (1.89 km^{2}) of the overall battlefield through mid-2023, including the "epicenter" tract, a 44.4-acre, previously privately owned parcel in the heart of the battlefield park between Miller's Cornfield and the Dunker Church. The land, also known as the Wilson farm, was purchased by the Trust in 2015 for about $1 million. The preservation organization has since removed the postwar house and barn that stood on the property along Hagerstown Pike and returned the land to its wartime appearance.

== Battle of Antietam ==
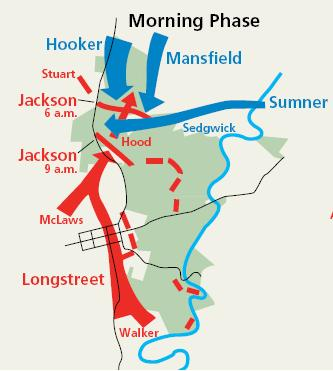
Morning Phase

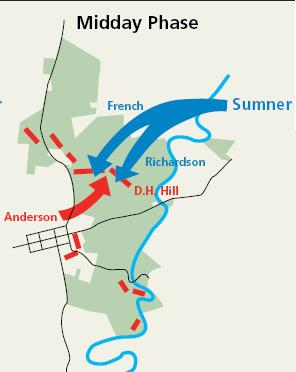
Midday Phase

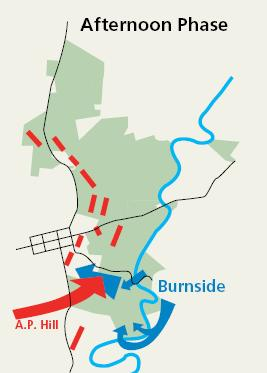
Afternoon Phase

=== Morning phase ===
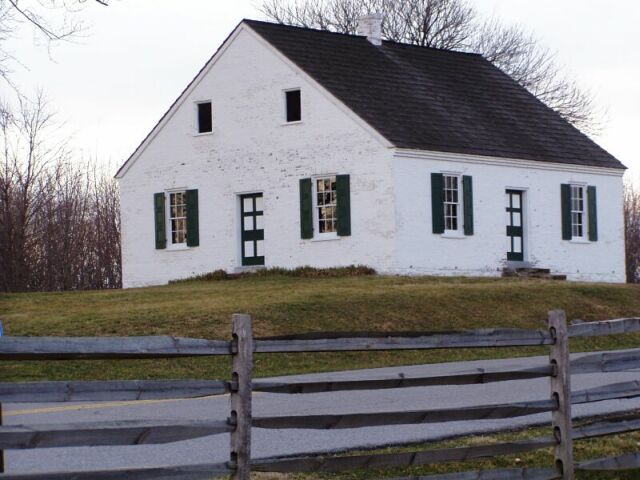
Dunker Church

The Battle began at dawn on September 17, 1862, when Maj. Gen. Joseph Hooker began the Union artillery bombardment of the Confederate positions of Maj. Gen. Thomas J. "Stonewall" Jackson in Miller's Cornfield. Hooker's troops advanced behind the falling shells and drove the Confederates from their positions. Around 7 a.m. Jackson reinforced his troops and pushed the Union troops back. Union Maj. Gen. Joseph K. Mansfield sent his men into the fray and regained some of the ground lost to the Confederates.

=== Midday phase ===
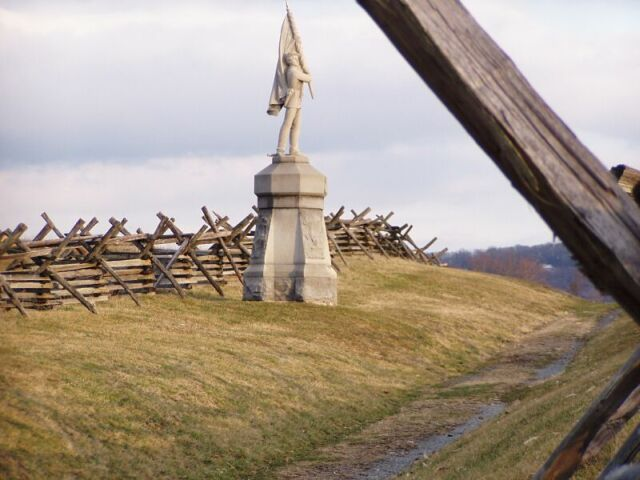
Sunken Road

As the fighting in the cornfield was coming to a close, Maj. Gen. William H. French was moving his Federals forward to support Maj. Gen. John Sedgwick and veered into Confederate Maj. Gen. D.H. Hill's troops posted in the Sunken Road. Fierce fighting continued here for four hours before the Union troops finally took the road.

=== Afternoon phase ===
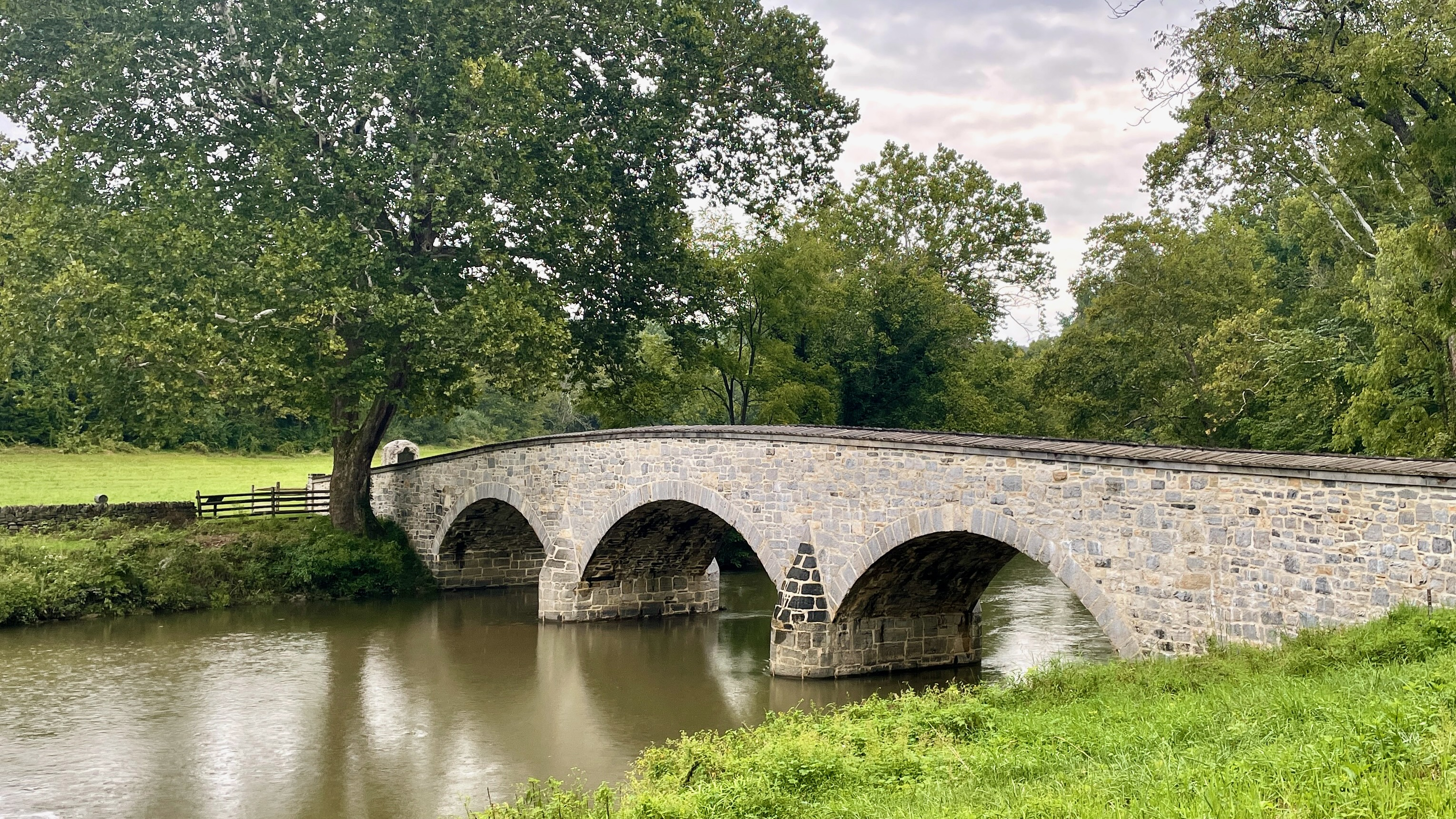
Burnside's Bridge

On the southeast side of town, Union Maj. Gen. Ambrose E. Burnside's IX Corps had been trying to cross Antietam Creek since mid-morning, being held up by only 500 Georgia sharpshooters. Around 1 p.m., they finally crossed Burnside's Bridge and took the heights. After a 2-hour lull to reform the Union lines, they advanced up the hill, driving the Confederates back towards Sharpsburg. But for the timely arrival of Maj. Gen. A.P. Hill's division from Harpers Ferry, Burnside would have entered Sharpsburg. Instead, the Union troops were driven back to the heights above the bridge.

=== Conclusion ===
The battle was over with the Union sitting on three sides, waiting for the next day. During the night of the 18th, General Lee pulled his troops back across the Potomac River, leaving the battle and the town to General McClellan. It was the bloodiest day in United States history, with a combined tally of 22,717 dead, wounded, or missing.
