= Thomas Burnham =

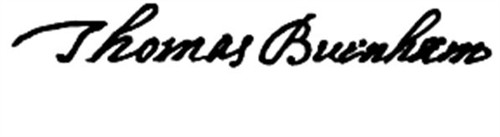

Thomas Burnham (1617 – June 24, 1688) was a lawyer and colonist, who was born in England and migrated to the American Colonies sometime prior to 1645. He lived most of his adult live in Connecticut where he was a lawyer and a landowner. He was among the earliest puritan settlers in Connecticut, living in Podunk and finally settling in Hartford, Connecticut. He purchased most of the land covered by the current towns of South Windsor, Connecticut, and East Hartford, Connecticut. He was the first American ancestor of a large number of Burnhams. He died in Hartford at the age of 69.

== Immigration to America ==
The ancestry of Thomas Burnham and when he departed from England is a subject of ongoing debate. One of his decedents and author of his 1884 genealogy, Roderick Henry Burnham, believes that his family came from Hatfield, Herefordshire, England. Genealogists Cathy Soughton and Henry B. Hoff found evidence that he was baptized at Long Crendon in Buckinghamshire, England on 28 October 1619, the son of John Burnham, a yeoman farmer; however, genealogist Mary Pitkin uncovered flaws in this conclusion. A letter from one of his descendants states that he sailed for the Barbados from Gravesend in 1635; but this Caribbean connection could be a mistake since a different Thomas Burnham was "buried from St. Michael’s, Barbados on 1 Aug 1674." There is no surviving record of when Burnham arrived in America, but he married Anna Wright ca. 1645 in Hartford, Connecticut. Pitkin states, "there are enough mentions of Thomas in Windsor over the years to prove that he was in Connecticut continuously between his arrival there and his death" on 28 June 1688 in Windsor, Hartford, Connecticut.

== Career and legacy ==
Burnham successfully defended a school teacher, Abigail Betts who had been accused of blasphemy, claiming "Christ was a bastard" and she could prove it through the scriptures. Burnham successfully defended her by asserting that blasphemy was not a capital crime in England, and thus could not be one in Connecticut under its charter. But by "saving her neck" the Puritan authorities disenfranchised him and prohibited Burnham from further practice of the court.

In 1659 he purchased from Tantonimo (sometimes spelled, Tan-tonimo), Chief sachem of the Potunke Native Americans, a tract of land now covered by the towns of South Windsor and East Hartford, on which he afterward lived, and a part of which is still in possession of his descendants. He held this land under a deed from Tantonimo, and later in 1661, by a deed from six of the latter's successors and allies, by which they renounce "all our right and title in those lands aforesayd unto Thomas Burnam and his heirs."

The possession of this land led to endless lawsuits, supported by the government, and it was ordered to be divided. Burnham refused to give it up, however, and the contest continued for many years. It resulted finally in the appointment in 1688, at a town meeting of the inhabitants of Hartford, "of a Committee in behalf of this town, to" treat with Thomas Burnham, Senior, upon his claim to the lands on the East side of the Great River." He erected a house on these lands at Potunke, which was one of five, on the east side of the Connecticut, to be fortified and garrisoned during the Indian war of 1675, King Philip's War. In 1649-56-59-60, he appears as plaintiff in court, and usually argued his own cases.

Before his death he had divided the greater part of his estate among his children by deed, with the condition that it should remain in the family.

== Family ==
Coat of Arms of Thomas Burnham

The Burnham family had lived at Long Crendon since at least the early 1500s. Originally labourers, their fortunes improved during the course of the 16th and 17th centuries with several members of the English branch of the family becoming local attorneys from the mid-1600s until the early 19th century. There is no record of Thomas Burnham studying law in England but it seems probable. After he emigrated he married Anna Wright Burnham (1620 - August 4, 1703) in Hartford circa 1645. The daughter of Captain Richard Wright, she died in Hartford at the age of 83. Their children were all born in Hartford, and the dates below are based on research by historian Roderick H. Burnham with minor updates by genealogist Mary Pitkin:

- Elizabeth Burnham (About 1640 - December 2, 1720), married Nicholas Morecock
- Mary Burnham (1642 - January 25, 1720), married William Morton
- Anna (Hannah) Burnham (1644 - November 29, 1722), married Samuel Gaines
- Thomas Burnham (1646 - March 19, 1726), married Naomi Hull
- John Burnham (1648 - April 20, 1721), married Mary Olcott
- Samuel Burnham (1650 - April 12, 1728), married Mary Cadwell
- William Burnham (1652 - December 12, 1730), married Elizabeth Loomis
- Richard Burnham (1654 - April 28, 1731), married Sarah Humphries. A blacksmith, he got into trouble mending guns for the Native Americans. Frederick Russell Burnham is one of his descendants.
- Rebecca Burnham (1656 - ???), married William Mann

== Bibliography ==
- Burnham, Roderick Henry (1884). Genealogical Records of Thomas Burnham, the Emigrant, who was Among the Early Settlers at Hartford, Connecticut, U.S. America, and His Descendants. Hartford, CT: Case, Lockwood & Brainard Co.
- Cutter, William Richard, ed. (1919). American biography: a new cyclopedia. Vol. 6. New York: The American Historical Society.
- Hinman, Royal Ralph (1852). Catalogue of the first Puritan settlers of the colony of Connecticut. Hartford: Case, Tiffany and Co.
- Pitkin, Mary (March 9, 2013). "The Confusing Origins of Thomas Burnham". Hartford: My Genealogy Research.
- Pitkin, Mary (May 18, 2016). "How Many Thomas Burnhams Are There?". Hartford: My Genealogy Research.
- Burnham, Jim (May 18, 2016). "Thomas Burnham Burial in Barbados". Hartford: My Genealogy Research.
- Soughton, Cathy (January 2012). "Thomas 1 Burnham of Long Crendon, Buckinghamshire, and Hartford, Connecticut". 166. Boston, Massachusetts: The New England Historical and Genealogical Register.
