= Westwood School =

Westwood School may refer to:

- A former name for Westwood Elementary, a school in the Westwood neighborhood of Cincinnati, Ohio, United States
- Westwood Girls School, a former school in Reading, England, United Kingdom

== See also ==
- Westwood College
- Westwood Community School District
- Westwood High School
