= 139th Pennsylvania Infantry Regiment =

Union Army infantry regiment

- Pennsylvania flag
- Active: September 1, 1862, to June 21, 1865
- Country: United States
- Allegiance: Union
- Branch: Infantry
- Size: 1,697
- Part of: IV Corps
- Engagements: Second Battle of Bull Run; Battle of Antietam; Battle of Fredericksburg; Battle of Gettysburg; Valley campaigns of 1864; Overland Campaign; Siege of Petersburg; Battle of Fort Stevens; Battle of Opequon; Battle of Sailor's Creek

The 139th Pennsylvania Infantry Regiment was an infantry regiment in the Union Army during the American Civil War. Organized on September 1, 1861, at Camp Howe, it would fight from the Second Battle of Bull Run to the surrender of Lee's army at Appomattox Court House, while being attached to the IV Corps.

== Organization ==
The 139th was formed at Camp Howe, near Pittsburgh, on September 1, 1862. Frederick H. Collier was the first colonel.

The companies of this regiment were recruited at:

- Company A - Mercer County
- Company B - Armstrong County
- Company C - Armstrong County
- Company D - Allegheny County
- Company E - Allegheny and Armstrong Counties
- Company F - Allegheny and Armstrong Counties
- Company G - Allegheny County
- Company H - Beaver and Allegheny County
- Company I - Allegheny County
- Company K - Allegheny County

Battle of Antietam, Depiction of the fighting near Dunker Church by Thure de Thulstrup

== Service ==
=== 1862 ===
Once mustered, the regiment was immediately sent to Harrisburg, Pennsylvania on September 2, receiving their armaments before arriving at Washington, D.C., on September 3. Due to the dead not being buried in the aftermath of the Second Battle of Bull Run, the regiment was tasked to bury the dead for three days.

After burying the dead on the field of Second Battle of Bull Run, the regiment was present on the Battle of Antietam but wasn't engaged, on the following day, the regiment moved towards the Potomac River, and engaged against the Confederates in a skirmish near Williamsport.

The regiment was attached to Howe's Brigade of Couch's Division of the IV Corps of the Army of the Potomac where it replaced De Trobriand's 55th New York "Gardes Lafayette" on September 11, 1862. The composition of this brigade remained unchanged from this point until the war's end and included the 62d NY, 93d PVI, 98th PVI and the 102d PVI.

=== 1863 ===
The 139th was transferred in October 1862 to the VI Corps. In the Battle of Fredericksburg, it suffered minor casualties from artillery fire, but didn't get a chance to fight. Five months later, however, it did participate in the 2nd Battle of Fredericksburg. At the Battle of Gettysburg in July, it helped defend the left flank of the Union army.

=== 1864 ===
Throughout the spring and into early summer of 1864, the 139th fought in Grant's Overland Campaign and the early stages of the Siege of Petersburg. In July, it was transferred to Washington, D.C., with the rest of the VI Corps to defeat Lt. Gen. Jubal Early's attack on the city. Then they fought under Philip Sheridan in the Shenandoah Valley to ensure that no more Confederate armies would invade again. (See the article on the campaign). By December 1864, they were sent back to the siege lines of Petersburg.

=== Later service ===
The 139th supported Sheridan in the Appomattox Campaign and fought in the Battle of Sailor's Creek. After the surrender of Lee and his army at Appomattox Courthouse, it was ordered to the North Carolina border to support William T. Sherman, but the Confederate surrender there made further support unnecessary. The regiment was mustered out June 21, 1865.

== Commanders ==
- Colonel Frederick H. Collier
- Lieutenant Colonel James D. Owens
- Major William H. Moody (Killed in action at the Battle of Cold Harbor at June 2, 1864)

== Casualties ==
- Killed and mortally wounded: 10 officers, 141 enlisted men
- Wounded: 36 officers, 424 enlisted men
- Died of disease: 5 officers, 29 enlisted men
- Captured or missing: 1 officers, 54 men
- Total casualties: 52 officers, 648 men

== See also ==
- List of Pennsylvania Civil War regiments
- Pennsylvania in the Civil War
