= Western Wood =

Western Wood may refer to:

- Western Wood (MP) (1804–1863), British Liberal Party politician, Member of Parliament for the City of London 1861–63
- Western Wood (Queensland politician) (1830—1878), son of the above, Member of the Queensland Legislative Council

== See also ==
- Augsburg-Western Woods Nature Park, nature park in Bavarian Swabia, Germany
- West Wood (disambiguation)
- Westwood (disambiguation)
