= Westwood =

Westwood may refer to:

== Companies and brands ==
- Westwood, Baillie, 19th-century engineering and shipbuilding company, London
- Westwood One (1976–2011), a former American radio network based in New York City
- Westwood One, an American radio and media broadcasting company
- Westwood Studios, an American video game developer, defunct since 2003
- Westwood, a brand of American manufacturer Ariens

== Educational institutions ==
- Westwood High School (disambiguation), several schools

=== United States ===
- Westwood College, American for-profit college
- Westwood Regional School District, Bergen County, New Jersey

=== Canada ===
- Westwood Elementary School (Coquitlam), British Columbia
- Westwood Elementary School (Prince George), British Columbia
- Westwood Secondary School (now Lincoln M. Alexander Secondary School), Mississauga, Ontario

=== Other ===
- Westwood International School, Gaborone, Botswana
- Westwood Secondary School, Singapore

== People ==
- Westwood (surname)
- Baron Westwood, a title in the British peerage
- Vivienne Westwood (1941-2022), British fashion designer

== Places ==
=== Australia ===
- Westwood, Queensland, a town in the Rockhampton Region
- Westwood, Tasmania
- Westwood, Western Australia, a locality of the Shire of Woodanilling

=== Canada ===
- Westwood, Asphodel-Norwood, Ontario
- Westwood, Edmonton, a neighbourhood in Edmonton, Alberta
- Westwood Plateau, an area of Coquitlam, British Columbia
- Westwood Motorsport Park, a race track in Coquitlam, British Columbia
- Westwood, St. James-Assiniboia, Winnipeg, Manitoba
- Port Moody-Westwood, a provincial electoral district for the Legislative Assembly of British Columbia
- Port Moody—Westwood—Port Coquitlam, a federal electoral district in British Columbia

=== England ===
- Westwood, Peterborough, Cambridgeshire
- Westwood, Greater Manchester, a district of Oldham
- Westwood, Kent
  - Westwood Cross shopping centre
- Westwood House, country house near Droitwich, Worcestershire
  - Westwood, Worcestershire, a civil parish named after the house
- Westwood, Somerset, village in West Bagborough parish
- Westwood, Southfleet, Kent
- Westwood, Wiltshire
- High Westwood, County Durham
- Low Westwood, County Durham
- Westwood Heath, Coventry, West Midlands
- Westwood (Campus), University of Warwick
- Westwoodside, North Lincolnshire
- Stretton Westwood and Bourton Westwood, Shropshire

=== Scotland ===
- Westwood, East Kilbride, South Lanarkshire

=== United States ===
- Westwood (Uniontown, Alabama), an 1836 historic district on the National Register of Historic Places
- Westwood, California
- Westwood, Los Angeles, a neighborhood
  - Westwood Village Memorial Park Cemetery
- Westwood, Indiana
- Westwood, Iowa
- Westwood, Kansas
- Westwood, Boyd County, Kentucky
- Westwood, Jefferson County, Kentucky
- Westwood, Massachusetts
- Westwood, Memphis, Tennessee, a neighborhood
- Westwood, Michigan
- Westwood, Missouri
- Westwood, New Jersey
- Westwood, Cincinnati, a neighborhood
- Westwood, Cambria County, Pennsylvania, a census-designated place
- Westwood, Chester County, Pennsylvania, a census-designated place
- Westwood (Pittsburgh), Pennsylvania, a neighborhood
- West Wood, Utah, a census-designated place
- Westwood, Bainbridge Island, Washington
- Westwood, Seattle
- Westwood (subdivision), Houston
- Westwood Highlands, San Francisco, a neighborhood
- Westwood Hills, Kansas
- Westwood Lakes, Florida, a census-designated place
- Westwood Park, San Francisco, a neighborhood
- Westwoods Trails, a hiking trail system in Connecticut

== Transportation ==
- Westwood station (LIRR), in Malverne, New York
- Westwood station (NJ Transit), in Westwood, New Jersey
- Westwood Boulevard, Los Angeles, California
  - Westwood/Rancho Park station
  - Westwood/UCLA station, a subway station under construction

== Other uses ==
- Westwood (computer virus), a minor variant of the Jerusalem virus
- Westwood Cross, shopping centre in Kent, England
- Westwood rim, a type of bicycle wheel rim
- "Sons of Westwood", fight song of the University of California, Los Angeles
- TCP Westwood, a congestion avoidance mechanism in data transmission
- TCP Westwood plus, a modification of TCP Westood
- Westwood, a novel by Stella Gibbons

== See also ==
- West Wood (disambiguation)
- West Woods, Wiltshire, England
- West Woods (Antietam), Sharpsburg, Maryland
