= 34th New York Infantry Regiment =

- Active: June 15th, 1861 to June 30, 1863
- Country: United States
- Allegiance: Union
- Branch: U.S. Army
- Type: Infantry
- Size: 1,100
- Nickname: "Herkimer Regiment"
- Engagements: American Civil War: Battle of Ball's Bluff; Battle of Yorktown (1862); Battle of Fair Oaks; Seven Days' Battles; Battle of Antietam; Battle of Fredericksburg; Battle of Chancellorsville

Commanders
- Colonel: William LaDew
- Colonel: James A. Suiter
- Colonel: Byron Laflin

Insignia
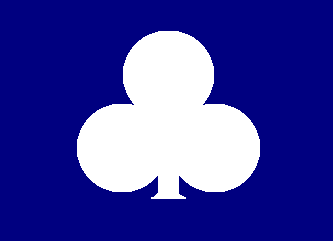
- 2nd Division, II Corps

The 34th New York Infantry Regiment, the "Herkimer Regiment", was an infantry regiment of the Union Army during the American Civil War.

== Service ==
The regiment was organized in Albany, New York, on May 24, 1861, and was mustered in for a two-year enlistment on June 15, 1861; it was composed of five companies from Herkimer County, two from Steuben, one from Albany, one from Clinton and one from Essex County. Part of the 38th Militia entered this regiment on June 8, 1863; the regiment was mustered out of service on June 30, 1863, and those men who had signed three year enlistments were transferred to the 82nd New York.

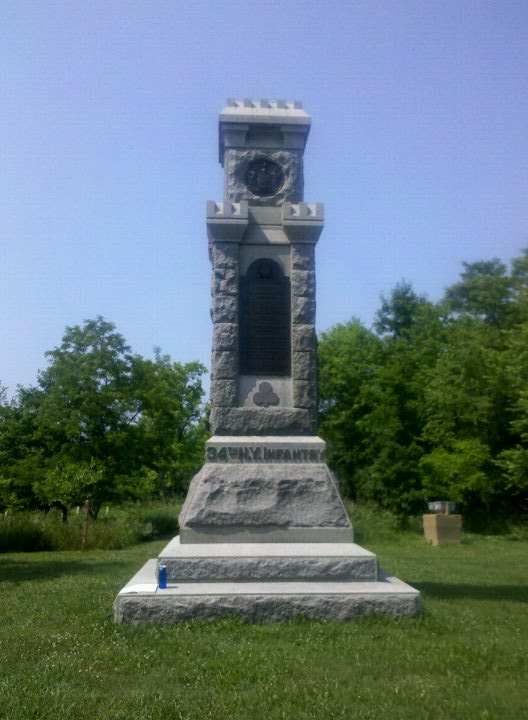
34th New York Infantry monument at Antietam National Battlefield.

Colonel—Byron Lafflin
Lieutenant-Colonel—John Beverley
Major—Wells Sponable

=== STAFF ===
Adjutant—John Kirk.
Quartermaster—Nathan Easterbrooks
Surgeon—B. F. Manley
Assistant-Surgeon—J. Hurley Miller
Chaplain—S. Franklin Schoonmaker
LINE
Co. A — Captain. B H. Warford; First Lieutenant, R. L. Brown; Second Lieutenant, John Oathout
Co. B — Captain Irving D. Clark; First Lieutenant, Francis N. Usher; Second Lieutenant, William Burns
Co. C — Captain, Thomas Corcoran; First Lieutenant, Simeon P. McIntyre
Co. D — Captain, John O. Scott; First Lieutenant, vacant; Second Lieutenant, Byron Coats
Co. E — Captain, Henry Baldwin; First Lieutenant, Henry T. Sanford; Second Lieutenant, Melville S. Dunn
Co. F — Captain, Charles Riley; First Lieutenant, William Van Valkenburgh; Second Lieutenant, B. F. Minor
Co. G — Captain, Joy P. Johnson; First Lieutenant, John Morey; Second Lieutenant, A. Rounds
Co. H — Captain, William S. Walton; First Lieutenant, vacant; Second Lieutenant, William Kirk
Co. I — Captain, Eugene B. Larrowe; First Lieutenant, A. T. Atwood; Second Lieutenant, Orrin W. Beach
Co. K — Captain, Emerson S. Northup; First Lieutenant, James McCormick; Second Lieutenant, Lewis. M. Chapin

The companies were recruited principally:

- A at West Troy;
- B at Little Falls;
- C at Graysville and Norway;
- D at Champlain;
- E at Addison;
- F and G at Herkimer;
- H at Crown Point;
- I at Hammondsport, and
- K at Salisbury.

During the Battle of Antietam, the regiment was assigned to the 1st Brigade (Willis A. Gorman commanding), 2nd Division (John Sedgwick commanding), II Corps (Edwin V. Sumner commanding).

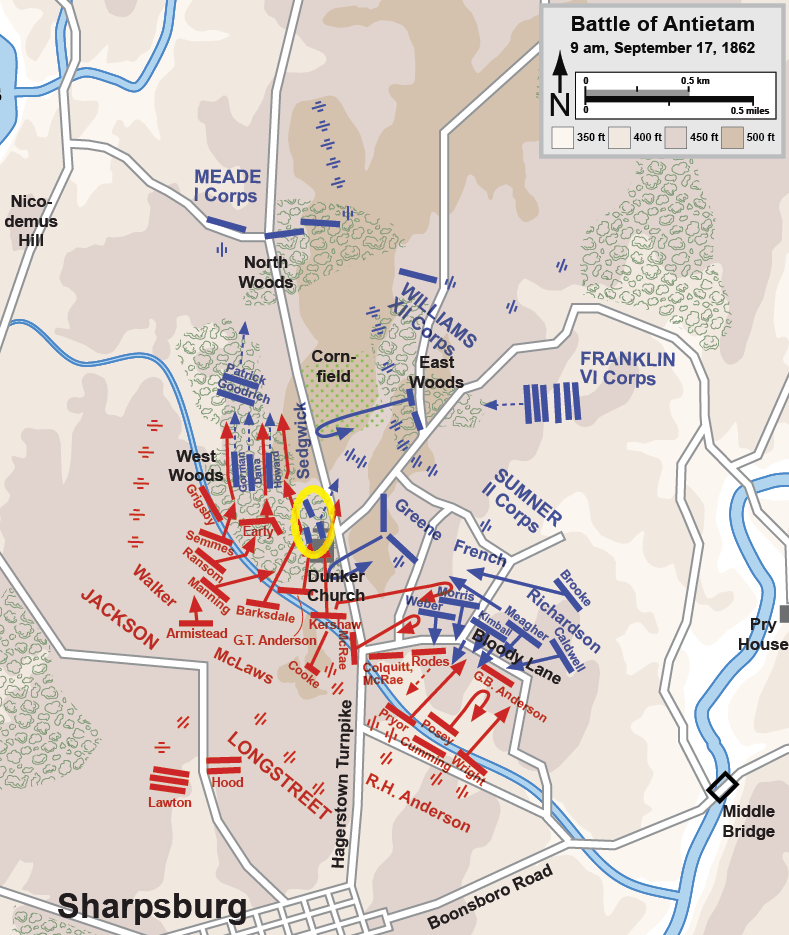
125th PA & 34th NY (inside yellow oval) are counter-attacked shortly after 9 a.m.

At 7:30 on the morning of September 17, 1862, the Thirty-fourth Regiment left camp near Keedysville, crossed the Antietam Creek and marched westward into the East Woods, now extinct. Facing Westward being on the extreme left of Brigade line it emerged from the East Woods and soon became heavily engaged with the Confederate forces in its front. Crossing the open field and the Hagerstown Pike, it entered the West Woods, now also extinct, the line extending North and South of the Dunkard Church. The left of the Regiment being unprotected was in danger of being enveloped by the enemy, and a hasty retreat became necessary; the Regiment reforming near the East Woods with its organization intact. In a very brief time 43 men had been killed and 74 wounded, the killed being 13 percent of all engaged.

The regiment lost 14 men killed or wounded at Fredericksburg and an additional 18 men captured.

On May 1, 1863, during the Battle of Chancellorsville, six companies of the regiment mutinied and refused to fight on the grounds that their two year enlistment terms had expired, although in fact this was still almost two months away. Brig. Gen John Gibbon, who commanded the division that the 34th New York was in, brought up the 15th Massachusetts and gave them orders to shoot the men of the 34th New York if they wouldn't fight. The regiment reformed and served dutifully during the Second Battle of Fredericksburg two days later. On June 30, the 34th New York mustered out and the two year men went home, the remaining companies, who had signed up for three years of service, being transferred to the 82nd New York Infantry.

== Total strength and casualties ==
The total enrollment of the regiment was 1,016 members, of whom 93 were killed in action or died of wounds during the term of service and 69 died from other causes. During its service the regiment lost by death, killed in action, 1 officer, 65 enlisted men; of wounds received in action, 2 officers, 26 enlisted men; of disease and other causes, 1 officer, 67 enlisted men; total, 4 officers, 158 enlisted men; aggregate, 162.

== Commanders ==
- Colonel William LaDew
- Colonel James A. Suiter
- Colonel Byron Laflin

== See also ==
- List of New York Civil War regiments
