= Westwood (surname) =

Westwood is a surname. Notable people with the surname include:

- Barry Westwood, presenter of "Day by Day" on Southern Television
- Bill Westwood (1925–1999), Anglican bishop in England, father of DJ Tim Westwood
- Brett Westwood, British naturalist, radio presenter and author
- Bryan Westwood (1930–2000), Australian artist
- David Westwood, British police officer
- Hugh Westwood, English politician
- Ian Westwood, English cricketer
- Jim Westwood, British computer engineer
- John Obadiah Westwood (1805–1893), British entomologist
- John Portsmouth Football Club Westwood (born 1963), bookseller and football fan
- Joseph Westwood (1884–1948), Scottish politician
- Julie Westwood (born 1952), English voice actress
- Karen Westwood, British actress
- Keiren Westwood (born 1984), Irish international football player
- Lee Westwood (born 1973), British golfer
- Tim Westwood (born 1957), British hip hop DJ, son of Bishop Bill Westwood
- Troy Westwood (born 1967), Canadian football player
- Vivienne Westwood (1941–2022), English fashion designer
- William Westwood (1821–1846), British-born Australian bushranger known as Jackey Jackey
- William James Westwood (1887–1954), Canadian politician
- Worlich Westwood (fl. 1770–1805) American politician

== See also ==
- Westwood (disambiguation)
