= West Wood =

West Wood may refer to:

- West Wood, Little Sampford, a nature reserve in Essex, England
- West Wood, Utah, a place in Carbon County, Utah, United States
- West Wood Club, a chain of fitness centres in Dublin, Ireland

== See also ==
- Westwood (disambiguation)
- West Woods, Wiltshire, England
- West Woods (Antietam), Sharpsburg, Maryland
