= West Woods (Antietam) =

Battlefield site near Sharpsburg, Maryland

- Part of Battle of Antietam
- Sharpsburg, Maryland
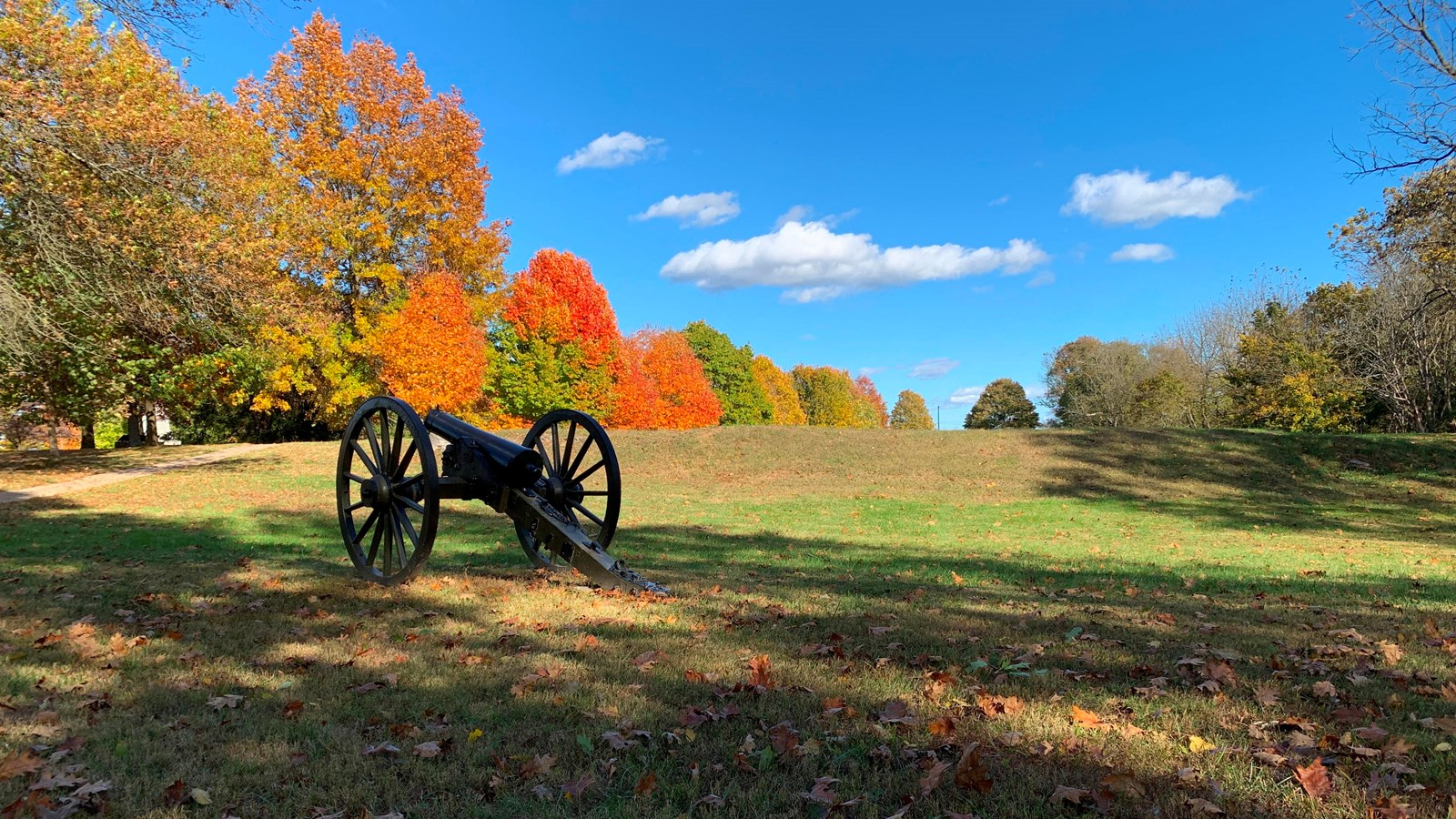
- The West Woods

Site information
- Owner: National Park, National Register of Historic Places
- Controlled by: United States National Park Service (part)
- Condition: Preserved and commemorated

Location
- Coordinates: 39°28′24″N 77°44′41″W

Site history
- In use: Site of major battle on September 17, 1862
- Battles/wars: Battle of Antietam
- Events: First major battle fought on Union soil during the American Civil War

The West Woods was a wooded area on the western side of the Antietam Battlefield that witnessed intense combat during the Battle of Antietam on September 17, 1862, a significant battle during the American Civil War. Approximately one mile north of Sharpsburg, Maryland, its southern edge measured approximately 300 yards in width, narrowing to about 200 yards or less as it extended northwest from the Hagerstown Turnpike. A key landmark, the Dunker Church, stood near its southeastern corner. Major General John Sedgwick's division of the Army of the Potomac's II Corps fell into an ambush by two Confederate divisions, suffering heavy casualties. It was the location where future U.S. Supreme Court associate justice Oliver Wendell Holmes Jr. received one of his wounds while serving in the Union Army.

== History ==
=== The Stand of the 125th Pennsylvania ===
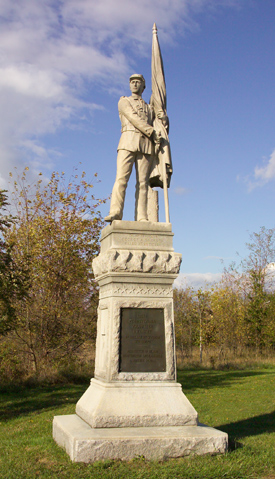
125th Pennsylvania Infantry Monument at Antietam National Battlefield

While the I Corps under Maj. Gen. Joseph Hooker advanced on the Confederate left, Maj. Gen. Edwin V. Sumner's II Corps remained east of Antietam Creek awaiting orders. After a delay (attributed by some sources to Maj. Gen.George B. McClellan's unavailability, though contemporaneous accounts differ), Sumner personally led Sedgwick's division across the creek around 9:00 a.m. Following a briefing near the East Woods, Sumner ordered Sedgwick's division to advance across the Hagerstown Pike into the West Woods. The division advanced in three brigade lines. Postwar analysis suggested Sumner sought to exploit earlier Union gains before Confederate forces could regroup.

Isolated Union units were also engaged within the woods. The 125th Pennsylvania Infantry Regiment belonging to XII Corps, under Colonel Jacob Higgins, entered the woods under unclear orders to dislodge Confederate skirmishers threatening artillery positions. Higgins' men soon encountered fire from Confederate Brigadier General Jubal A. Early's Virginians, including the 49th Virginia Infantry Regiment. The 125th Pennsylvania reported delivering effective fire, repelling several charges, though suffering losses including their color-bearer. Meanwhile, elements of the 34th New York Infantry Regiment, having become separated from their brigade, positioned themselves behind the 125th Pennsylvania near the Dunker Church. The 34th New York immediately engaged the 2nd South Carolina Infantry Regiment at close range, reporting significant casualties but holding their position under heavy fire. In 1902, a monument was dedicated to the 34th New York near the site of the Dunker Church. In 1904, a statue featuring color sergeant George A. Simpson was dedicated to the 125th Pennsylvania near the same site.

=== Sedgwick Enters the West Woods ===
Map of the Battle of Antietam around the West Woods

Early established a thin defensive line using his Virginia Brigade and remnants of other units. Shortly before Sumner advanced Sedgwick's division, the Union brigade of Colonel William B. Goodrich of XII Corps moved forward. Goodrich's brigade deployed with the 3rd Delaware Infantry Regiment skirmishing ahead of the 60th New York Infantry Regiment and 78th New York Infantry Regiment. Early's troops delivered concentrated fire, mortally wounding Goodrich and prompting the Union brigade's withdrawal. Early's forces subsequently also pulled back towards the Dunker Church, engaging the 125th Pennsylvania (as previously noted). This mutual disengagement temporarily cleared the area.

Sedgwick's division advanced into the West Woods in three brigade lines: Brigadier General Willis A. Gorman's brigade in front, followed by Brig. Gen. Napoleon J. T. Dana, and Brig. Gen. Oliver O. Howard's brigade in the rear. The division crossed the Hagerstown Turnpike and entered the woods under artillery fire. As Howard's brigade reached the woods, he observed disorganized Union troops withdrawing from the area near the Dunker Church, likely including the 125th Pennsylvania and 34th New York. Confederate forces under Brig. Gen. William Barksdale advanced from a ravine parallel to the turnpike. Barksdale's Mississippians maneuvered around the Union left flank and rear, attacking Howard's exposed position. Attempts by Dana's 7th Michigan Infantry Regiment and 42nd New York Infantry Regiment to counter this threat were largely ineffective, resulting in significant casualties and disorderly retreat within those regiments. The 42nd New York lost around 180 of its number, more than half the regiment. Sumner was a quarter of a mile from where his left and rear came under fire, with Gorman's lead brigade. When he realized what was happening, he allegedly shouted, "By God, we must get out of this!" before galloping to the rear. When he rode up to the second and third brigade lines, he told the confused troops: "Back, boys, for God's sake, move back! You are in a bad fix!" The first brigade to break was Howard's Pennsylvanians, who suffered around 550 casualties in ten minutes and fled to the north.

As Dana moved forward with his remaining regiments, the brigade descended into denser woodland under intense fire. Barksdale's men, joined by elements of Early's command, concentrated their attack on Dana's new left flank, the 59th New York Infantry Regiment. Dana was wounded, and the 59th New York's commander mortally wounded. In the confusion, the 59th New York fired towards the perceived threat, inadvertently causing casualties in the rear ranks of the 15th Massachusetts Infantry Regiment (Gorman's brigade, the front line) due to the division's tightly stacked formation. Units in the center of Dana's line, unable to effectively return fire because of the obstructed view caused by the front line, suffered heavy losses while standing exposed. Sumner and Sedgwick arrived personally to restore order. Sedgwick was wounded three times but remained temporarily. Under sustained pressure from Barksdale and Early, Dana's surviving troops eventually withdrew towards Miller's Cornfield in a relatively more organized manner than Howard's brigade, with some units forming a final defensive position against advancing Confederate reinforcements under Maj. Gen. Lafayette McLaws.

McLaws arrived near the West Woods after a night march from Harpers Ferry with a depleted force of approximately 2,825 men. Upon reaching the field, McLaws intended to deploy his four brigades in a line oriented by the Hagerstown Pike and launch a coordinated assault to retake the woods. However, multiple disruptions altered this plan. As his other brigades began forming in a nearby plowed field, Cobb's Legion lost direction while marching through a cornfield and instead moved eastward across the Hagerstown Pike, ultimately linking up with Brig. Gen. Robert E. Rodes' brigade near the Bloody Lane. As these events unfolded, Union troops entered the southern edge of the West Woods. With time running out and his force divided, McLaws was forced to commit his available units piecemeal into action.

=== McLaws Forces Sedgwick Out ===
As the leftmost regiment in Sedgwick's first line, the 15th Massachusetts engaged Brig. Gen. Paul J. Semmes' brigade at close range, reportedly within 15-20 yards. Despite sustaining heavy casualties in a prolonged exchange, Gorman's line initially held its position. The 15th Massachusetts reportedly withdrew only upon direct orders, with its commander noting the regiment had been prepared to sustain significant casualties to maintain its position. Concurrently, the center of Gorman's line, the 82nd New York Infantry Regiment, also began withdrawing under pressure. On Gorman's right flank, the 1st Minnesota Infantry Regiment occupied a protected position behind a rock wall and maintained its position longer than other units. Gorman ordered a withdrawal to the right to avoid encirclement by advancing Confederate forces, citing the sudden and overwhelming nature of the flank attack. Oliver Wendell Holmes, serving as a lieutenant in the 20th Massachusetts Infantry Regiment, was wounded a bullet struck him in the neck and passed completely through, not hitting anything vital. He fell to the ground unconscious.

The Rebel troops shattered the left flank of Sedgwick's division in less than 15 minutes. Around 2,500 Union soldiers were overwhelmed by a smaller force, resulting in 938 Federal casualties, including 173 killed, while Confederate losses were significantly lower. Poor coordination and lack of effective leadership left the Union regiments vulnerable despite their individual bravery. The Confederate pursuit reached the D. R. Miller farm buildings north of the Cornfield. However, the Confederate momentum was halted by a newly formed Union defensive line under Howard and intense artillery fire, forcing McLaws's men to withdraw back to the West Woods by late morning. Brig. Gen. George H. Gordon advanced elements of his XII Corps brigade from the East Woods towards the Cornfield and encountered volley fire from the fresh Confederate brigade of Brig. Gen. Robert Ransom, recently deployed from the Confederate right flank to support McLaws. Assessing the strength of the Confederate position, Gordon ordered a withdrawal back to the East Woods, concluding that further engagement would result in significant losses without tactical advantage. Ransom's troops attempted pursuit but were met with concentrated canister fire from several Union artillery batteries. This artillery response proved decisive, halting the Confederate advance and compelling Ransom's men to promptly withdraw.

=== Legacy ===
Historical analysis of Sumner's tactics remains varied. Contemporary and 19th-century critics highlighted vulnerabilities in the closely formed, unsupported advance. Historian Scott Hartwig has criticized Sumner for not establishing a command post to coordinate the I, II, and XII Corps assets. Instead, he personally led Sedgwick's advance, limiting his ability to direct supporting units or integrate other units upon their arrival. Sumner also ordered Sedgwick's division to advance in a compact, three-brigade formation without deploying skirmishers or securing its flanks. This formation, combined with the lack of coordinated support, left the division vulnerable to flanking attacks as it entered the West Woods. Retired US Army reserve officer Marion Armstrong, however, suggests Sumner's decision reflected available intelligence and aimed to exploit perceived Confederate weakness.
