= Westwood Community School District =

Westwood Community School District can refer to:

- Westwood Community School District (Iowa)
- Westwood Community School District (Michigan)
