= Westwood High School =

Westwood High School may refer to:

== Canada ==
- Westwood High School Senior Campus, in Hudson, Quebec
- Westwood High School – Junior Campus, in Saint-Lazare, Quebec
- Westwood Community High School, in Fort McMurray, Alberta

== Jamaica ==
- Westwood High School, Jamaica, Stewart Town, Trelawny, Jamaica

== United Kingdom ==
- Westwood College, Leek, previously known as Westwood High School, in Leek, Staffordshire
- Westwood Girls' College, previously known as Westwood High School, in Upper Norwood, London

== United States ==
- Westwood High School (Mesa, Arizona), in Mesa, Arizona
- Westwood High School (California), in Westwood, California; see California Conference
- Fort Pierce Westwood High School, in Fort Pierce, Florida
- Westwood Schools, in Camilla, Georgia
- Westwood High School (Iowa), a high school in Sloan, Iowa
- Westwood High School (Massachusetts), in Westwood, Massachusetts
- Westwood High School (Michigan), in Marquette County, Michigan
- Westwood Regional High School, serving Westwood, and Washington Township, New Jersey
- Westwood High School (South Carolina), in Richland County School District Two, Blythewood, South Carolina
- Westwood High School (Tennessee), a Memphis City School, Memphis, Tennessee
- Westwood High School (Austin, Texas), in Austin, Texas
- Westwood High School (Palestine, Texas), in Palestine, Texas
- Westwood High School (Wyoming), in Campbell County School District Number 1, Gillette, Wyoming
