= Battle of Antietam =

1862 battle of the American Civil War

Battle of Antietam Battle of Sharpsburg
- Part of the American Civil War
- Depiction of the fighting near Dunker Church by Thure de Thulstrup
Date	September 17, 1862
Location	Washington County, near Sharpsburg, Maryland, U.S. 39°28′24″N 77°44′41″W
Result	Union victory (see aftermath)

Belligerents
United States (Union)	Confederate States

Commanders and leaders
George B. McClellan	Robert E. Lee

Units involved
Army of the Potomac	Army of Northern Virginia

Strength
53,632 engaged 275 artillery pieces	30,646 engaged 194 artillery pieces

Casualties and losses
12,410; 2,108 killed 9,549 wounded 753 captured or missing	10,316; 1,546 killed 7,752 wounded 1,018 captured or missing

The Battle of Antietam (/ænˈtiːtəm/ an-TEE-təm), also called the Battle of Sharpsburg (particularly in the Southern United States) took place during the American Civil War on September 17, 1862, near Antietam Creek and Sharpsburg, Maryland, between the Army of Northern Virginia, led by Confederate General Robert E. Lee, and the Army of the Potomac, led by Union Major General George B. McClellan. Part of the Maryland Campaign, it was the first field army–level engagement in the Eastern Theater of the American Civil War to take place on Union soil. It remains the bloodiest day in American history, with a tally of 22,726 dead, wounded, or missing on both sides. Although the Union army suffered heavier casualties than the Confederates, the battle was a major turning point in the Union's favor.

After pursuing Lee into Maryland, McClellan and the Union army launched attacks against Lee's army who were in defensive positions behind Antietam Creek. At dawn on September 17, Major General Joseph Hooker's corps mounted a powerful assault on Lee's left flank. Attacks and counterattacks swept across Miller's Cornfield, and fighting swirled around the Dunker Church. Union assaults against the Sunken Road eventually pierced the Confederate center but the Federal advantage was not followed up. In the afternoon, Union Major General Ambrose Burnside's corps entered the action, capturing a stone bridge over Antietam Creek and advancing against the Confederate right. At a crucial moment, Confederate Major General A. P. Hill's division arrived from Harpers Ferry and launched a surprise counterattack, driving back Burnside and ending the battle. Although outnumbered two-to-one, Lee committed his entire force, while McClellan sent in less than three-quarters of his army, enabling Lee to fight the Federals to a standstill. During the night, both armies consolidated their lines. In spite of crippling casualties, Lee continued to skirmish with McClellan throughout September 18, while removing his battered army south of the Potomac River.

McClellan successfully turned Lee's invasion back, making the battle a strategic Union victory. From a tactical standpoint, the battle was somewhat inconclusive; the Union army successfully repelled the Confederate invasion, but suffered heavier casualties and failed to defeat Lee's army outright. President Abraham Lincoln, unhappy with McClellan's general pattern of over-caution and his failure to pursue the retreating Lee, relieved McClellan of command in November.

Nevertheless, the strategic accomplishment was a significant turning point in the war in favor of the Union due in large part to its political ramifications: the battle's result gave Lincoln the political confidence to issue the Emancipation Proclamation. This effectively discouraged the British and French governments from recognizing the Confederacy, as neither power wished to give the appearance of supporting slavery.

== Background ==
Maryland Campaign, actions September 3 to 15, 1862 Confederate Union

Robert E. Lee's Army of Northern Virginia—about 55,000 men—entered the state of Maryland on September 3, following their victory at Second Bull Run on August 30. Emboldened by success, the Confederate leadership intended to take the war into enemy territory. Lee's invasion of Maryland was intended to run simultaneously with an invasion of Kentucky by the armies of Braxton Bragg and Edmund Kirby Smith. It was also necessary for logistical reasons, as northern Virginia's farms had been stripped bare of food. Based on events such as the Baltimore riots in the spring of 1861 and the fact that President Lincoln had to pass through the city in disguise en route to his inauguration, Confederate leaders assumed that Maryland would welcome the Confederate forces warmly. They sang the tune "Maryland, My Maryland!" as they marched, but by the fall of 1862 pro-Union sentiment was winning out, especially in the western parts of the state. Civilians generally hid inside their houses as Lee's army passed through their towns, or watched in cold silence, while the Army of the Potomac was cheered and encouraged. Some Confederate politicians, including President Jefferson Davis, believed that the prospect of foreign recognition would increase if the Confederacy won a military victory on Union soil; such a victory might gain recognition and financial support from the United Kingdom and France, although there is no evidence that Lee thought the Confederacy should base its military plans on this possibility.

While McClellan's 87,000-man Army of the Potomac was moving to intercept Lee, two Union soldiers (Cpl. Barton W. Mitchell and First Sergeant John M. Bloss of the 27th Indiana Volunteer Infantry) discovered a mislaid copy of Lee's detailed battle plans—Special Order 191—wrapped around three cigars. The order indicated that Lee had divided his army and dispersed portions geographically (to Harpers Ferry, West Virginia, and Hagerstown, Maryland), thus making each subject to isolation and defeat if McClellan could move quickly enough. McClellan waited about 18 hours before deciding to take advantage of this intelligence and reposition his forces, thus squandering an opportunity to defeat Lee decisively.

There were two significant engagements in the Maryland campaign prior to the major battle of Antietam: Major General Thomas J. "Stonewall" Jackson's capture of Harpers Ferry and McClellan's assault through the Blue Ridge Mountains in the Battle of South Mountain. The former was significant because a large portion of Lee's army was absent from the start of the battle of Antietam, attending to the surrender of the Union garrison; the latter because stout Confederate defenses at two passes through the mountains delayed McClellan's advance enough for Lee to concentrate the remainder of his army at Sharpsburg.

== Opposing forces ==
=== Union ===
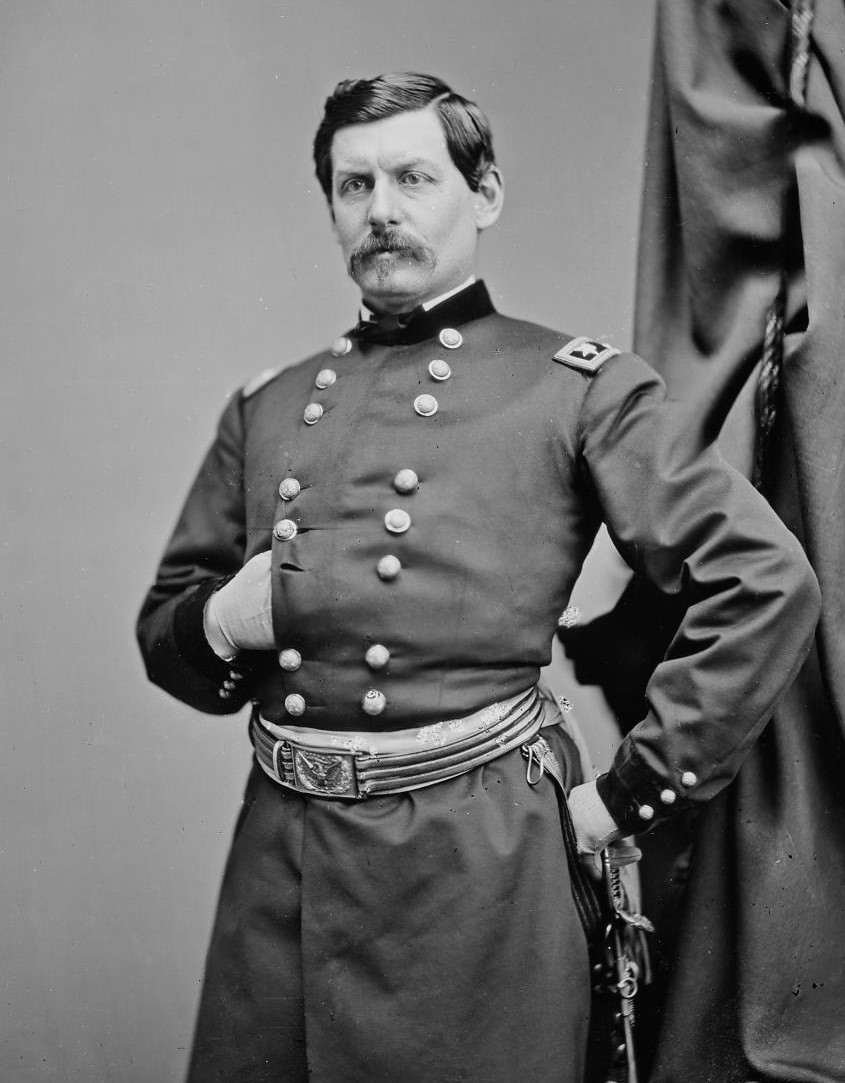
Maj. Gen. George B. McClellan, Army of the Potomac (USA)

Major General George B. McClellan's Army of the Potomac, bolstered by units absorbed from John Pope's Army of Virginia, included six infantry corps. The I Corps and XII Corps were units from Pope's force, the II Corps, V Corps, and VI Corps had fought with McClellan and the Army of the Potomac in the Peninsula campaign, and the IX Corps was a newer addition to the Army of the Potomac. The latter corps had seen action in North Carolina and a portion of it had fought with Pope. The VI Corps contingent included a division from the IV Corps. Earlier in the campaign, McClellan had assigned twenty-four new regiments of inexperienced troops to his army to bolster the strength of depleted veteran units. Of these green troops, eighteen regiments, totaling about 15,000 to 16,000 men, accompanied McClellan's army for the march to Antietam. Several thousand more new recruits were added to existing units, so about a quarter of McClellan's army was inexperienced and poorly trained entering the battle. The II, IX, and XII Corps received more of these troops than the other corps. (Note: One historian believes that the fact that nearly one fourth of McClellan's infantry had little or no training is an important point that is rarely addressed. The new troops affected mobility and combat effectiveness, and partially negated McClellan's advantage in troops that engaged.)

The I Corps was commanded by Major General Joseph Hooker and contained three divisions. The II Corps was commanded by Major General Edwin Vose Sumner, and contained three divisions. As a whole, the veteran elements of the corps had a reputation as a good fighting unit. The V Corps was commanded by Major General Fitz John Porter. Originally only one division of the corps accompanied McClellan, but a second was later released from the defenses of Washington, D.C. to accompany the Army of the Potomac. A third division of the corps reached McClellan the day of the battle. The VI Corps consisted of two divisions and the IV Corps detachment and was commanded by Major General William B. Franklin. These three divisions were positioned about a four-hour march away from McClellan's main body at the beginning of the battle. The IX Corps contained four divisions and was nominally commanded by Major General Ambrose Burnside, but Burnside temporarily commanded a wing of McClellan's army and active command passed to Major General Jesse Reno until his death at the battle of South Mountain, and then to Brigadier General Jacob D. Cox. The XII Corps was McClellan's smallest corps and contained two divisions. It was commanded by Brigadier General Joseph K. F. Mansfield, who took command only two days before the battle. McClellan's army also contained a cavalry division commanded by Brigadier General Alfred Pleasonton. A 2023 study by the historian D. Scott Hartwig estimates that McClellan had 72,199 men available for combat on September 17, with roughly 14,000 more arriving as reinforcements. Hartwig places I Corps strength at 9,582; II Corps strength at 16,475; V Corps strength at 9,476 with another 7,000 in the third division; 11,862 men in the VI Corps proper with another 7,219 men in the IV Corps detachment; 12,241 in the IX Corps; 8,020 in the XII Corps; and 4,543 in the Cavalry Division. This force was supported by 293 cannons available for duty.

=== Confederate ===
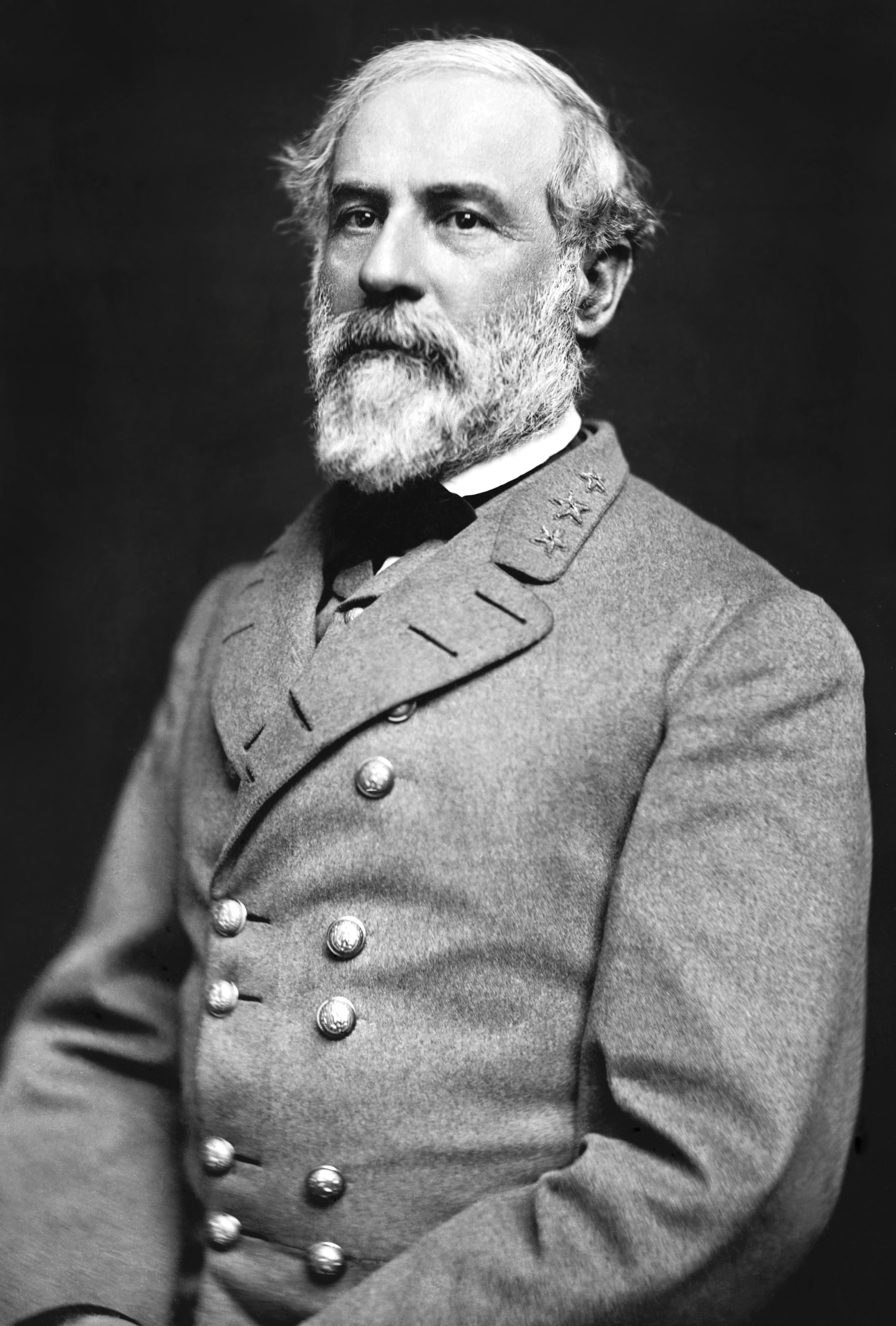
Gen. Robert E. Lee, Army of Northern Virginia (CSA)

General Lee's Army of Northern Virginia was organized into two large infantry wings, commanded by Major Generals James Longstreet and Thomas J. "Stonewall" Jackson. Longstreet's wing was numerically larger than Jackson's. This arrangement was due to Confederate law not allowing the creation of corps. Longstreet's wing contained five divisions, led by major generals Lafayette McLaws and Richard H. Anderson and brigadier generals David Rumph Jones, John G. Walker, and John Bell Hood. Jackson's wing contained four divisions, commanded by major generals Daniel Harvey (D.H.) Hill and Ambrose Powell (A.P.) Hill, and brigadier generals Alexander R. Lawton and John R. Jones. Lee also had a Cavalry Division commanded by Major General J. E. B. Stuart and a unit of reserve artillery led by Brigadier General William Nelson Pendleton. The assignment of units between the wings of Jackson and Longstreet was flexible; at Antietam the two men commanded sectors of the battlefield and divisions fought under the commander whose geographic area they were fighting in.

The Army of Northern Virginia held morale and leadership advantages over McClellan's army, but was poorly supplied, was operating in enemy territory away from its logistical lines, and was more poorly armed. Ammunition supply was made more difficult due to units being armed with mixed types of weapons, and many Confederate soldiers were still armed with smoothbore weapons of shorter range. Many of the cannons issued to the Confederate artillery were obsolete, while the Union had modern guns. The Confederates had about 246 cannon at Antietam, although the exact number of guns issued to some of the Confederate batteries is not known. Lee's army was weakened by disease, and the historian Joseph T. Glatthaar estimates that about one-third to one-half of Lee's army was absent at Antietam due to straggling. The Confederate strength at Antietam is difficult to determine; Hartwig states that a precise figure is indiscernible, but estimates a strength of about 37,600 men.

== Prelude to battle ==
=== Disposition of armies ===
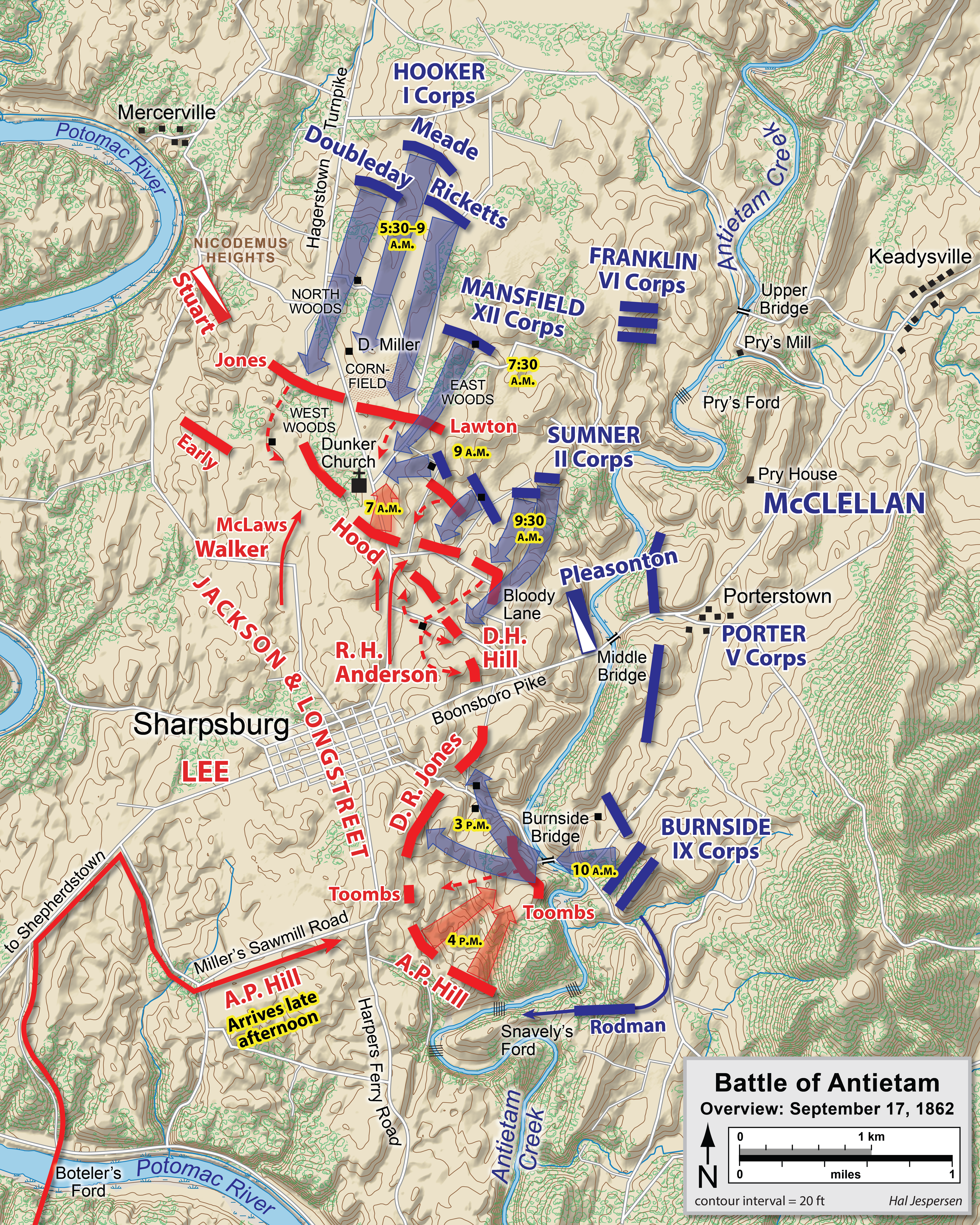
Overview of the Battle of Antietam

Near the town of Sharpsburg, Lee deployed his available forces behind Antietam Creek along a low ridge, starting on September 15. While it was an effective defensive position, it was not an impregnable one. The terrain provided excellent cover for infantrymen, with rail and stone fences, outcroppings of limestone, little hollows and swales. The creek to their front was only a minor barrier, ranging from 60 to 100 feet (18–30 m) in width, and was fordable in places and crossed by three stone bridges each a mile (1.5 km) apart. It was also a precarious position because the Confederate rear was blocked by the Potomac River and only a single crossing point, Boteler's Ford at Shepherdstown, was nearby should retreat be necessary. (The ford at Williamsport, Maryland, was 10 miles (16 km) northwest from Sharpsburg and had been used by Jackson in his march to Harpers Ferry. The disposition of Union forces during the battle made it impractical to consider retreating in that direction.) And on September 15, the force under Lee's immediate command consisted of no more than 18,000 men, only a third the size of the Federal army.

The first two Union divisions arrived on the afternoon of September 15 and the bulk of the remainder of the army late that evening. Although an immediate Union attack on the morning of September 16 would have had an overwhelming advantage in numbers, McClellan's trademark caution and his belief that Lee had as many as 100,000 men at Sharpsburg caused him to delay his attack for a day. This gave the Confederates more time to prepare defensive positions and allowed Longstreet's corps to arrive from Hagerstown and Jackson's corps, minus A.P. Hill's division, to arrive from Harpers Ferry. Jackson defended the left (northern) flank, anchored on the Potomac, Longstreet the right (southern) flank, anchored on the Antietam, a line that was about 4 miles (6 km) long. (As the battle progressed and Lee shifted units, these corps boundaries overlapped considerably.)

On the evening of September 16, McClellan ordered Hooker's I Corps to cross Antietam Creek and probe the enemy positions. Meade's division cautiously attacked Hood's troops near the East Woods. After darkness fell, artillery fire continued as McClellan positioned his troops for the next day's fighting. McClellan's plan was to overwhelm the enemy's left flank. He arrived at this decision because of the configuration of bridges over the Antietam. The lower bridge (which would soon be named Burnside Bridge) was dominated by Confederate positions on the bluffs overlooking it. The middle bridge, on the road from Boonsboro, was subject to artillery fire from the heights near Sharpsburg, but the upper bridge was 2 miles (3 km) east of the Confederate guns and could be crossed safely. McClellan planned to commit more than half his army to the assault, starting with two corps, supported by a third, and if necessary a fourth. He intended to launch a simultaneous diversionary attack against the Confederate right with a fifth corps, and he was prepared to strike the center with his reserves if either attack succeeded. The skirmish in the East Woods served to signal McClellan's intentions to Lee, who prepared his defenses accordingly. He shifted men to his left flank and sent urgent messages to his two commanders who had not yet arrived on the battlefield: Lafayette McLaws with two divisions and A.P. Hill with one division.

=== Terrain and its consequences ===
McClellan's plans were ill-coordinated and were executed poorly. He issued to each of his subordinate commanders only the orders for his own corps, not general orders describing the entire battle plan. The terrain of the battlefield made it difficult for those commanders to monitor events outside of their sectors. Moreover, McClellan's headquarters were more than a mile in the rear (at the Philip Pry house, east of the creek). This made it difficult for him to control the separate corps. This is why the battle progressed the next day as essentially three separate, mostly uncoordinated battles: morning in the northern end of the battlefield, midday in the center, and afternoon in the south. This lack of coordination and concentration of McClellan's forces almost completely nullified the two-to-one advantage the Union enjoyed. It also allowed Lee to shift his defensive forces to meet each offensive.

== Battle ==
=== Morning phase ===
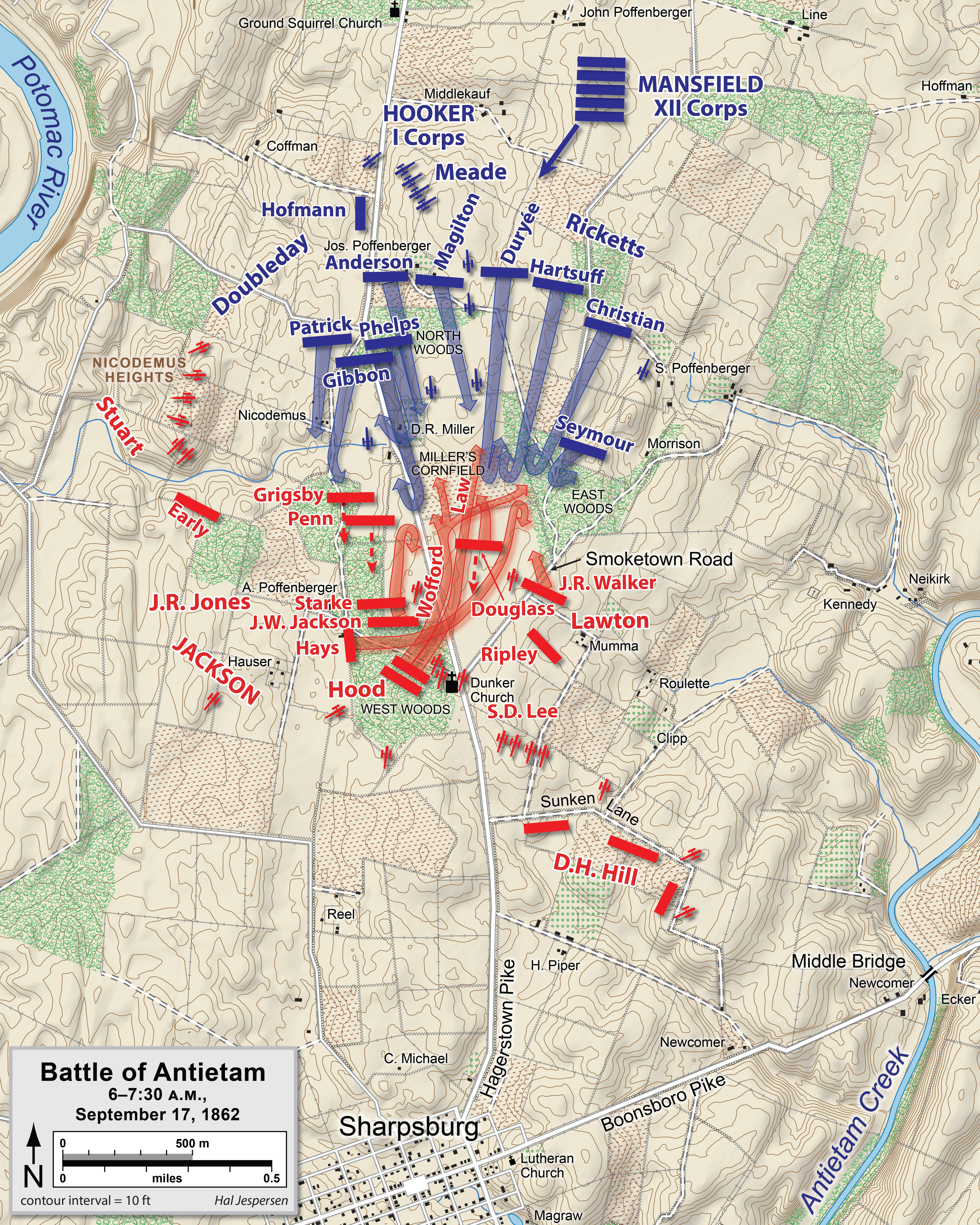
Assaults by Hooker's I Corps, 5:30 to 7:30 a.m.

==== Hooker and Hood attack ====
The battle opened at dawn (about 5:30 a.m.) on September 17 with an attack down the Hagerstown Turnpike by the Union I Corps under Joseph Hooker. Hooker's objective was the plateau on which sat the Dunker Church, a modest whitewashed building belonging to a congregation of German Baptist Brethren. Hooker had approximately 8,600 men, little more than the 7,700 defenders under Stonewall Jackson, and this slight disparity was more than offset by the Confederates' strong defensive positions. Abner Doubleday's division moved on Hooker's right, James Ricketts's moved on the left into the East Woods, and George Meade's Pennsylvania Reserves division deployed in the center and slightly to the rear. Jackson's defense consisted of the divisions under Alexander Lawton and John R. Jones in line from the West Woods, across the Turnpike, and along the southern end of Miller's Cornfield. Four brigades were held in reserve inside the West Woods.

As the first Union men emerged from the North Woods and into the Cornfield, an artillery duel erupted. Confederate fire was from the horse artillery batteries under Jeb Stuart to the west and four batteries under Colonel Stephen D. Lee on the high ground across the pike from the Dunker Church to the south. Union return fire was from nine batteries on the ridge behind the North Woods and twenty 20-pounder Parrott rifles, 2 miles (3 km) east of Antietam Creek. The conflagration caused heavy casualties on both sides and was described by Colonel Lee as "artillery Hell."

Seeing the glint of Confederate bayonets concealed in the Cornfield, Hooker halted his infantry and brought up four batteries of artillery, which fired shell and canister over the heads of the Federal infantry into the field. A battle began, with considerable melee action with rifle butts and bayonets due to short visibility in the corn. Officers rode about cursing and yelling orders no one could hear in the noise. Rifles became hot and fouled from too much firing; the air was filled with a hail of bullets and shells.

Meade's 1st Brigade of Pennsylvanians, under Brigadier General Truman Seymour, began advancing through the East Woods and exchanged fire with Colonel James Walker's brigade of Alabama, Georgia, and North Carolina troops. As Walker's men forced Seymour's back, aided by Lee's artillery fire, Ricketts's division entered the Cornfield, also to be torn up by artillery. Brigadier General Abram Duryée's brigade marched directly into volleys from Colonel Marcellus Douglass's Georgia brigade. Enduring heavy fire from a range of 250 yards (230 m) and gaining no advantage because of a lack of reinforcements, Duryée ordered a withdrawal.

On the attack by the Louisiana Tigers at the Cornfield: "...the most deadly fire of the war. Rifles are shot to pieces in the hands of the soldiers, canteens and haversacks are riddled with bullets, the dead and wounded go down in scores."

— Capt. Benjamin F. Cook, of the
12th Massachusetts Infantry

The reinforcements that Duryée had expected—brigades under Brigadier General George L. Hartsuff and Colonel William H. Christian—had difficulties reaching the scene. Hartsuff was wounded by a shell, and Christian dismounted and fled to the rear in terror. When the men were rallied and advanced into the Cornfield, they met the same artillery and infantry fire as their predecessors. As the superior Union numbers began to tell, the Louisiana "Tiger" Brigade under Harry Hays entered the fray and forced the Union men back to the East Woods. The casualties received by the 12th Massachusetts Infantry, 67%, were the highest of any unit that day. The Tigers were beaten back eventually when the Federals deployed an artillery battery in the Cornfield. Point-blank fire slaughtered the Tigers, who lost 323 of their 500 men.

While the Cornfield remained a bloody stalemate, Federal advances a few hundred yards to the west were more successful. Brigadier General John Gibbon's 4th Brigade of Doubleday's division (recently named the Iron Brigade) began advancing down and astride the turnpike, into the cornfield, and in the West Woods, pushing aside Jackson's men. They were halted by a charge of 1,150 men from Starke's brigade, leveling heavy fire from 30 yards (30 m) away. The Confederate brigade withdrew after being exposed to fierce return fire from the Iron Brigade, and Starke was mortally wounded. The Union advance on the Dunker Church resumed and cut a large gap in Jackson's defensive line, which teetered near collapse. Although the cost was steep, Hooker's corps was making steady progress.

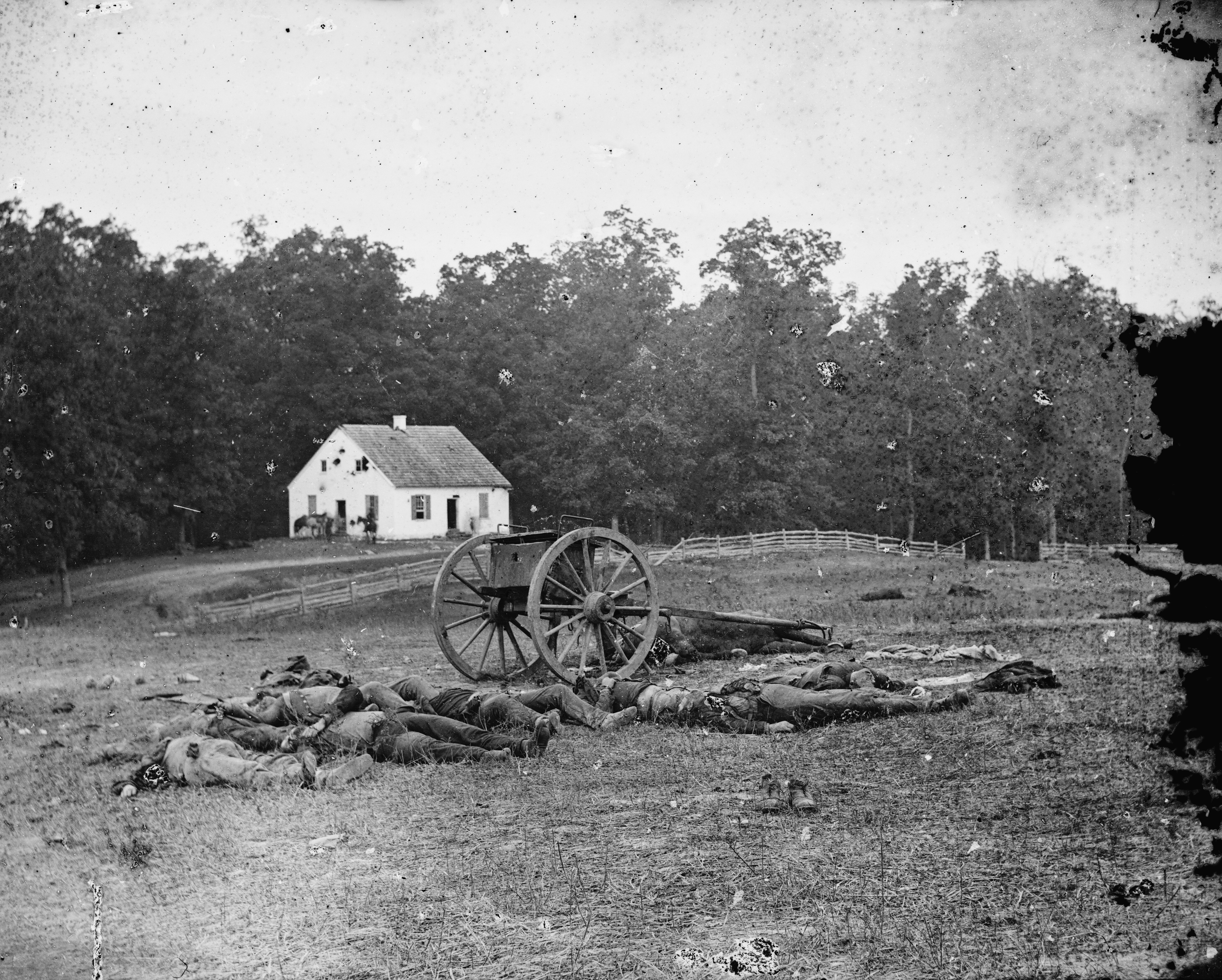
Dead soldiers near the Dunker Church

Confederate reinforcements arrived just after 7 a.m. The divisions under McLaws and Richard H. Anderson arrived following a night march from Harpers Ferry. Around 7:15, General Lee moved George T. Anderson's Georgia brigade from the right flank of the army to aid Jackson. At 7 a.m., Hood's division of 2,300 men advanced through the West Woods and pushed the Union troops back through the Cornfield again. They were aided by three brigades of D.H. Hill's division arriving from the Mumma Farm, southeast of the Cornfield, and by Jubal Early's brigade, pushing through the West Woods from the Nicodemus Farm, where they had been supporting Jeb Stuart's horse artillery. Some officers of the Iron Brigade rallied men around the artillery pieces of Battery B, 4th U.S. Artillery, and Gibbon himself saw to it that his previous unit did not lose a single caisson. Hood's men bore the brunt of the fighting, however, and paid a heavy price—60% casualties—but they were able to prevent the defensive line from crumbling and held off the I Corps. When asked by a fellow officer where his division was, Hood replied, "Dead on the field."

==== Mansfield and Sedgwick ====
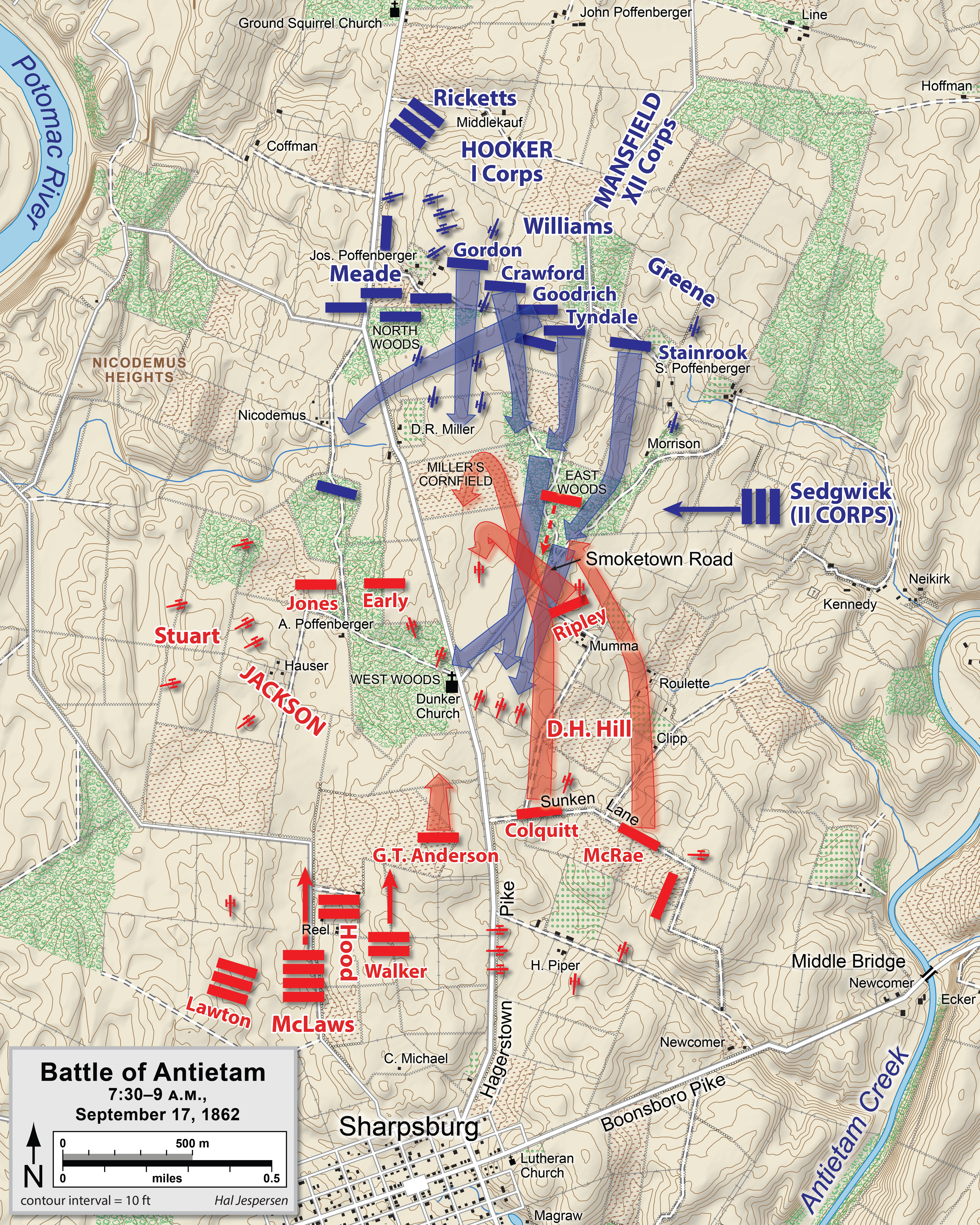
Assaults by Mansfield's XII Corps, 7:30 to 9:00 a.m.

Hooker's men had also paid heavily but without achieving their objectives. After two hours and 2,500 casualties, they were back where they started. The Cornfield, an area about 250 yards (230 m) deep and 400 yards (370 m) wide, was a scene of indescribable destruction. It was estimated that the Cornfield changed hands no fewer than 15 times in the course of the morning. Maj. Rufus Dawes, who assumed command of Iron Brigade's 6th Wisconsin Regiment during the battle, later compared the fighting around the Hagerstown Turnpike with the stone wall at Fredericksburg, Spotsylvania's "Bloody Angle", and the slaughter pen of Cold Harbor, insisting that "the Antietam Turnpike surpassed them all in manifest evidence of slaughter." Hooker was reinforced by the 7,200 infantrymen of Mansfield's XII Corps, which had been held in a loosely defined reserve role.

Half of Mansfield's men were raw recruits, and Mansfield was also inexperienced, having taken command only two days before. Although he was a veteran of 40 years' service, he had never led large numbers of soldiers in combat. Concerned that his men would bolt under fire, he marched them in a formation that was known as "column of companies, closed in mass," a bunched-up formation in which a regiment was arrayed ten ranks deep instead of the normal two. As his men entered the East Woods, they presented an excellent artillery target, "almost as good a target as a barn." Mansfield himself was shot in the chest and died the next day. Alpheus Williams assumed temporary command of the XII Corps.

The new recruits of Mansfield's 1st Division made no progress against Hood's line, which was reinforced by brigades of D. H. Hill's division under Colquitt and McRae. The 2nd Division of the XII Corps, under George Sears Greene, however, broke through McRae's men, who fled under the mistaken belief that they were about to be trapped by a flanking attack. This breach of the line forced Hood and his men, outnumbered, to regroup in the West Woods, where they had started the day. Greene was able to reach the vicinity of Dunker Church, and drove off Stephen Lee's batteries.

... every stalk of corn in the northern and greater part of the field was cut as closely as could have been done with a knife, and the [Confederates] slain lay in rows precisely as they had stood in their ranks a few moments before.

— Major General Joseph Hooker
Commander of I Corps (Union army)

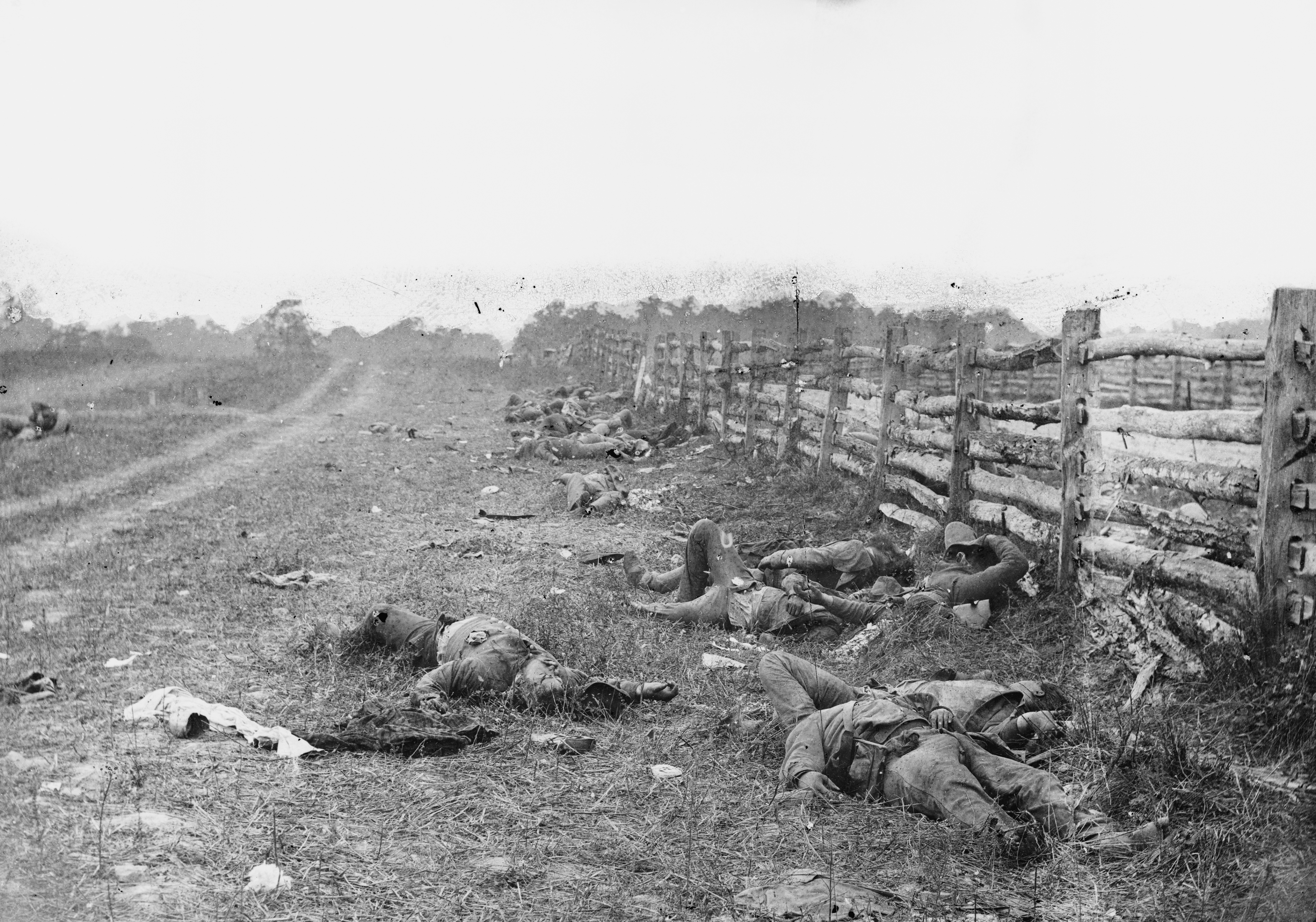
Dead Confederate soldiers from Starke's Louisiana Brigade, on the Hagerstown Turnpike, north of the Dunker Church. Photograph by Alexander Gardner

Hooker attempted to coordinate the assault, but a Confederate sharpshooter spotted the general and his white horse and shot Hooker through the foot. Command of his I Corps was assigned to Meade by Hooker. Ricketts had seniority over Meade, but McClellan backed Hooker's decision to place Meade in command of the corps. With Hooker removed from the field, there was no general left with the authority to coordinate the remaining troops on the field.

In an effort to turn the Confederate left flank and relieve the pressure on Mansfield's men, Sumner's II Corps was ordered at 7:20 a.m. to send two divisions into battle. Sedgwick's division of 5,400 men was the first to ford Antietam Creek, and they entered the East Woods with the intention of turning left and forcing the Confederates south into the assault of Ambrose Burnside's IX Corps. However, the plan went awry. They became separated from William H. French's division, and at 9 a.m. Sumner, who was accompanying the division, launched the attack with an unusual battle formation—the three brigades in three long lines, men side-by-side, with only 50 to 70 yards (60 m) separating the lines. They were assaulted first by Confederate artillery and then from three sides by the divisions of Early, Walker, and McLaws, and in less than half an hour Sedgwick's men were forced to retreat in great disorder to their starting point with over 2,200 casualties, including Sedgwick himself, who was taken out of action for several months by a wound. Sumner has been condemned by most historians for his "reckless" attack, his lack of coordination with the I and XII Corps headquarters, losing control of French's division when he accompanied Sedgwick's, failing to perform adequate reconnaissance before launching his attack, and selecting the unusual battle formation that was so effectively flanked by the Confederate counterattack. Historian M. V. Armstrong's recent scholarship, however, has determined that Sumner did perform appropriate reconnaissance and his decision to attack where he did was justified by the information available to him.

At around 9:45 a.m., Williams was tasked with reinforcing Sumner, and he sent two XII Corps regiments towards the Hagerstown Turnpike. The two regiments were confronted by the division of John G. Walker, newly arrived from the Confederate right. Walker's men repulsed the two Union regiments, and one of the Confederate brigades, commanded by Colonel Van H. Manning, attacked Greene's position near the Dunker Church around 10 a.m. After repulsing Manning's brigade, Greene's soldiers counterattacked into the West Woods. The fighting died down around the Dunker Church, and shifted towards Lee's center. The morning phase ended with casualties on both sides of almost 13,000, including two Union corps commanders.

=== Midday phase ===
==== Opening assaults on the Sunken Road ====
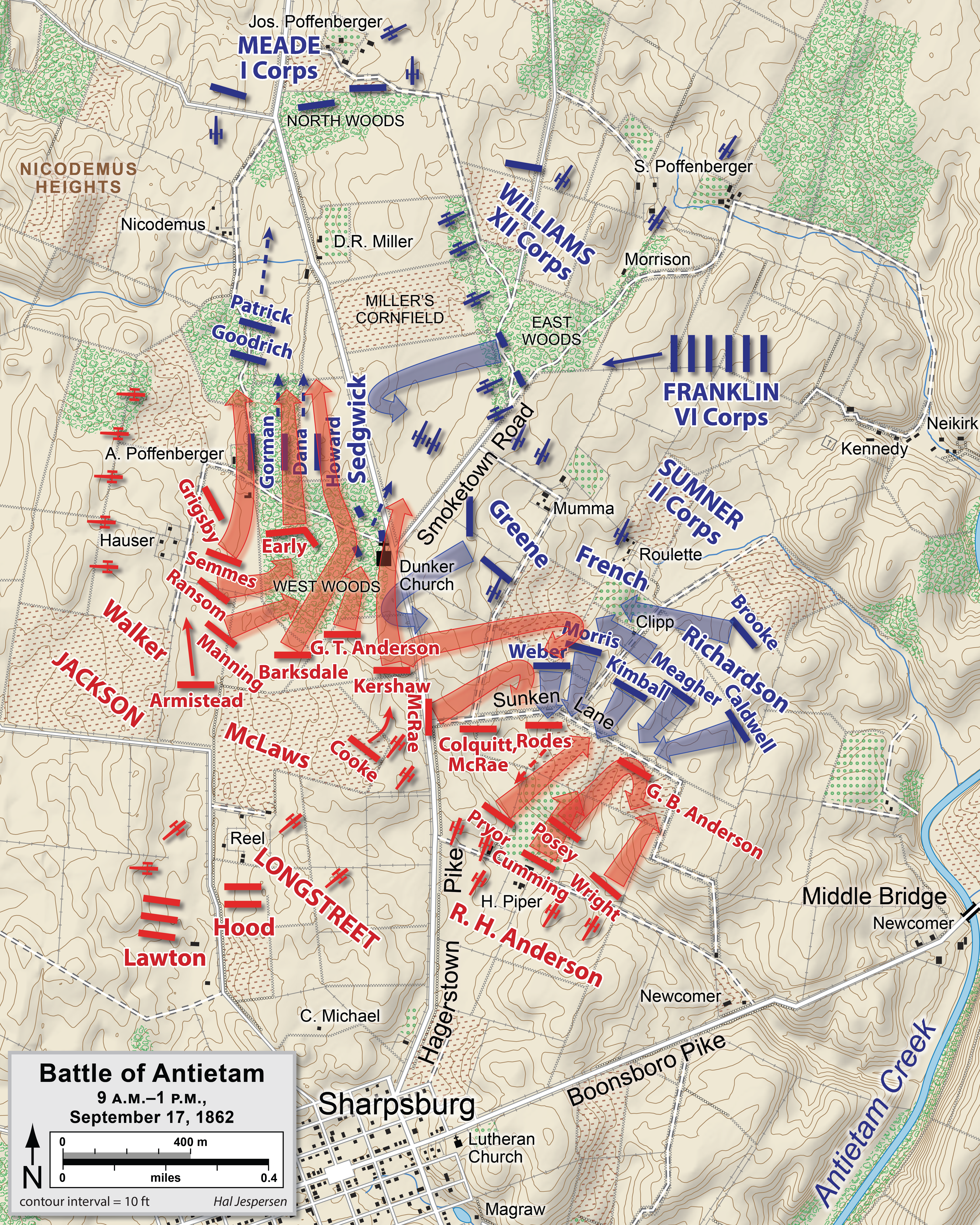
Assaults by Mansfield/William's XII Corps and Sumner's II Corps, 9 a.m. to 1 p.m.

By midday, the action had shifted to the center of the Confederate line. Sumner had accompanied the morning attack of Sedgwick's division, but another of his divisions, under French, lost contact with Sumner and Sedgwick and inexplicably headed south. Eager for an opportunity to see combat, French found skirmishers in his path and ordered his men forward. By this time, Sumner's aide (and son) located French, described the terrible fighting in the West Woods and relayed an order for him to divert Confederate attention by attacking their center.

French confronted D.H. Hill's division. Hill commanded about 2,500 men, less than half the number under French, and three of his five brigades had been torn up during the morning combat. This sector of Longstreet's line was theoretically the weakest. Hill's men, however, were in a strong defensive position, atop a gradual ridge, in a sunken road worn down by years of wagon traffic, which formed a natural trench.

French launched a series of brigade-sized assaults against Hill's improvised breastworks at around 9:30 a.m.. The first brigade to attack, mostly inexperienced troops commanded by Brigadier General Max Weber, was quickly cut down by heavy rifle fire; neither side deployed artillery at this point. The second attack, more raw recruits under Colonel Dwight Morris, was also subjected to heavy fire, but managed to beat back a counterattack by the Alabama Brigade of Robert Rodes. The third, under Brigadier General Nathan Kimball, included three veteran regiments, but they also fell to fire from the sunken road. French's division suffered 1,750 casualties (of his 5,700 men) in under an hour.

Reinforcements were arriving on both sides, and by 10:30 a.m. Robert E. Lee sent his final reserve division—some 3,400 men under Major General Richard H. Anderson—to bolster Hill's line and extend it to the right, preparing an attack that would envelop French's left flank. But at the same time, the 4,000 men of Major General Israel B. Richardson's division arrived on French's left. This was the last of Sumner's three divisions, which had been held up in the rear by McClellan as he organized his reserve forces.

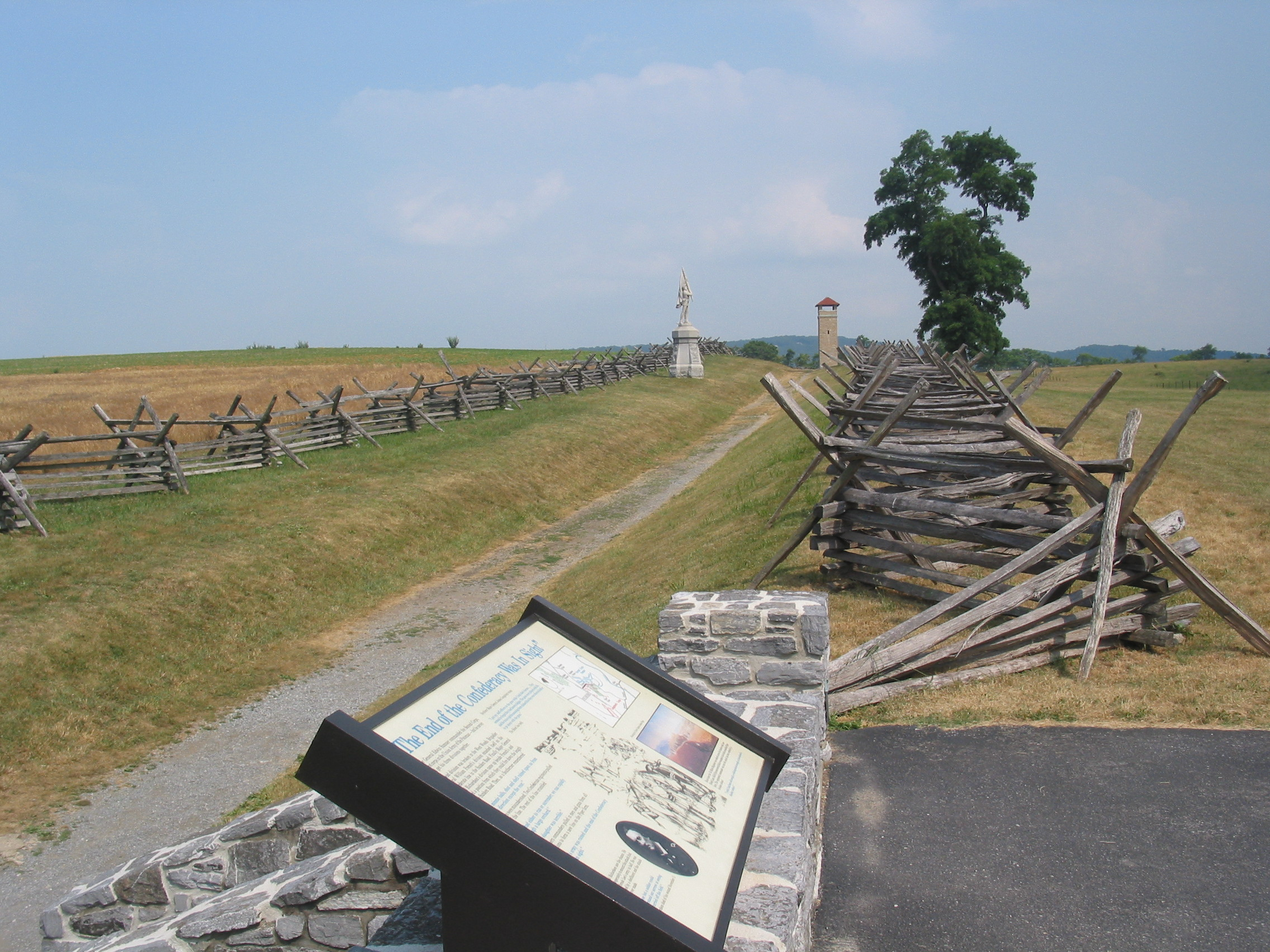
The sunken road in 2005

Leading off the fourth attack of the day against the sunken road was the Irish Brigade of Brigadier General Thomas F. Meagher. As they advanced with emerald green flags snapping in the breeze, a regimental chaplain, Father William Corby, rode back and forth across the front of the formation shouting words of conditional absolution prescribed by the Roman Catholic Church for those who were about to die. The mostly Irish immigrants lost 540 men to heavy volleys before they were ordered to withdraw.

General Richardson personally dispatched the brigade of Brigadier General John C. Caldwell into battle around noon (after being told that Caldwell was in the rear, behind a haystack), and finally the tide turned. Anderson's Confederate division had been little help to the defenders after General Anderson was wounded early in the fighting. Other key leaders were lost as well, including George B. Anderson (no relation; Anderson's successor, Colonel Charles C. Tew of the 2nd North Carolina, was killed minutes after assuming command) and Colonel John B. Gordon of the 6th Alabama. (Note: Gordon received five serious wounds in the fight; twice in his right leg, twice in the left arm, and once in the face. He lay unconscious, face down in his cap, and later told colleagues that he should have smothered in his own blood, except for the act of an unidentified Yankee, who had earlier shot a hole in his cap, which allowed the blood to drain.) The Confederate command structure was becoming disorganized.

==== Collapse of the Sunken Road ====
We were shooting them like sheep in a pen. If a bullet missed the mark at first it was liable to strike the further bank, angle back, and take them secondarily.

— Unknown sergeant
61st New York Infantry

As Caldwell's brigade advanced around the right flank of the Confederates, Colonel Francis C. Barlow led the 61st and 64th New York forward. Barlow and Lieutenant Colonel Nelson Miles saw a weak point in the line and maneuvered their troops into a position that allowed them to pour enfilade fire into the Confederate line, turning it into a deadly trap. In attempting to wheel around to meet this threat, a command from Rodes was misunderstood by Lt. Colonel James N. Lightfoot, who had succeeded Gordon. Lightfoot ordered his men to about-face and march away, an order that all five regiments of the brigade thought applied to them as well. Confederate troops streamed toward Sharpsburg, their line lost. Most of George Anderson's brigade withdrew as well, caught up in the retreat of Richard Anderson's division.

Richardson's men were in hot pursuit when massed artillery hastily assembled by General Longstreet drove them back. A counterattack with 200 men led by D.H. Hill got around the Federal left flank near the sunken road, and although they were driven back by a fierce charge of the 5th New Hampshire, this stemmed the collapse of the center. Reluctantly, Richardson ordered his division to fall back to north of the ridge facing the sunken road. His division lost about 1,000 men. Colonel Barlow was severely wounded, and Richardson mortally wounded. Winfield S. Hancock assumed division command. Although Hancock would have an excellent future reputation as an aggressive division and corps commander, the unexpected change of command sapped the momentum of the Federal advance.

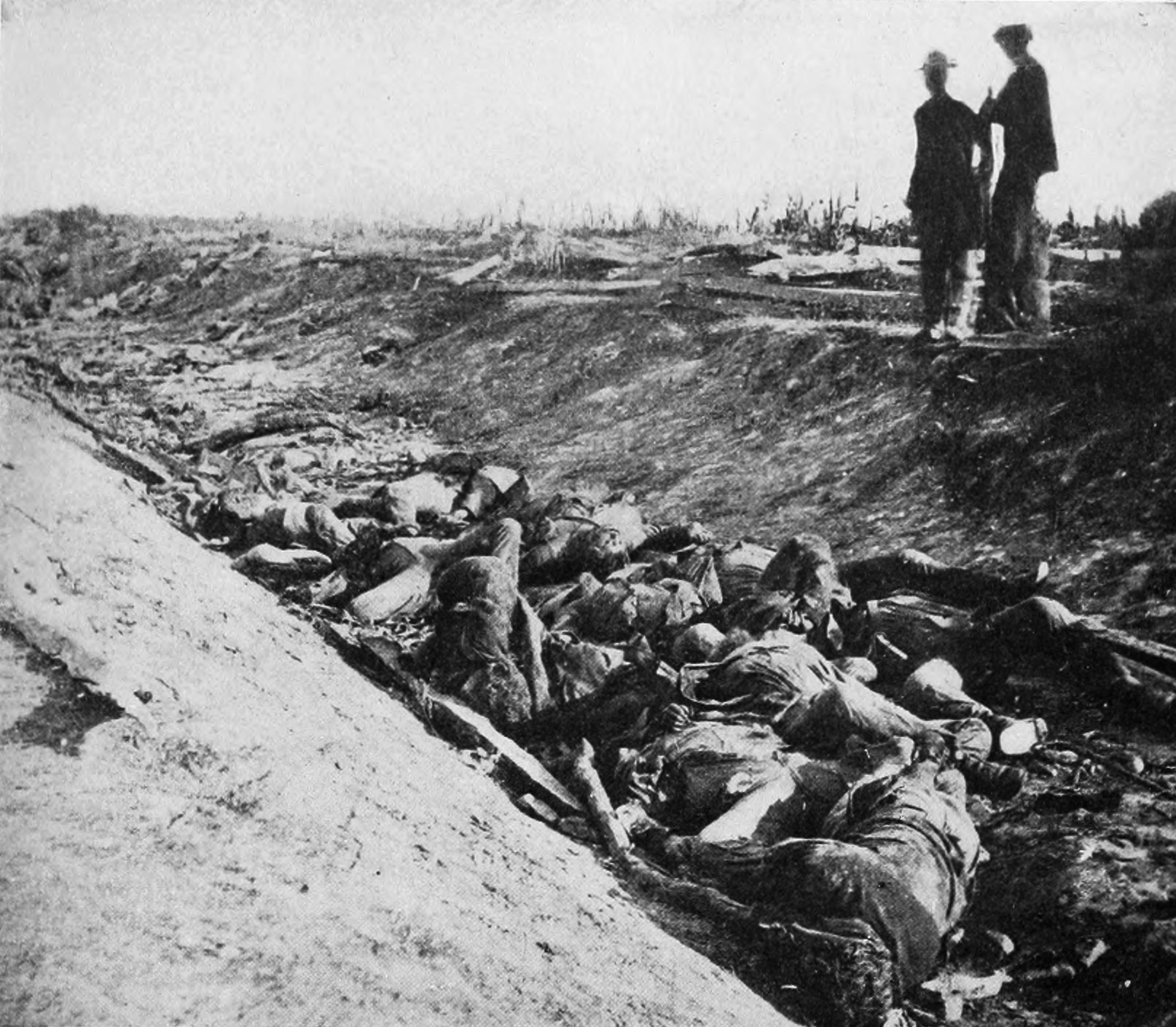
Confederate dead lie in the "Bloody Lane" after the Battle of Antietam, 1862

The carnage from 9:30 a.m. to 1:00 p.m. on the sunken road gave it the name Bloody Lane, leaving about 5,600 casualties (Union 3,000, Confederate 2,600) along the 800-yard (700 m) road. And yet, a great opportunity presented itself. If this broken sector of the Confederate line were exploited, Lee's army would be divided in half and possibly defeated. There were ample forces available to do so. There was a reserve of 3,500 cavalry and the 10,300 infantrymen of General Porter's V Corps, waiting near the middle bridge, a mile away. The VI Corps, under Major General William B. Franklin, had just arrived with 12,000 men. The Rebels, under Manning, had made a second assault on the high ground to the left (held by Greene) overlooking the road that temporarily around noon, but Smith's Division of VI Corps recaptured it. Franklin was ready to exploit this breakthrough, but Sumner, the senior corps commander, ordered him not to advance. Franklin appealed to McClellan, who left his headquarters in the rear to hear both arguments but backed Sumner's decision, ordering Franklin and Hancock to hold their positions. McClellan never lost this ground for the remainder of the battle and eventually had amassed 44 guns on it.

After the war, the story spread that later in the day, the commander of the other reserve unit near the center, the V Corps, Major General Fitz John Porter, heard recommendations from Major General George Sykes, commanding his 2nd Division, that another attack be made in the center, where V Corps skirmishers were driving weak Confederate defenses on Cemetery Hill, an idea that intrigued McClellan. However, Porter is said to have told McClellan, "Remember, General! I command the last reserve of the last Army of the Republic", a statement which it is claimed caused McClellan to abandon thoughts of an attack in the center. While the Union skirmisher operations in the center were showing promise of a major breakthrough and were called off, Porter's alledged statement is likely a fiction, and his role in the lost opportunity at the center has been embellished. The historian D. Scott Hartwig concludes that while Porter "was not in favor of sending more troops across [Antietam Creek], he did not discourage using those already on the other side of it to support a push toward Cemetery Hill", although Hartwig believes that Porter does ultimately bear some of the responsibility for the missed opportunity. The tale may partially be a misremembering of a later conversation regarding sending reinforcements to Burnside.

=== Afternoon phase ===
==== Burnside's Bridge ====
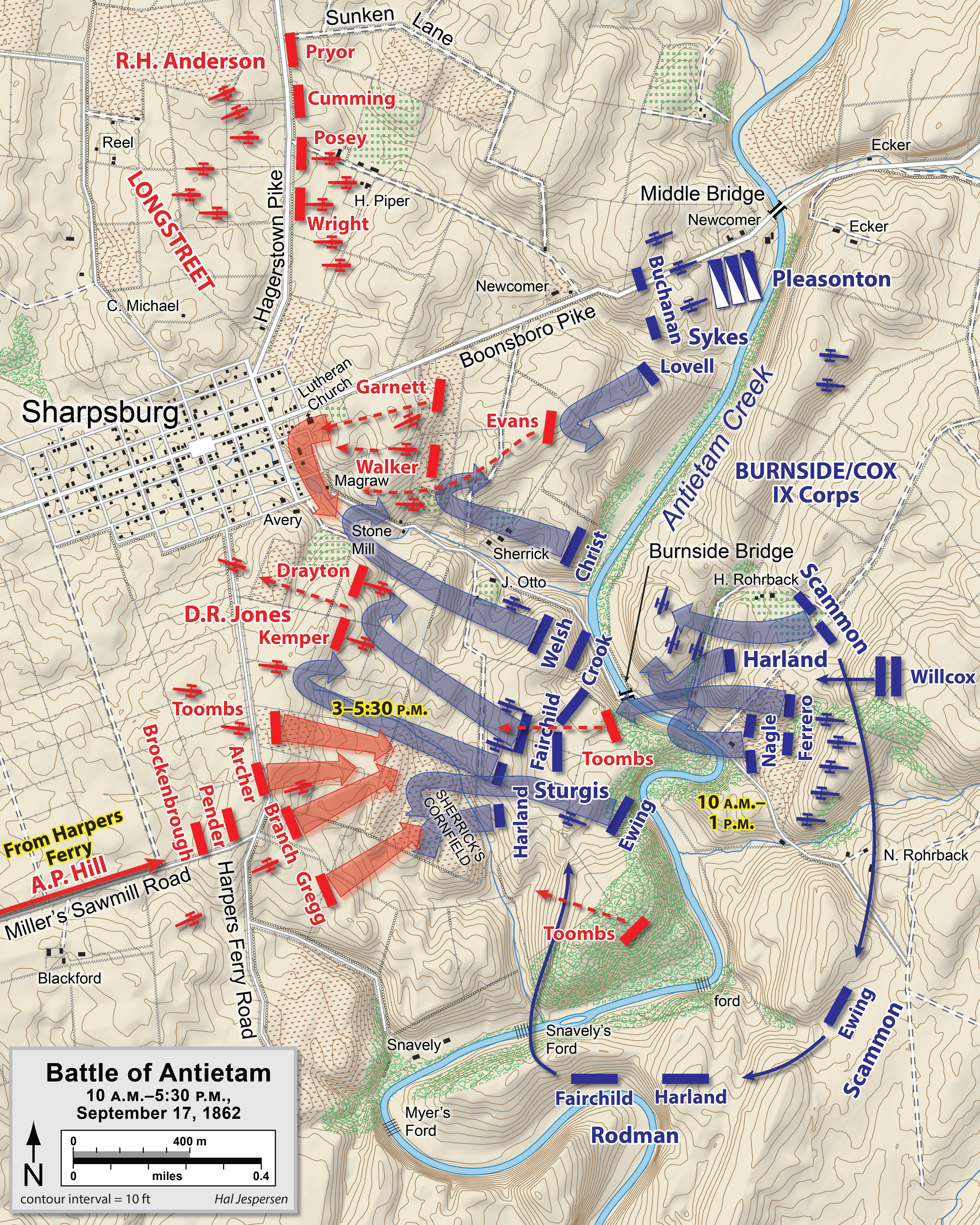
Assaults by Burnside's IX Corps, 10 a.m. to 4:30 p.m.

The action moved to the southern end of the battlefield. McClellan's plan called for Major General Ambrose Burnside and the IX Corps to conduct a diversionary attack in support of Hooker's I Corps, hoping to draw Confederate attention away from the intended main attack in the north. However, Burnside was instructed to wait for explicit orders before launching his attack, and those orders did not reach him until 10 a.m. Burnside was largely passive during preparations for the battle. The IX Corps had a clumsy command structure - Burnside had earlier commanded one wing of the Union army, composed of the I and IX Corps. Despite the I Corps being detached from Burnside's control, he still acted as if he were a wing commander. Orders for the IX Corps went to Burnside, who then passed them on directly to Jacob Cox. Cox had assumed temporary command of the corps after the death of Reno at South Mountain.

Burnside had four divisions (12,500 troops) and 50 guns east of Antietam Creek. Facing him was a force that had been greatly depleted by Lee's movement of units to bolster the Confederate left flank. At dawn, the divisions of Brig. Gens. David R. Jones and John G. Walker stood in defense, but by 10 a.m. all of Walker's men and Colonel George T. Anderson's Georgia brigade had been removed. Jones had only about 3,000 men and 12 guns available to meet Burnside. Four thin brigades guarded the ridges near Sharpsburg, primarily a low plateau known as Cemetery Hill. The remaining 400 men—the 2nd and 20th Georgia regiments, under the command of Brigadier General Robert Toombs, with two artillery batteries—defended Rohrbach's Bridge, a three-span, 125-foot (38 m) stone structure that was the southernmost crossing of the Antietam. It would become known to history as Burnside's Bridge because of the notoriety of the coming battle. The bridge was a difficult objective. The main road leading to it was exposed to enemy fire, but a farm lane allowed a more protected approach to around 250 yards (230 m) from the bridge. The bridge was dominated by a steep bluff on the west bank, and trees and an old quarry provided cover for defenders. The Confederates also strengthened their position with breastworks made from logs and fence rails.

Go and look at [Burnside's Bridge], and tell me if you don't think Burnside and his corps might have executed a hop, skip, and jump and landed on the other side. One thing is certain, they might have waded it that day without getting their waist belts wet in any place.

— Confederate staff officer Henry Kyd Douglas

Historians question why Burnside spent so much time at the bridge on Antietam Creek when the creek could have been forded "at a variety of places out of enemy range". The commanding terrain across the sometimes shallow creek made crossing the water a comparatively easy part of a difficult problem. Burnside concentrated his plan instead on storming the bridge while simultaneously crossing a ford McClellan's engineers had identified a half mile (1 km) downstream, but when Burnside's men reached it, they found the banks too high to negotiate. While Colonel George Crook's Ohio brigade prepared to attack the bridge with the support of Brigadier General Samuel Sturgis's division, the rest of the Kanawha Division and Brigadier General Isaac Rodman's division struggled through thick brush trying to locate Snavely's Ford, 2 miles (3 km) downstream, intending to flank the Confederates.

Crook's assault on the bridge was led by skirmishers from the 11th Connecticut, who were ordered to clear the bridge for the Ohioans to cross and assault the bluff. After receiving punishing fire for 15 minutes, the Connecticut men withdrew with 139 casualties, one-third of their strength, including their commander, Colonel Henry W. Kingsbury, who was fatally wounded. Crook's main assault went awry when his unfamiliarity with the terrain caused his men to reach the creek a quarter mile (400 m) upstream from the bridge, where they exchanged volleys with Confederate skirmishers for the next few hours.

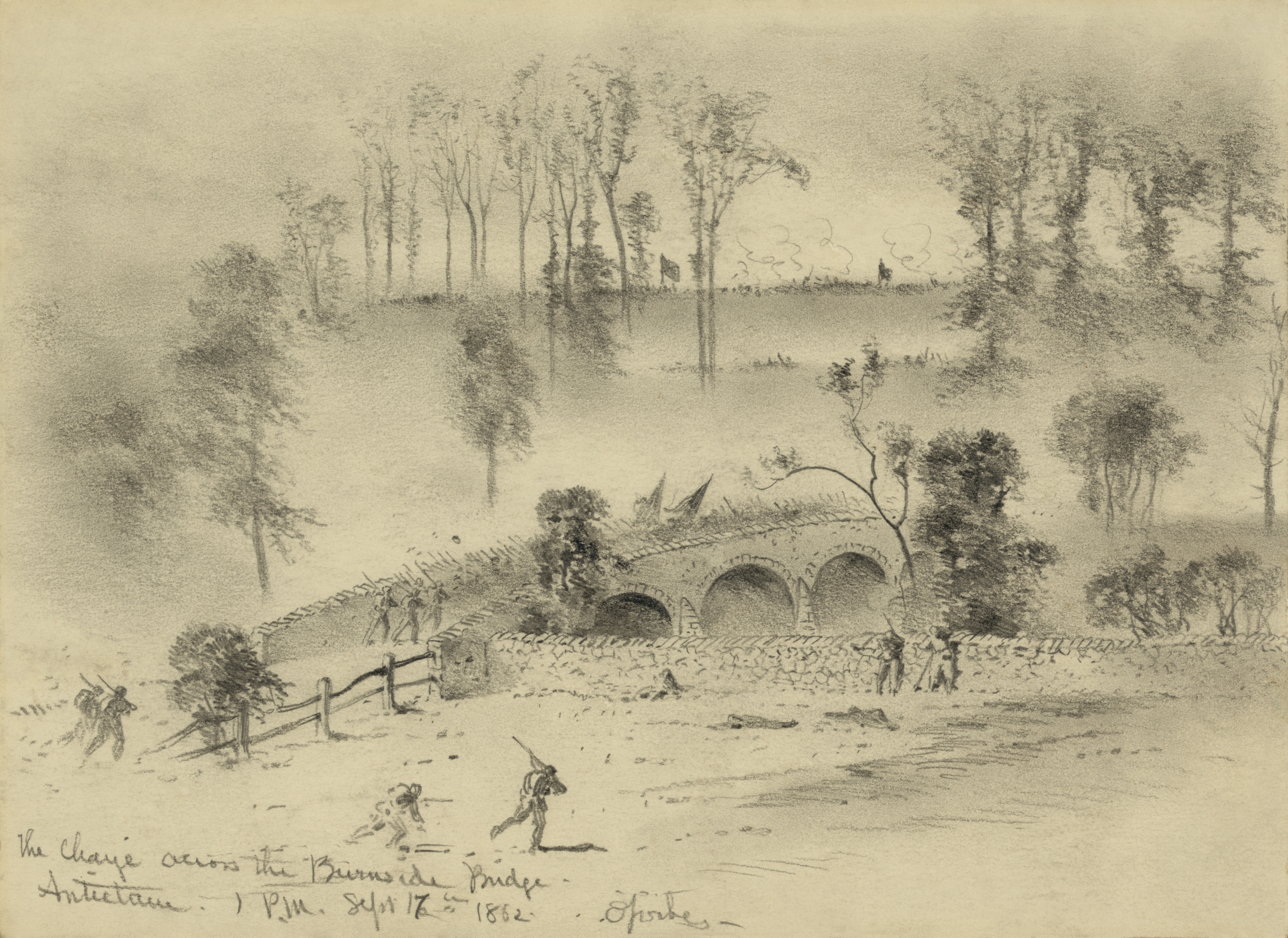
Charge of the 51st New York and 51st Pennsylvania across Burnside's Bridge by Edwin Forbes

While Rodman's division was out of touch, slogging toward Snavely's Ford, Burnside and Cox directed a second assault at the bridge by one of Sturgis's brigades, led by the 2nd Maryland and 6th New Hampshire. They also fell prey to the Confederate sharpshooters and artillery, and their attack fell apart. By this time it was noon, and McClellan was losing patience. He sent a succession of couriers to motivate Burnside to move forward. He ordered one aide, "Tell him if it costs 10,000 men he must go now." He increased the pressure by sending his inspector general, Colonel Delos B. Sackett, to confront Burnside, who reacted indignantly: "McClellan appears to think I am not trying my best to carry this bridge; you are the third or fourth one who has been to me this morning with similar orders."

The third attempt to take the bridge was at 12:30 p.m. by Sturgis's other brigade, commanded by Brigadier General Edward Ferrero. It was led by the 51st New York and the 51st Pennsylvania, who, with adequate artillery support and a promise that a recently canceled whiskey ration would be restored if they were successful, charged downhill and took up positions on the east bank. Maneuvering a captured light howitzer into position, they fired double canister down the bridge and got within 25 yards (23 m) of the enemy. By 1 p.m., Confederate ammunition was running low, and word reached Toombs that Rodman's men were crossing Snavely's Ford on their flank. He ordered a withdrawal. His Georgians had cost the Federals more than 500 casualties, giving up fewer than 160 themselves. And they had stalled Burnside's assault on the southern flank for more than three hours.

==== A. P. Hill arrives ====
Burnside's assault stalled again on its own. His officers had neglected to transport ammunition across the bridge, which was itself becoming a bottleneck for soldiers, artillery, and wagons. This represented another two-hour delay. General Lee used this time to bolster his right flank. He ordered up every available artillery unit, although he made no attempt to strengthen D.R. Jones's badly outnumbered force with infantry units from the left. Instead, he counted on the arrival of A.P. Hill's Light Division, currently embarked on an exhausting 17 mile (27 km) march from Harpers Ferry. By 2 p.m., Hill's men had reached Boteler's Ford, and Hill was able to confer with the relieved Lee at 2:30, who ordered him to bring up his men to the right of Jones.

The Federals were completely unaware that 3,000 new men would be facing them. Burnside's plan was to move around the weakened Confederate right flank, converge on Sharpsburg, and cut Lee's army off from Boteler's Ford, their only escape route across the Potomac. At 3 p.m., Burnside left Sturgis's division in reserve on the west bank and moved west with over 8,000 troops (most of them fresh) and 22 guns for close support.

An initial assault led by the 79th New York "Cameron Highlanders" succeeded against Jones's outnumbered division, which was pushed back past Cemetery Hill and to within 200 yards (200 m) of Sharpsburg. Farther to the Union left, Rodman's division advanced toward Harpers Ferry Road. Its lead brigade, under Colonel Harrison Fairchild, containing several colorful Zouaves of the 9th New York, commanded by Colonel Rush Hawkins, came under heavy shellfire from a dozen enemy guns mounted on a ridge to their front, but they kept pushing forward. There was panic in the streets of Sharpsburg, clogged with retreating Confederates. Of the five brigades in Jones's division, only Toombs's brigade was still intact, but he had only 700 men.

A. P. Hill's division arrived at 3:30 p.m. Hill divided his column, with two brigades moving southeast to guard his flank and the other three, about 2,000 men, moving to the right of Toombs's brigade and preparing for a counterattack. At 3:40 p.m., Brigadier General Maxcy Gregg's brigade of South Carolinians attacked the 16th Connecticut on Rodman's left flank in the cornfield of farmer John Otto. The Connecticut men had been in service for only three weeks, and their line disintegrated with 185 casualties. The 4th Rhode Island came up on the right, but they had poor visibility amid the high stalks of corn, and they were disoriented because many of the Confederates were wearing Union uniforms captured at Harpers Ferry. They also broke and ran, leaving the 8th Connecticut far out in advance and isolated. They were enveloped and driven down the hills toward Antietam Creek. A counterattack by regiments from the Kanawha Division fell short.

The IX Corps had suffered casualties of about 20% but still possessed twice the number of Confederates confronting them. Unnerved by the collapse of his flank, Burnside ordered his men all the way back to the west bank of the Antietam, where he urgently requested more men and guns. McClellan was able to provide just one battery. He said, "I can do nothing more. I have no infantry." In fact, however, McClellan had two fresh corps in reserve, Porter's V and Franklin's VI, but he was too cautious, concerned he was greatly outnumbered and that a massive counterstrike by Lee was imminent. Burnside's men spent the rest of the day guarding the bridge they had suffered so much to capture.

== Aftermath ==
=== Casualties ===
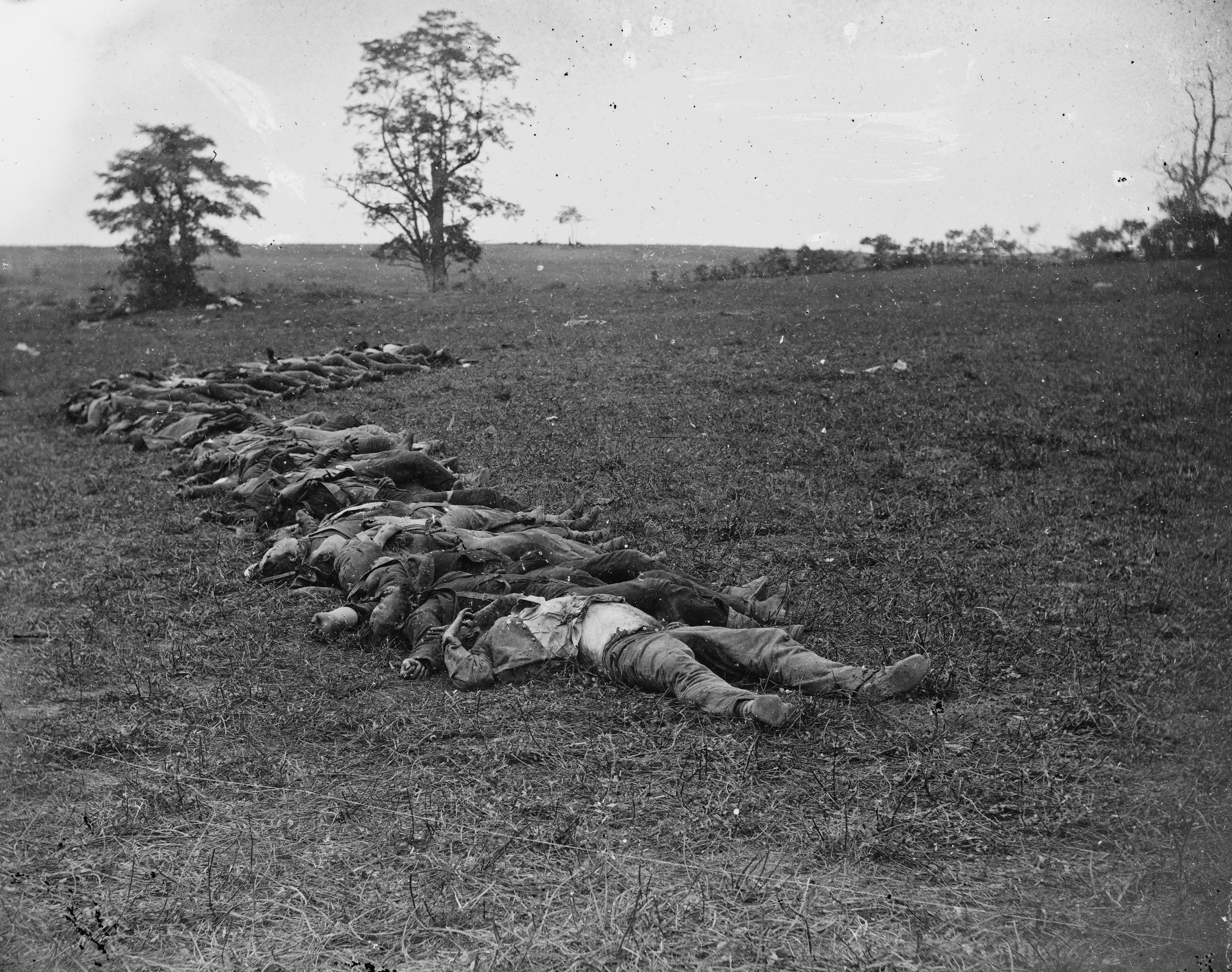
Photograph by Alexander Gardner of Confederate dead gathered for burial after the battle

The battle was over by 5:30 p.m. On the morning of September 18, Lee's army prepared to defend against a Federal assault that never came. After an improvised truce for both sides to recover and exchange their wounded, Lee's forces began withdrawing across the Potomac that evening to return to Virginia. Losses from the battle were heavy on both sides. The Union had 12,410 casualties with 2,108 dead. Confederate casualties were 10,316 with 1,547 dead. This represented 25% of the Federal force and 31% of the Confederates. Overall, both sides lost a combined total of 22,727 casualties in a single day, almost the same amount as the number of losses that had shocked the nation at the two-day Battle of Shiloh five months earlier.

Several generals died as a result of the battle, including major generals Joseph K. Mansfield and Israel B. Richardson and Brigadier General Isaac P. Rodman on the Union side, and brigadier generals Lawrence O. Branch and William E. Starke on the Confederate side. Confederate Brigadier General George B. Anderson was shot in the ankle during the defense of the Bloody Lane. He survived the battle but died later in October after an amputation. Six generals on each side were wounded. All were brigadiers except Union Major General Hooker and Confederate Major General Richard H. Anderson.

Antietam saw the most casualties for a single-day battle during the war, and has been described as the bloodiest day in all of American history. The battle ranks in the top ten in terms of total casualties in American Civil War battles. One source has the battle ranked fifth, falling behind Gettysburg, Chickamauga, Chancellorsville, and Spotsylvania Court House. Another source ranks Antietam eighth with the additional battles of the Wilderness, Shiloh, and Stones River ranked higher. Among those assisting the undersupplied army surgeons during (and after) the battle was Clara Barton, who brought a wagonload of medical supplies to the battlefield. She later founded the American Red Cross disaster relief organization.

=== Reactions and significance ===
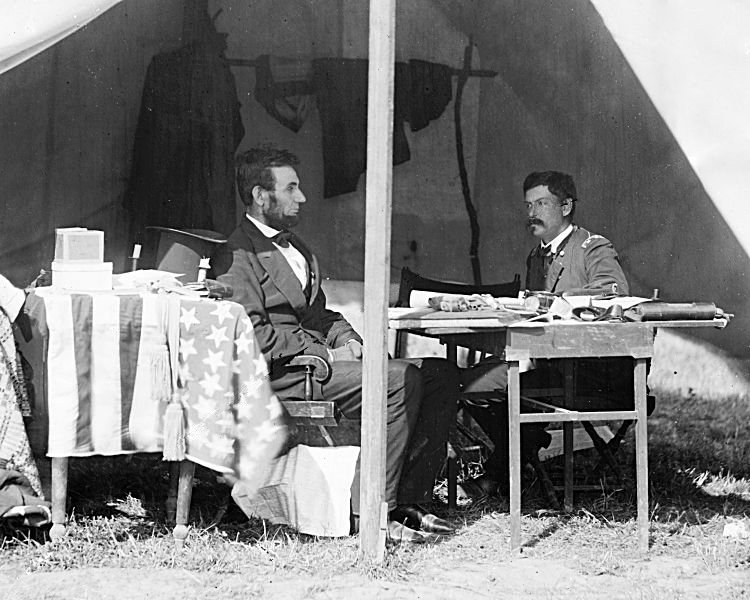
Photograph by Alexander Gardner of Lincoln and McClellan near the Antietam battlefield, October 3, 1862

President Lincoln was disappointed in McClellan's performance. He believed that McClellan's overly cautious and poorly coordinated actions in the field had forced the battle to a draw rather than a crippling Confederate defeat. The president was even more astonished that from September 17 to October 26, despite repeated entreaties from the War Department and the president himself, McClellan declined to pursue Lee across the Potomac, citing shortages of equipment and the fear of overextending his forces. General-in-Chief Henry W. Halleck wrote in his official report, "The long inactivity of so large an army in the face of a defeated foe, and during the most favorable season for rapid movements and a vigorous campaign, was a matter of great disappointment and regret." Lincoln relieved McClellan of his command of the Army of the Potomac on November 5, effectively ending the general's military career. He was replaced on November 9 by General Burnside.

Casualties were comparable on both sides, although Lee lost a higher percentage of his army. While Lee had successfully held off repeated Union assaults, he withdrew from the battlefield first, the technical definition of the tactical loser in a Civil War battle. In a strategic sense, despite being a tactical draw, Antietam is considered a turning point of the war and a victory for the Union because it ended Lee's strategic campaign (his first invasion of Union territory). American historian James M. McPherson summed up the importance of the Battle of Antietam in his book, Crossroads of Freedom:

No other campaign and battle in the war had such momentous, multiple consequences as Antietam. In July 1863 the dual Union triumphs at Gettysburg and Vicksburg struck another blow that blunted a renewed Confederate offensive in the East and cut off the western third of the Confederacy from the rest. In September 1864 Sherman's capture of Atlanta electrified the North and set the stage for the final drive to Union victory. These also were pivotal moments. But they would never have happened if the triple Confederate offensives in Mississippi, Kentucky, and most of all Maryland had not been defeated in the fall of 1862.

The results of Antietam were also politically magnified since the battle's outcome allowed President Lincoln to issue the preliminary Emancipation Proclamation on September 22, which gave Confederate states until January 1, 1863, to end their rebellion or else lose their slaves. Although Lincoln had intended to do so earlier, Secretary of State William H. Seward, at a cabinet meeting, advised him to wait until the Union won a significant victory so as to avoid the perception that it was issued out of desperation.

The Union victory and Lincoln's proclamation played a considerable role in dissuading the governments of France and Britain from recognizing the Confederacy; some suspected they were planning to do so in the aftermath of another Union defeat. When emancipation was linked to the progress of the war, neither government had the political will to oppose the United States, since it linked support of the Confederacy to support for slavery. Both countries had already abolished slavery, and neither the French public nor the British would have tolerated their respective governments militarily supporting a foreign state actively fighting to preserve slavery.

External videos
- Presentation by James McPherson on Crossroads of Freedom: Antietam, September 11, 2008, C-SPAN

Photographers Alexander Gardner and James F. Gibson arrived on the battlefield on September 17 or 18, and took a number of photographs on the battlefield, with most of the work being done between September 19 and September 22. Additional portraits were made in October during a visit by Lincoln to the Union army. The Union public showed great interest in the photographs, particularly those taken of corpses on the field. This was the first time that an American battlefield had been photographed before the casualties had been removed.

== Battlefield preservation ==
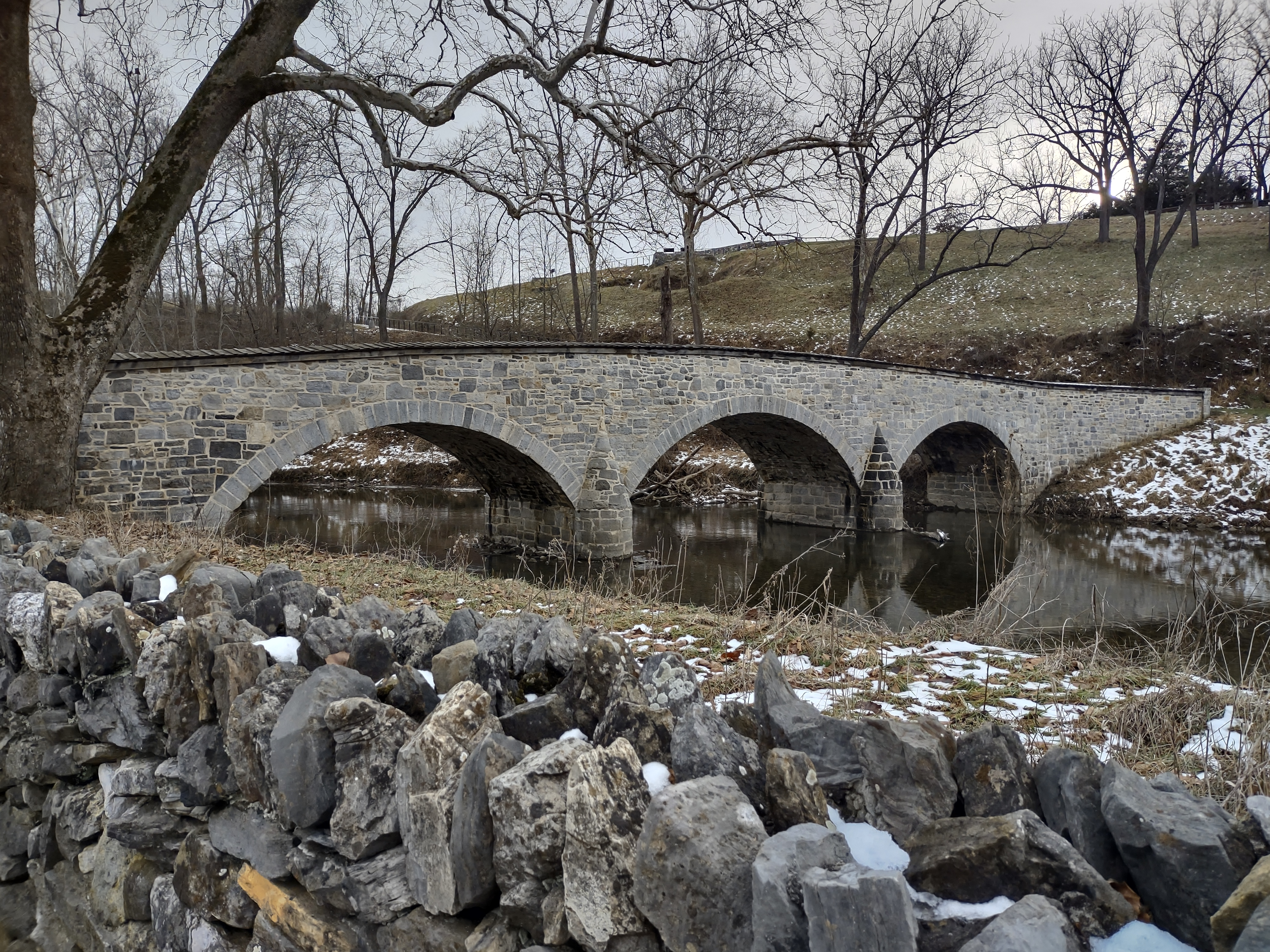
2022 view of Burnside's Bridge, preserved in Antietam National Battlefield

The battle is commemorated at Antietam National Battlefield. Conservation work undertaken by Antietam National Battlefield and private groups, has earned Antietam a reputation as one of the nation's best preserved Civil War battlefields. Few visual intrusions mar the landscape, letting visitors experience the site nearly as it was in 1862.

Antietam was one of the first five Civil War battlefields preserved federally, receiving that distinction on August 30, 1890. Over 300 tablets have been placed to mark the spots of individual regiments and of significant phases in the battle. The battlefield was transferred to the Department of the Interior in 1933. The Antietam National Battlefield now consists of approximately 3,000 acres.

The American Battlefield Trust and its partners have acquired and preserved 488 acres of the Antietam Battlefield as of January 2024. In 2015, the Trust saved 44.4 acres in the heart of the battlefield, between the Cornfield and the Dunker Church, when it purchased the Wilson farm for about $1 million. The preservation organization has since removed the postwar house and barn that stood on the property along Hagerstown Pike and returned the land to its wartime appearance.

== See also ==
- Antietam National Battlefield
- Bibliography of the American Civil War
- List of American Civil War battles
- List of costliest American Civil War land battles
- Troop engagements of the American Civil War, 1862

== Bibliography ==
=== Secondary sources ===
- Armstrong, Marion V. (2002). Disaster in the West Woods: General Edwin V. Sumner and the II Corps at Antietam. Sharpsburg, MD: Western Maryland Interpretive Association.
- Bailey, Ronald H. (1984). The Bloodiest Day: The Battle of Antietam. Alexandria, VA: Time-Life Books. ISBN 0-8094-4740-1.
- Bohannon, Keith S. (1999). "Dirty, Ragged, and Ill-Provided For: Confederate Logistical Problems in the 1862 Maryland Campaign and Their Solutions". In Gallagher, Gary W. (ed.). The Antietam Campaign. Chapel Hill, North Carolina: University of North Carolina Press. pp. 101–142. ISBN 978-0-8078-5894-3.
- Cannan, John. The Antietam Campaign: August–September 1862. Mechanicsburg, PA: Stackpole, 1994. ISBN 0-938289-91-8.
- Cleaves, Freeman (1960). Meade of Gettysburg. University of Oklahoma Press. Reprint: ISBN 0-8061-2298-6.
- Eicher, David J. (2001). The Longest Night: A Military History of the Civil War. New York: Simon & Schuster. ISBN 0-684-84944-5.
- Esposito, Vincent J. (1959). West Point Atlas of American Wars. Vol. 1: 1689–1900 (1st ed.). New York: Frederick A. Praeger Publishers. OCLC 5890637.
- Frassanito, William A. (1978). Antietam: The Photographic Legacy of America's Bloodiest Day. New York, New York: Charles Scribner's Sons. ISBN 0-684-17645-9.
- Glatthaar, Joseph T. (2008). General Lee's Army: From Victory to Collapse. New York, New York: Free Press. ISBN 978-0-684-82787-2.
- Gottfried, Bradley M., ed. (2021). The Brigades of Antietam. Sharpsburg, Maryland: The Antietam Institute. ISBN 978-0-578-96428-7.
- Hanson, Joseph Mills (1998) [1995]. "A Report on the Employment of Artillery at the Battle of Antietam, Maryland". In Johnson, Curt; Anderson, Richard C. (eds.). Artillery Hell: The Employment of Artillery at Antietam. College Station, Texas: Texas A&M University Press. pp. 31–66. ISBN 0-89096-623-0.
- Harsh, Joseph L. Sounding the Shallows: A Confederate Companion for the Maryland Campaign of 1862. Kent, OH: Kent State University Press, 2000. ISBN 0-87338-641-8.
- Harsh, Joseph L. Taken at the Flood: Robert E. Lee and Confederate Strategy in the Maryland Campaign of 1862. Kent, OH: Kent State University Press, 1999. ISBN 0-87338-631-0.
- Hartwig, D. Scott (2012). "Who Would Not Be a Soldier: The Volunteers of '62 in the Maryland Campaign". In Gallagher, Gary W. (ed.). The Antietam Campaign. Chapel Hill, North Carolina: University of North Carolina Press. pp. 143–168. ISBN 978-0-8078-5894-3.
- Hartwig, D. Scott (2023). I Dread the Thought of the Place: The Battle of Antietam and the End of the Maryland Campaign. Johns Hopkins University Press. ISBN 9781421446592.
- Jamieson, Perry D. Death in September: The Antietam Campaign. Abilene, TX: McWhiney Foundation Press, 1999. ISBN 1-893114-07-4.
- Kennedy, Frances H., ed. The Civil War Battlefield Guide. 2nd ed. Boston: Houghton Mifflin Co., 1998. ISBN 0-395-74012-6.
- Luvaas, Jay, and Harold W. Nelson, eds. Guide to the Battle of Antietam. Lawrence: University Press of Kansas, 1987. ISBN 0-7006-0784-6.
- McPherson, James M. (1988). Battle Cry of Freedom. New York: Oxford University Press. ISBN 978-0-19-503863-7.
- McPherson, James M. (2002). Crossroads of Freedom: Antietam, The Battle That Changed the Course of the Civil War. New York: Oxford University Press. ISBN 0-19-513521-0.
- Priest, John Michael. Antietam: The Soldiers' Battle. New York: Oxford University Press, 1989. ISBN 0-19-508466-7.
- Sears, Stephen W. (1983). Landscape Turned Red: The Battle of Antietam. Boston: Houghton Mifflin. ISBN 0-89919-172-X.
- Tucker, Phillip Thomas. Burnside's Bridge: The Climactic Struggle of the 2nd and 20th Georgia at Antietam Creek. Mechanicsburg, PA: Stackpole Books, 2000. ISBN 0-8117-0199-9.
- Welcher, Frank J. The Union Army, 1861–1865 Organization and Operations. Vol. 1, The Eastern Theater. Bloomington: Indiana University Press, 1989. ISBN 0-253-36453-1.
- Wolff, Robert S. (2000). "The Antietam Campaign". In Heidler, David S.; Heidler, Jeanne T. (eds.). Encyclopedia of the American Civil War: A Political, Social, and Military History. New York: W. W. Norton & Company. ISBN 0-393-04758-X.

=== Primary sources ===
- Dawes, Rufus R. (1999) [1890]. A Full Blown Yankee of the Iron Brigade: Service with the Sixth Wisconsin Volunteers. Lincoln, Nebraska: University of Nebraska Press. ISBN 0-8032-6618-9. First published by E. R. Alderman and Sons.
- Douglas, Henry Kyd (1940). I Rode with Stonewall: The War Experiences of the Youngest Member of Jackson's Staff. Chapel Hill, North Carolina: University of North Carolina Press. Reprint: ISBN 0-8078-0337-5.
- U.S. War Department, The War of the Rebellion: a Compilation of the Official Records of the Union and Confederate Armies. Washington, DC: U.S. Government Printing Office, 1880–1901.
