= Dunker Church =

Site at the Antietam battlefield

- Part of Battle of Antietam
- Sharpsburg, Maryland
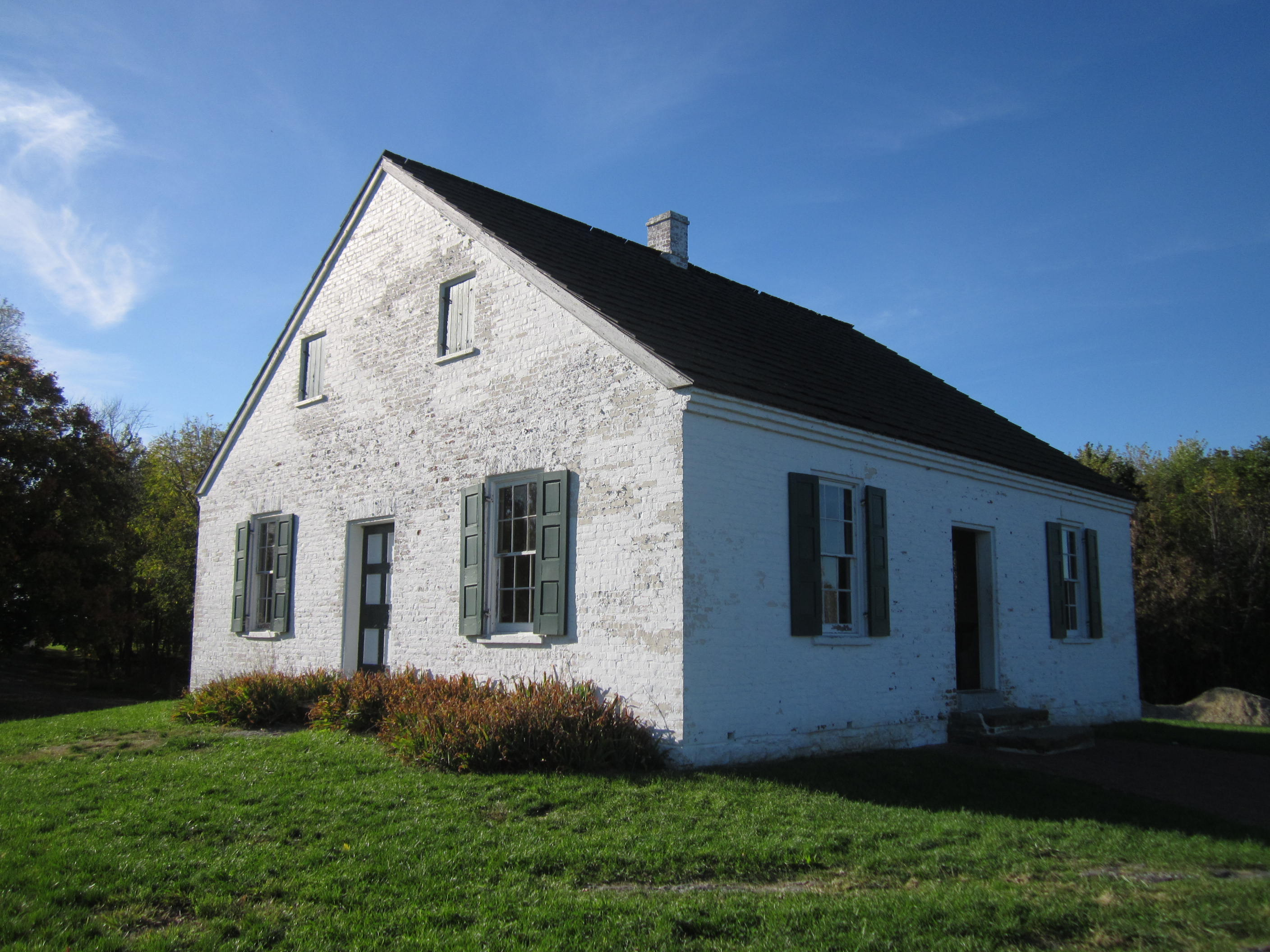
- The Dunker Church

Site information
- Controlled by: United States National Park Service
- Condition: Rebuilt for the Civil War Centennial

Location
- Coordinates: 39°28′31.3″N 77°44′48.4″W

Site history
- Built: 1962
- In use: Site of major battle on September 17, 1862
- Battles/wars: Battle of Antietam
- Events: First major battle fought on Union soil during the American Civil War

The Dunker Church is a historic American Civil War battlefield site, notable for its pivotal and fiercely contested fighting during the Battle of Antietam on September 17, 1862, one of the most significant battles of the Civil War. Originally constructed in 1852 by members of the Schwarzenau Brethren, commonly known as Dunkers for their practice of full-immersion baptism, the simple, whitewashed structure served a small rural congregation near Sharpsburg, Maryland.

== Description ==
During the Battle of Antietam, the bloodiest single day in American history, the church stood near the northern end of the field and became a focal point of intense fighting. Union forces launched repeated assaults against the Confederate left flank anchored near the church, and the building was frequently referenced in official reports by commanders. In the aftermath, Confederate troops briefly used the church as a field hospital. On September 18, a truce was held in front of the church to exchange wounded and bury the dead, an event famously depicted in a sketch by war artist Alfred Waud. One account suggests that the Union Army later used the church as an embalming station. Tradition also holds that President Abraham Lincoln may have visited the site during his October 1862 trip to the Army of the Potomac.

The church was heavily damaged by gunfire and artillery during the battle, leaving it scarred with bullet holes and structural damage. It was repaired in 1864 and continued to serve the community until the end of the 19th century. However, following years of neglect and scavenging by souvenir hunters, the original structure was destroyed in a windstorm in 1921. The site changed hands several times and was briefly home to a gas station and souvenir shop in the 1930s. In 1951, the property was acquired by the Washington County Historical Society and later transferred to the National Park Service. In 1962, for the centennial of the Battle of Antietam, the Dunker Church was reconstructed on its original foundation using salvaged materials.

== History ==
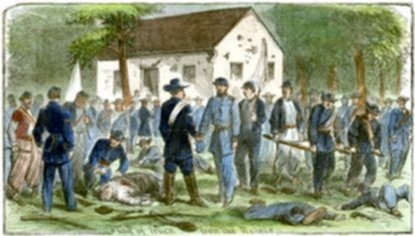
Truce at the Dunker Church, by Alfred Waud

The Dunker Church was built in 1852 by the local Schwarzenau Brethren community on land donated by Samuel Mumma, with the condition that it be used for religious services as long as they continued. A formal dedication was held in 1853. Reflecting the Dunkers' austere and pacifist beliefs, their worship services were plain and solemn. Men and women entered through separate doors and sat on opposite sides of the building, with the most devout congregants seated in the front "amen corners." Elders and the preacher sat on a bench facing the congregation, and the altar was a simple wooden table holding a large family Bible. Services were lengthy, often lasting several hours, and included no music, instruments, or offerings.

In the course of the battle, around midday, the Army of Northern Virginia brigades of Brigadier Generals Joseph B. Kershaw and William Barksdale along with several regiments from Brig. Gen. George T. Anderson's brigade pursued retreating Union units from the West Woods in the direction of the church. However, they were soon repulsed by infantry fire and artillery from the Army of the Potomac's XII Corps. While most of the division belonging to Major General Lafayette McLaws moved into the West Woods to attack forces belonging to Maj. Gen. John Sedgwick, three of Kershaw's regiments--the 2nd, 7th, and 8th South Carolina Infantry--assaulted a battery belonging to Captain John Almy Tompkins' Battery A, 1st Rhode Island Light Artillery Regiment. As Tompkins opened with canister shot, troops belonging to Brig. Gen. George S. Greene rushed to the battery's defense. Kershaw's men fell back across the Hagerstown turnpike and behind the Dunker Church. Federal regiments from the brigades of Lieutenant Colonel Hector Tyndale and Colonel Henry J. Stainrook followed them.

The 3rd Maryland and 111th Pennsylvania regiments deployed at right angles to the Hagerstown Pike. Their line was reinforced by two artillery pieces from Battery E, 1st Pennsylvania Light Artillery, with one placed directly on the road, the other just inside the woods. Nearby, behind the church and near the earlier position of the 125th Pennsylvania Infantry Regiment in the West Woods, the 28th Pennsylvania of Tyndale's brigade aligned nearly perpendicular to Stainrook's men. As Confederate wounded and stragglers surrendered around the church, one Union soldier reportedly refused to escort them, stating, "We did not go in for taking prisoners, but went in to kill." To bolster this line, acting XII Corps commander Brigadier General Alpheus S. Williams dispatched the 13th New Jersey Infantry Regiment under Col. Ezra A. Carman to extend the right flank of the 28th Pennsylvania, while the Purnell Legion of Maryland took position along the pike to the right of the church. These two units’ right flanks rested dangerously close to a ravine previously used by Barksdale’s Mississippians to flank Sedgwick’s men in the morning. Despite this, neither Union regiment initially secured their flank. Believing friendly forces still occupied the West Woods, Greene ordered them not to fire in that direction.

At the outset of Greene's advance near the Dunker Church, the Confederates had not yet established a firm defensive line. The nearest Southern units belonged to Brig. Gen. John G. Walker’s division, but their skirmishers, mainly from Col. Van. H. Manning's brigade, were quickly repelled by the 28th Pennsylvania and 13th New Jersey. Meanwhile, scouts from Brig. Gen. Robert Ransom's North Carolina Brigade, positioned behind the West Woods, spotted the two artillery pieces. In response, Ransom ordered the 49th North Carolina to move through the ravine previously used by Barksdale's brigade, intending to approach the guns from the rear and strike the Union flank. This maneuver brought the regiment directly onto the vulnerable right of Carman’s 13th New Jersey and the adjacent Purnell Legion.

Recognizing the threat, Carman turned part of his regiment toward the ravine and dispatched adjutant Charles Hopkins to investigate the commotion. Hopkins later recalled seeing the glint of rifles and, following Greene’s caution not to fire toward friendly troops, rushed forward to confirm their identity. Near the base of the ravine, he shouted, "They are rebs", just as enemy volleys opened fire. Greene’s right flank collapsed rapidly under the assault, and Carman ordered a retreat to avoid annihilation. The Purnell Legion likewise withdrew toward the Mumma farm. With the right flank broken, the remainder of Greene's line near the church gave way. The 28th Pennsylvania, under pressure from multiple Confederate regiments, faltered as its commander, Tyndale, was seriously wounded while trying to rally his men. Though Manning was also wounded, two of his regiments, the 27th North Carolina and 3rd Arkansas, pressed forward and overran the 3rd Maryland, 111th Pennsylvania, and the detached battery. According to a Confederate observer, the assault killed all the artillery horses and many crewmen before the guns could be fired. The survivors fled toward the Mumma farm, abandoning one cannon in their haste. With Union forces in retreat, the Confederates secured control of the Dunker Church for the remainder of the battle.
