= South Carolina Highway 230 =

State highway in South Carolina, United States

South Carolina Highway 230
- Martintown Road

Route information
- Maintained by SCDOT
- Length: 20.730 mi (33.362 km)
- Tourist routes: South Carolina Heritage Corridor: Discovery Route

Major junctions
- South end: US 25 / SC 121 / SC 125 in North Augusta
- US 25 Bus. in North Augusta; I-20 in North Augusta
- North end: SC 23 in West Store Crossroads

Location
- Country: United States
- State: South Carolina
- Counties: Edgefield, Aiken

Highway system
- South Carolina State Highway System; Interstate; US; State; Scenic
← SC 225	→ SC 243

South Carolina Highway 230 (SC 230) is a 20.730-mile (33.362 km) state highway in the U.S. state of South Carolina. The highway connects North Augusta with the Sumter National Forest.

== Route description ==
SC 230 begins at an intersection with SC 23 in the unincorporated community of West Store Crossroads, within Edgefield County. The western end of the highway travels through Sumter National Forest. It travels to the south-southwest and travels through Colliers, where it curves to the south. The highway gradually travels in more and more of a south-southeasterly direction. SC 230 crosses over Horn Creek. Just south of an intersection with Woodlawn Road and Briggs Road, the highway leaves the national forest and crosses over Anderson Branch. After curving back to the south, it crosses over Hardy Creek and Sweetwater Branch. The highway heads to the south-southeast again and travels through Poverty Hill. About 2,000 feet (610 m) later, it enters North Augusta, in which it is a major urban corridor. It crosses over Fox Creek and Pole Branch immediately before an interchange with Interstate 20 (I-20; Strom Thurmond Freeway). SC 230 has a short south section and passes underneath the North Augusta Greeneway. It then curves to the southeast before intersecting U.S. Route 25 Business (US 25 Bus.; Georgia Avenue). Here, SC 125 Truck begins a concurrency with SC 230. A few blocks later, they intersect US 25/SC 121 (Knox Avenue). Signage on the eastbound side notes that SC 230 ends here, but signage farther to the southeast shows that it continues concurrent with US 25/SC 121, which take on the Martintown Road name. The four highways intersect SC 125 (Atomic Road). Here, SC 230 meets its eastern terminus, and SC 125 Truck meets its southern terminus.

== Major intersections ==
County	Location	mi	km	Destinations	Notes
Aiken	North Augusta			US 25 south / SC 121 south (East Martintown Road) / SC 125 (Atomic Road) to US 1 / US 78 / US 278 – Augusta, Sav. River Site	Southern end of US 25/SC 121 and SC 125 Truck concurrencies; signed eastern terminus of SC 230; southern terminus of SC 125 Truck
Aiken	North Augusta	0.000	0.000	US 25 north / SC 121 north (Knox Avenue) – Edgefield	Northern end of US 25/SC 121 concurrency; southbound signage and SCDOT reference notes this is the highway's southern terminus.
Aiken	North Augusta	0.540	0.869	US 25 Bus. (Georgia Avenue / SC 125 Truck north) – Newberry, Greenville	Northern end of SC 125 Truck concurrency
Aiken	North Augusta	3.558– 3.560	5.726– 5.729	I-20 (Strom Thurmond Freeway) – Augusta, Columbia	I-20 exit 1
Edgefield	West Store Crossroads	20.730	33.362	SC 23 – Clarks Hill, Edgefield, Columbia	Northern terminus
1.000 mi = 1.609 km; 1.000 km = 0.621 mi: Concurrency terminus
