= Colliers, South Carolina =

Colliers
- City
- Location in South Carolina Colliers (the United States)
- Coordinates: 33°42′32″N 82°4′40″W
- Country: United States
- State: South Carolina
- County: Edgefield County, South Carolina
- Elevation: 420 ft (128 m)
- Time zone: UTC-5 (ET)
- Postal code: 29824
- Area code: 803

Colliers is a city in central South Carolina, United States. Surrounding communities include 2 in surrounding counties of South Carolina and two in Georgia: Augusta, North Augusta, Snead and Edgefield. There are two cemeteries in Colliers: Horn Creek Cemetery and Old Piney Grove Baptist Church Cemetery.
