= 1911 =

1911 in various calendars
- Gregorian calendar: 1911; MCMXI
- Ab urbe condita: 2664
- Armenian calendar: 1360; ԹՎ ՌՅԿ
- Assyrian calendar: 6661
- Baháʼí calendar: 67–68
- Balinese saka calendar: 1832–1833
- Bengali calendar: 1317–1318
- Berber calendar: 2861
- British Regnal year: 1 Geo. 5 – 2 Geo. 5
- Buddhist calendar: 2455
- Burmese calendar: 1273
- Byzantine calendar: 7419–7420
- Chinese calendar: 庚戌年 (Metal Dog); 4608 or 4401 — to — 辛亥年 (Metal Pig); 4609 or 4402
- Coptic calendar: 1627–1628
- Discordian calendar: 3077
- Ethiopian calendar: 1903–1904
- Hebrew calendar: 5671–5672
- Hindu calendars
- Vikram Samvat: 1967–1968
- Shaka Samvat: 1832–1833
- Kali Yuga: 5011–5012
- Holocene calendar: 11911
- Igbo calendar: 911–912
- Iranian calendar: 1289–1290
- Islamic calendar: 1329–1330
- Japanese calendar: Meiji 44 (明治４４年)
- Javanese calendar: 1840–1841
- Juche calendar: N/A
- Julian calendar: Gregorian minus 13 days
- Korean calendar: 4244
- Minguo calendar: 1 before ROC 民前1年
- Nanakshahi calendar: 443
- Thai solar calendar: 2453–2454
- Tibetan calendar: ལྕགས་ཕོ་ཁྱི་ལོ་ (male Iron-Dog); 2037 or 1656 or 884 — to — ལྕགས་མོ་ཕག་ལོ་ (female Iron-Boar); 2038 or 1657 or 885

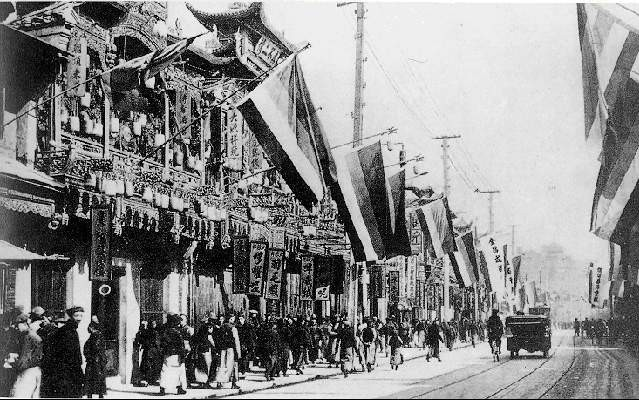
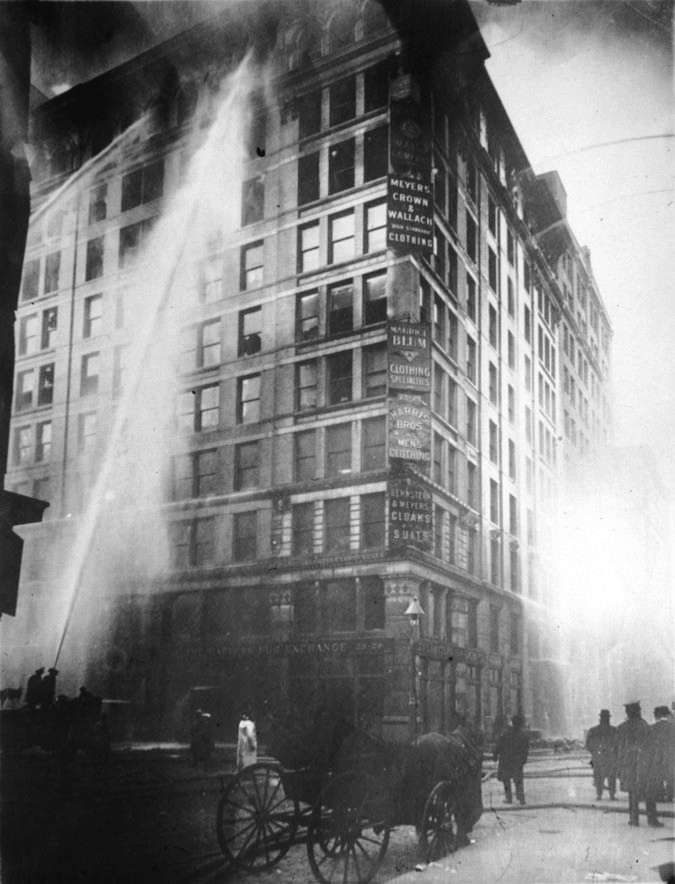
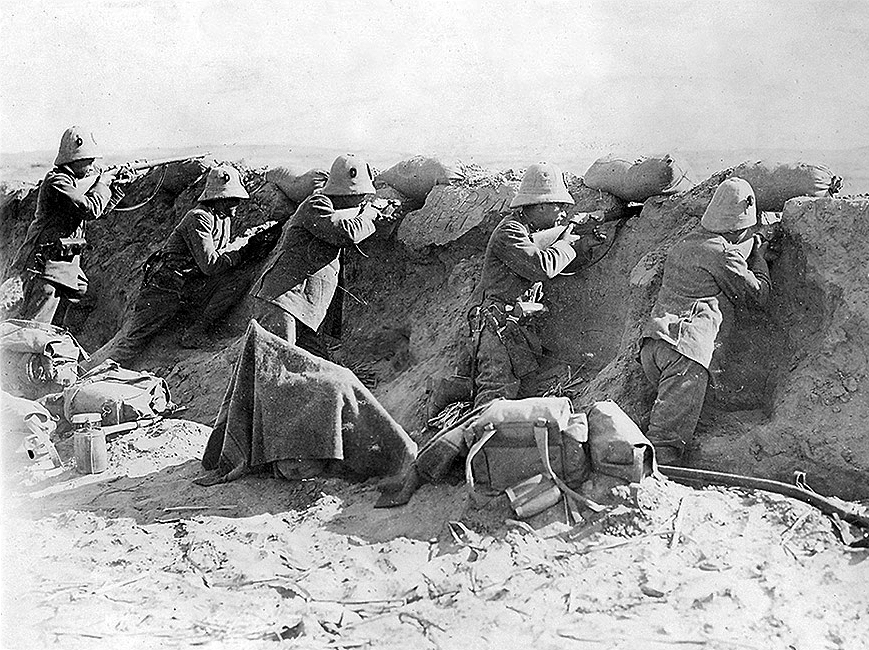
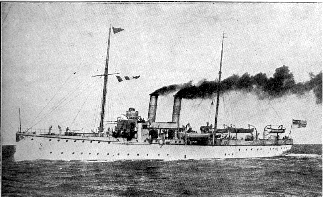
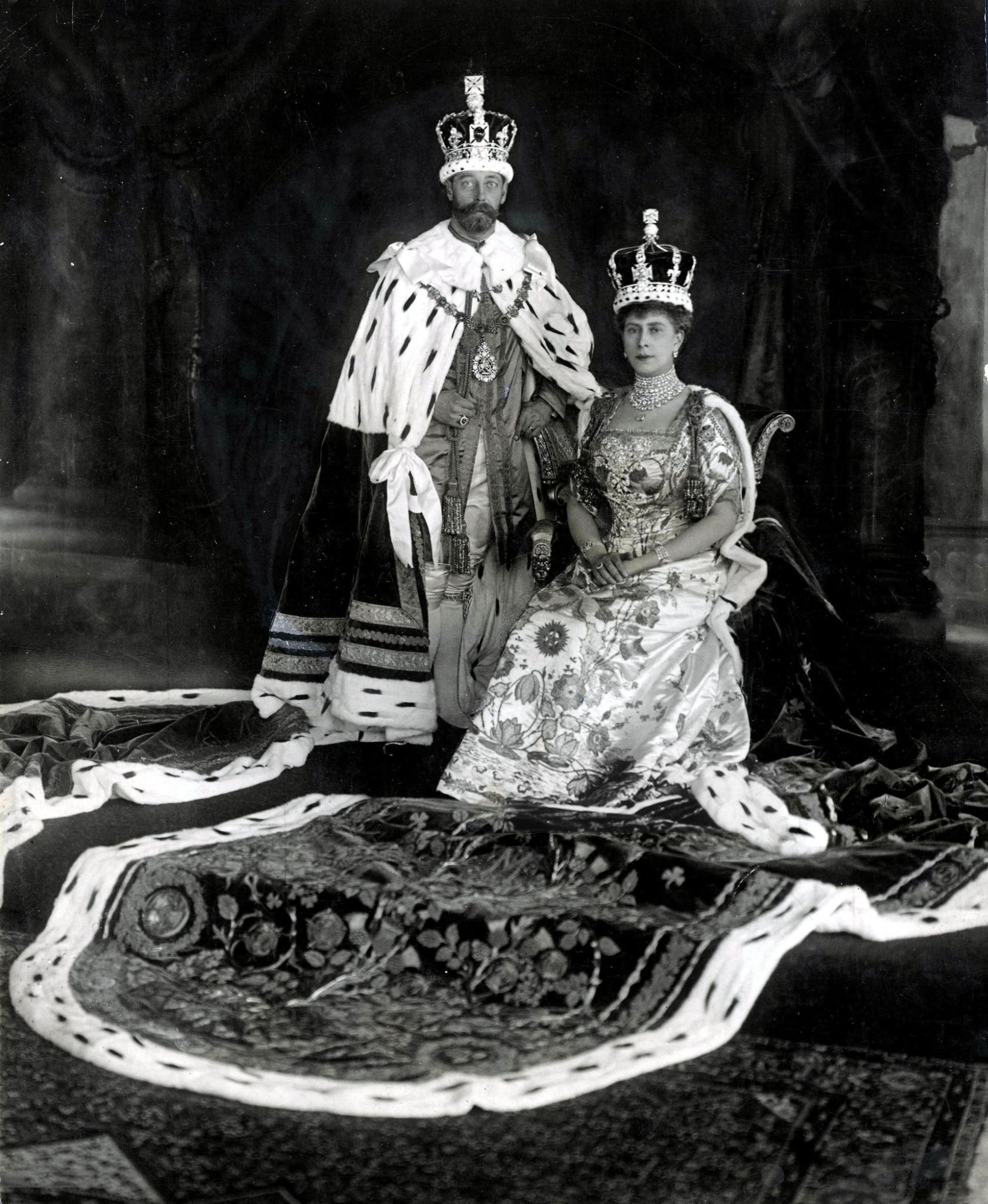
From top to bottom, left to right:
- The 1911 Revolution in China ends over two millennia of imperial rule and establishes the Republic of China;
- The Triangle Shirtwaist Factory fire in New York City kills 146 workers, prompting major labor and safety reforms;
- The Italo-Turkish War begins as Italy invades Ottoman territories in North Africa, marking the first war with aerial bombardment;
- The Agadir Crisis heightens tensions between Germany and France in Morocco, escalating prewar rivalries;
- Roald Amundsen becomes the first person to reach the South Pole;
- The Coronation of George V and Mary at Westminster Abbey inaugurates the new reign in the United Kingdom.

1911 (MCMXI) was a common year starting on Sunday of the Gregorian calendar and a common year starting on Saturday of the Julian calendar, the 1911th year of the Common Era (CE) and Anno Domini (AD) designations, the 911th year of the 2nd millennium, the 11th year of the 20th century, and the 2nd year of the 1910s decade. As of the start of 1911, the Gregorian calendar was 13 days ahead of the Julian calendar, which remained in localized use until 1923.

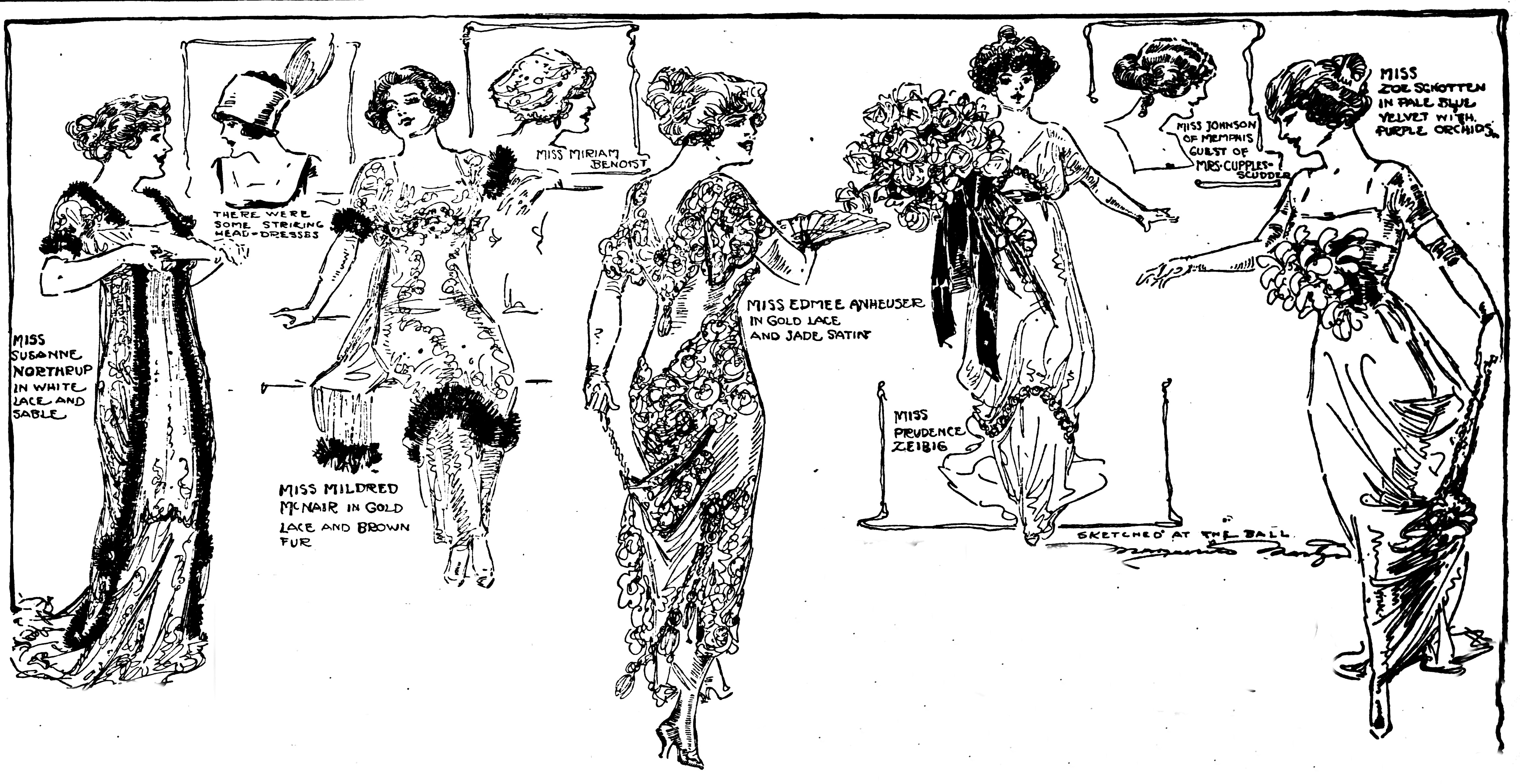
Sketch by Marguerite Martyn of 1911 women's fashion styles

== Events ==
=== January ===
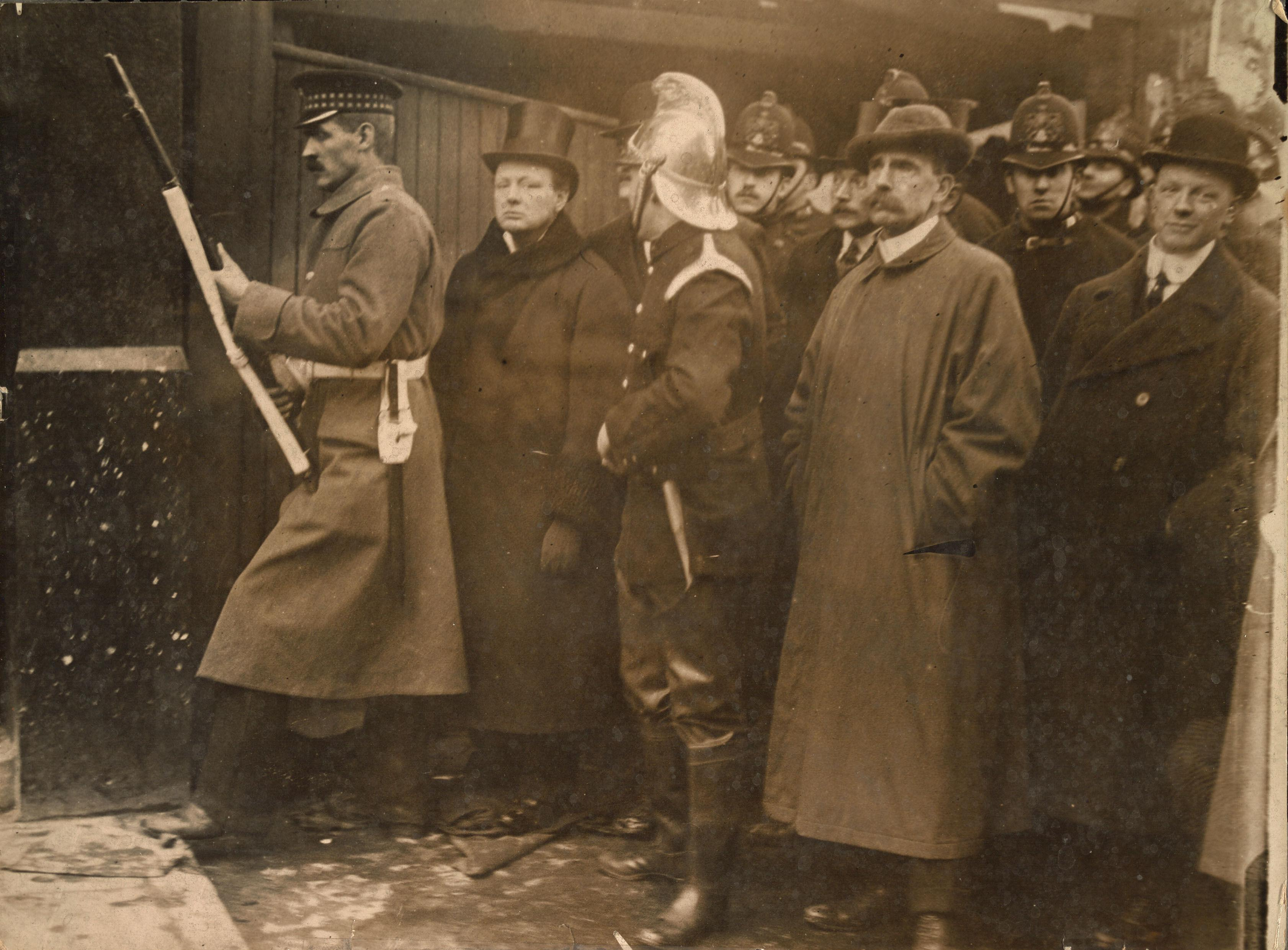
January 3: Siege of Sidney Street in London

- January 1 – A decade after federation, the Northern Territory and the Australian Capital Territory are added to the Commonwealth of Australia.
- January 3
  - 1911 Kebin earthquake: An earthquake of 8.0 moment magnitude strikes near Almaty in Russian Turkestan, killing 450 or more people.
  - Siege of Sidney Street in London: Two Latvian anarchists die, after a seven-hour siege against a combined police and military force. Home Secretary Winston Churchill arrives to oversee events.
- January 4 – Amundsen and Scott expeditions: Robert Falcon Scott's British Terra Nova Expedition to the South Pole arrives in the Antarctic and establishes a base camp at Cape Evans on Ross Island.
- January 5 – Egypt's Zamalek SC is founded as a general sports and Association football club by Belgian lawyer George Merzbach as Qasr El Nile Club.
- January 14 – Amundsen and Scott expeditions: Roald Amundsen's Norwegian South Pole expedition arrives in the Antarctic and establishes a base camp at the Bay of Whales on the eastern edge of the Ross Ice Shelf.
- January 18 – Eugene B. Ely lands on the deck of the USS Pennsylvania stationed in San Francisco harbor, the first time an aircraft has landed on a ship.
- January 21 – First Monte Carlo Rally inaugurated.
- January 26
  - The United States and Canada announce the successful negotiation of their first reciprocal trade agreement.
  - Premiere of Richard Strauss's opera Der Rosenkavalier in Dresden.

=== February ===
- February 5 – The revolution in Haiti is suppressed after the leader, General Montreuil Guillaume, is captured by government troops and shot. General Millionard is executed two days later.
- February 17 – The first "quasi-official" airmail flight occurs, when Fred J. Wiseman carries three letters between Petaluma and Santa Rosa, California.
- February 18
  - The first official air mail flight, second overall, takes place in British India from Allahabad to Naini when Henri Pequet carries 6,500 letters a distance of 13 km.
  - A serious earthquake causes a landslide that creates Lake Sarez in modern-day Tajikistan.

=== March ===
- March 19 – International Women's Day is celebrated for the first time across Europe.
- March 25 – The Triangle Shirtwaist Factory fire in New York City kills 146 people.

=== April ===
- April 3 – Jean Sibelius conducts the premiere of his Symphony No. 4, in Helsinki.
- April 8 – Heike Kamerlingh Onnes discovers superconductivity; he presents his findings on April 28.
- April 13 – Mexican Revolution: Rebels take Agua Prieta on the Sonora–Arizona border; government troops take the town back April 17, when the rebel leader "Red" López gets drunk.
- April 18 – SS Lusitania, a 5,557-ton Portuguese passenger liner en route from Mozambique to Lisbon, strikes Bellows Rock just off Cape Point and sinks.
- April 19 – Mexican Revolution: Francisco I. Madero's troops besiege Ciudad Juárez, but General Juan J. Navarro refuses his surrender demand.
- April 22 – A passenger train from Port Alfred to Grahamstown, South Africa derails on the Blaauwkrantz Bridge, and plunges into the ravine 200 feet (61 metres) below, killing 31 and seriously injuring 23.
- April 26 – HŠK Građanski Zagreb (predecessor of GNK Dinamo Zagreb), a Croatian Association football club, is founded in Zagreb.
- April 27 – Huanghuagang Uprising: In China, rebels take five villages in an attempt to create a power base to fight Imperial rule; those who die are remembered as "The 72 Martyrs" (the event is also called the "Second Guangzhou Uprising" and the "Yellow Flower Mound Revolt").

=== May ===
- May 8 – Mexican Revolution: Pancho Villa launches an attack against government troops in Ciudad Juárez without Madero's permission; the government troops surrender on May 10.
- May 13–15 – Mexican Revolution: Torreón massacre – Over 300 Chinese residents are massacred by the revolutionary forces of Francisco I. Madero, in the Mexican city of Torreón.
- May 15 –Standard Oil is dissolved by the Supreme Court of the United States into 34 separate oil companies including Exxon, Mobil, Chevron, Texaco, and others due to violation of the Sherman Anti-Trust Act
- May 21 – Mexican Revolution: In Ciudad Juárez, a peace treaty is signed between Madero's rebels and government troops.
- May 24 – Mexican Revolution: Government troops fire at anti-Diaz demonstrators in Mexico City, killing about 200 (officials claim only 40).
- May 25 – Mexican Revolution: Porfirio Díaz signs his resignation and leaves for Veracruz; on May 31 he leaves for exile in France.
- May 30 – The first Indianapolis 500 automobile race is held in the United States, won by Ray Harroun at an average speed of 74.59 miles per hour.
- May 31 – The hull of the RMS Titanic is launched in Belfast, on the same day RMS Olympic starts her sea trials.

=== June ===
- June 7 – Mexican Revolution: Francisco Madero arrives in Mexico City, just after the 1911 Michoacán earthquake.
- June 11 – The Sixth Conference of the International Woman Suffrage Alliance opens in Stockholm, Sweden.
- June 13 – Igor Stravinsky's ballet Petrushka is premiered by Sergei Diaghilev's Ballets Russes in Paris with Vaslav Nijinsky in the lead.
- June 14 – RMS Olympic departs Southampton, England, for her maiden voyage. On June 15, she arrives in Queenstown, Ireland, to discharge and take up passengers.
- June 21 – RMS Olympic arrives in New York at the end of her maiden voyage.
- June 22 – George V and Mary are crowned King and Queen of the United Kingdom and the British Dominions, at Westminster Abbey in London.
- June 23 – Frank C. Mars starts the Mars Candy Factory in Tacoma, Washington, origin of Mars, Incorporated, the global confectionery and pet food brand.
- June 28
  - RMS Olympic departs New York for her maiden eastbound voyage home to Southampton, England.
  - The Nakhla meteorite falls in the Abu Hummus region of Egypt, providing evidence of water on Mars.

=== July ===
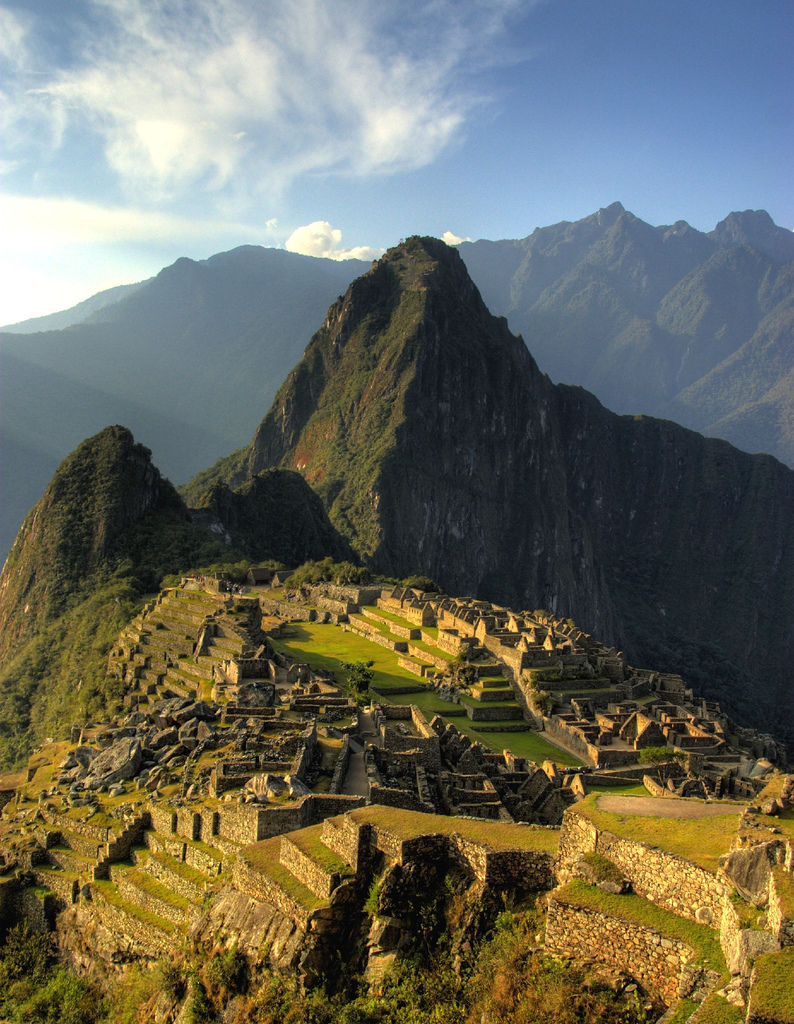
July 24: Machu Picchu rediscovered

- July 1 – The presence of the German warship Panther in the Moroccan port of Agadir triggers the Agadir Crisis.
- July 5 – RMS Olympic arrives in Southampton ending her maiden eastbound voyage from New York.
- July 24 – Hiram Bingham rediscovers Machu Picchu in Peru.
- July 25 – Headington Football Club merge with Headington Quarry to create Headington United, which much later becomes Oxford United F.C. in England.
- July 28 – The Australasian Antarctic Expedition begins as the SY Aurora departs London.

=== August ===
- August 17–20 – Britain's National Railway strike of 1911, its first national strike of railway workers; on August 19 it leads to the Llanelli riots in Wales which result in 6 deaths.
- August 21 – Leonardo da Vinci's Mona Lisa is stolen from the Louvre museum in Paris by Vincenzo Peruggia; the painting is returned in 1913.
- August 27 – CSKA Moscow, a professional multi-sports club in Russia, is officially founded.
- August 29 – Ishi, the last unassimilated Native American in the U.S. using stone tools, emerges from hiding near Oroville, California.

=== September ===
- September 18 – Pyotr Stolypin, third Prime Minister of the Russian Empire is assassinated in Kiev by Leftist revolutionary Dmitry Bogrov and is succeeded by Count Vladimir Kokovtsov.
- September 25 – French battleship Liberté explodes at anchor in Toulon, France, killing around 300 onboard and in the surrounding area.
- September 29 – Italy declares war on the Ottoman Empire.

=== October ===
- October 4 – China adopts "Cup of Solid Gold" as its first national anthem. However, it is never performed publicly and is replaced a few months later with a new composition.
- October 10 – The Wuchang Uprising starts the Xinhai Revolution that leads to the founding of the Republic of China.
- October 16 – Mexican Revolution: Felix Diaz, nephew of Porfirio Díaz, occupies the port of Veracruz, as a sign of rebellion against Madero.
- October 20 – Amundsen and Scott expeditions: Amundsen's expedition sets out for the South Pole from his base camp.

=== November ===
- November 1
  - The world's first combat aerial bombing mission takes place in Libya, during the Italo-Turkish War. Second Lieutenant Giulio Gavotti of Italy drops several small bombs.
  - Amundsen and Scott expeditions: Capt. Scott's Terra Nova Expedition sets out for the South Pole from his base camp.
- November 3 – Chevrolet officially enters the automobile market in the United States, in competition with the Ford Model T.
- November 4 – Morocco–Congo Treaty brings the Agadir Crisis to a close. This treaty leads Morocco to be split between France (as a protectorate) and Spain (as the colony of Spanish Sahara), with Germany forfeiting all claims to Morocco. In return, France gives Germany a portion of the French Congo (as Kamerun) and Germany cedes some of German Kamerun to France (as Chad).
- November 5 – Italy annexes Tripoli and Cyrenaica (confirmed by an act of the Italian Parliament on February 25, 1912).
- November 17 – Omega Psi Phi fraternity is founded on the campus of Howard University, in Washington, D.C.

=== December ===
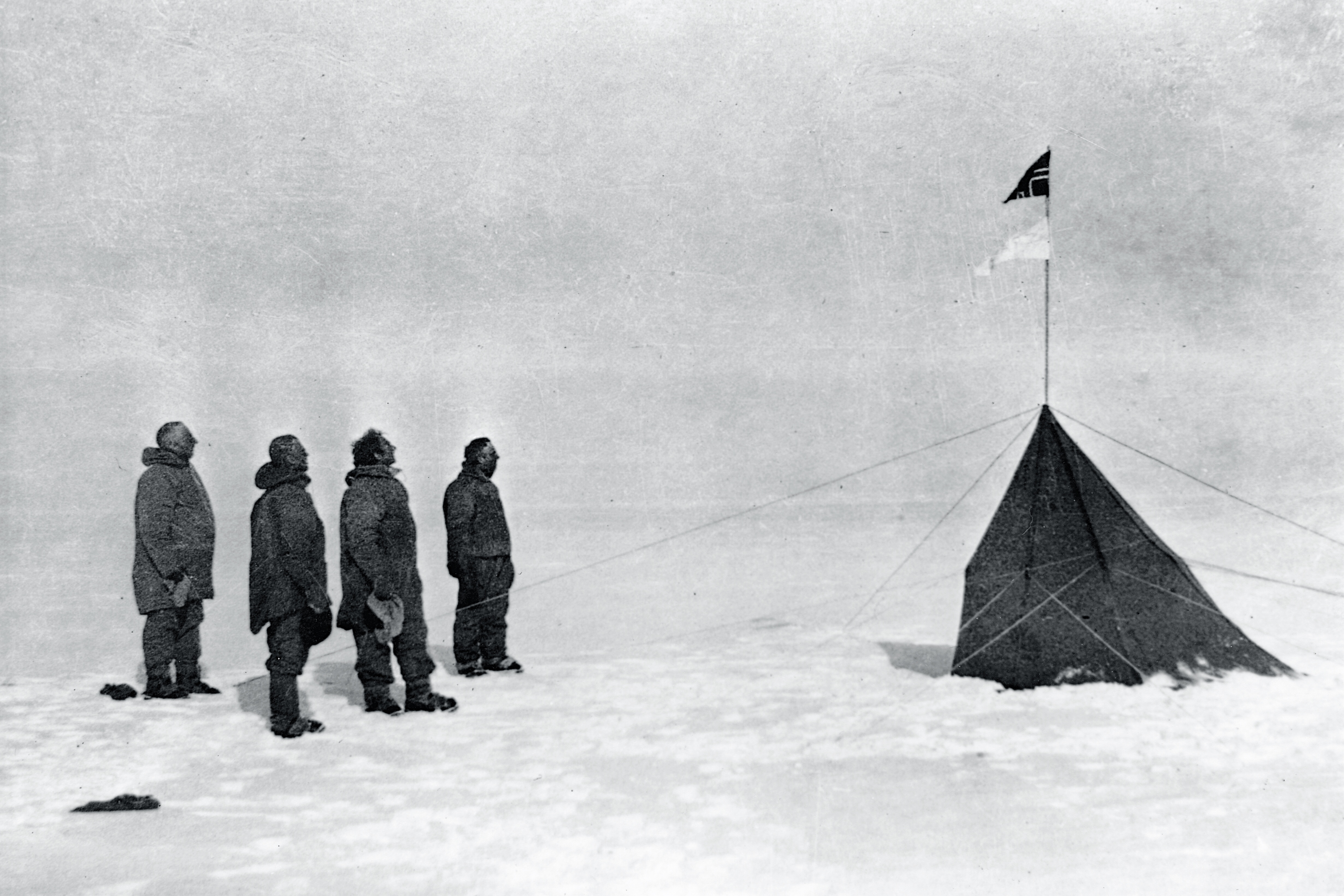
December 14: Roald Amundsen reaches the South Pole

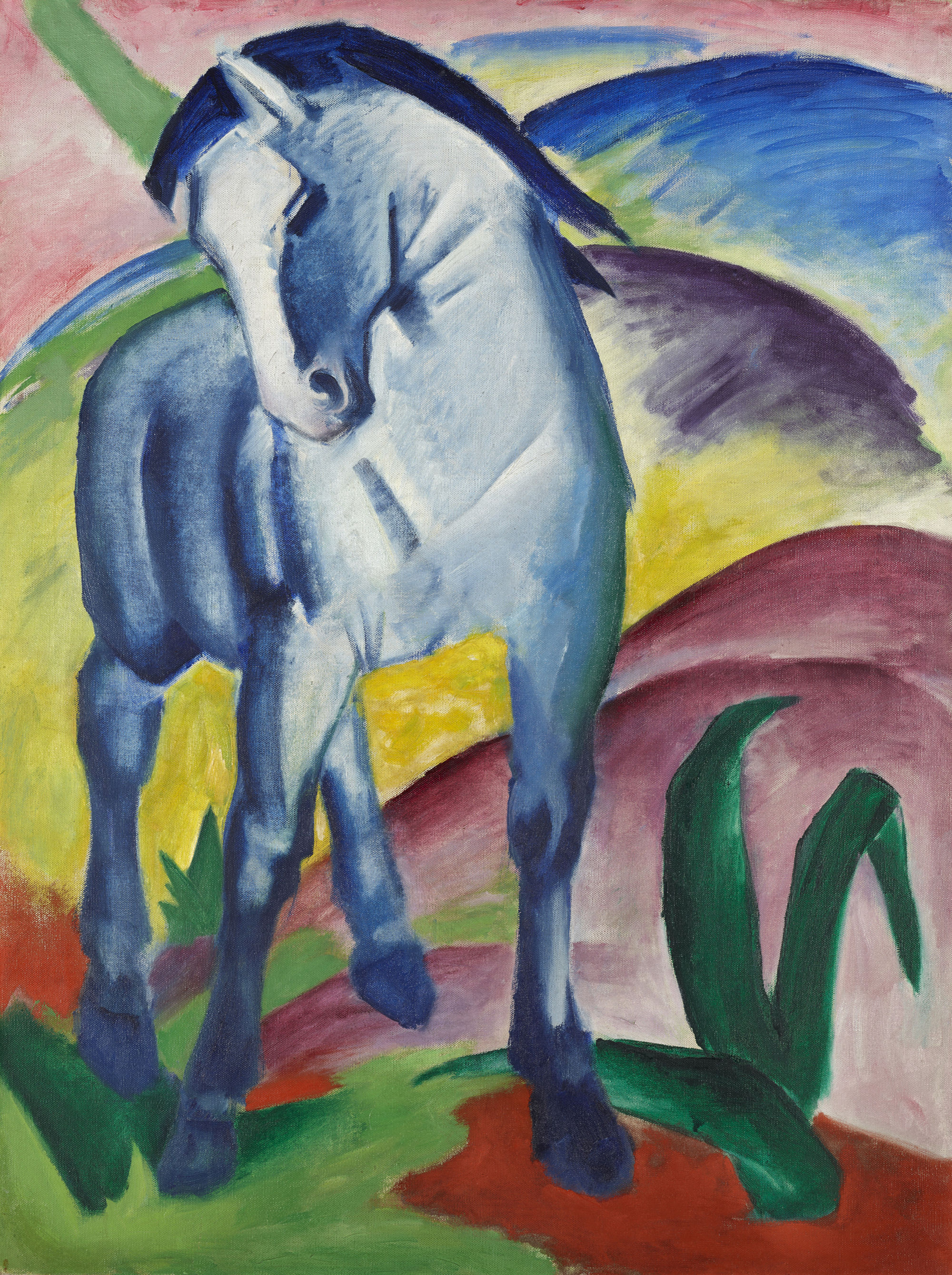
December 18: Franz Marc, Blaues Pferd I

- December 1 – Outer Mongolia, the predecessor of modern-day Mongolia, is declared independent from the Chinese Empire.
- December 2 – Australasian Antarctic Expedition sets sail from Hobart.
- December 9 – Cross Mountain Mine disaster: A coal mine explosion near Briceville, Tennessee kills 84 miners, despite rescue efforts led by the United States Bureau of Mines.
- December 12 – The Delhi Durbar is held to mark the coronation of George V and Queen Mary as Emperor and Empress of India, and the transfer of the capital of British India from Calcutta to Delhi.
- December 14 – Amundsen and Scott expeditions: Roald Amundsen's Norwegian expedition reaches the geographical South Pole, 34 days ahead of Capt. Scott. News of Amundsen's success will not reach the outside world until next March.
- December 18 – The first exhibition by Der Blaue Reiter group of painters opens in Munich.
- December 24 – Lackawanna Cut-Off railway line opens in New Jersey and Pennsylvania.
- December 29 – Sun Yat-sen is elected Provisional President of the Republic of China.

=== Date unknown ===
- The Encyclopædia Britannica Eleventh Edition is published under American management in England, by Cambridge University Press.
- New Zealand-born British physicist Ernest Rutherford deduces the existence of a compact atomic nucleus from experiments involving Rutherford scattering, proposing the Rutherford model of the atom.

== Births ==
=== January ===
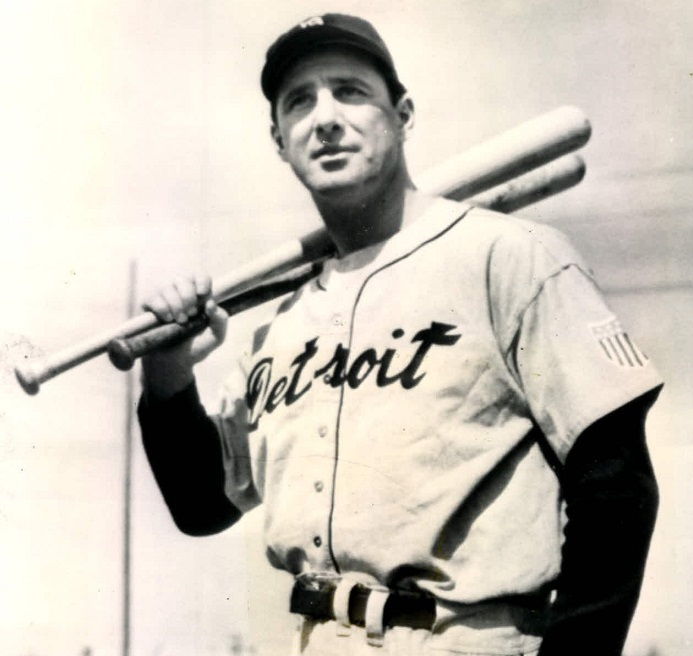
Hank Greenberg

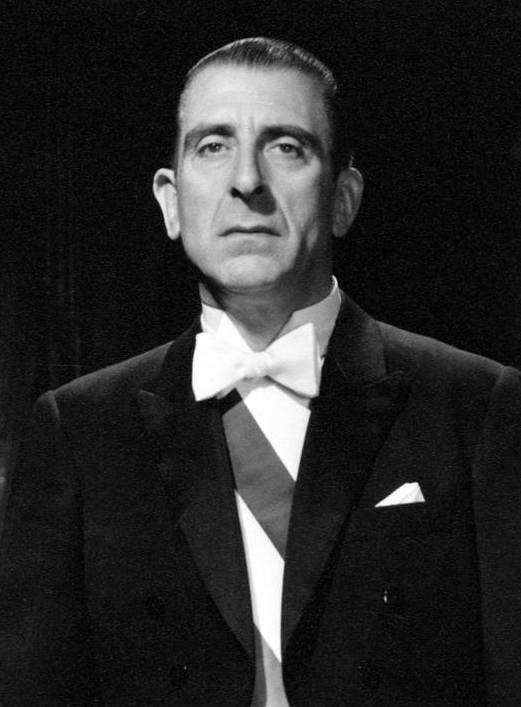
Eduardo Frei Montalva

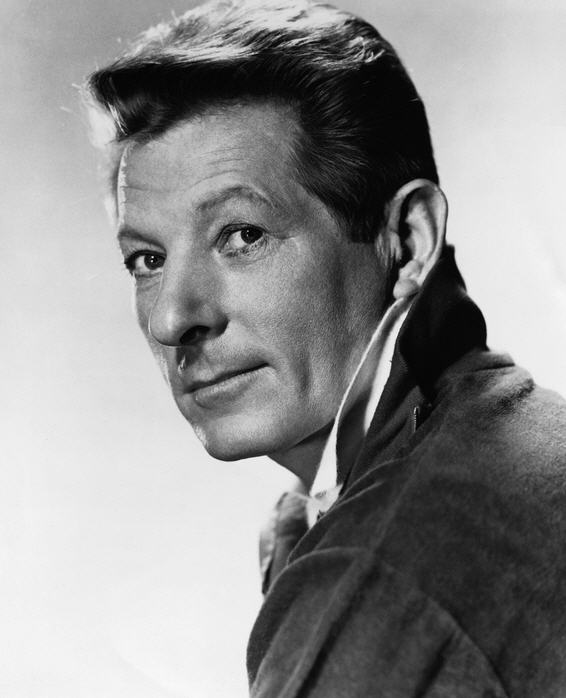
Danny Kaye

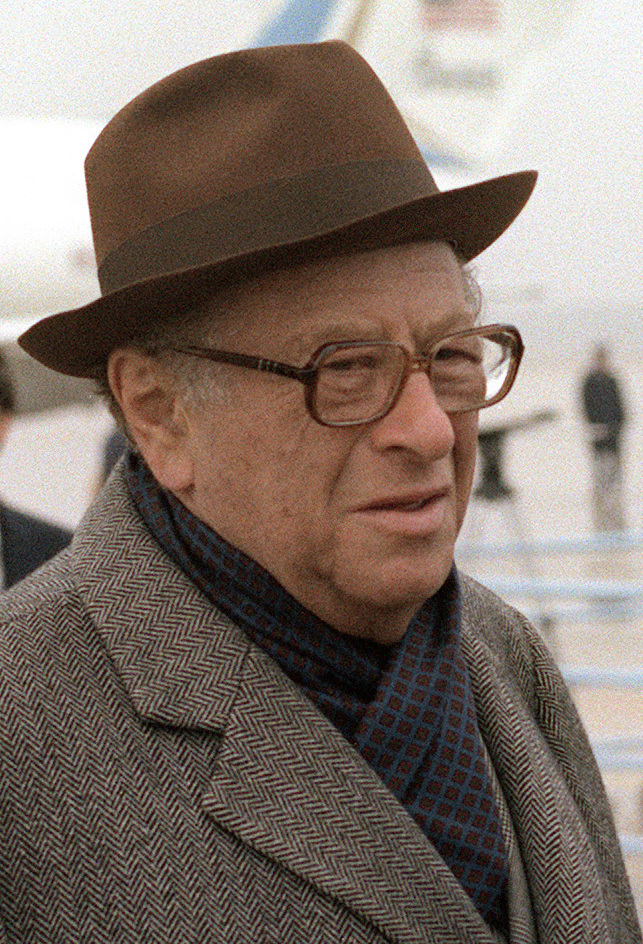
Bruno Kreisky

- January 1
  - Hank Greenberg, American baseball player (d. 1986)
  - Roman Totenberg, Polish-American violinist (d. 2012)
- January 5 – Jean-Pierre Aumont, French actor (d. 2001)
- January 7 – Butterfly McQueen, American actress (d. 1995)
- January 10
  - Binod Bihari Chowdhury, Bangladeshi revolutionary (d. 2013)
  - Norman Heatley, British biologist (d. 2004)
- January 11
  - Brunhilde Pomsel, German broadcaster and secretary (d. 2017)
  - Zenkō Suzuki, 44th Prime Minister of Japan (d. 2004)
  - Bernardino González Ruíz, Panamanian general and politician (d. 2012)
- January 13 – Joh Bjelke-Petersen, 31st Premier of Queensland (d. 2005)
- January 16 – Eduardo Frei Montalva, Chilean politician, 29th President of Chile (d. 1982)
- January 17
  - John S. McCain Jr., American admiral (d. 1981)
  - George Stigler, American economist, Nobel Prize laureate (d. 1991)
- January 18
  - José María Arguedas, Peruvian novelist, poet and anthropologist (d. 1969)
  - Danny Kaye, American actor, comedian (d. 1987)
- January 19 – Choor Singh, Singaporean judge (d. 2009)
- January 22 – Bruno Kreisky, Chancellor of Austria (d. 1990)
- January 25 – Kurt Maetzig, German film director (d. 2012)
- January 26 – Polykarp Kusch, German-born physicist, Nobel Prize laureate (d. 1993)
- January 28 – Johan van Hulst, Dutch politician, academic, author and Yad Vashem recipient (d. 2018)
- January 30 – Roy Eldridge, American jazz musician (d. 1989)
- January 31 – Baba Vanga, blind Bulgarian mystic, clairvoyant and herbalist (d. 1996)

=== February ===
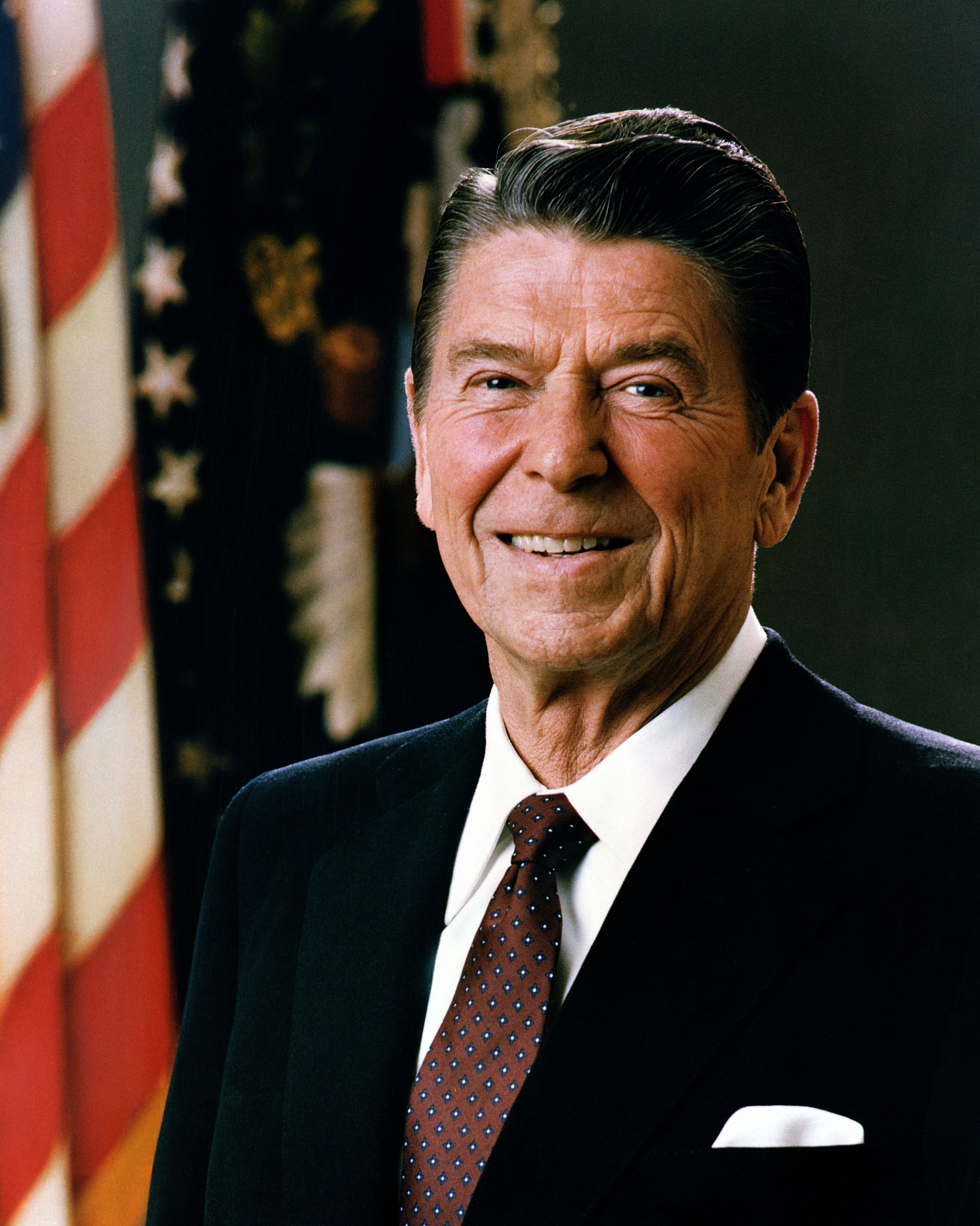
Ronald Reagan

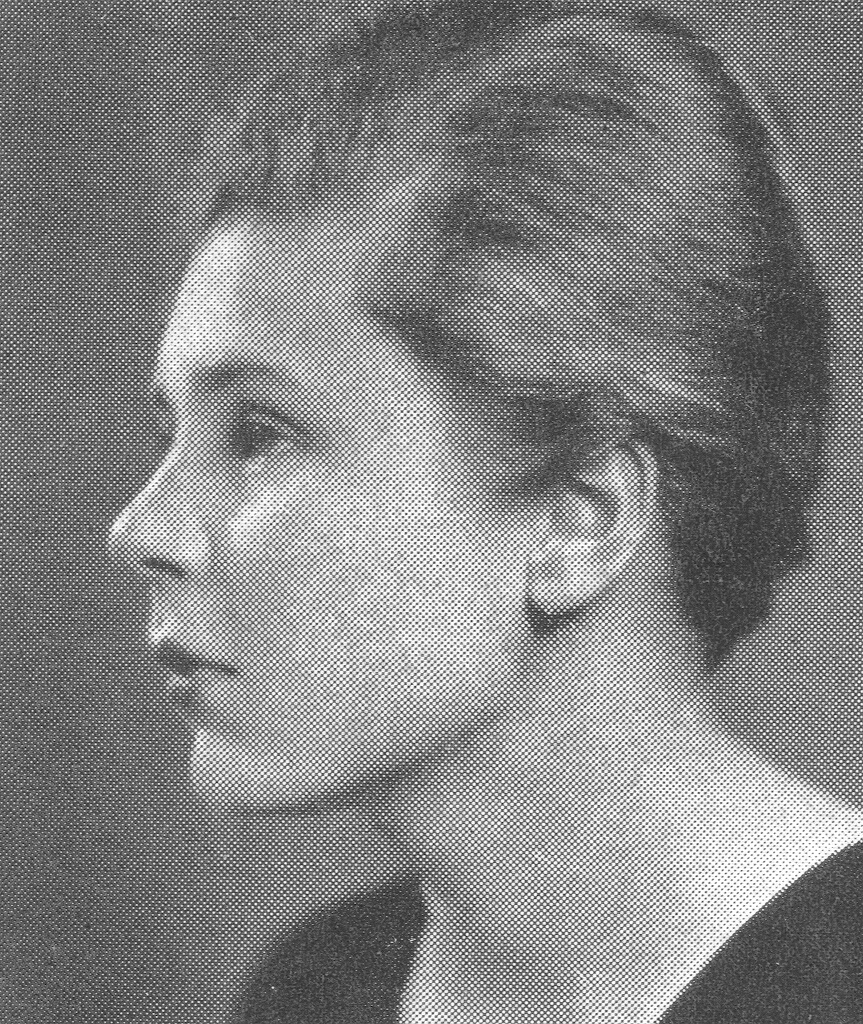
Elizabeth Bishop

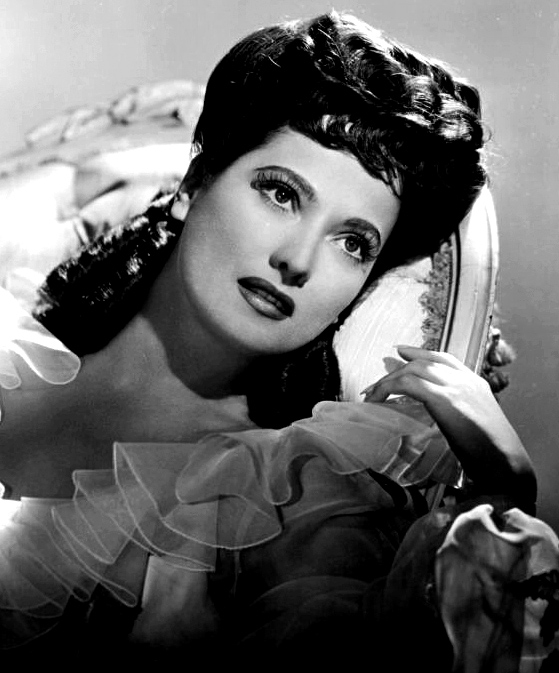
Merle Oberon

- February 5 – Jussi Björling, Swedish tenor (d. 1960)
- February 6 – Ronald Reagan, 40th President of the United States and actor (d. 2004)
- February 8 – Elizabeth Bishop, American poet (d. 1979)
- February 12 – Cearbhall Ó Dálaigh (Carroll Daly), 5th President of Ireland (d. 1978)
- February 14 – Willem Johan Kolff, Dutch-born American inventor of the artificial kidney (d. 2009)
- February 17 – Oskar Seidlin, German-born American literary scholar (d. 1984)
- February 19
  - Bill Bowerman, American track athlete, co-founder of Nike, Inc. (d. 1999)
  - Merle Oberon, British actress (d. 1979)
- February 21 – Madeline Barclay, French SOE agent (d. 1943)
- February 28 – Otakar Vávra, Czech director (d. 2011)

=== March ===
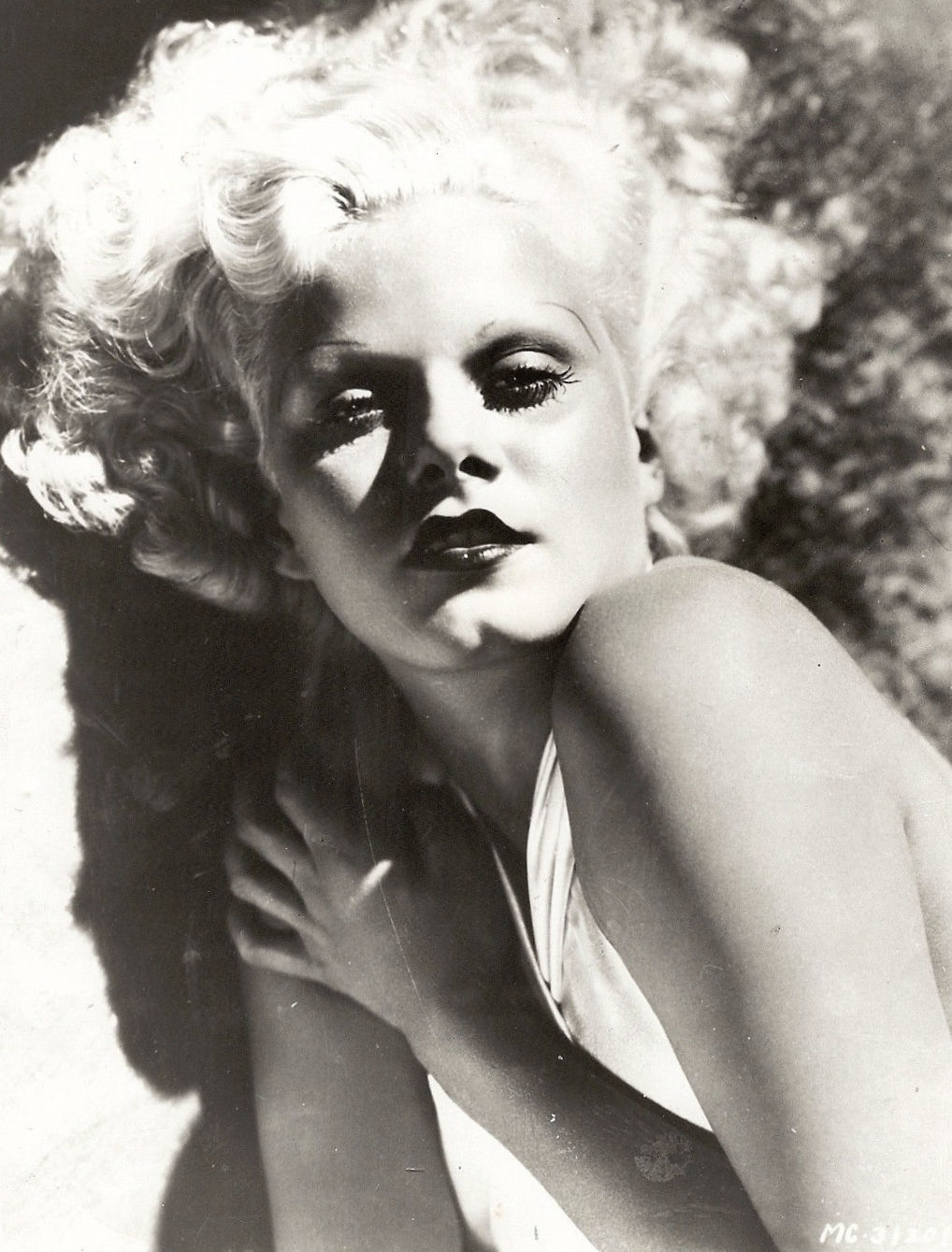
Jean Harlow

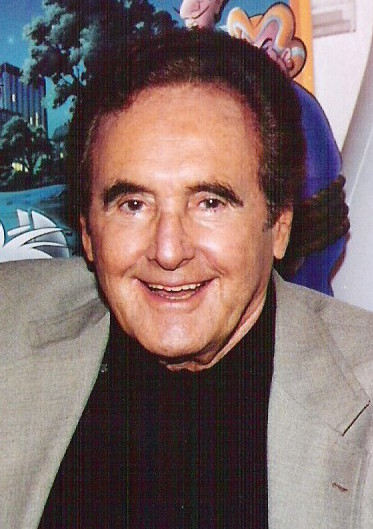
Joseph Barbera

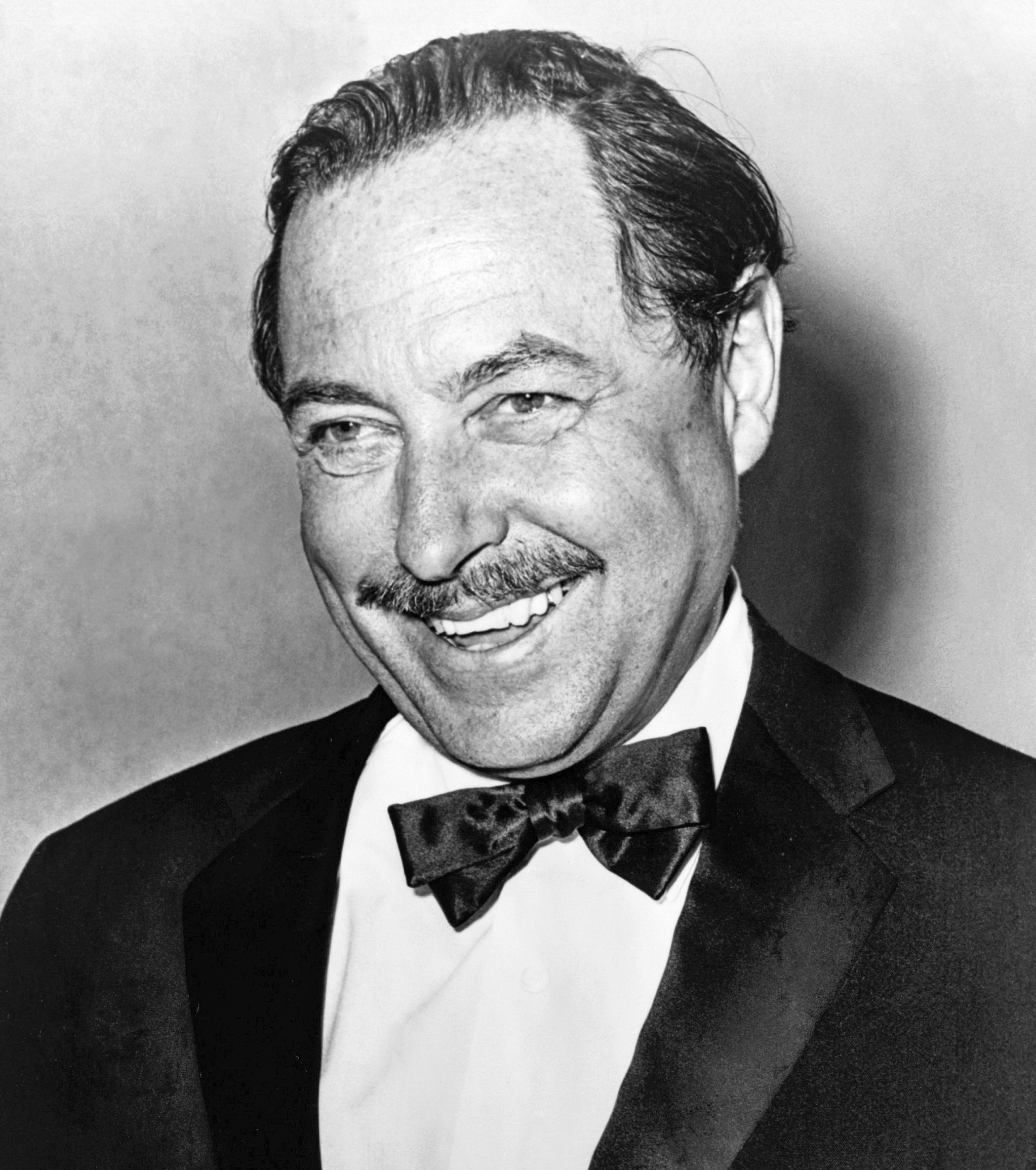
Tennessee Williams

- March 3 – Jean Harlow, American actress (d. 1937)
- March 5 – Wolfgang Larrazábal, 52nd President of Venezuela (d. 2003)
- March 6 – Nikolai Baibakov, Soviet bureaucrat (d. 2008)
- March 8 – Alan Hovhaness, American composer (d. 2000)
- March 10 – Marita Camacho Quirós, First Lady of Costa Rica, supercentenarian (d. 2025)
- March 12 – Gustavo Díaz Ordaz, 49th President of Mexico (d. 1979)
- March 13 – L. Ron Hubbard, American author, founder of Scientology (d. 1986)
- March 16
  - Pierre Harmel, 40th Prime Minister of Belgium (d. 2009)
  - Josef Mengele, German Nazi war criminal (d. 1979)
- March 20 – Alfonso García Robles, Mexican diplomat and politician, Nobel Peace Prize laureate (d. 1991)
- March 24
  - Joseph Barbera, American cartoonist (d. 2006)
  - Jane Drew, English architect (d. 1996)
- March 25 – Jack Ruby, American mobster, killer of Lee Harvey Oswald (d. 1967)
- March 26
  - Bernard Katz, German-born biophysicist, Nobel Prize laureate (d. 2003)
  - Tennessee Williams, American playwright (d. 1983)
- March 27 – Erich Heller, British philosopher (d. 1990)
- March 31 – Elisabeth Grümmer, German soprano (d. 1986)

=== April ===
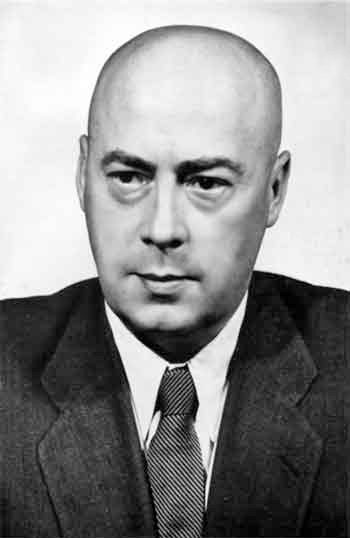
Józef Cyrankiewicz

- April 3
  - Stanisława Walasiewicz, Polish-born American athlete (d. 1980)
  - Sir Michael Woodruff, British/Australian surgeon (d. 2001)
- April 4 – Narciso J. Alegre, Filipino civil liberties advocate (d. 1980)
- April 5 – Hédi Amara Nouira, Tunisian politician, 11th Prime Minister of Tunisia (d. 1993)
- April 6 – Feodor Lynen, German biochemist, Nobel Prize laureate (d. 1979)
- April 8
  - Melvin Calvin, American chemist, Nobel Prize laureate (d. 1997)
  - Emil Cioran, Romanian philosopher and essayist (d. 1995)
  - Ichirō Fujiyama, Japanese composer, singer (d. 1993)
- April 15 – Muhammad Metwalli al-Sha'rawi, Egyptian jurist (d. 1998)
- April 23
  - Józef Cyrankiewicz, Polish communist politician, 2-time Prime Minister of Poland (d. 1989)
  - Ronald Neame, British film cinematographer, producer, screenwriter and director (d. 2010)
- April 26 – Paul Verner, German politician (d. 1986)

=== May ===
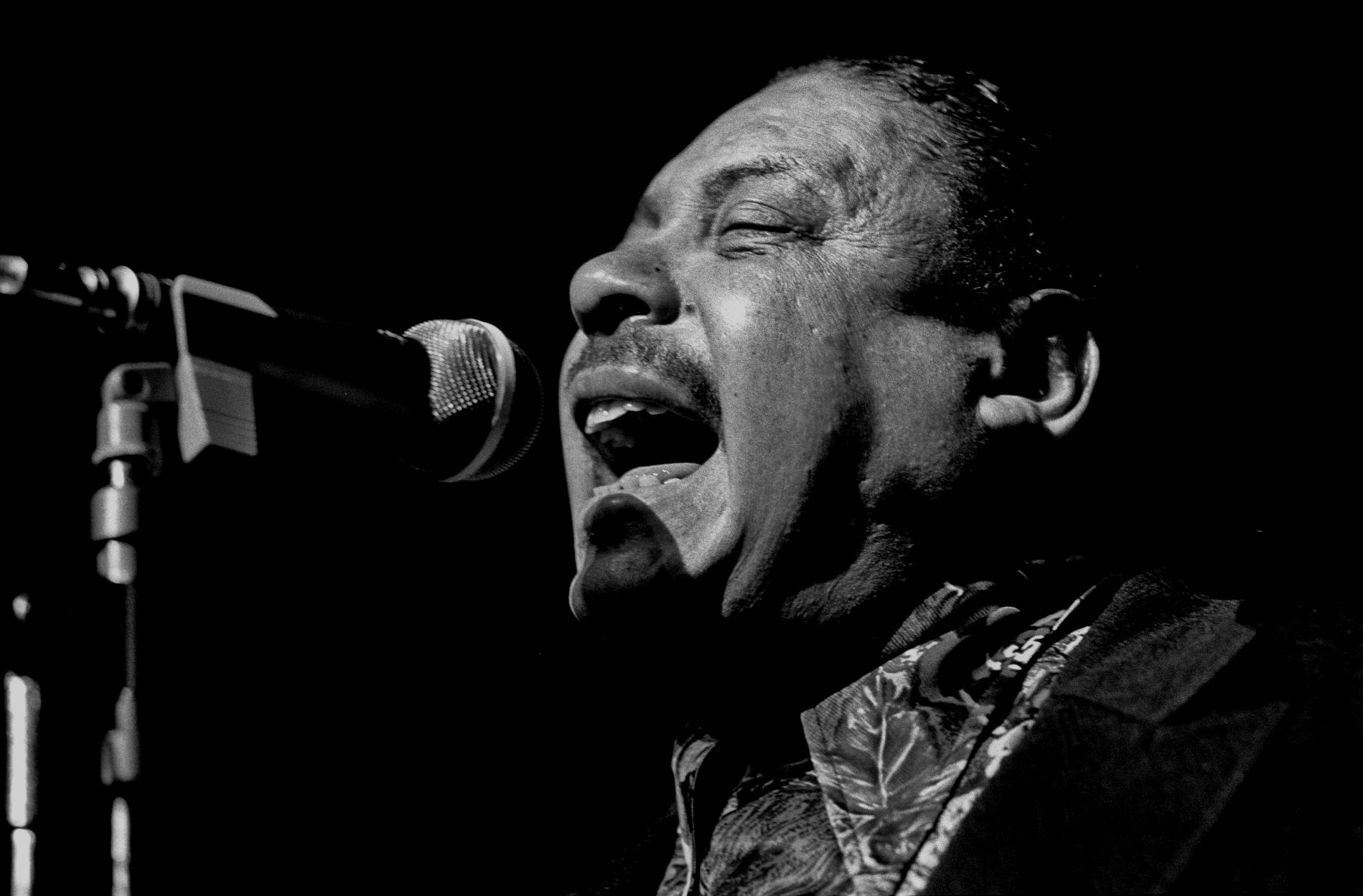
Big Joe Turner

- May 5 – Andor Lilienthal, Hungarian chess grandmaster (d. 2010)
- May 7 – Ishirō Honda, Japanese film director (d. 1993)
- May 8 – Robert Johnson, American guitarist, singer (d. 1938)
- May 10 – Bel Kaufman, German-born American author (d. 2014)
- May 11 – Phil Silvers, American actor, comedian (d. 1985)
- May 15 – Max Frisch, Swiss playwright and novelist (d. 1991)
- May 17
  - Lisa Fonssagrives, Swedish model (d. 1992)
  - Maureen O'Sullivan, Irish actress (d. 1998)
- May 18 – Big Joe Turner, African-American singer (d. 1985)
- May 20 – Gardner Fox, American writer (d. 1986)
- May 22 – Anatol Rapoport, Russian-born American mathematical psychologist (d. 2007)
- May 27
  - Hubert Humphrey, American politician, Vice President of the United States (1965–1969) (d. 1978)
  - Teddy Kollek, Austrian-born Israeli politician, mayor of Jerusalem (d. 2007)
  - Vincent Price, American actor (d. 1993)
- May 31 – Maurice Allais, French economist, Nobel Prize laureate (d. 2010)

=== June ===
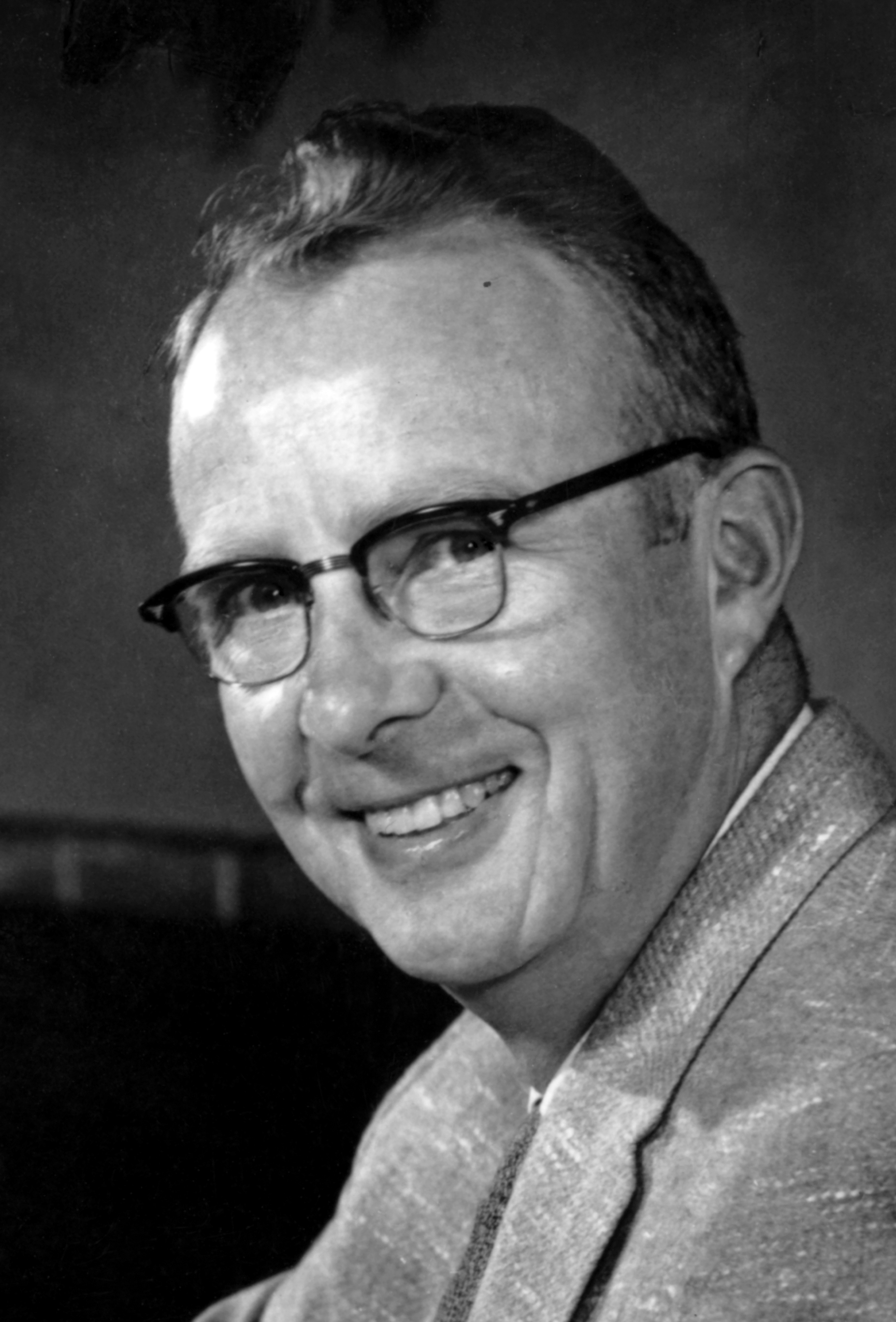
Luis Walter Alvarez

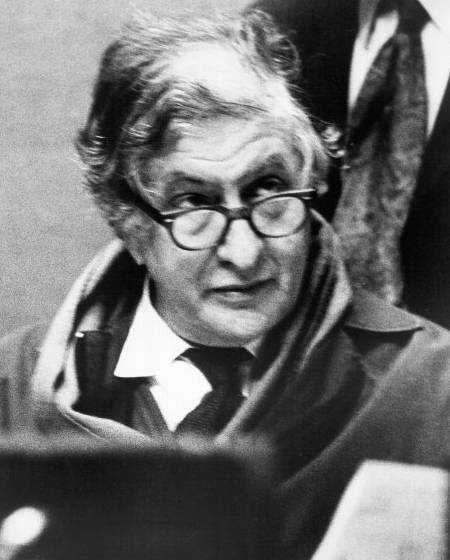
Bernard Herrmann

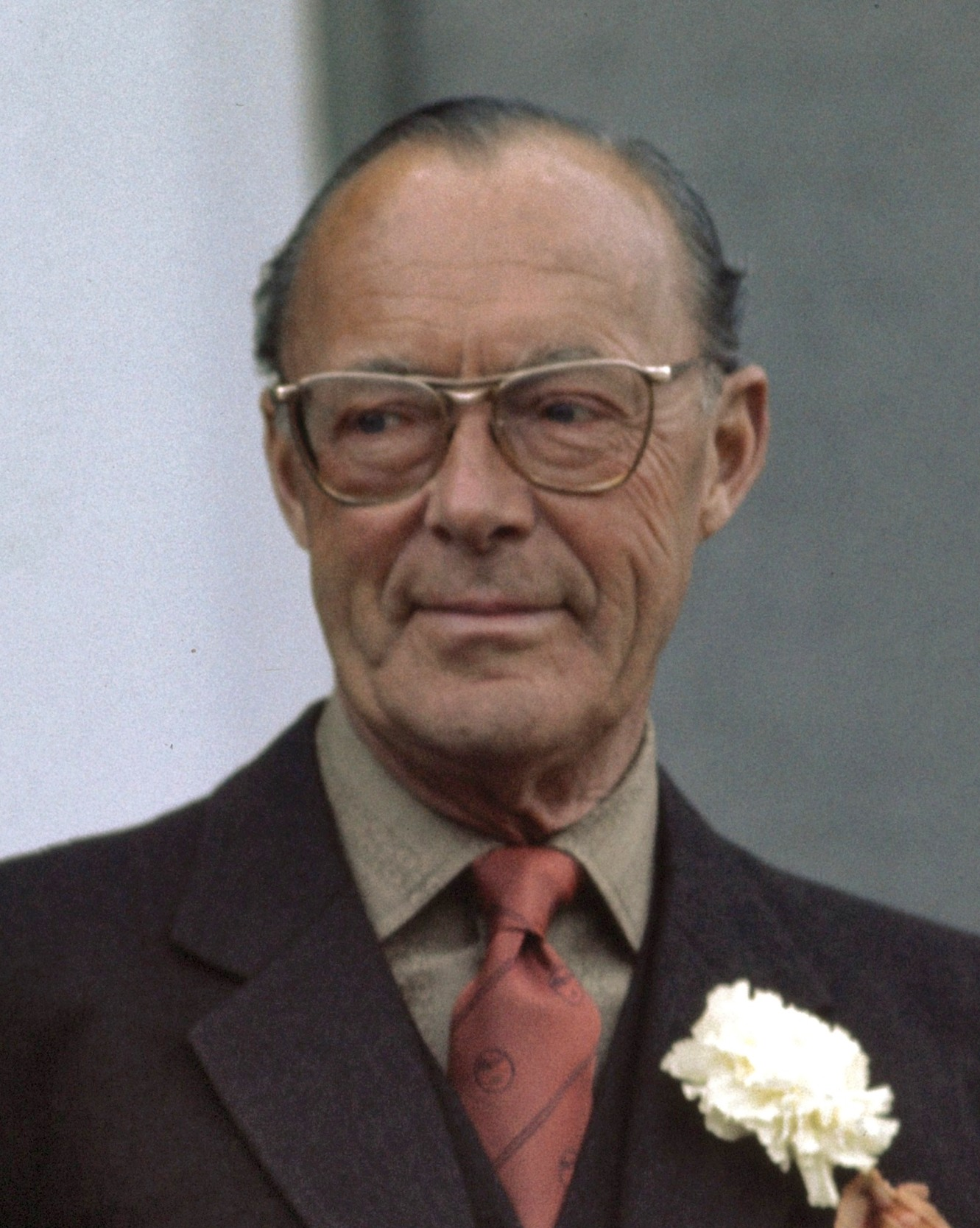
Prince Bernhard of Lippe-Biesterfeld

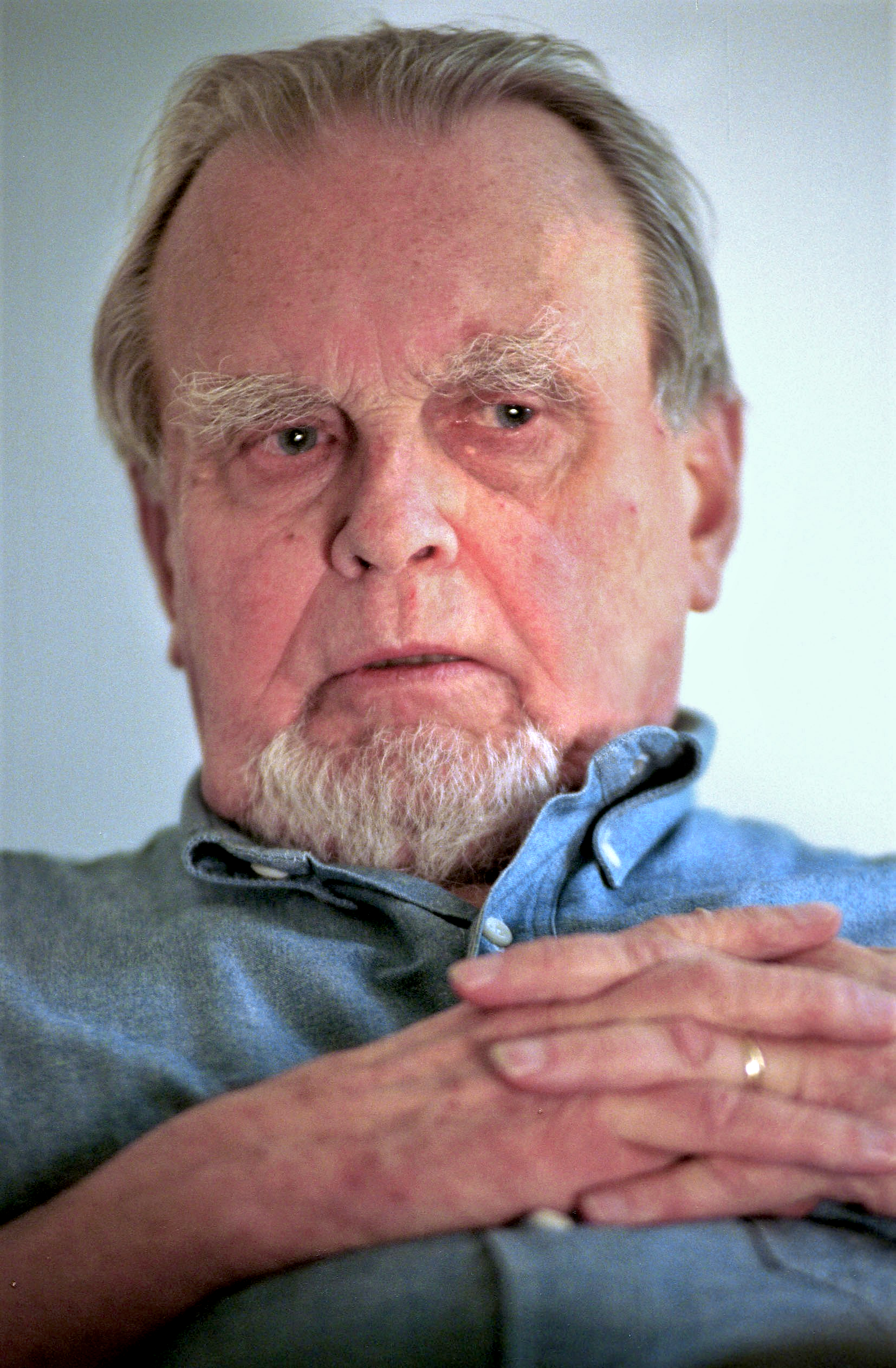
Czesław Miłosz

- June 3 – Ellen Corby, American actress (d. 1999)
- June 4 – Milovan Đilas, Yugoslavian Marxist (d. 1995)
- June 5 – Neel E. Kearby, American fighter ace (d. 1944)
- June 13
  - Luis Walter Alvarez, American physicist, Nobel Prize laureate (d. 1988)
  - Prince Aly Khan, Italian-born Pakistani imam and ambassador (d. 1960)
- June 15 – Wilbert Awdry, English children's writer (d. 1997)
- June 19 – Dudley Senanayake, 2nd Prime Minister of Sri Lanka (d. 1973)
- June 20 – Paul Pietsch, German racer, magazine magnate (d. 2012)
- June 22
  - Marie Braun, Dutch swimmer (d. 1982)
  - Princess Cecilie of Greece and Denmark, wife of Hereditary Grand Duke Georg Donatus of Hesse and sister of Prince Philip, Duke of Edinburgh (d. 1937)
  - Vernon Kirby, South African tennis player (d. 1994)
- June 23 – David Ogilvy, British advertising executive (d. 1999)
- June 24
  - Juan Manuel Fangio, Argentine racing driver (d. 1995)
  - Ernesto Sabato, Argentine writer (d. 2011)
  - Portia White, Canadian opera singer (d. 1968)
- June 25
  - Reed Hadley, American actor (d. 1974)
  - William Howard Stein, American chemist, Nobel Prize laureate (d. 1980)
- June 26 – Babe Didrikson Zaharias, American athlete, golfer (d. 1956)
- June 27 – Marion M. Magruder, American Marines officer (d. 1997)
- June 28
  - Sir Donald Douglas, Scottish surgeon (d. 1993)
  - David Wanklyn, British naval officer, Victoria Cross recipient (MIA 1942)
- June 29
  - Bernard Herrmann, American composer (d. 1975)
  - Prince Bernhard of Lippe-Biesterfeld, German-born Prince Consort of the Netherlands (1948–1980) (d. 2004)
- June 30
  - Czesław Miłosz, Polish-born writer, Nobel Prize laureate (d. 2004)
  - Nagarjun, Indian poet (d. 1998)

=== July ===
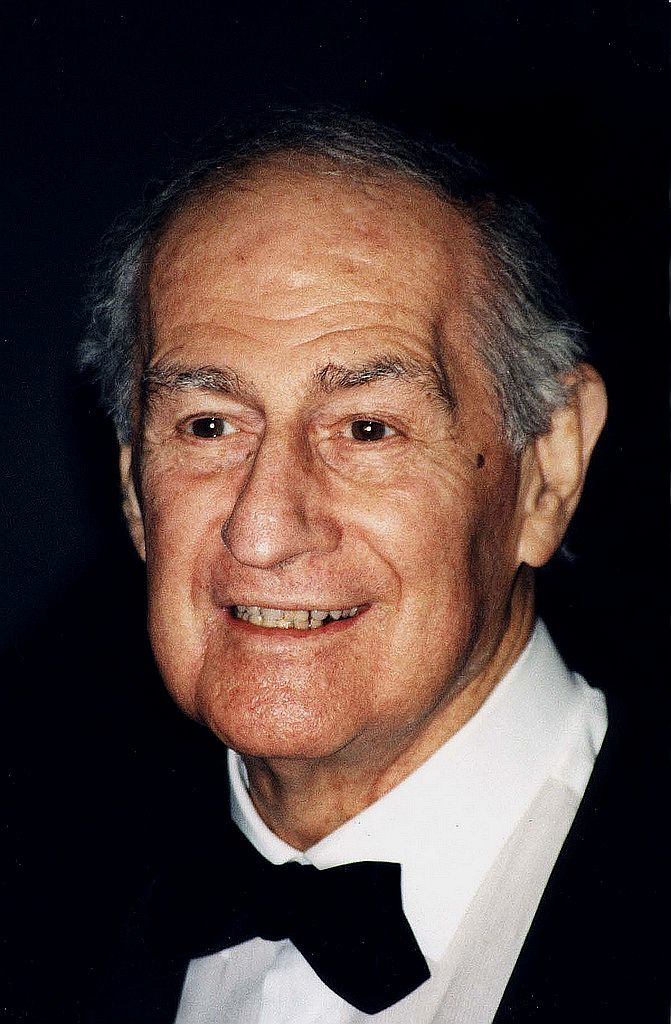
Gian Carlo Menotti

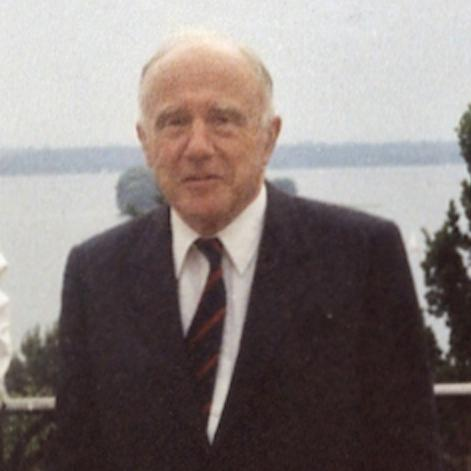
John Archibald Wheeler

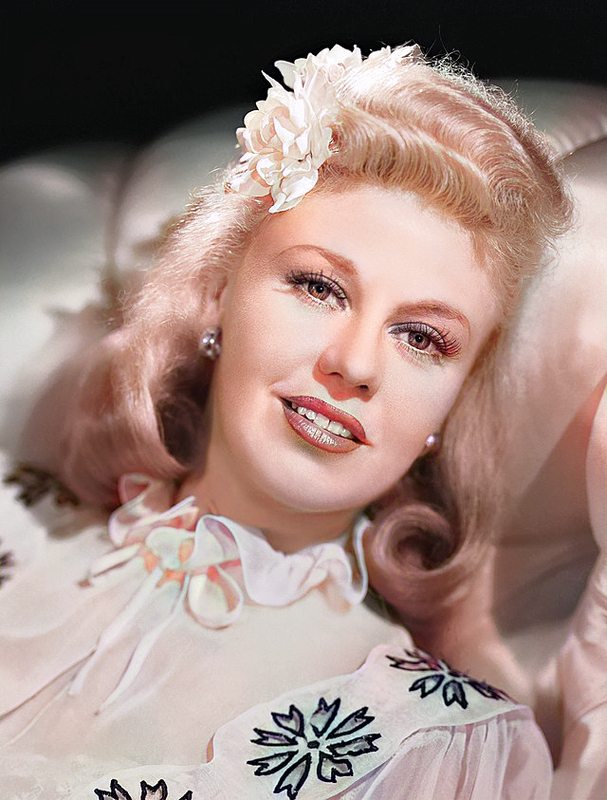
Ginger Rogers

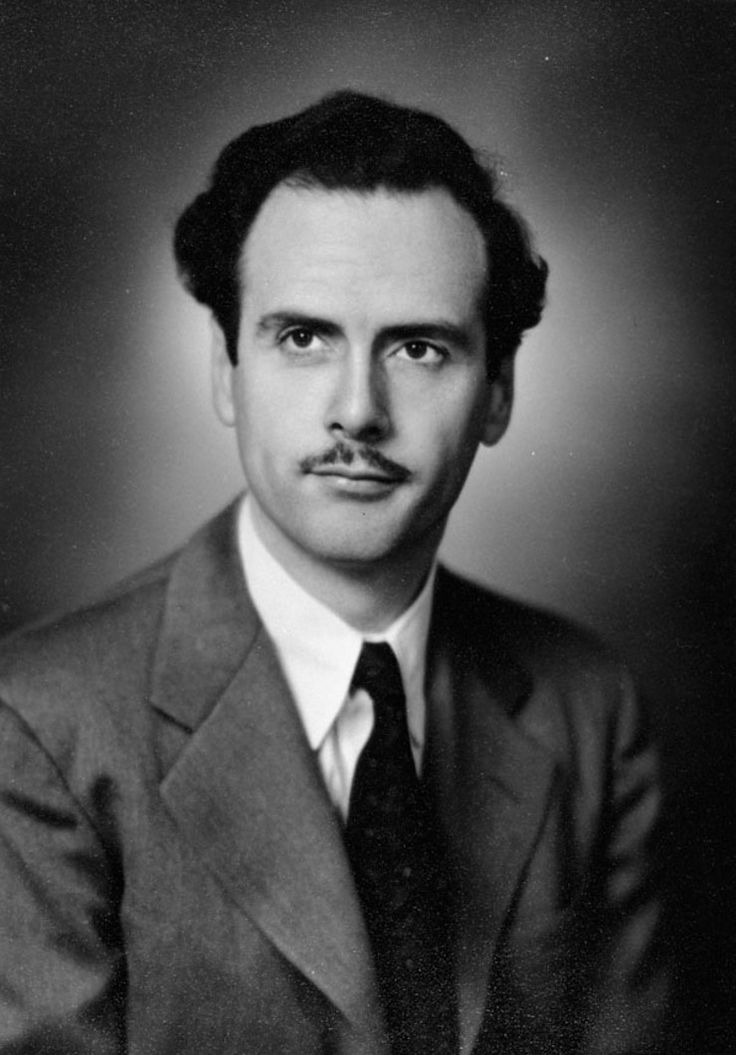
Marshall McLuhan

- July 1 – Sergei Sokolov, Marshal of the Soviet Union (d. 2012)
- July 2 – Reg Parnell, British racing driver and manager (d. 1964)
- July 4
  - Mitch Miller, American singer, television personality (d. 2010)
  - Elizabeth Peratrovich, American civil rights activist (d. 1958)
  - Frederick Seitz, American scientist (d. 2008)
- July 5
  - Costantino Nivola, Italian sculptor (d. 1988)
  - Giorgio Borġ Olivier, 7th Prime Minister of Malta (d. 1980)
  - Georges Pompidou, President of France (d. 1974)
- July 6
  - LaVerne Andrews, American singer (d. 1967)
  - Annibale Frossi, Italian football player, manager (d. 1999)
- July 7
  - Hubert de Bèsche, Swedish diplomat and fencer (d. 1997)
  - Gretchen Franklin, English actress, dancer (d. 2005)
  - Gian Carlo Menotti, Italian-born American composer (d. 2007)
- July 9
  - Mervyn Peake, British writer, illustrator (d. 1968)
  - John Archibald Wheeler, American physicist (d. 2008)
- July 11 – Olive Cotton, Australian photographer (d. 2003)
- July 15 – Hans von Luck, German Nazi Wehrmacht officer (d. 1997)
- July 16 – Ginger Rogers, American actress, dancer (d. 1995)
- July 17 – Yang Jiang, Chinese playwright, author and translator (d. 2016)
- July 18 – Hume Cronyn, Canadian actor (d. 2003)
- July 21 – Marshall McLuhan, Canadian author (d. 1980)
- July 22 – José María Lemus, 33rd President of El Salvador (d. 1993)
- July 28 – Ann Doran, American actress (d. 2000)

=== August ===
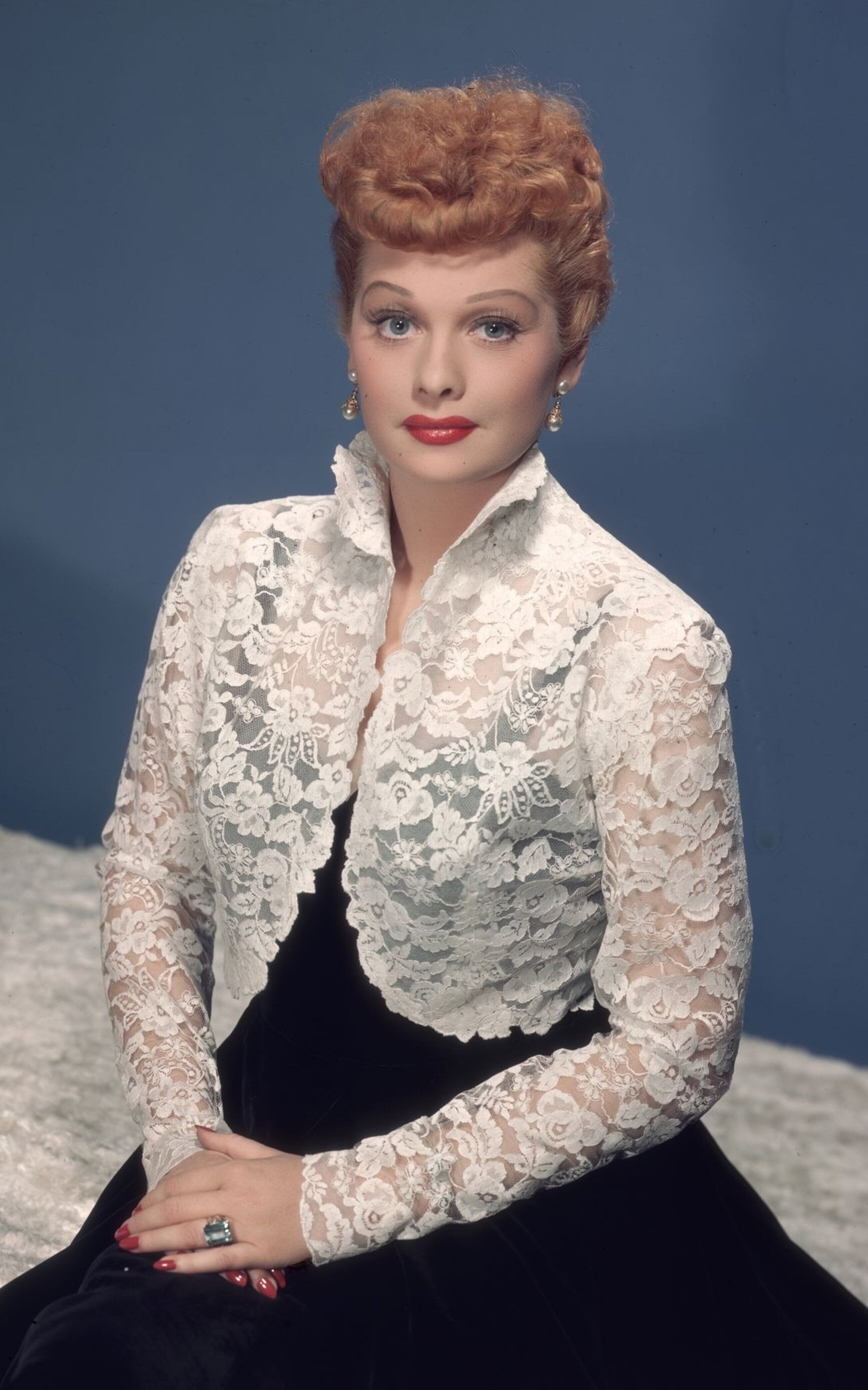
Lucille Ball

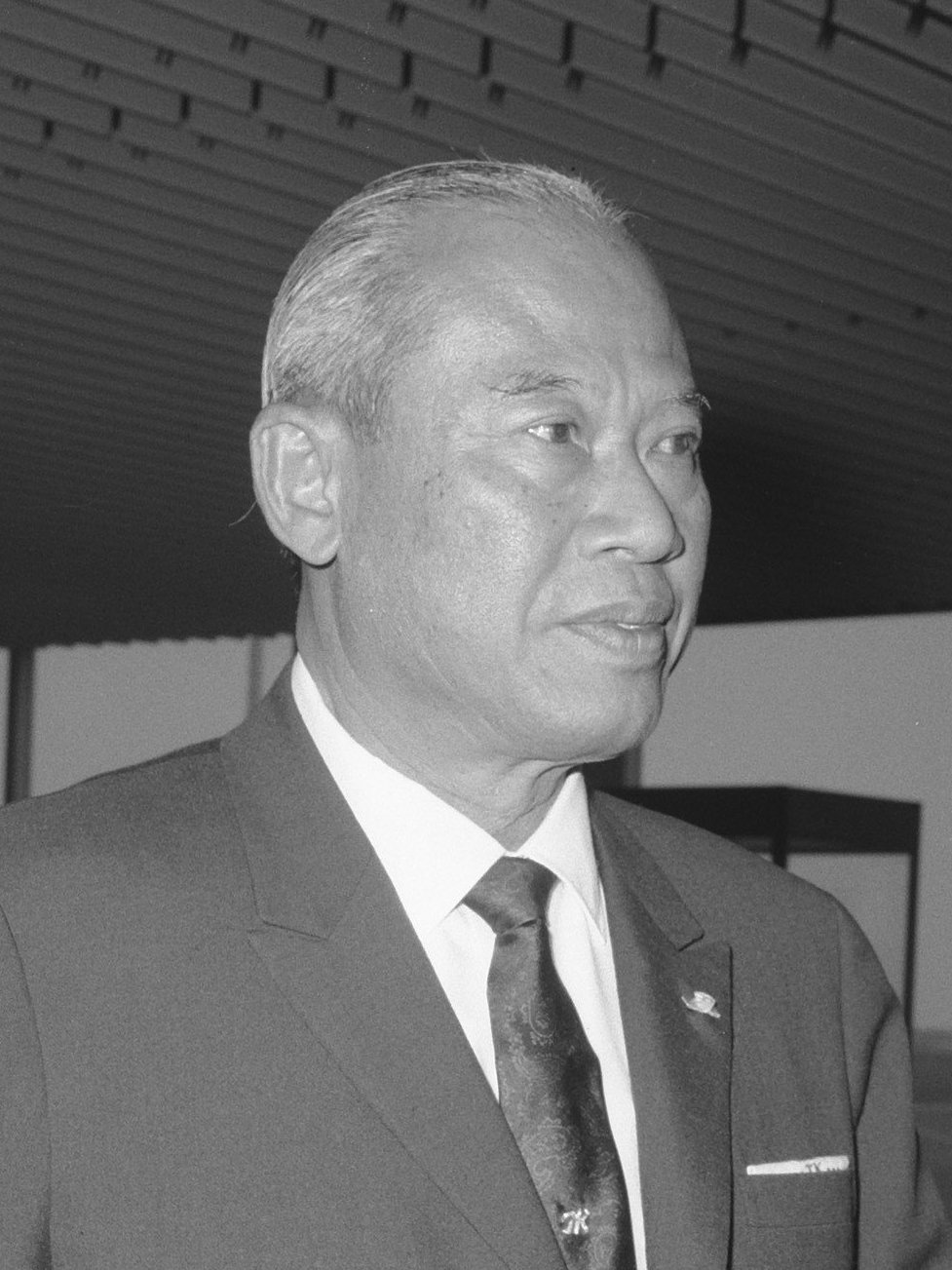
Thanom Kittikachorn

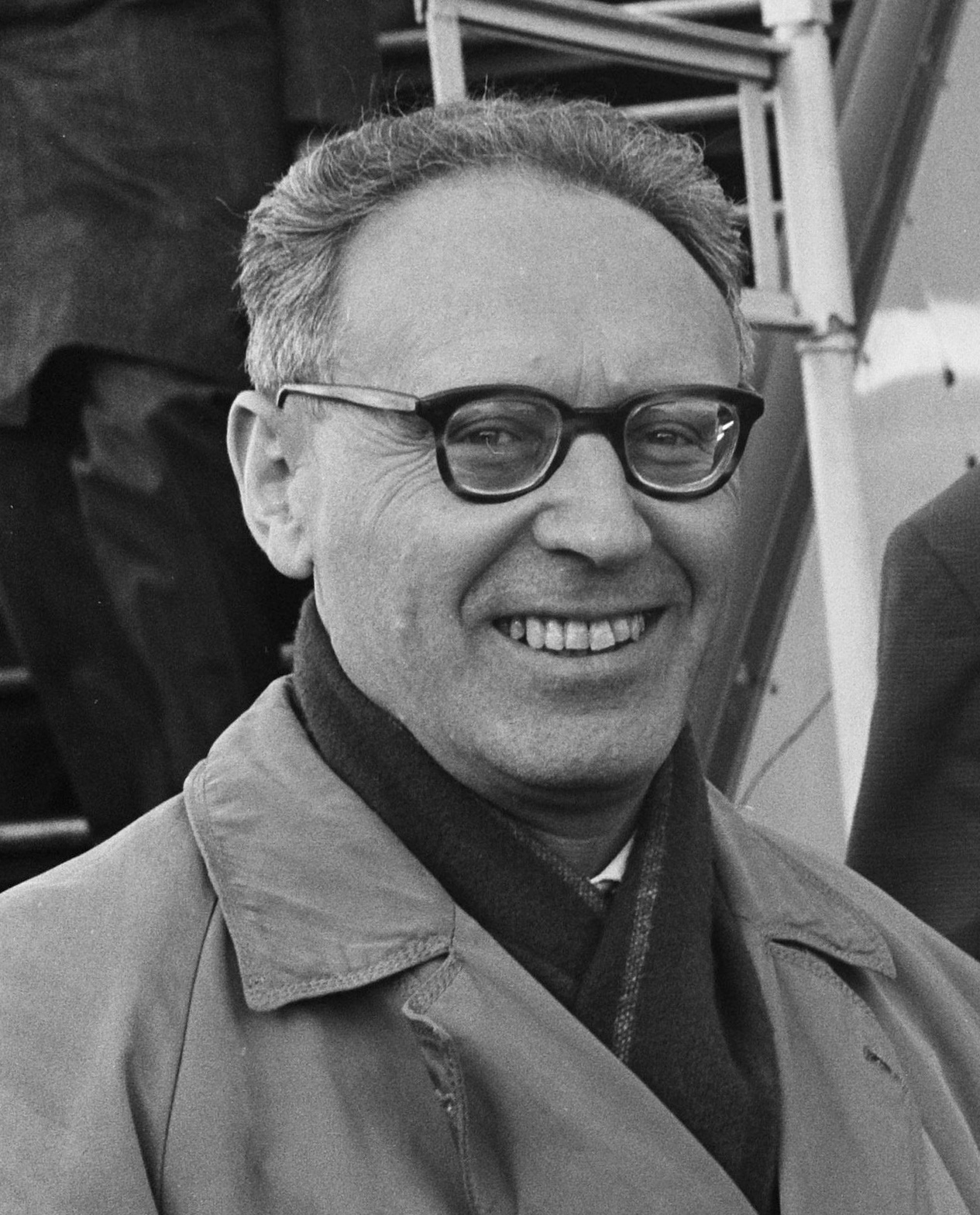
Mikhail Botvinnik

- August 5 – Robert Taylor, American actor (d. 1969)
- August 6 – Lucille Ball, American actress, television producer and co-owner of Desilu Productions (d. 1989)
- August 7 – Nicholas Ray, American film director (d. 1979)
- August 9 – William Alfred Fowler, American physicist, Nobel Prize laureate (d. 1995)
- August 11
  - William H. Avery, American politician (d. 2009)
  - Thanom Kittikachorn, 10th Prime Minister of Thailand (d. 2004)
- August 12 – Cantinflas, Mexican actor (d. 1993)
- August 17
  - Mikhail Botvinnik, Russian chess player, world champion (d. 1995)
  - Martin Sandberger, German military officer and war criminal (d. 2010)
- August 18 – Amelia Boynton Robinson, African-American civil rights activist (d. 2015)
- August 23
  - Betty Robinson, American Olympic athlete (d. 1999)
  - Birger Ruud, Norwegian ski jumper (d. 1998)
- August 25 – Võ Nguyên Giáp, General of the Vietnam People's Army (d. 2013)
- August 29 – John Charnley, English orthopaedic surgeon, pioneer of hip replacement operation (d. 1982)
- August 31 – Ramón Vinay, Chilean operatic tenor (d. 1996)

=== September ===
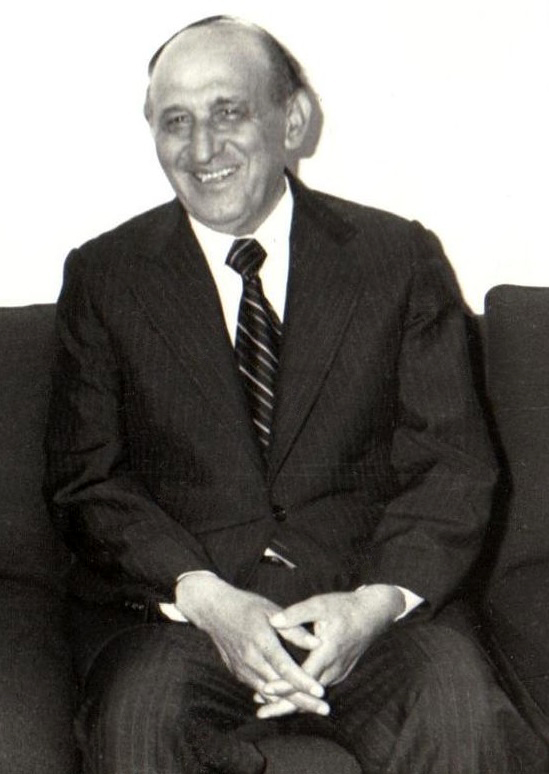
Todor Zhivkov

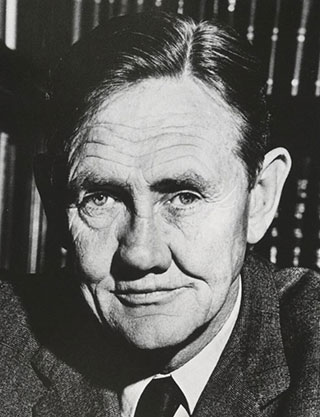
Sir John Gorton

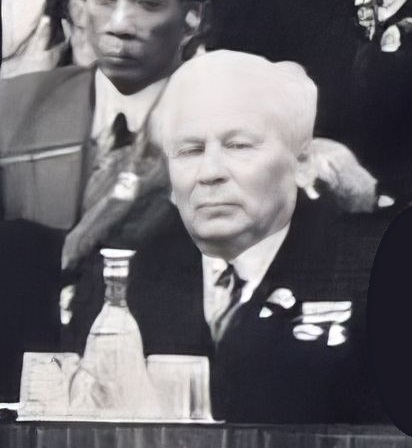
Konstantin Chernenko

- September 2 – Romare Bearden, American artist (d. 1988)
- September 7 – Todor Zhivkov, 36th Prime Minister of Bulgaria (d. 1998)
- September 9
  - Paul Goodman, American author (d. 1972)
  - Sir John Gorton, 19th Prime Minister of Australia (d. 2002)
- September 10 – Nelly Omar, Argentine actress and singer (d. 2013)
- September 13 – Bill Monroe, American musician (d. 1996)
- September 19 – William Golding, English writer, Nobel Prize laureate (d. 1993)
- September 24 – Konstantin Chernenko, General Secretary of the Central Committee of the Communist Party of the Soviet Union (d. 1985)
- September 25 – Eric Williams, 1st Prime Minister of Trinidad and Tobago (d. 1981)
- September 29 – Charles Court, Australian politician (d. 2007)

=== October ===
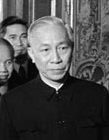
Lê Đức Thọ

- October 5 – Flann O'Brien, Irish humourist (d. 1966)
- October 9 – Joe Rosenthal, American photographer (d. 2006)
- October 10 – Clare Hollingworth, English journalist (d. 2017)
- October 12 – Vijay Merchant, Indian cricketer (d. 1987)
- October 13
  - Tadeusz Chyliński, Polish aircraft designer and constructor (d. 1978)
  - Ashok Kumar, Indian actor (d. 2001)
- October 14 – Lê Đức Thọ, Vietnamese general and politician, recipient of the Nobel Peace Prize (d. 1990)
- October 15 – James H. Schmitz, German-born American science fiction writer (d. 1981)
- October 26
  - Sid Gillman, American football coach (d. 2003)
  - Mahalia Jackson, African-American gospel singer (d. 1972)
- October 30 – Eileen Whelan, English cricketer and supercentenarian (d. 2021)

=== November ===
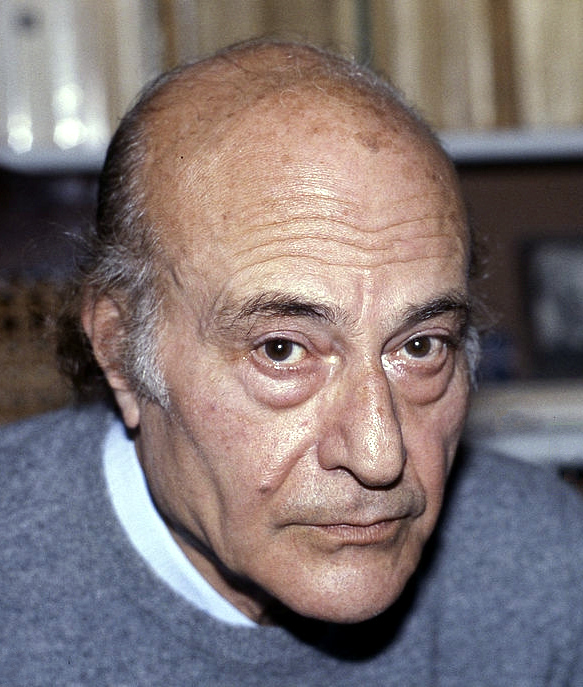
Odysseas Elytis

- November 1
  - Henri Troyat, French writer (d. 2007)
  - Sidney Wood, American tennis player (d. 2009)
  - Shi Ping, Chinese academic, political administrator, and supercentenarian (d. 2024)
- November 2 – Odysseas Elytis, Greek writer, Nobel Prize laureate (d. 1996)
- November 4 – Violet Biever, American politician (d. 2010)
- November 5 – Roy Rogers, American singer, actor (d. 1998)
- November 7 – Yolande Beekman, French-born World War II heroine (d. 1944)
- November 11 – Rubén Cobos, American linguist, folklorist, singer, and professor (d. 2010)
- November 12 – Chad Varah, British priest and humanitarian (d. 2007)
- November 13 – Buck O'Neil, American baseball player, manager (d. 2006)
- November 15 – Kay Walsh, British actress (d. 2005)
- November 27
  - David Merrick, American theater producer (d. 2000)
  - Fe del Mundo, Filipino paediatrician (d. 2011)
- November 30 – Jorge Negrete, Mexican singer and actor (d. 1953)

=== December ===
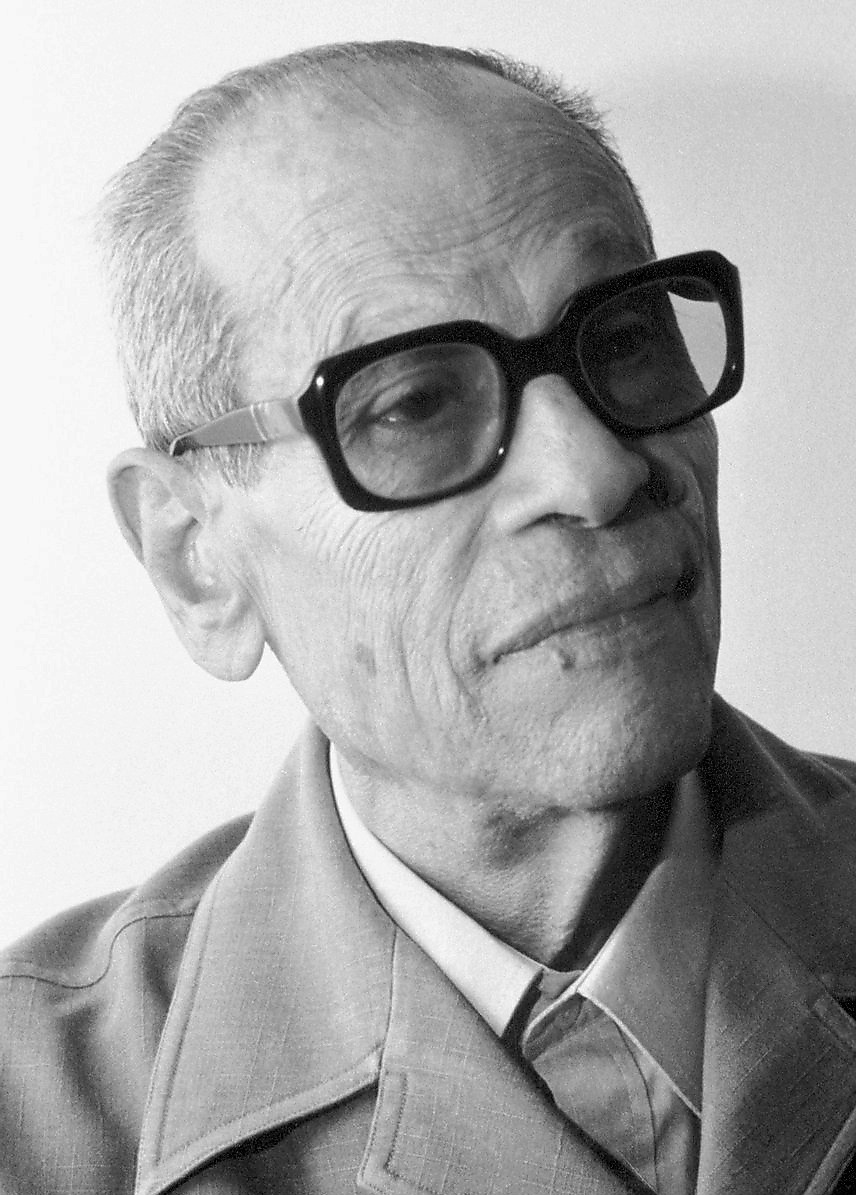
Naguib Mahfouz

- December 1 – Walter Alston, American baseball player, manager (d. 1984)
- December 3 – Nino Rota, Italian composer (d. 1979)
- December 5 – Władysław Szpilman, Polish pianist, memoirist (d. 2000)
- December 8 – Lee J. Cobb, American actor (d. 1976)
- December 9 – Broderick Crawford, American actor (d. 1986)
- December 11
  - Val Guest, British film director (d. 2006)
  - Naguib Mahfouz, Egyptian writer, Nobel Prize laureate (d. 2006)
  - Qian Xuesen, Chinese scientist (d. 2009)
- December 13
  - Trygve Haavelmo, Norwegian economist, Nobel Prize laureate (d. 1999)
  - Kenneth Patchen, American poet and painter (d. 1972)
- December 14
  - Jerzy Iwanow-Szajnowicz, Greek-Polish athlete, Resistance member (d. 1943)
  - Spike Jones, American musician (d. 1965)
  - Hans von Ohain, German physicist, designer of the first operational jet engine (d. 1998)
- December 15 – Stan Kenton, American jazz pianist, composer and arranger (d. 1979)
- December 18 – Jules Dassin, American director (d. 2008)
- December 21 – Josh Gibson, African-American baseball player (d. 1947)
- December 23 – Niels Kaj Jerne, English-born Danish immunologist, Nobel Prize laureate (d. 1994)
- December 25 – Louise Bourgeois, French-born American artist (d. 2010)
- December 26 – Kikuko, Princess Takamatsu of Japan (d. 2004)
- December 27
  - Abdul Halim, Indonesian politician, 4th Prime Minister of Indonesia (d. 1987)
  - Anna Russell, British comedian and singer (d. 2006)
- December 29 – Klaus Fuchs, German theoretical physicist, spy (d. 1988)
- December 30 – Jeanette Nolan, American actress (d. 1998)

== Deaths ==
=== January ===
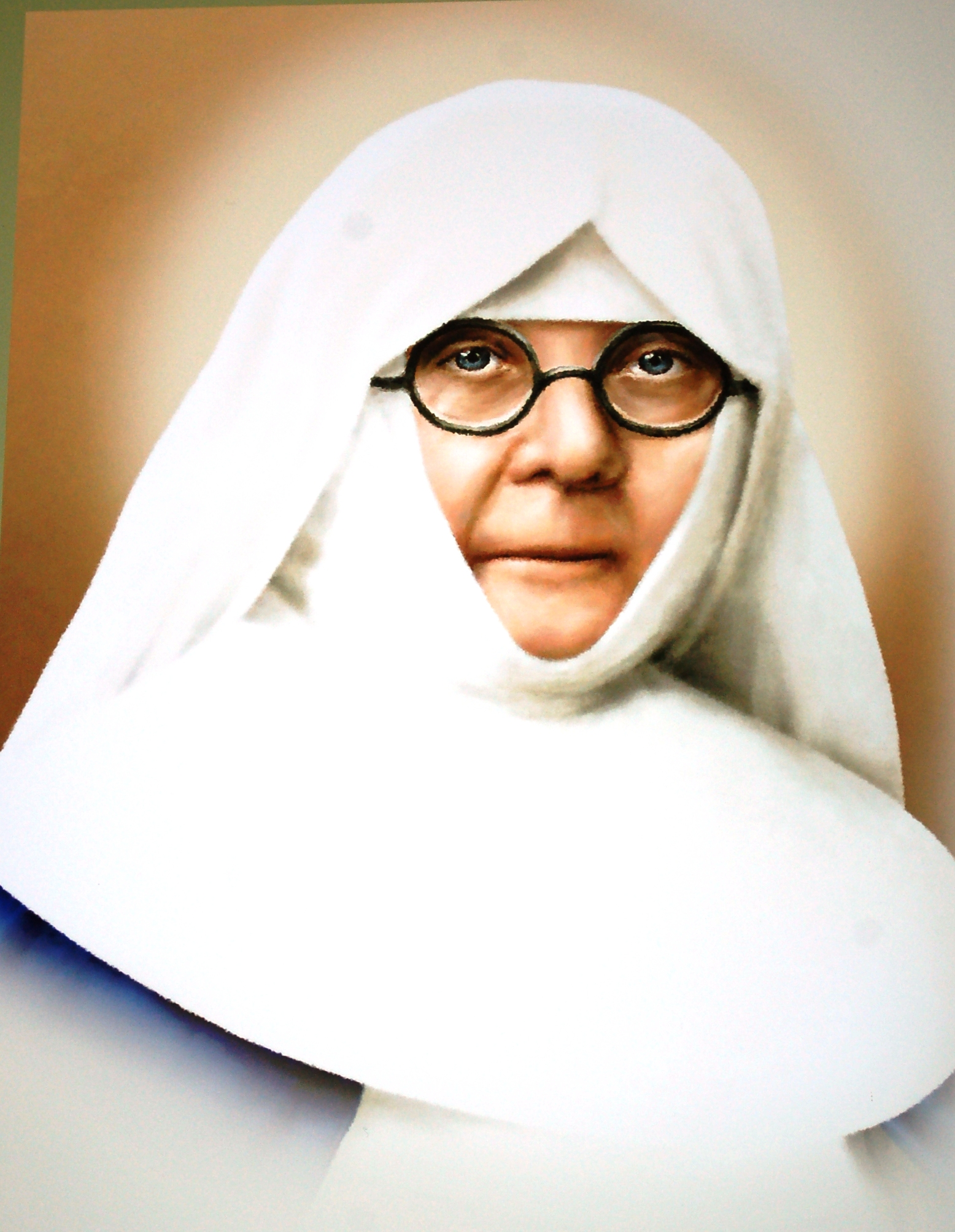
Marcelina Darowska

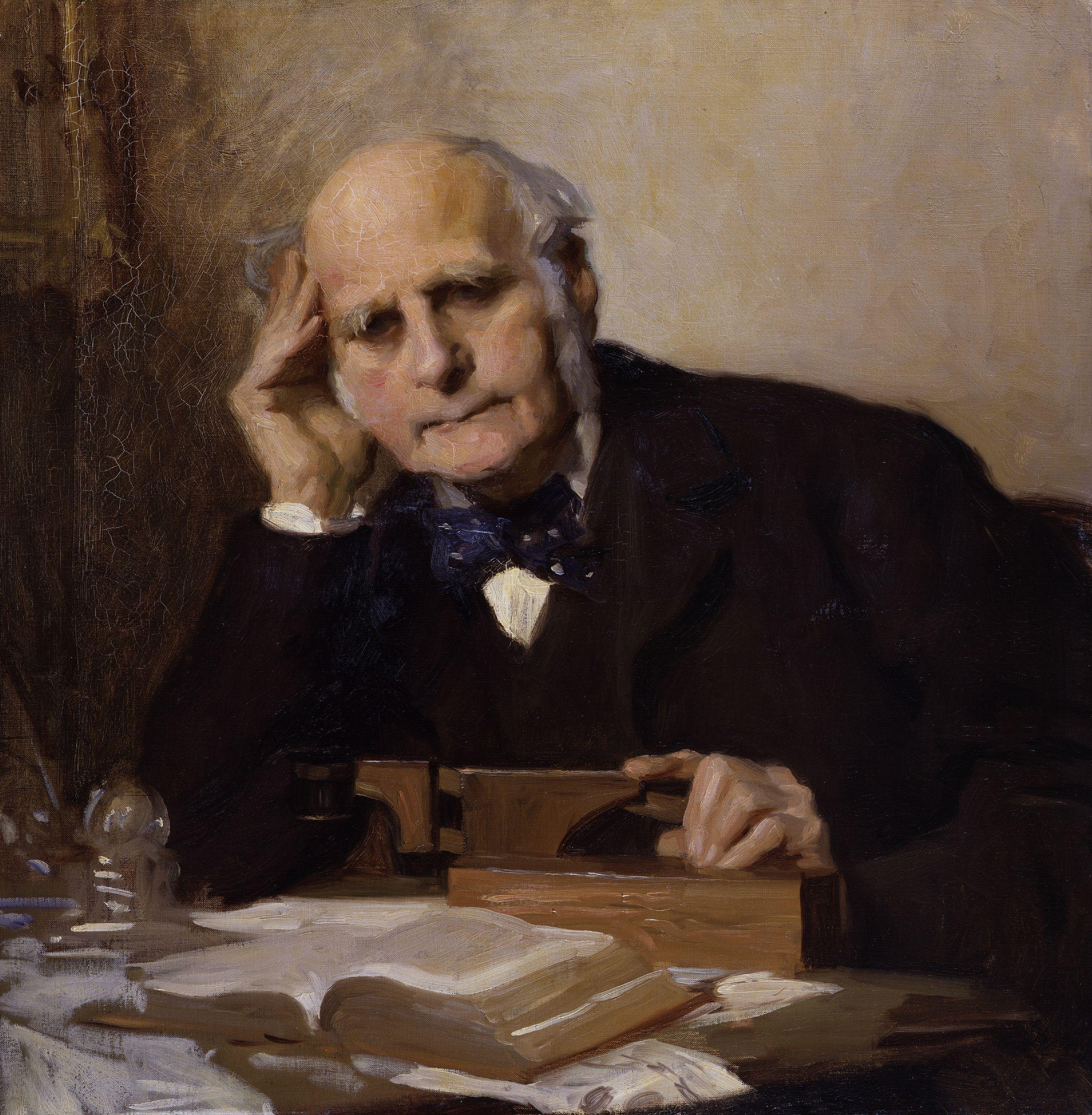
Sir Francis Galton

- January 1 – John I. Curtin, American general (b. 1837)
- January 3
  - 'Abd al-Ahad Khan, Emir of Bukhara (b. 1859)
  - Alexandros Papadiamantis, Greek poet (b. 1851)
- January 4
  - Stefano Bruzzi, Italian painter (b. 1835)
  - Francesco Segna, Italian Roman Catholic cardinal (b. 1836)
- January 5
  - Walter Beatty, Canadian political figure (b. 1836)
  - Marcelina Darowska, Polish Roman Catholic nun, saint (b. 1827)
- January 6 – Sir John Aird, 1st Baronet, English civil engineer (b. 1833)
- January 8 – Pietro Gori, Italian lawyer, journalist and poet (b. 1865)
- January 12 – Georg Jellinek, Austrian legal philosopher (b. 1851)
- January 13 – Władysław Czachórski, Polish painter (b. 1850)
- January 15 – Carolina Coronado, Spanish poet (b. 1820)
- January 17 – Sir Francis Galton, British explorer, biologist (b. 1822)
- January 23 – Edmund Beswick, English rugby football player (b. 1858)

=== February ===
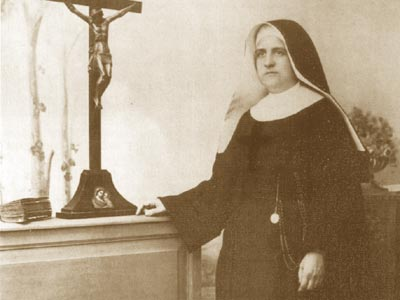
Saint Giuditta Vannini

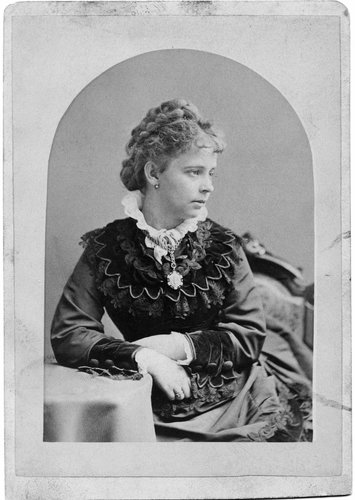
Alice Morse Earle

- February 1 – Charles Stillman Sperry, American admiral (b. 1847)
- February 2 – Archduke Johann Salvator of Austria (b. 1852)
- February 4
  - Piet Cronjé, Boer general (b. 1836)
  - John W. Blaisdell, American stage actor (b. 1840)
- February 8 – Joaquín Costa, Spanish politician, lawyer, economist and historian (b. 1846)
- February 10 – Gustavo Maria Bruni, Italian childhood Roman Catholic servant of God (b. 1903)
- February 14 – David Boyle, Canadian archaeologist (b. 1842)
- February 15
  - Theodor Escherich, German-born Austrian pediatrician (b. 1857)
  - Pavel Grigorievich Dukmasov, Russian general (b. 1838)
- February 16 – Alice Morse Earle, American historian (b. 1851)
- February 18 – Buttons Briggs, American baseball player (b. 1875)
- February 21 – Isidre Nonell, Spanish painter (b. 1873)
- February 23
  - Richard Henry Beddome, British military officer, naturalist (b. 1830)
  - Giuditta Vannini, Italian Roman Catholic religious professed, blessed (b. 1859)
- February 25 – Fritz von Uhde, German painter (b. 1848)

=== March ===
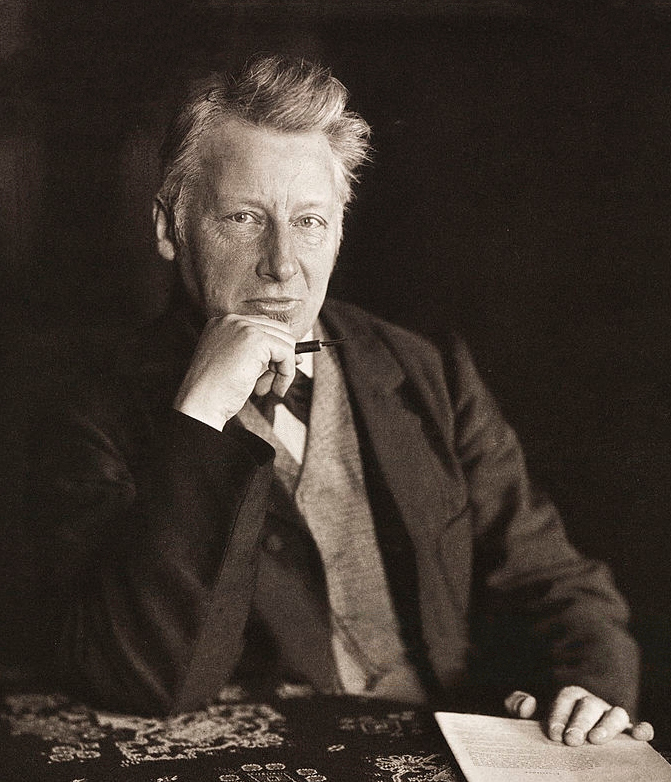
Jacobus Henricus van 't Hoff

Dragan Tsankov

- March 1 – Jacobus Henricus van 't Hoff, Dutch chemist, Nobel Prize laureate (b. 1852)
- March 6
  - Mary Anne Barker, English author (b. 1831)
  - Thierry, Count of Limburg Stirum, Belgian historian (b. 1827)
- March 11 – Théotime Blanchard, Canadian farmer, teacher, merchant and politician (b. 1844)
- March 18
  - Richard Baker, Australian politician (b. 1842)
  - Anna Brackett, American feminist, educator (b. 1836)
- March 21 – Shams-ul-haq Azeemabadi, Indian Islamic scholar (b. 1857)
- March 22 – William Collins, British Anglican bishop (b. 1867)
- March 24
  - Rodolphe-Madeleine Cleophas Dareste de La Chavanne, French jurist (b. 1824)
  - Dragan Tsankov, Bulgarian politician, 3rd Prime Minister of Bulgaria (b. 1828)
- March 27 – Margarita Savitskaya, Russian actress (b. 1868)
- March 28 – Samuel Franklin Emmons, American geologist (b. 1841)
- March 30
  - Pellegrino Artusi, Italian businessman (b. 1820)
  - Ellen Swallow Richards, American chemist (b. 1842)

=== April ===
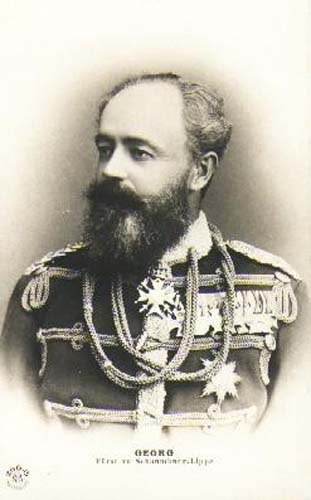
George, Prince of Schaumburg-Lippe

- April 5 – Charles Frederic Moberly Bell, British journalist and newspaper editor (b. 1847)
- April 9 – Manuel Aguirre de Tejada, Spanish politician and lawyer (b. 1827)
- April 10 – Mikalojus Konstantinas Čiurlionis, Lithuanian artist and composer (b. 1875)
- April 12 – James Mathers, Irish missionary (b. 1854)
- April 14
  - Addie Joss, American baseball player, Major League Baseball Hall of Fame member (b. 1880)
  - Denman Thompson, American actor, playwright (b. 1833)
- April 25 – Emilio Salgari, Italian writer (b. 1862)
- April 26 – Pedro Paterno, Filipino politician (b. 1857)
- April 29 – Georg, Prince of Schaumburg-Lippe (b. 1846)

=== May ===
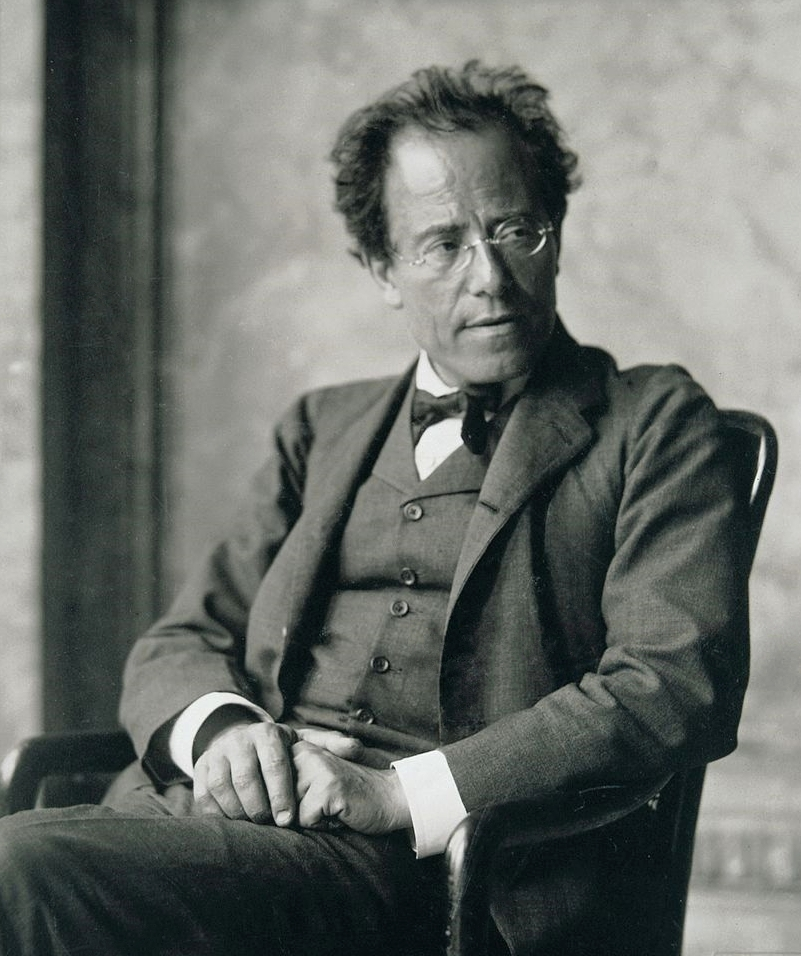
Gustav Mahler

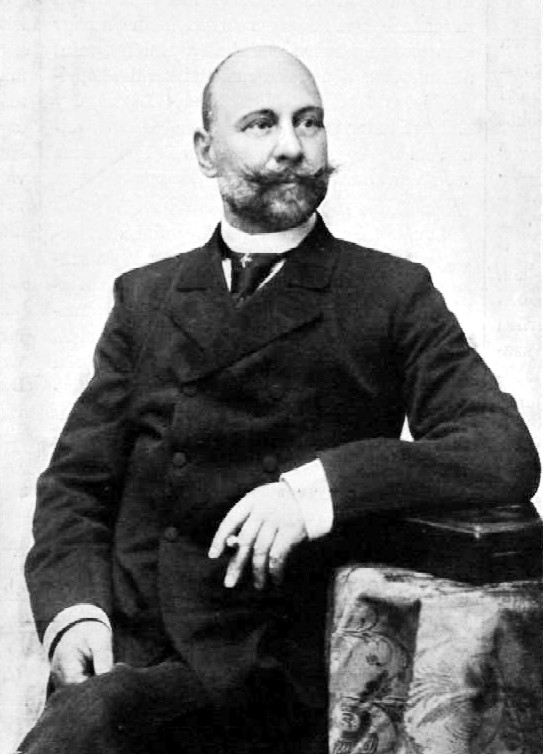
Baron Dezső Bánffy

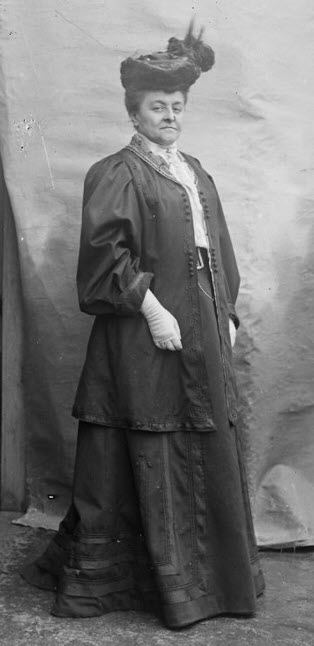
Henriette Delamarre de Monchaux

- May 6
  - Robert Alden, American author (b. 1836)
  - René Vallon, French aviator (b. 1880)
- May 9 – Thomas Wentworth Higginson, American Unitarian minister and abolitionist (b. 1823)
- May 12 – Henriette Delamarre de Monchaux, French naturalist, geologist, paleontologist (b. 1854)
- May 16 – Gheorghe Manu, 17th Prime Minister of Romania (b. 1833)
- May 18 – Gustav Mahler, Austrian composer (b. 1860)
- May 21 – Williamina Fleming, Scottish astronomer (b. 1857)
- May 23 – John Douglas, English architect (b. 1830)
- May 24 – Dezső Bánffy, 12th Prime Minister of Hungary (b. 1843)
- May 25
  - Vasily Klyuchevsky, Russian historian (b. 1841)
  - William Ridley, British missionary (b. 1836)
- May 27 – Thursday October Christian II, Pitcairn Islands leader (b. 1820)
- May 29
  - Benjamin Broomhall, British advocate (b. 1829)
  - Daniel W. Burke, American soldier (b. 1841)
  - Stephanus Jacobus du Toit, South African nationalist, theologian, journalist and politician (b. 1847)
  - W. S. Gilbert, English dramatist (b. 1836)
- May 30 – Milton Bradley, American businessman and board game pioneer (b. 1836)

=== June ===
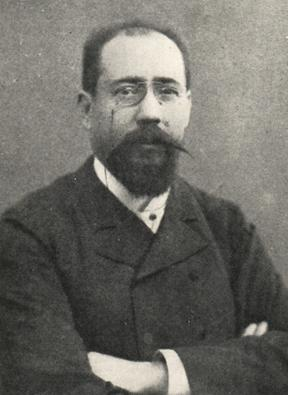
Maurice Rouvier

- June 1 – Claudio Brindis de Salas Garrido, Cuban violinist (b. 1852)
- June 2 – Axel Olof Freudenthal, Finnish philologist, politician (b. 1836)
- June 5 – Édouard Bague, French aviator (b. 1879)
- June 7
  - William Gordon, British Roman Catholic prelate (b. 1831)
  - Maurice Rouvier, French statesman, Prime Minister of France (b. 1842)
- June 9 – Carrie Nation, American temperance activist (b. 1846)
- June 16 – Joshua H. Berkey, American publisher, minister and political activist (b. 1852)
- June 20 – Ghazaros Aghayan, Armenian writer, educator, folklorist, historian, linguist and public figure (b. 1840)
- June 23 – Cecrope Barilli, Italian painter (b. 1839)
- June 25 – Princess Maria Clotilde of Savoy (b. 1843)
- June 26 – Lucy Hughes Brown, American physician (b. 1863)

=== July ===
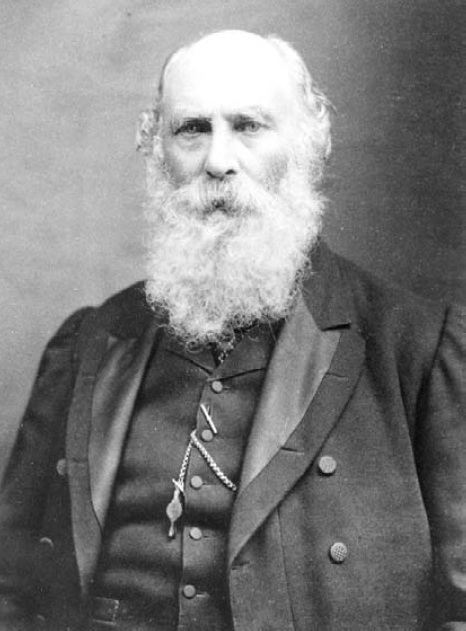
George Johnstone Stoney

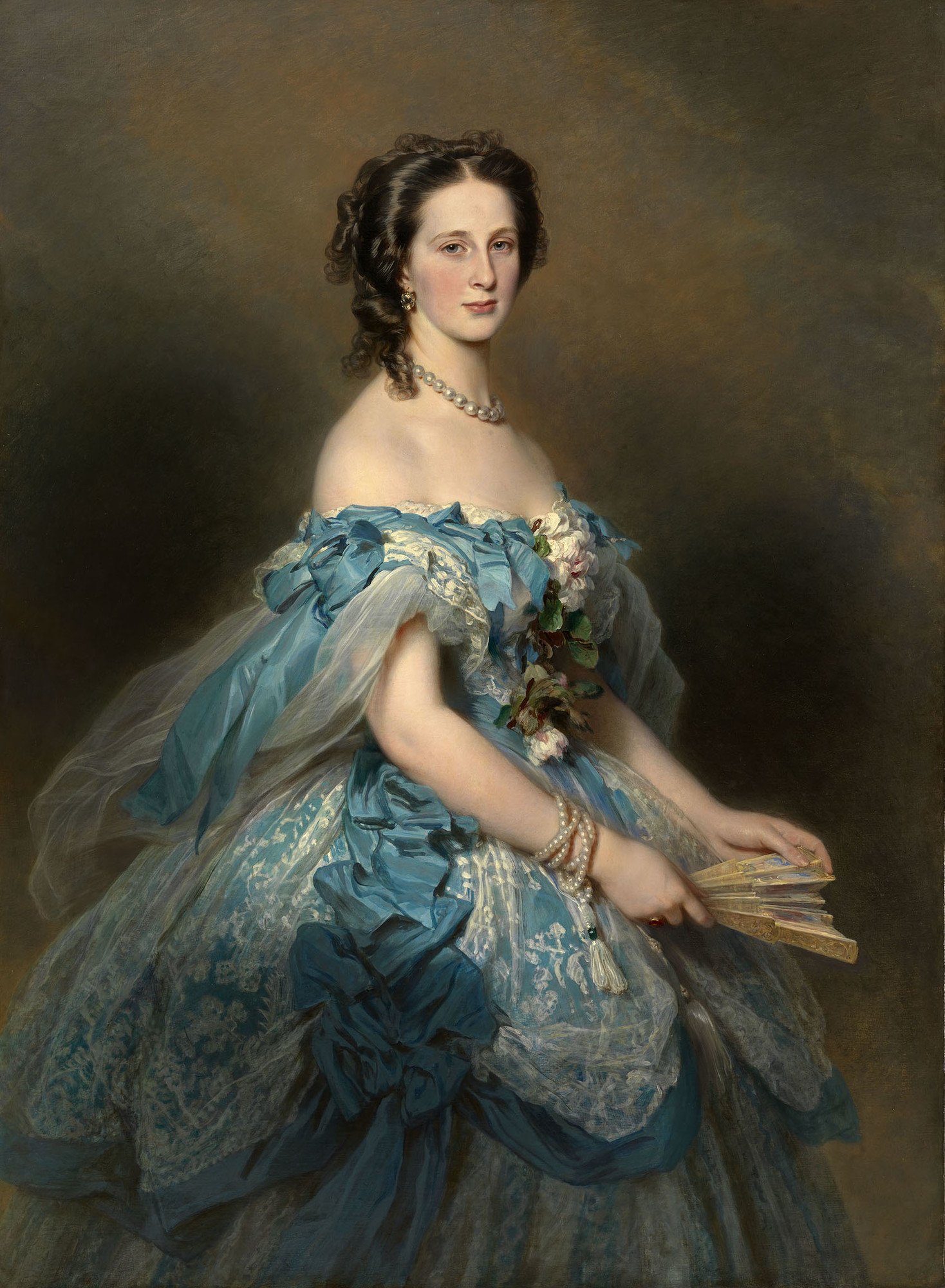
Princess Alexandra of Saxe-Altenburg

- July 2
  - José Dias Correia de Carvalho, Portuguese Roman Catholic bishop (b. 1830)
  - Mary M. Cohen, American social economist (b. 1854)
  - Clement A. Evans, American Confederate general (b. 1833)
- July 5
  - Maria Pia of Savoy, Queen consort of Portugal (b. 1847)
  - George Johnstone Stoney, Irish physicist (b. 1826)
- July 6 – Princess Alexandra of Saxe-Altenburg (b. 1830)
- July 8 – Henry Perrine Baldwin, American businessman (b. 1842)
- July 11 – Laura Jacinta Rittenhouse, American temperance activist and juvenile literature author (b. 1841)
- July 14 – Ignaz von Peczely, Hungarian scientist, physician and homeopath (b. 1826)
- July 15
  - Carlo Ademollo, Italian painter (b. 1824)
  - Louisa Cavendish, Duchess of Devonshire (b. 1832)
- July 16 – August Harambašić, Croatian writer (b. 1861)
- July 17 – Rufino José Cuervo, Colombian linguist, philologist and writer (b. 1844)
- July 19 – Manuel Iradier, Spanish explorer and Africanist (b. 1854)
- July 20 – Caleb Cook Baldwin, American Presbyterian missionary (b. 1820)
- July 25
  - Edmund Bogdanowicz, Polish poet, writer and journalist (b. 1857)
  - Carmen Salles y Barangueras, Spanish Roman Catholic religious professed and saint (b. 1848)
- July 26 – José Alves de Cerqueira César, Brazilian politician (b. 1835)

=== August ===
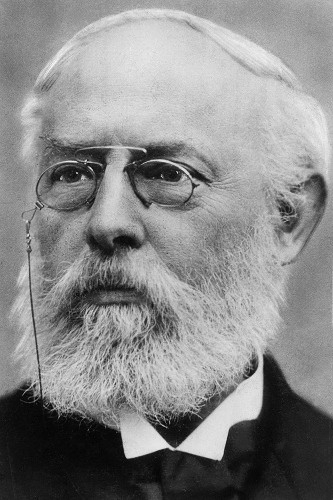
Konrad Duden

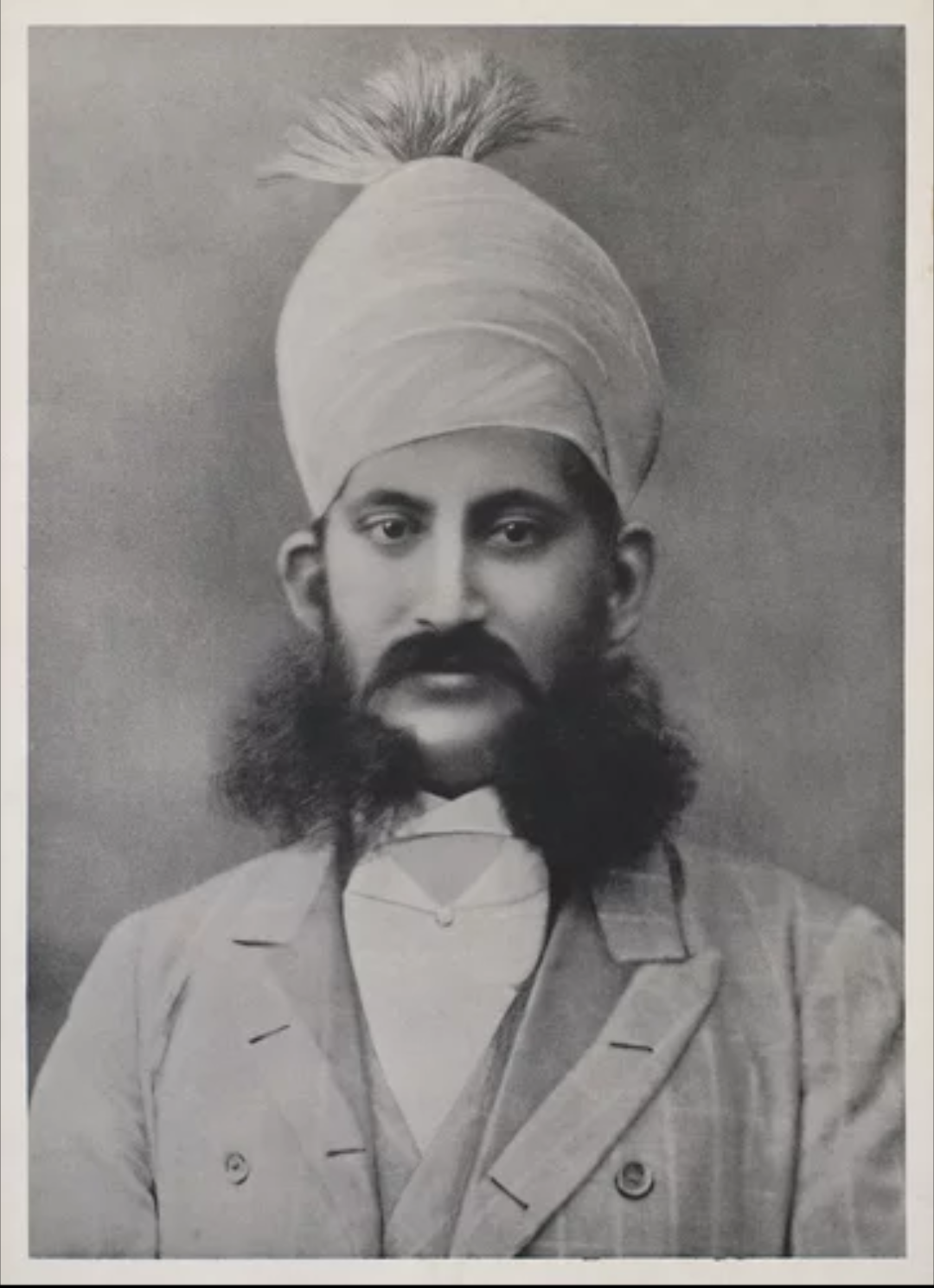
Mahbub Ali Khan

- August 1
  - Edwin Austin Abbey, American painter (b. 1852)
  - Konrad Duden, German philologist (b. 1829)
- August 2 – Ioryi Mucitano, Aromanian revolutionary (b. 1882)
- August 6 – Florentino Ameghino, Argentine naturalist, paleontologist, anthropologist and zoologist (b. 1853)
- August 7
  - Elizabeth Akers Allen, American poet and journalist (b. 1832)
  - José Rafael Balmaceda, Chilean politician, diplomat (b. 1850)
- August 11
  - Isabela de Rosis, Italian Roman Catholic religious sister, servant of God and Venerable (b. 1842)
  - Albert Ladenburg, German chemist (b. 1842)
- August 12 – Jules Brunet, French military leader (b. 1838)
- August 14 – Henry Rathbone, Union Army officer and diplomat (b. 1837)
- August 15 – William R. Badger, American pioneer aviator (b. 1886)
- August 16 – Patrick Francis Moran, Australian cardinal, Archbishop of Sydney (b. 1830)
- August 17 – Petro Nini Luarasi, Albanian activist (b. 1854)
- August 29 – Mahbub Ali Khan of Hyderabad (b. 1886)
- August 31 – Benjamin Grierson, American Civil War general (b. 1826)

=== September ===
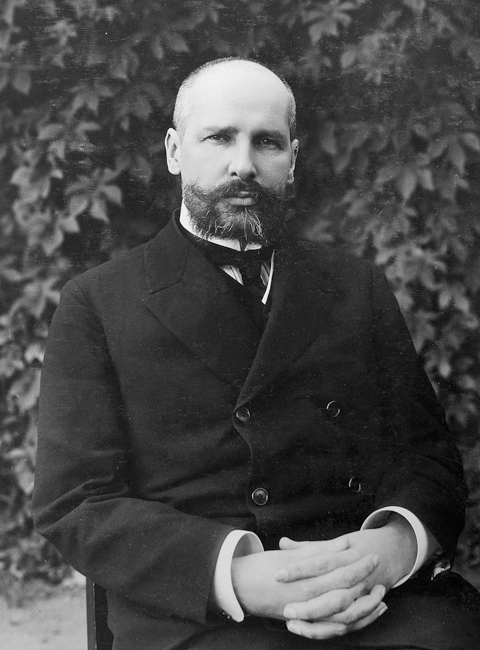
Pyotr Stolypin

- September 4 – John Francon Williams, Welsh-born journalist, writer, geographer, historian, cartographer and inventor (b. 1854)
- September 7 – Friedrich Breitfuss, Russian philatelist (b. 1851)
- September 9 – Francis March, American comparative linguist (b. 1825)
- September 12 – William Alexander, Irish Anglican bishop, Primate of All Ireland (b. 1824)
- September 15 – Joel Benton, American writer, poet and lecturer (b. 1832)
- September 16 – Edward Whymper, British explorer, mountaineer (b. 1840)
- September 18 – Pyotr Stolypin, 3rd Prime Minister of Russia (assassinated) (b. 1862)
- September 20 – Sir Robert Hart, 1st Baronet, British diplomat (b. 1835)
- September 23 – John Arthur Barry, British-born Australian journalist, author (b. 1850)
- September 25 – Emma Helen Blair, American journalist, editor (b. 1851)
- September 29 – Henry Northcote, 1st Baron Northcote, 3rd Governor-General of Australia (b. 1846)
- September 30 – Sir Herbert Risley, British ethnographer and colonial administrator (b. 1851)

=== October ===
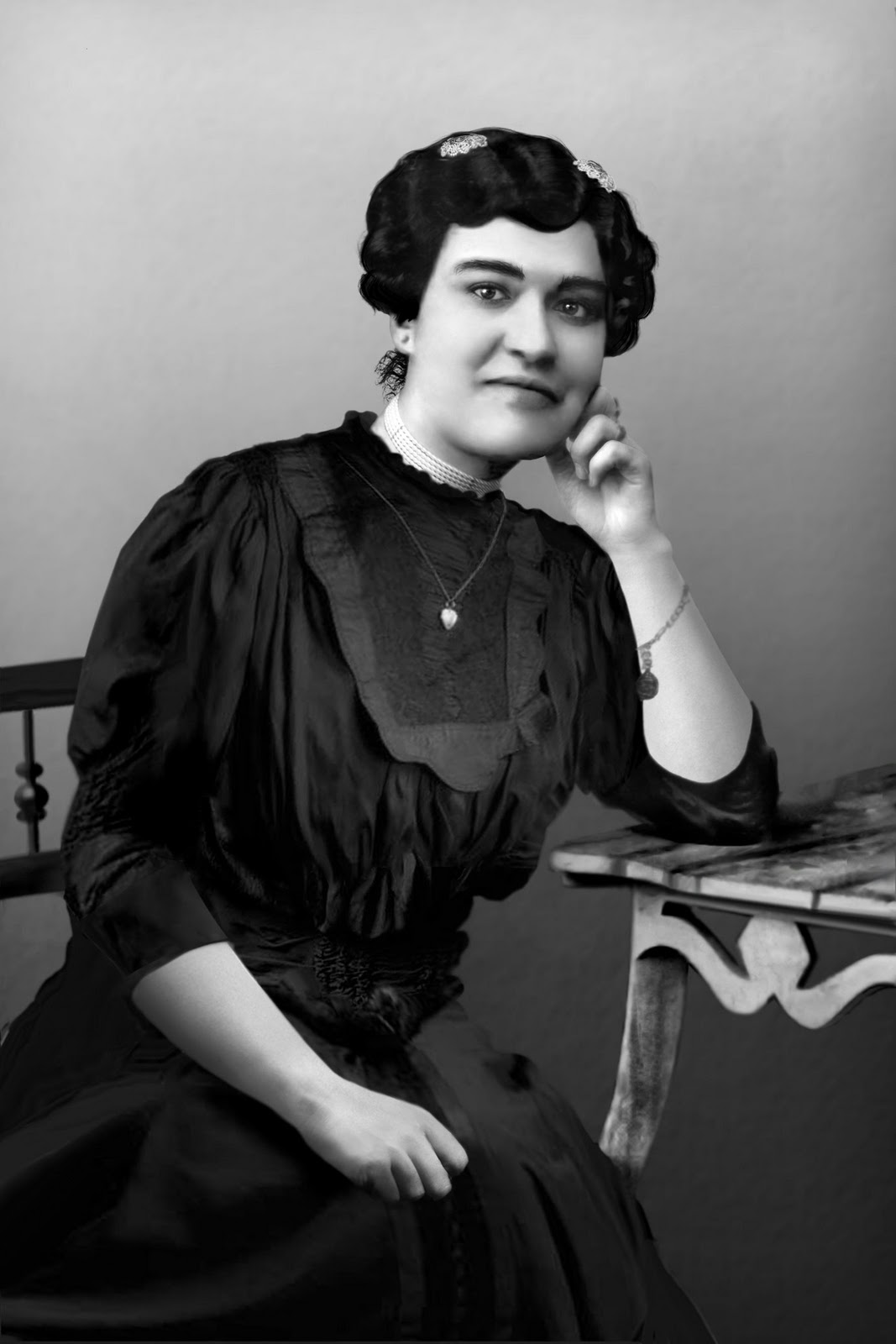
Carolina Beatriz Ângelo

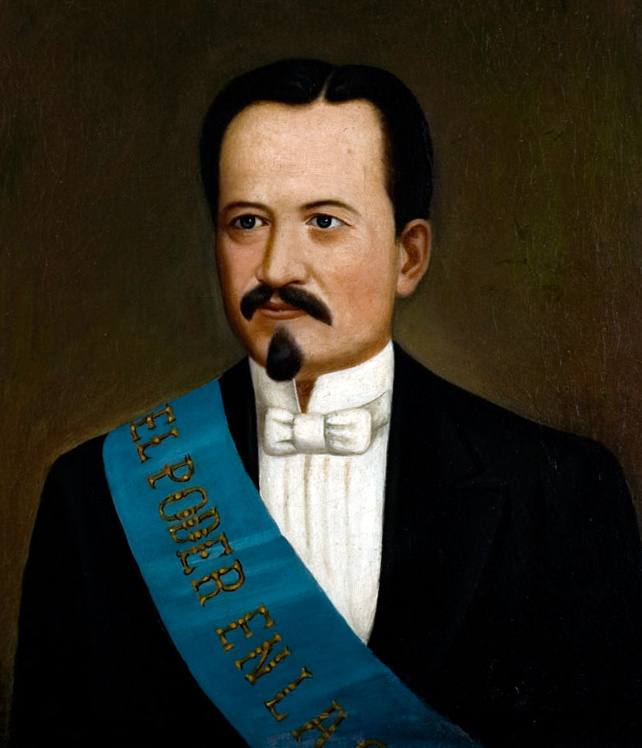
Antonio Borrero

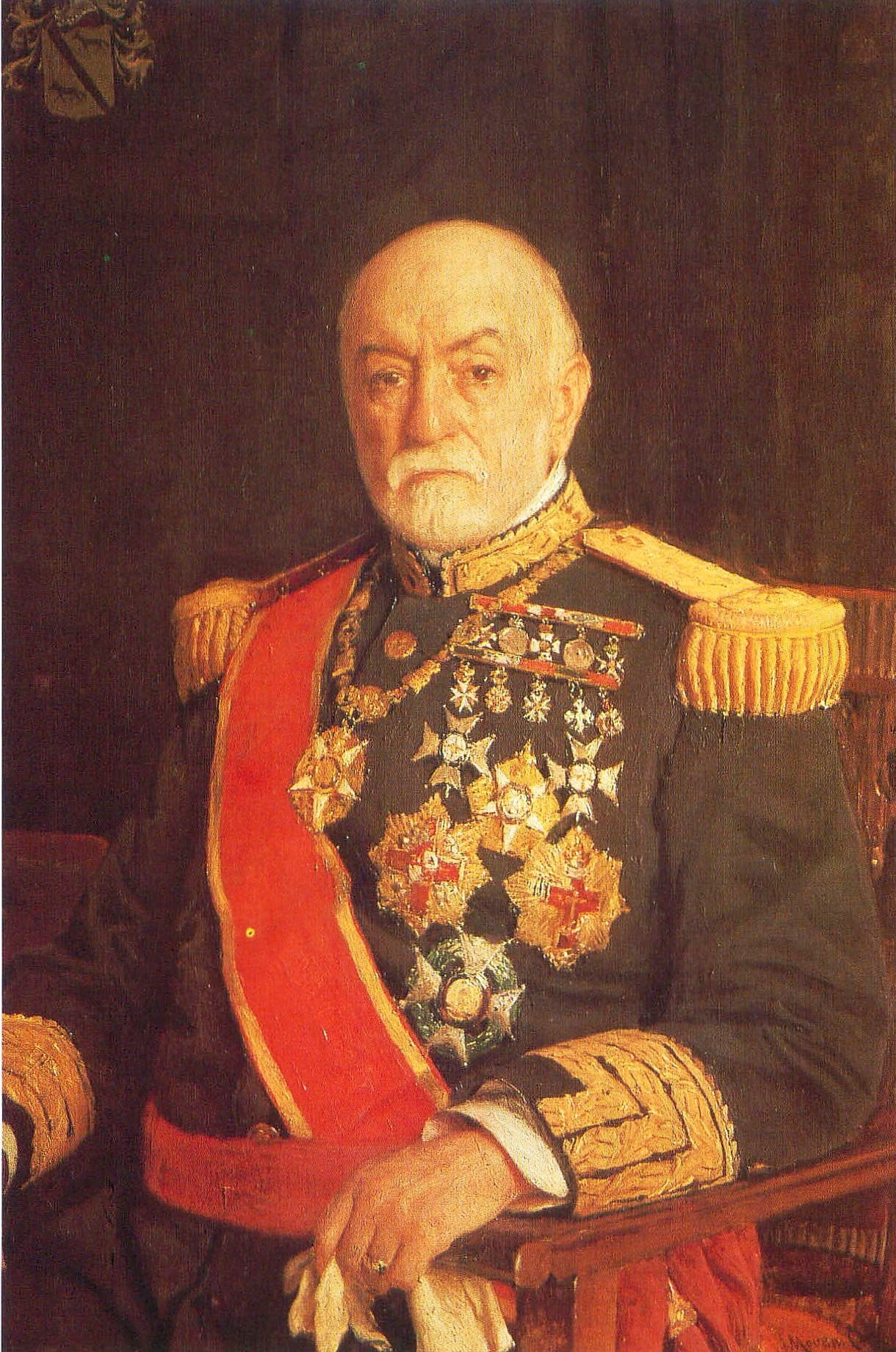
José López Domínguez

- October – Blanche Atkinson, British novelist (b. 1847)
- October 1 – Wilhelm Dilthey, German psychologist, sociologist and philosopher (b. 1833)
- October 2
  - Cromwell Dixon, American aviator (b. 1892)
  - Winfield Scott Schley, American admiral (b. 1839)
- October 3 – Carolina Beatriz Ângelo, Portuguese physician (b. 1878)
- October 5 – William Astley, Australian writer (b. 1855)
- October 7
  - John Hughlings Jackson, English neurologist (b. 1835)
  - Elmer McCurdy, American outlaw (b. 1880)
- October 8 – Lee Batchelor, Australian politician (b. 1865)
- October 9
  - Cornelius Newton Bliss, American merchant, politician and collector (b. 1833)
  - Antonio Borrero, 10th President of Ecuador (b. 1827)
- October 11
  - Dimitar Agura, Bulgarian historian (b. 1849)
  - Henry Broadhurst, British trade unionist, politician (b. 1840)
  - Elena Arellano Chamorro, Nicaraguan pioneer educator (b. 1836)
- October 13 – Miguel Malvar, Filipino general (b. 1865)
- October 14 – John Marshall Harlan, U.S. Supreme Court Justice (b. 1833)
- October 17 – José López Domínguez, Spanish military officer, politician and 24th Prime Minister of Spain (b. 1829)
- October 18 – Alfred Binet, French psychologist (b. 1857)
- October 19 – Eugene Burton Ely, American aviation pioneer (b. 1886)
- October 24 – Ida Lewis, American lighthouse keeper (b. 1842)
- October 27 – Arthur Lloyd, British Anglican missionary (b. 1852)
- October 28 – Clement V. Rogers, Cherokee politician, father of Will Rogers (b. 1839)
- October 29 – Joseph Pulitzer, Hungarian-born newspaper publisher, journalist (b. 1847)
- October 30 – Elizabeth Herbert, Baroness Herbert of Lea, English Catholic writer, translator, philanthropist and social figure (b. 1822)
- October 31 – John Joseph Montgomery, American glider pioneer (b. 1858)

=== November ===
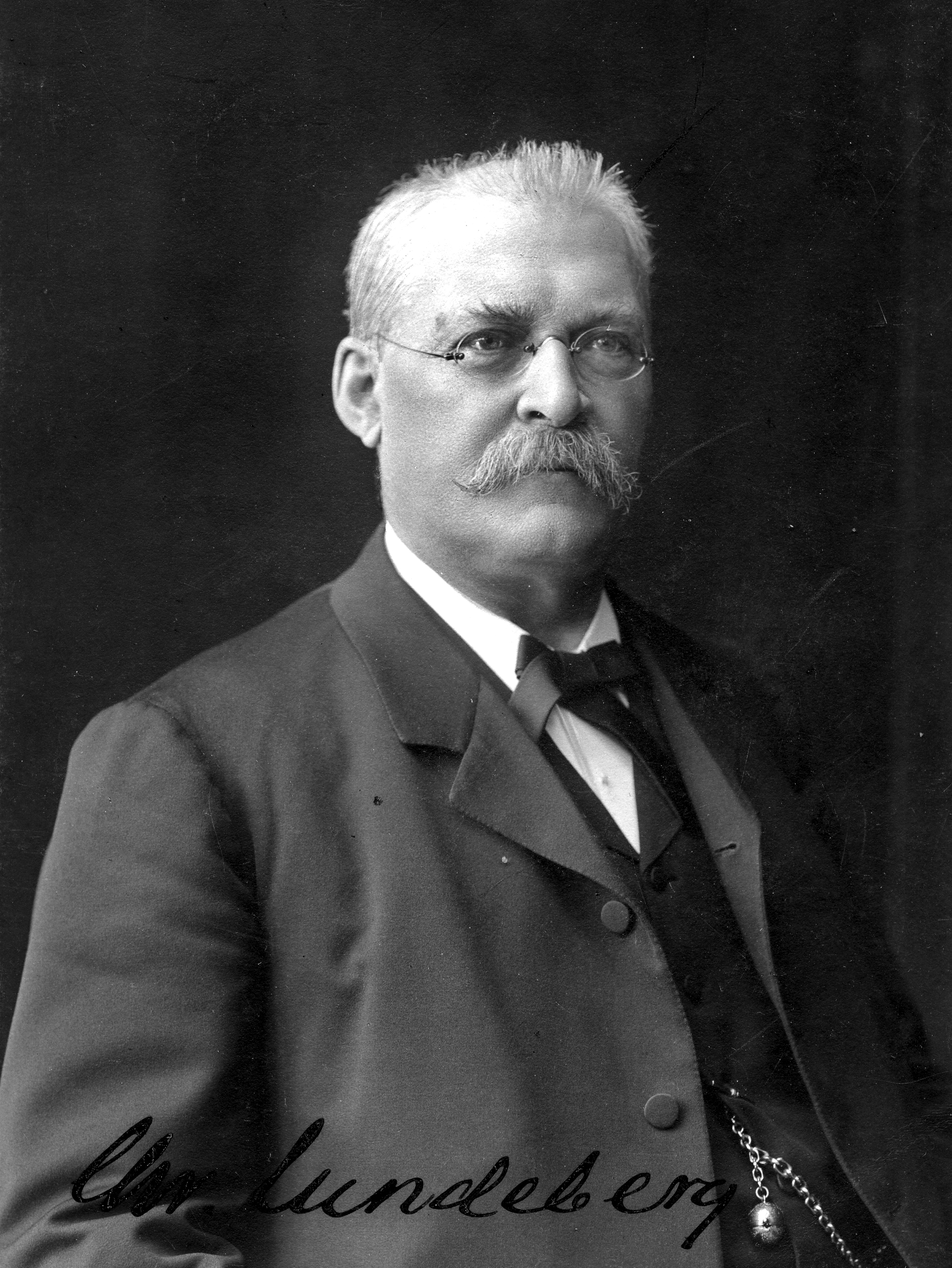
Christian Lundeberg

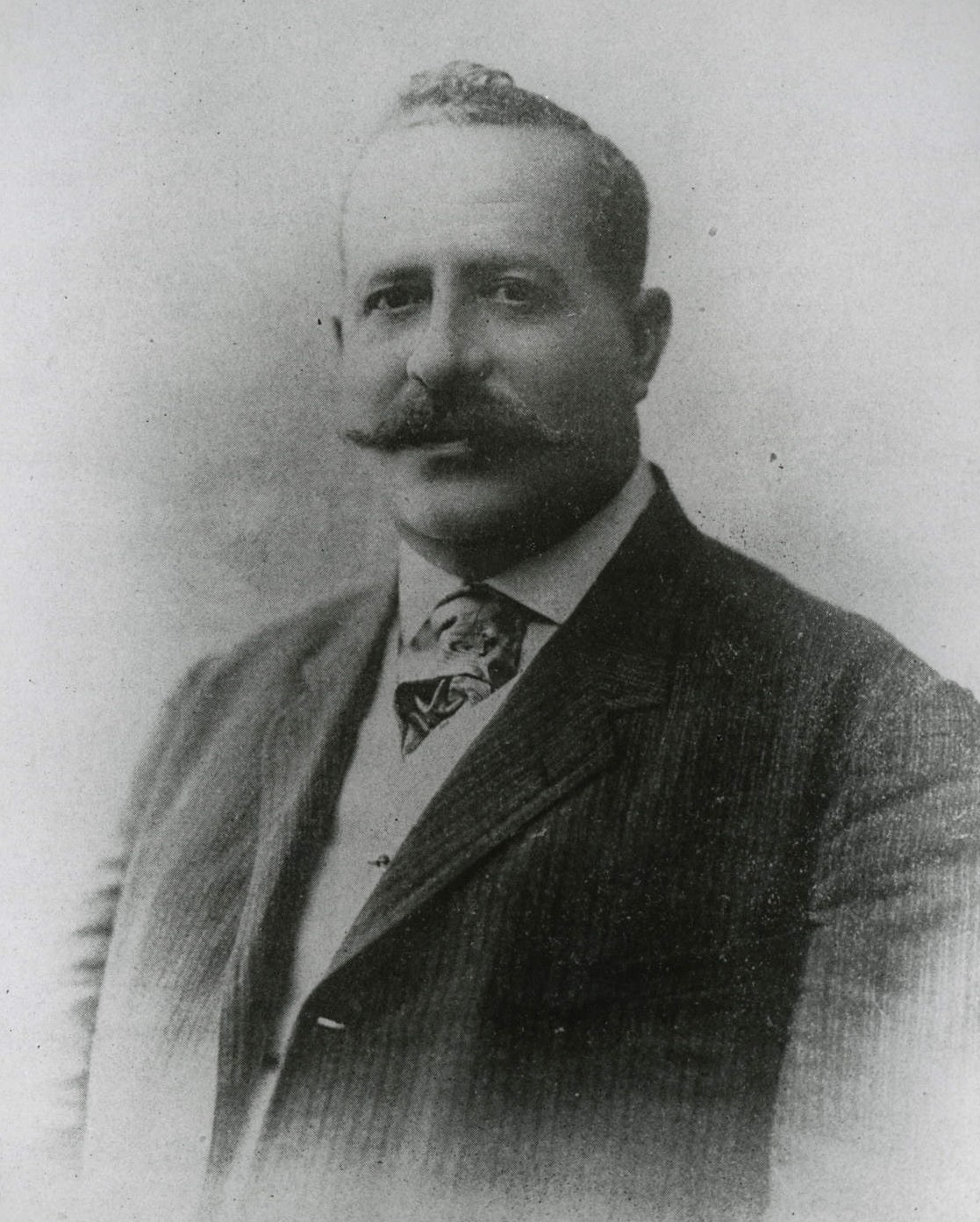
Ramón Cáceres

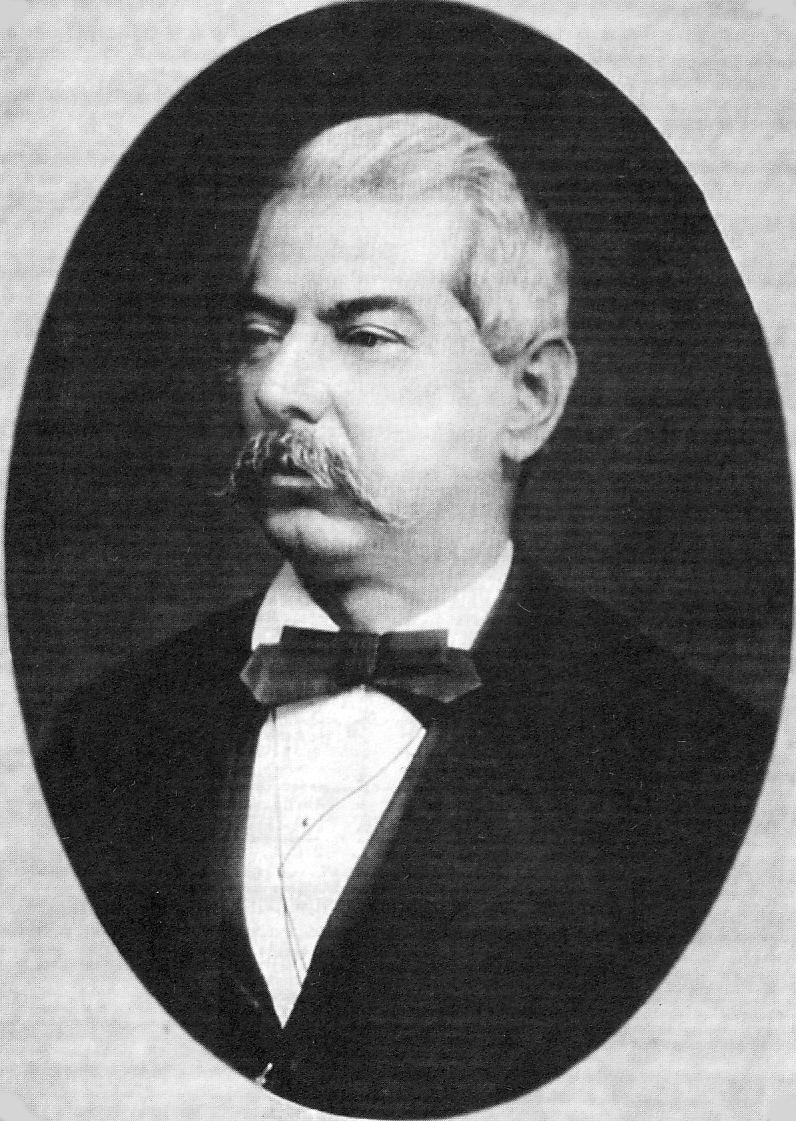
Nikola Hristić

- November 2 – Kyrle Bellew, English actor (b. 1850)
- November 3 – George Chrystal, British mathematician (b. 1851)
- November 7
  - Constantin Budisteanu, Romanian soldier, politician (b. 1838)
  - Nathaniel Bull, Australian politician (b. 1842)
- November 8 – Oscar Bielaski, American baseball player (b. 1847)
- November 9 – Howard Pyle, American artist and fiction writer (b. 1853)
- November 10 – Christian Lundeberg, Swedish politician, 10th Prime Minister of Sweden (b. 1842)
- November 11 – Josef Roman Lorenz, Austrian naturalist (b. 1825)
- November 14 – Francis Buxton, British barrister and politician (b. 1847)
- November 19
  - Billy Beaumont, English football player (b. 1883)
  - Ramón Cáceres, 31st President of the Dominican Republic (b. 1866)
- November 20 – Sophia Frances Anne Caulfeild, British needlework artist (b. 1824)
- November 22
  - William George Aston, British consular official (b. 1841)
  - John Sanford Barnes, American businessman (b. 1836)
- November 23
  - James George Bell, American businessman, settler (b. 1831)
  - Bernard Tancred, South African cricketer (b. 1865)
- November 25 – Paul Lafargue, French Marxist theorist, activist (b. 1842)
- November 26
  - Komura Jutarō, Japanese statesman (b. 1855)
  - Nikola Hristić, Prime Minister of Serbia (b. 1818)
- November 28 – Preston Jacobus, American developer, businessman and politician (b. 1864)
- November 29 – Stanley Calvert Clarke, British army officer, courtier

=== December ===
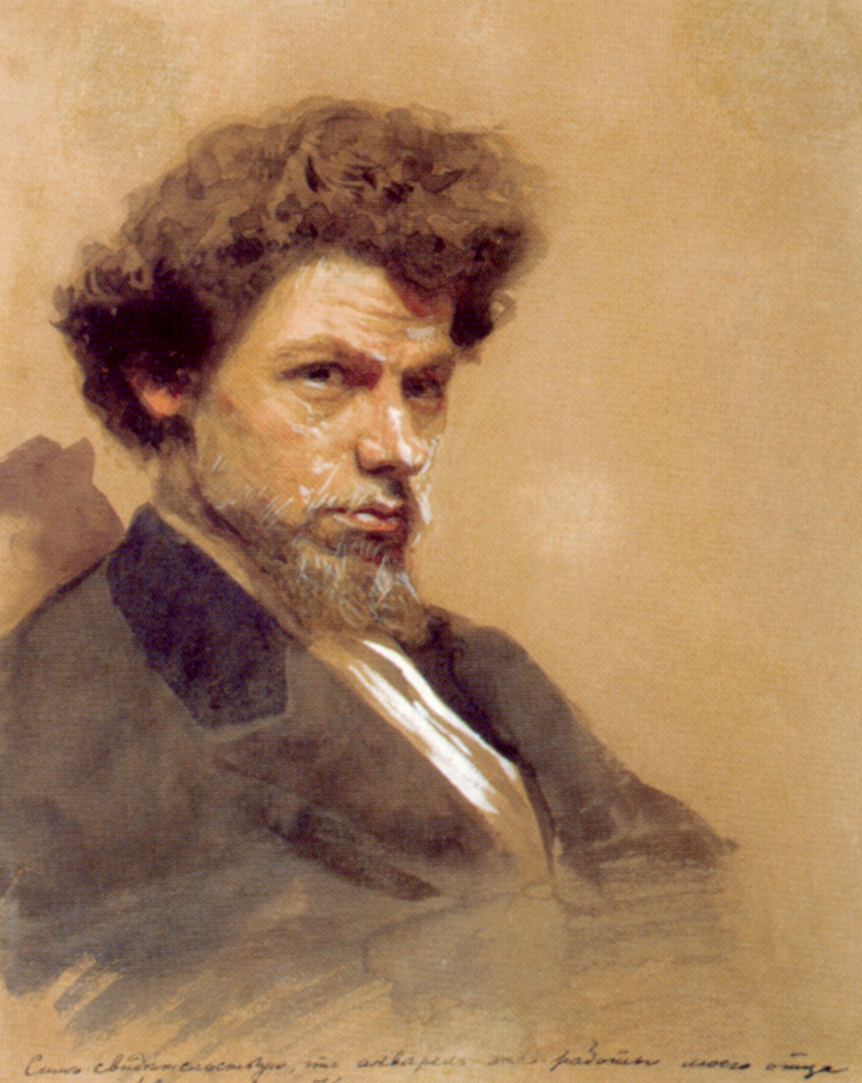
Vassily Maximov

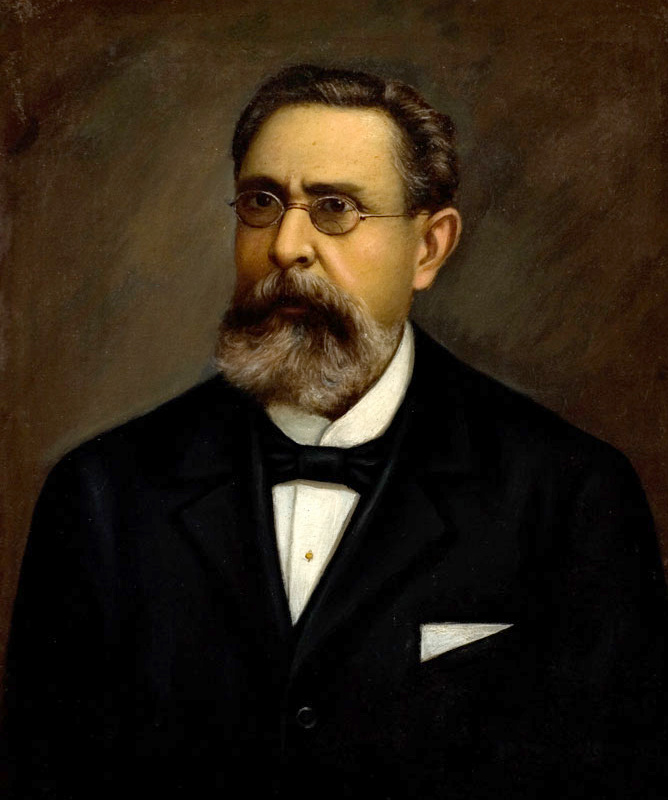
Emilio Estrada Carmona

- December 1 – Vassily Maximov, Russian painter (b. 1844)
- December 2
  - George Davidson, English-born American geodesist, astronomer, geographer, surveyor and engineer (b. 1825)
  - Eugène Alphonse Dyer, Canadian merchant, farmer and political figure (b. 1838)
- December 7 – Robert Maitland Brereton, English railway engineer (b. 1834)
- December 9 – Blessed Bernard Mary of Jesus, Italian Roman Catholic priest, blessed (b. 1831)
- December 10 – Sir Joseph Dalton Hooker, English botanist (b. 1817)
- December 11 – Thomas Ball, American sculptor, musician (b. 1819)
- December 13 – Nikolay Beketov, Russian chemist (b. 1827)
- December 19 – John Bigelow, American lawyer, statesman (b. 1817)
- December 20 – Rose Eytinge, American actress (b. 1835)
- December 21
  - Catharine H. T. Avery, American author and editor (b. 1844)
  - Emilio Estrada Carmona, 18th President of Ecuador (b. 1855)
- December 22
  - Mary Jane Coggeshall, American suffragist (b. 1836)
  - Odilon Lannelongue, French surgeon (b. 1840)
- December 24 – Hyacinth (Jacek) Gulski, American Roman Catholic priest (b. 1847)
- December 25 – Arthur F. Griffith, American calculating prodigy (b. 1880)

== Nobel Prizes ==

- Physics – Wilhelm Wien
- Chemistry – Marie Curie
- Medicine – Allvar Gullstrand
- Literature – Maurice Maeterlinck
- Peace – Tobias Asser
