= Tuck (surname) =

Tuck is a surname, borne by many people and institutions. The name is related to Tucker and Tooke.

Tuck is a masculine name and sometimes nickname given to someone bearing the name of Tucker in many countries. The English surname Tuck is of patronymic origin, being one of those names that was based on the first name of the father. During the Middle Ages when the systems of surnames first developed, it was inevitable that children in the community would be known by their father’s name. In this case the name literally means "The son of Toke", Toke being a medieval personal name. In the Domesday Book of 1086 this first name was more generally rendered as Toka, hence this document mentions a "liber homo Stingandi Toka Francigine" (Toka the Frenchman).

Records of this surname in England date back to the fourteenth century. The poll tax returns of Yorkshire, for example, mention a Thomas Tuke and a Johannes Tokson. In 1526 the Registers of the University of Oxford refer to one of their students as "Nicholas Toke, or Tocke, or Tuke" which indicates the various ways in which this surname could be rendered.

Tuck is also linked further back than the fourteenth century as originating from Nordic, Icelandic and other island countries. This name has many variations through many different cultures that began between the 15th and 16th century. Included are Tuke, Tucka, Toke and Tuske. However, Tuck was primarily a name that began in Viking royalty and what was commonly referred to then as Cosmater as one of the last known Nordic leaders before the disbandment in 1372 A.D. Reaching the medieval periods in England it became more common as travel became less useful to the Nordic. Most of the remaining Nordic travelers found settlement in the English provinces and ended the Cosmatsership.

People with the surname include:

- Adolph Tuck (1854–1926), British fine art publisher
- Al Tuck (born 1966), Canadian songwriter and folksinger
- Amos Tuck (1810–1879), American politician and a founder of the Republican Party
- Amy Tuck (born 1963), American politician
- Annabelle Clinton Imber Tuck (born 1950), American lawyer and former associate justice of the Arkansas Supreme Court
- Anthony Tuck (born 1940), English historian
- Arthur Tuck (1901–1979), American track and field athlete who won the Oregon state high school track and field championship single-handedly
- Barbara Tuck (born 1943), New Zealand artist
- Ben Tuck (born 1997), British racing driver
- Chris Tuck (born 1966), American politician
- Dick Tuck (1924–2018), American former political consultant, campaign strategist, advance man and political prankster
- Donald H. Tuck (1922–2010), Australian bibliographer
- Edward Tuck (1842–1938), American banker and philanthropist
- Ernie Tuck (1939–2009), Australian applied mathematician
- Frank Tuck (born 1931), former Australian rules footballer
- Gary Tuck (born 1954), American baseball former player and coach
- George Tuck (basketball) (1882–1952), American college basketball player
- George Tuck (cricketer) (1843–1920), English lawyer and cricketer
- George Albert Tuck (1884–1981), New Zealand builder, soldier and diarist
- Gerald Tuck (1902–1984), English cricketer and Royal Navy captain
- Hailey Tuck (born 1990), American jazz singer
- Horace Tuck (1876–1951), British painter
- James Tuck (archaeologist), Canadian archaeologist
- James Tuck (cricketer) (1853–1918), English cricketer
- James L. Tuck (1910–1980), British physicist
- James Tuck (Canadian football) (born 1990), Canadian football player
- Jay Tuck (born 1945), American journalist, television producer and author
- Jessica Tuck (born 1963), American actress
- Josiah Tuck (1824–1900), American inventor and submarine pioneer
- Justin Tuck (born 1983), American football player
- Kimberly Tuck (born 1974), Canadian curler
- Lee Tuck (born 1988), Malaysian football player
- Lily Tuck (born 1938), American novelist and short story writer
- Marie Tuck (1866–1947), Australian artist and art educator
- Mary Tuck (1928–1996), British criminologist, psychologist and civil servant
- Matthew Tuck, lead vocalist and rhythm guitarist in the Welsh heavy metal band Bullet for My Valentine
- Michael Tuck (born 1953), Australian rules footballer
- Morgan Tuck (born 1994), American college basketball player
- Raphael Tuck (1910–1982), British Labour politician, academic and lawyer
- Robert Stanford Tuck (1916–1987), British Second World War fighter ace and test pilot
- Rosemary Tuck, Australian-British concert pianist
- Ruth Tuck (1914–2008), Australian painter
- Shane Tuck (1981–2020), Australian rules footballer, son of Michael Tuck, brother of Travis Tuck
- Stuart Tuck (born 1975), English footballer
- Travis Tuck (born 1987), Australian rules footballer, son of Michael Tuck
- Travis Tuck (sculptor) (1943–2002), American metal sculptor
- Somerville Pinkney Tuck (judge) (1848–1923), American jurist and judge
- Somerville Pinkney Tuck (1891–1967), American diplomat, son of Somerville Pinkney Tuck (judge)
- Stephen Tuck, British historian
- Wayne Tuck Jr. (born 1976), Canadian curler
- William George Tuck (1900–1999), English watercolourist
- William Hallam Tuck (1808–1884), American lawyer, judge and banker, father of Somerville Pinkney Tuck (judge)
- William M. Tuck (1896–1983), American politician

== See also ==
- Justice Tuck (disambiguation)
- Senator Tuck (disambiguation)
- Tuck (disambiguation)
