= Edouard Bunge =

Belgian businessman (1851-1927)

- Born: 16 October 1851; Antwerp in the Flemish Region of Belgium
- Died: 19 November 1927 (aged 76)
- Occupations: Businessman, Banker, and Philanthropist
- Spouse: Marie-Sophie Karcher
- Parent(s): Charles Gustave Bunge & Laura Bunge

Édouard Gustav Bunge (16 October 1851 – 19 November 1927) was a Belgian businessman, banker, and philanthropist. He was a close associate of Leopold II and one of the main investors in the Anglo-Belgian India Rubber Company and the Société Anversoise du Commerce au Congo, which exploited rubber in the Congo Free State.

== Early life ==
Bunge was born on 16 October 1851, in Antwerp in the Flemish Region of Belgium. He was a son of Charles Gustave Bunge (1811–1884) and Laura (née Fallenstein) Bunge (1820–1899).

His brother, Ernest Bunge, was the father of Ivan Bunge of Le Havre, and the grandfather of Gerard Michel Bunge. His maternal grandparents were Georg Friedrich Fallenstein (a close friend of Georg Gottfried Gervinus) and Elisabeth (née Benecke) Fallenstein. Through his aunt, Helene Fallenstein (who was married to Max Weber Sr.), he was a first cousin of the prominent German sociologist and historian Max Weber and economist Alfred Weber.

== Career ==
Bunge began working for the family business, today known as Bunge Limited, which had been founded by his grandfather, Johann Peter Gottlieb Bunge, in Amsterdam in 1818 as an import-export business.

In 1859, Édouard relocated the family company to Antwerp. Edouard's brother Ernest brought the company into Argentina in 1884 and, in 1905, the business extended to Brazil and later on to the United States.

In 1909, Édouard Bunge led the creation of the Société Financière des Caoutchoucs, also known as Socfin, which established its head office at Arenbergstraat 21 in Antwerp. That company was taken over ten years later by the Rivaud Group in association with Belgian colonial entrepreneur Adrien Hallet.

== Personal life ==
In 1886 Bunge was married to Marie-Sophie Karcher (1863–1907). Together, they were the parents of:

- Sophia-Laura Bunge (1887–1959), who married Felix Rhodius.
- Dorothée Emilie Bunge (1889–1918), who married Victor Théodore Bracht.
- Erica Bunge (1891–1986), who married Milton McIntyre Brown.
- Eva Maria Bunge (b. 1894), who married Andrew James Widderson, OBE.
- Hilda Bunge (1895–1980), who married American industrialist William Hallam Tuck in Antwerp in 1920. He was a son of Judge Somerville Pinkney Tuck, and brother to Ambassador Somerville Pinkney Tuck and businessman Alexander J. M. Tuck.

Before his death, "he donated a large sum for the establishment of an institute of medicine and surgery for the study of the most modern methods of science." Bunge died on 18 November 1927, in Ekeren, Belgium.

=== Descendants ===
Through his daughter Dorothée, he was a grandfather of Charles Victor Bracht, who was created a baron in 1967 for his services to industry and was later kidnapped and murdered.
