= Charles Bracht =

Belgian alpine skier

Personal information
- Nationality: Belgian
- Born: 7 January 1915; Bloemendaal, Netherlands
- Died: 7 March 1978 (aged 63); Oelegem, Belgium

Sport
- Sport: Alpine skiing

Baron Charles Victor Bracht (7 January 1915 – 7 March 1978) was a Belgian businessman who founded the multinational industrial conglomerate, N.V. Bracht-Aegis and became one of the wealthiest men in Europe. He was formerly an alpine skier who competed in the men's combined event at the 1936 Winter Olympics. With the creation of Bracht-Aegis, he became a wealthy businessman and was kidnapped in 1978. His body was found with a bullet wound to the head.

== Early life ==
Bracht was born on 7 January 1915 into a wealthy Antwerp family. He was a son of Victor Théodore Bracht (1883–1962) and Dorothée Emilie Bunge (1889–1918).

His maternal grandfather was the Belgian businessman Edouard Bunge of Bunge Limited.

== Career ==
Bracht became one of the wealthiest industrialists in Europe, by running a multinational corporation "dealing in commodities, property, banking, insurance and construction. His companies had interests in Zaire, the former Belgian Congo; Indonesia, Malaysia, Australia, Brazil and in West European countries. He also controlled a bank in Antwerp and was involved in an Antwerp insurance concern, Bracht-Regis."

Bracht was created a Baron in 1967 for his services to industry.

== Personal life ==
On 11 November 1941, he married Geneviève Marie Joséphine de Hemptinne (1916–2010) in Sint-Denijs-Westrem. She was the daughter of Charles de Hemptinne and the former Jeanne Marie Joséphine Surmont de Volsberghe. Together, they were the parents of:

- Théodore Jean Charles Bracht (b. 1942), who became chairman of Bracht & Company.
- Marianne Ghislaine Bracht (b. 1945), who married Albert de Limburg-Stirum, a grandson of Thierry, Count of Limburg Stirum.
- Thérèse Marie Ghislaine Bracht, who married Daniel Janssens.
- Réginne Anna Maria Bracht.

=== Death ===
Bracht was kidnapped from his car in an underground garage in Antwerp on 7 March 1978. He was found dead in a garbage dump on 10 April 1978 and his autopsy showed he had "succumbed to injuries apparently suffered while trying to resist the kidnappers." At the time, he was the second Belgian nobleman to be kidnapped that year, the first being Baron Edouard-Jean Empain, who had been abducted in Paris but was released months later.
