= William Tuck =

William Tuck may refer to:

- William George Tuck (1900–1999), English watercolourist
- William Hallam Tuck (1808–1884), Justice of the Maryland Court of Appeals
- William Henry Tuck (1831–1913), Chief Justice of New Brunswick
- William M. Tuck (1896–1983), Governor of Virginia
