= Pinkney Tuck =

Pickney Tuck may refer to:

- Somerville Pinkney Tuck (1891-1967), an American diplomat
- Somerville Pinkney Tuck (judge) (1847-1923), his father, an American judge
