= Alexander J. M. Tuck =

American soldier and businessman

Captain Alexander John Marshall Tuck MC (September 6, 1892 – March 18, 1955) was an American soldier and businessman who was prominent in society.

== Early life ==
Tuck was born in Staten Island, New York on September 6, 1892, the youngest son of Emily Rosalie Snowden Marshall (1858–1940) and Judge Somerville Pinkney Tuck of the Mixed Court of the First Instance in Egypt. His siblings included Carola Marshall Tuck (wife of British MP John Digby Mills), William Hallam Tuck (who married Belgian heiress Hilda Bunge), and diplomat S. Pinkney Tuck (who married Beatrice Beck, only daughter of Solicitor General James M. Beck).

His paternal grandparents were Judge William Hallam Tuck and Margaret Sprigg Bowie (née Chew) Tuck. His maternal grandparents were Sara Rebecca Nicholls (née Snowden) Marshall and Col. Charles Marshall of Baltimore, a Confederate Adjutant and aide-de-camp to General Robert E. Lee. His grandfather was a grand-nephew of Chief Justice John Marshall, and among his uncles was prominent attorney Hudson Snowden Marshall.

Tuck attended Lausanne University before attending Dartmouth College in Hanover, New Hampshire, from where he graduated in 1914. While studying at Oxford University, World War I broke out. Tuck left school and volunteered with the British Army, serving as a Captain with the Seaforth Highlanders from 1914 to 1918. He was wounded twice and was awarded the British Military Cross in 1917 by King George V at Buckingham Palace. He was promoted to Brigade major and general staff officer of Field Marshal Lord Byng's Third Army in France.

== Career ==
In the early 1920s, Tuck represented "American manufacturing interests abroad" and was conducting his business on the Place Vendôme in Paris. He served as a director of the American Machine and Foundry Company for many years. In 1941, he retired as a special partner in stock exchange firm of Cohu & Torrey.

During World War II, he volunteered with the U.S. Air Force as an intelligence officer and served as a Captain from 1942 to 1945 in Italy.

== Personal life ==
Tuck was married four times during his lifetime. His first marriage was to Eugenie Ambrose (née Philbin) Wetmore (1893–1931) at City Hall in the 16th arrondissement of Paris. Eugenie, the former wife of writer Louis H. Wetmore, was a daughter of Judge Eugene A. Philbin and Jessie Marie (née Holladay) Philbin, in 1923. During their marriage, they lived in Paris before moving to New York City where they lived at 1125 Park Avenue. Before her death, they were the parents of:

- Eugénie Marshall Tuck (1924–2017), a debutante who married John Remington Northrop (1920–1944), in 1943. After he was killed in action over France during World War II, she married Lyman Beeman, Jr. of Glen Falls, New York in 1947.
- Alexandra Somerville Tuck (1926–1993), who married Philip Cornelius Walsh (1921–2010) of Lima, Peru in 1945.
- John Marshall Tuck (1928–1983)

His wife died at Saranac Lake on May 26, 1931.

=== Second marriage ===
After her death, he married Margaret (née Screven) White (1903–1964) at the summer home of her aunt, Mrs. H. Snowden Marshall (wife of Tuck's uncle, H. Snowden Marshall), in Ridgefield, Connecticut in 1932. The bride's brother, Franklin B. Screven, was her attendant, and Tuck's best man was Rufus L. Patterson (founder of American Machine and Foundry). Margaret, a daughter of Franklin Buchanan Screven, was the former wife of Fitzhugh White of Savannah, Georgia. A few hours after obtaining a divorce in Reno, Nevada from Tuck, Margaret married diplomat Angier Biddle Duke in November 1940.

=== Third marriage ===
In 1942, while living in Tuxedo Park, New York, Tuck married Princess Donna Christiana (née Torlonia) Lord at the home of the bride's uncle and aunt at 25 Sutton Place, in 1942. At the wedding her sister, Princess Donna Marina Torlonia di Civitella-Cesi (wife of Francis Xavier Shields), was her only attendant and Tuck's best man was Monroe Robinson (son of Corinne Roosevelt Robinson and nephew of President Theodore Roosevelt). Donna Christiana, the former wife of Daniel Lord, was a daughter of Marino Torlonia, 4th Prince of Civitella-Cesi and the American heiress Mary Elsie Moore. Among her siblings were Don Alessandro Torlonia, 5th Prince di Civitella-Cesi (who married Infanta Beatriz of Spain, daughter of King Alfonso XIII of Spain). They divorced in September 1945.

=== Fourth marriage ===
In 1946, Tuck married Edith Eleanor (née Holt) Richmond (1898–1982) at Christ Church Chapel in New York. Edith, the widow of Lawrence E. Richmond, was a daughter of Frank A. Holt and Anna (née Reynolds) Holt of Pasadena, California. The lived at 812 Park Avenue, before moving to Geneva in 1948 where they lived until his death and where Tuck was a president of the American Club and senior warden in the American Church.

Tuck died in Geneva, Switzerland on March 18, 1955. After his death, his widow married Charles Farwell Winston (a grandson of diplomat Frederick Hampden Winston).
