= 1932 New Forest and Christchurch by-election =

UK Parliamentary by-election

The 1932 New Forest and Christchurch by-election was held on 9 February 1932. The by-election was held due to the elevation to the peerage of the incumbent Conservative MP, Wilfrid Ashley. It was won by the Conservative candidate John Mills.

New Forest and Christchurch by-election, 1932
Party	Candidate	Votes	%	±%
Conservative	John Mills	23,327	82.0	−1.3
Ind. Labour Party	C. A. Smith	5,135	18.0	New
Majority		18,192	64.0	−2.6
Turnout		28,462	48.0	−23.9
Conservative hold		Swing		
