= Companies listed on the New York Stock Exchange (B) =

== B ==
Stock name	Symbol	Country of origin
B&G Foods	BGS	US
Babcock & Wilcox	BWC	US
Babson Capital Corporate Investors	MCI	US
Badger Meter	BMI	US
Baker Hughes	BKR	US
Ball Corporation	BLL	US
Bally Technologies	BYI	US
Baltic Trading	BALT	US
Banc of California	BANC	US
Banco Bilbao Vizcaya Argentaria	BBVA	Spain
Banco Bradesco	BBD	Brazil
Banco de Chile	BCH	Chile
Banco Latinoamericano De Comercio Exterior	BLX	Panama
Banco Macro	BMA	Argentina
Banco Santander	SAN	Spain
Banco Santander (Brasil)	BSBR	Brazil
Banco Santander-Chile	BSAC	Chile
Bancolombia	CIB	Colombia
BancorpSouth	BXS	US
Bank of America	BAC	US
Bank of Hawaii	BOH	US
The Bank of New York Mellon	BK	US
Scotiabank	BNS	Canada
Bankrate	RATE	US
BankUnited	BKU	US
Barclays	BCS	United Kingdom
Barnes Group	B	US
Barracuda Networks	CUDA	US
Barrick Gold	ABX	Canada
Basic Energy Services	BAS	US
Baxter International	BAX	US
Baytex Energy	BTE	Canada
BBVA Banco Francés	BFR	Argentina
BankAtlantic	BBX	US
Bell Canada	BCE	Canada
Beazer Homes USA	BZH	US
Becton Dickinson	BDX	US
Belden	BDC	US
Belmond	BEL	Bermuda
Bemis Company	BMS	US
Benchmark Electronics	BHE	US
Berkshire Hathaway	BRK.A & BRK.B	US
Berkshire Hills Bancorp	BHLB	US
Berry Plastics	BERY	US
Best Buy	BBY	US
BGC Partners	BGCA	US
BHP	BBL & BHP	United Kingdom
Big Lots	BIG	US
Biglari Holdings	BH	US
Bill Barrett Corporation	BBG	US
Bio-Rad Laboratories	BIO	US
BioAmber	BIOA	Canada
BioMed Realty Trust	BMR	US
BitAuto Holdings	BITA	China
Black Hills Corporation	BKH	US
BlackRock	BLK	US
The Blackstone Group	BX	US
Blackstone Mortgage Trust	BXMT	US
Blount International	BLT	US
Blue Capital Reinsurance Holdings	BCRH	US
BlueLinx	BXC	US
Blyth	BTH	US
BMO Financial Group	BMO	Canada
Boeing	BA	US
Boise Cascade	BCC	US
Bonanza Creek Energy	BCEI	US
Booz Allen Hamilton	BAH	US
BorgWarner	BWA	US
Boston Beer Co	SAM	US
Boston Properties	BXP	US
Boston Scientific	BSX	US
Box Ships	TEU	Greece
Boyd Gaming	BYD	US
BP	BP	United Kingdom
BP Prudhoe Bay Royalty Trust	BPT	US
BPZ Resources	BPZ	US
Brady Corporation	BRC	US
Brandywine Realty Trust	BDN	US
BrasilAgro – Companhia Brasileira de Propriedades Agrícolas	LND	Brazil
Braskem	BAK	Brazil
BRF S.A.	BRFS	Brazil
Briggs & Stratton	BGG	US
Bright Horizons Family Solutions	BFAM	US
Brinker International	EAT	US
Brink's	BCO	US
Bristol-Myers Squibb	BMY	US
Bristow Helicopters	BRS	US
Brixmor Property Group	BRX	US
Broadridge Financial Solutions	BR	US
Brookdale Senior Living	BKD	US
Brookfield Asset Management	BAM	Canada
Brookfield Canada Office Properties	BOXC	Canada
Brookfield Infrastructure Partners	BIP	Canada
Brookfield Property Partners	BPY	Canada
Brookfield Renewable	BEP	Canada
Brookfield Residential	BRP	Canada
Brown & Brown	BRO	US
Brown-Forman	BF.A & BF.B	US
Brown Shoe	BWS	US
BRT Realty Trust	BRT	US
Brunswick Corporation	BC	US
BT Group	BT	United Kingdom
Buckeye Partners	BPL	US
The Buckle	BKE	US
Build-A-Bear Workshop	BBW	US
Bunge	BG	US
Burlington Coat Factory	BURL	US
