= Tuck =

Tuck may refer to:

== People ==
- Tuck (surname), including a list of people
- Tuck (nickname), a list of people
- Tuck (footballer), Portuguese football player and coach João Carlos Novo de Araújo Gonçalves (born 1969)
- Hillary Tuck (born 1978), American actress born Hillary Sue Hedges
- Tuck Langland, American sculptor
- Tuck Woolum (fl. 1979–1998), American former college football player and head coach
- Trinity the Tuck, American drag performer Ryan A. Taylor (born 1984)

== Fictional characters ==
- Friar Tuck, one of Robin Hood's Merry Men
- Tuck, a pill bug in the 1998 animated film A Bug's Life
- Tuck, the family name of characters in the novel Tuck Everlasting and two film adaptations
- Turtle Tuck, in the animated series Wonder Pets
- Tuck, in the animated series My Life as a Teenage Robot

== Sports ==
- Back or front tuck, a type of acrobatic flip
- One of several dive positions

== Other uses ==
- Tuck (sewing), a fold or pleat in fabric that is sewn in place
- Tuck (sword), also known as an estoc in French
- Tuck School of Business, the graduate business school of Dartmouth College, Hanover, New Hampshire, United States
- Tuck Baronets, a title in the Baronetage of Great Britain
- Tuck, Kentucky, an unincorporated community
- Mount Tuck, Ellsworth Mountains, Antarctica
- Tuck, third novel in the King Raven Trilogy, by Stephen R. Lawhead
- Tuck., botanical author abbreviation for Edward Tuckerman (1817–1886), American botanist and professor
- Tucks Medicated Pads, brand of witch hazel-infused pads for topical relief of hemorrhoidal or perineal irritation

== See also ==
- Mach tuck, a dangerous change in pitching tendency of some aircraft during transonic flight
- Tuck shop, a small retailer selling food
- Krewe of Tucks, New Orleans Mardi Gras krewe
- Tucking
- Tuk (disambiguation)
