= Jay Nelson Tuck =

American journalist

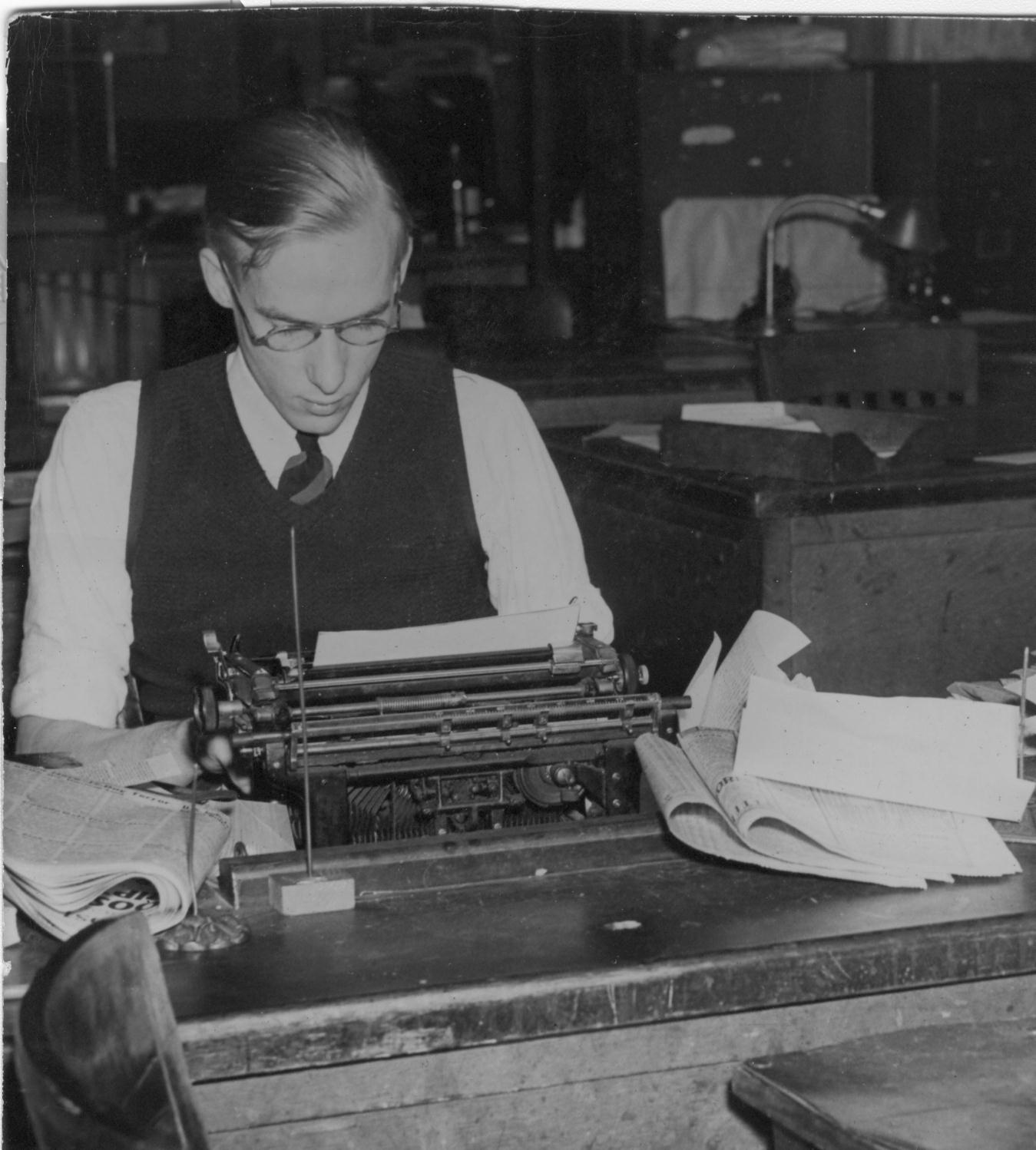
Jay Nelson Tuck, Reporter at the New York Post

Jay Nelson Tuck (1916–1985) was a journalist, television critic and president of The Newspaper Guild of New York City. He held reporting and editing posts at the New York World-Telegram and Sun, The New York Post and at Medical World News, a magazine of McGraw Hill.

== Youth ==
Born in Chapel Hill, North Carolina on June 24, 1916, under the name Osborn La Roux Goforth Jr., he had difficult childhood. His mother Natalie was a dancer with the Ziegfeld Follies in the Roaring Twenties, his father, Osborn Goforth, a salesman who abandoned the family. When his mother resumed her maiden name, Natalie Tuck, she renamed her son Jay Nelson Tuck. In 1928, Natalie went bankrupt and her young son was sent to the orphanage “Sheltering Arms”.

== Education ==
Despite childhood poverty, the young Tuck was admitted to the prestigious Lincoln School, associated with Columbia University, and later to Horace Mann School, an elite educational institution for the wealthy. His college studies at Columbia University in New York were interrupted by the Great Depression. Like millions of others, Tuck hitched rides on freight trains, shared campfires with the homeless and survived on Salvation Army soup. After two years, he was able to return and graduate from Columbia in 1938. He married Margaret Cox in New York and later had two sons, Travis Tuck and Jay Tuck.

== Conscientious Objector in WW II ==
Throughout his life, Jay Nelson Tuck was a strong-willed man guided by his moral convictions. During World War II, he took a pacifist position. Refusing military service he became a conscientious objector and organized rallies for the pacifist movement. He was an outspoken leader of the War Resisters League and edited a monthly newspaper, The Conscientious Objector.

== New York Post ==
Jay Nelson Tuck held reporting and editing posts at the World-Telegram and Sun and The New York Post. He was a strong believer in unions. Between 1950 and 1952, he co-founded the Newspaper Guild of New York, was elected its president and presided over a 10-week strike at the World Telegram and Sun. As investigative reporter for the New York Post, then a politically liberal newspaper, he covered the shooting of two defendants in the racially charged Groveland rape case (dubbed the "Little Scottsboro case" because of its resemblance to the notorious 1931 case in Alabama) by Sheriff Willis McCall in Florida. His reporting won Tuck the George Polk Award for distinguished journalism in 1952.

== Television critic ==
As a television critic in the mid-1950s and 1960s, Tuck authored the column “On the Air” daily for the New York Post. His sharp-tongued opinions became a major force in the East Coast media of the time. He was a prominent critic of the McCarthy Era. Known for his humor, he also contributed cartoon ideas and satires to the work of his journalist colleagues, for example at the humoristic Yuk Yuk Department of the Post.

== Author ==
Together with Norma Vergara, Jay Nelson Tuck authored the non-fiction historical book Heroes of Puerto Rico, featuring the biographies of eleven Puerto Ricans who, from the eighteenth century to the present day, contributed to the emancipation and development of their island. Fleet Press Corp, March 1970 - 141 pages hardcover ISBN 0830300708 ISBN 978-0830300709

In later years, Tuck worked as Managing Editor for Confidential Magazine and as editor of the similar Whisper magazine. He was also a writer for Medical World News, a magazine published by McGraw Hill and a free-lancer.

Jay Nelson Tuck died of lung cancer at his home in Lafayette Township, New Jersey at the age of 69. He was survived by his wife, Lynne Weiner Tuck, a medical writer; his former wife, Margaret Tuck; and two sons from his first marriage, Travis of Martha's Vineyard and Jay Jr. of Hamburg, Germany.
