= Justice Tuck =

Justice Tuck may refer to:

- Annabelle Clinton Imber Tuck (born 1950), American former associate justice of the Arkansas Supreme Court
- William Hallam Tuck (1808–1884), American justice of the Maryland Court of Appeals
- William Henry Tuck (1831–1913), Canadian chief justice of New Brunswick

== See also ==
- Somerville Pinkney Tuck (judge) (1848–1923), American judge who served on the International Court of Appeals in Egypt
