= New Forest and Christchurch =

Former parliamentary constituency in the United Kingdom

- Former county constituency for the House of Commons

1918–1950
- Seats: one
- Created from: New Forest and Bournemouth
- Replaced by: New Forest and Bournemouth East and Christchurch

New Forest and Christchurch was a county constituency in Hampshire which elected one Member of Parliament (MP) to the House of Commons of the Parliament of the United Kingdom. It was created for the 1918 general election, partially replacing the previous New Forest constituency, and was abolished for the 1950 general election, when it was partially replaced by a recreated New Forest constituency.

== Boundaries ==
The Boroughs of Christchurch, Lymington, and Romsey, and the Rural Districts of Christchurch, Fordingbridge, Lymington, New Forest, Ringwood, and Romsey.

== Members of Parliament ==
Election	Member	Party	Notes
1918	Walter Frank Perkins	Conservative	
1922	Wilfrid Ashley	Conservative	Resigned January 1932 on being raised to the peerage
1932 by-election	John Mills	Conservative	
1945	Oliver Crosthwaite-Eyre	Conservative	Subsequently, MP for New Forest
1950	constituency abolished: see New Forest & Bournemouth East and Christchurch		

== Election results ==
=== Elections in the 1910s ===
General election 1918: New Forest and Christchurch
Party		Candidate	Votes	%	±%
C	Unionist	Walter Frank Perkins	Unopposed		
	Unionist hold				
C indicates candidate endorsed by the coalition government.

=== Elections in the 1920s ===
General election 1922: New Forest and Christchurch
Party	Candidate	Votes	%	±%
Unionist	Wilfrid Ashley	Unopposed		
Unionist hold				

General election 1923: New Forest and Christchurch
Party	Candidate	Votes	%	±%
Unionist	Wilfrid Ashley	13,900	53.9	N/A
Liberal	Alexander Boulton	11,889	46.1	New
Majority		2,011	7.8	N/A
Turnout		25,789	68.8	N/A
Registered electors		37,475		
Unionist hold		Swing	N/A	

General election 1924: New Forest and Christchurch
Party	Candidate	Votes	%	±%
Unionist	Wilfrid Ashley	17,945	64.6	+10.7
Liberal	Alexander Boulton	6,681	24.1	−22.0
Labour	C Lincoln Brighton	3,137	11.3	New
Majority		11,264	40.5	+32.7
Turnout		27,763	71.4	+2.6
Registered electors		38,905		
Unionist hold		Swing	+16.4	

General election 1929: New Forest and Christchurch
Party	Candidate	Votes	%	±%
Unionist	Wilfrid Ashley	22,122	55.5	−9.1
Liberal	Marcus Cheke	11,520	28.9	+4.8
Labour	G W Austin	6,206	15.6	+4.3
Majority		10,602	26.6	−13.9
Turnout		39,848	72.6	+1.2
Registered electors		53,884		
Unionist hold		Swing	−7.0	

=== Elections in the 1930s ===
General election 1931: New Forest and Christchurch
Party	Candidate	Votes	%	±%
Conservative	Wilfrid Ashley	35,544	83.3	+27.8
Labour	Frank Stainer	7,130	16.7	+1.1
Majority		28,414	66.6	+40.0
Turnout		47,067	71.9	−0.7
Conservative hold		Swing		

1932 New Forest and Christchurch by-election
Party	Candidate	Votes	%	±%
Conservative	John Mills	23,327	82.0	−1.3
Ind. Labour Party	C. A. Smith	5,135	18.0	New
Majority		18,192	64.0	−2.6
Turnout		28,462	48.0	−23.9
Conservative hold		Swing		

General election 1935: New Forest and Christchurch
Party	Candidate	Votes	%	±%
Conservative	John Mills	32,209	74.8	−8.5
Labour	CM Wadham	10,876	25.2	+8.5
Majority		21,333	49.6	−17.0
Turnout		43,085	64.5	−7.4
Conservative hold		Swing		

General Election 1939–40: Another General Election was required to take place before the end of 1940. The political parties had been making preparations for an election to take place and by the Autumn of 1939, the following candidates had been selected;

- Conservative: John Mills
- Liberal: H J Dey
- Labour: RE Gray

=== Elections in the 1940s ===
General election 1945: New Forest and Christchurch
Party	Candidate	Votes	%	±%
Conservative	Oliver Crosthwaite-Eyre	31,888	50.9	−23.9
Labour	Horace King	22,478	35.9	+10.7
Independent Liberal	John W Howlett	8,299	13.2	New
Majority		9,410	15.0	−34.6
Turnout		62,665	71.3	+6.8
Conservative hold		Swing		
