= C. A. Smith =

English politician (1895 – 1984)

Charles Andrew Smith MM (1895 – 1984) known as C. A. Smith, was an English politician who held prominent positions in several minor parties.

Born in Bishop Auckland, Smith studied at the University of Durham and the University of London, then trained as a school teacher, and later worked as a tutor for the Workers' Educational Association. During World War I, he served in The Royal Army Medical Corps as a Stretcher Bearer and received the Military Medal. During World War II Smith taught history at Huntingdon Grammar School.

Smith was a Labour Party and Independent Labour Party (ILP) parliamentary candidate for Dulwich in 1924 and 1929 and in New Forest and Christchurch in 1932.

In 1933, he attended a conference of left socialists, organised by the ILP. Following its conclusion, Smith and John Paton travelled to meet Trotsky. After this meeting, he argued broadly in favour of the Fourth International until at least 1935.

In 1939, he succeeded James Maxton as Chairman of the ILP. World War II began the same year, and the ILP opposed it, but in 1941 Smith surprised the party by announcing that he supported the prosecution of the war. As such, he resigned both from the ILP and his role as chair. Shortly afterwards, he joined the Common Wealth Party as its Research Officer, and in 1944 he succeeded Kim Mackay as the party chairman. With the onset of the Cold War, Smith became increasingly anti-communist, and increasingly a proponent of Zionism. Unable to gain support in Common Wealth for his ideas, he left in 1948.

Smith began working with a range of anti-communists, including Jack Tanner of the Amalgamated Engineering Union, the Duchess of Atholl (founder of the British League for European Freedom) and Conservative Party MP Malcolm Douglas-Hamilton, founding Common Cause in 1951, which aimed to combat communism in the trade unions. He soon became its general secretary, but the group dissolved itself into Industrial Research and Information Services in 1956.

Party political offices
Preceded by James Maxton	Chairman of the Independent Labour Party; 1939–1941	Succeeded by John McGovern
Preceded by Kim Mackay	Chairman of the Common Wealth Party; 1945–1947	Succeeded by Donald M. Fraser
