= Harris Katleman =

American television producer (1928–2026)

- Born: August 19, 1928; Omaha, Nebraska, U.S.
- Died: July 8, 2026 (aged 97); Los Angeles, California, U.S.
- Occupation: Television producer
- Children: 3; including Michael

Harris Katleman (August 19, 1928 – July 8, 2026) was an American television producer. He produced for television programs including The Don Rickles Show, Branded, From Here to Eternity, Salvage 1, and The American Girls. Aside from producing, he guest-starred as Colonel Charles Marshall in an episode of the American western television series The Rebel.

Katleman died in Los Angeles, California on July 8, 2026, at the age of 97.
