= Belgika =

Former trading company in the Congo Free State and Belgian Congo

La Belgika
- Type: Trading
- Founded: 1894
- Defunct: 1964
- Area served: Congo Free State / Belgian Congo / Democratic Republic of the Congo

Belgika was a trading company that was active in the Congo Free State and the Belgian Congo, founded in 1894 by Adrien Hallet. It produced, processed and exported commodities such as rubber, palm oil and coffee, and imported basic goods needed by the local people, which it sold in a network of stores. In 1956 it absorbed the Coloniale de Belgique investment company, also cofounded by Hallet in 1899 and known until 1935 as Banque Coloniale de Belgique.

== Foundation ==
The limited partnership Vandenvinne et cie was founded on 15 November 1894.It had an initial capital of 150,000 francs. In 1896 it was renamed Comptoir d'exportation et d'importation Belgika, and on 20 June 1899 it took the name Belgika, comptoir colonial. The administrative headquarters were in Brussels and the operational headquarters in Stanleyville (Kisangani).

== Activities ==
The company was mainly active in the eastern Congo. It engaged in farming and livestock, and had coffee, rubber and oil palm plantations, including 1,500 hectares (3,700 acres) of rubber trees on Ile Bertha and 200 hectares (490 acres) of rubber trees in Kibombo. It processed and exported coffee, rubber, palm oil, rice and cotton. The company ran stores where it sold basic goods to the local people.

The subsidiary Belgikaor was set up in 1931 with a capital of 15 million francs, raised to 30 million francs in 1947. Its purpose was to prospect for minerals in the Lowa and Pangi regions. In 1947 it produced over 7,000 kilograms (15,000 lb) of refined gold as well as other minerals. In 1932 Belgika and the Minière des Grands Lacs Africains (MGL) founded the Société Minière du Lualaba (Miluba), whose deposits in the mining area of the Compagnie du chemin de fer du Congo supérieur aux Grands Lacs africains (CFL) were exploited by Cobelmin.

In the late 1930s the commissioner of Orientale Province, Rodolphe Dufour, was the target of concerted and virulent attacks from La Belgika and the Kilo-Moto Gold Mines delivered by their influential representatives André Gilson, also president of the Association of Belgian Colonial Interests, and by General Georges Moulaert. They claimed that he failed to support colonial interests and caused great damage as a result.

In 1952 Belgika had capital of 103 million francs. It employed 23 Europeans and 3,400 Africans. A 1952 tourist guide showed that La Belgika had a hotel and provided car rentals with drivers. At the end of the 1950s La Belgika employed 83 European agents and 15,000 Africans, mostly in the Orientale Province, Maniema District and Kivu District. It had over 2,000 hectares (4,900 acres) of coffee, palm oil and rubber plantations with various factories for processing coffee, palm oil, rubber, rice and cotton. It had 250 local stores and three wholesale and retail stores. It represented various European companies selling vehicles, machinery, insurance and travel services.

== Banque Coloniale de Belgique ==
The Banque Coloniale de Belgique was established on 27 April 1899 at the initiative of Adrien Hallet, who was its largest shareholder at creation. It operated mostly as an investment company, initially taking stakes in the Charbonnages Gossoudarieff, a Belgian company established to develop coal projects in Russia, the Forges et Aciéries Néerlandaises de Terneuzen, an ironworks venture in Terneuzen, Netherlands, and various colonial ventures including in the French Congo.

In November 1935, to comply with new Belgian banking regulations, it reorganized itself as a holding company under the shortened name Coloniale de Belgique. Its shares were listed on the Brussels Stock Exchange until the 1956 transaction by which Belgica took over all its assets and liability. The rump company was liquidated three years later on 10 November 1959.

By 1921 it had its offices at Rue Royale 81 in central Brussels.
