= Adrien Hallet =

Belgian economist and businessman (1867–1925)

Adrien Hallet (18 May 1867 – 1 April 1925) was a Belgian agricultural engineer and businessman. He founded a group of colonial ventures that became the SOCFIN Group.

== Early life and education ==
Born in Philippeville, Hallet trained as an agricultural engineer at the Agronomic University of Gembloux.

== Career ==
In August 1889, he arrived in Boma in the Congo Free State to work in a trading office, the Compagnie des Produits on Île de Mateba. Hallet studied natural rubber there, and developed new cultivation methods to maximize yield.

In 1894, Hallet left the Compagnie des Produits and established his first own venture, the Belgika joint-stock company. In 1899, he cofounded the Banque Coloniale de Belgique, based in Brussels, of which he was initially the largest shareholder. That same year, Belgika and the Banque Coloniale together brought 26 percent of the initial capital of the Mpoko Company, a new French colonial venture focused on the Mpoko River region of the part of French Congo that would soon be separated as Ubangi-Shari. Around 1900, Hallet also ventured into plantations in French Dahomey, albeit unsuccessfully.

In 1905, Hallet relocated to Southeast Asia, where, in 1906, he founded the Compagnie de Selangor in Selangor, Malaya. In 1909, he was involved in the creation by Edouard Bunge of the Société Financière des Caoutchoucs, known as Socfin, which also invested in plantations in Indonesia and Malaya. In 1910, he founded the Plantations Hallet company in Brussels, with head office at 59 rue de Namur, and partnered with the Rivaud Group to expand into French Indochina.

In 1919, Hallet was associated with Rivaud's takeover of Socfin, and simultaneously founded the Banque des Colonies, another private bank serving his ventures from Brussels. By the end of his life, he had founded more than 20 companies and controlled 73,000 hectares of rubber plantations, 29,000 hectares of oil palm plantations, and 21,000 hectares of coffee plantations in Africa and Southeast Asia.

== Death ==
Hallet died on 1 April 1925 in Brussels.

== See also ==
- Belgian colonial empire
