= Travis Tuck (sculptor) =

American sculptor (1943–2002)

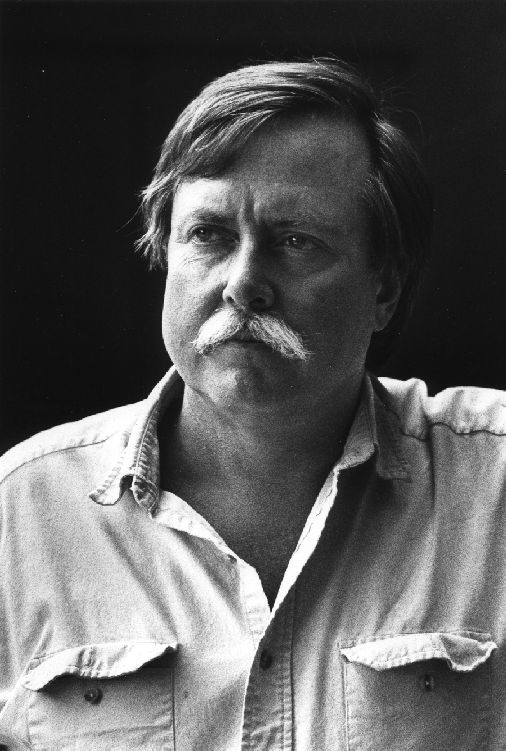
Travis Tuck, Metal Sculptor

Travis Tuck (February 20, 1943 – November 18, 2002) was a Martha's Vineyard based metal sculptor known for his hand-crafted weather vanes of repoussé copper and bronze. His works turn in the wind above Steven Spielberg's East Hampton estate and 110 feet over Penn State's Beaver Stadium.

== Youth ==
Born February 20, 1943, in Brooklyn, New York, Tuck grew up with his family in the New Jersey suburb of Pompton Lakes. His paternal grandmother, Natalie Tuck, was one of the original Ziegfeld dancers, his maternal grandmother, Hettie May Tucket, survived the Galveston Flood as a child floating on a door. His mother, Margaret Cox, married Jay Nelson Tuck, a celebrated journalist who was the New York Post's first radio and television critic.

== Military service ==
Tuck graduated from Pompton Lakes High School in 1960. He enlisted in the United States Air Force and was trained at Keesler Air Force Base in Biloxi, Mississippi. Assigned to Otis Air Force Base on Cape Cod from 1961 to 1964, he repaired airborne computers on Lockheed EC-121 Warning Star radar planes.

== Early career in New York ==
Upon leaving the service, Tuck drifted from job to job for several years, before finding his love for metal sculpting. In Greenwich Village, he took a part-time job with Hans Van deBovenkamp, an internationally recognized metal sculptor. They worked in an old horse stable on West 10th street. Travis Tuck spent four years developing his skills alongside Van De Bovenkamp, before founding his own small business on 28th Street.

== Weather vanes on Martha's Vineyard ==
Tuck moved to the Martha's Vineyard in 1970 with Merrily Glasser-Boyd, his first wife. In the beginning, odd jobs as carpenter, tour guide and bartender were needed to supplement his artistic income. His break came in 1974 when an upstart director named Steven Spielberg arrived to film a movie about a shark. The artist saw an opportunity. Tuck's first weathervane, a fierce shark, served as a prop for the blockbuster movie “Jaws”.

Since that time, hundreds of evocative figures – some drawn from nature, many from contemporary life – were commissioned by private owners and businesses. Mr. Tuck's weather vanes, which could draw between $10,000 and $100,000, perch on houses and buildings in 40 states and 13 countries. On Martha's Vineyard, the whale ship Perry stands above the Town Hall in Edgartown, a golden quill drifts over the offices of the Vineyard Gazette. There is a Travis Tuck cow spinning over the Agricultural Society and as osprey flying above the local hospital. Many residents have commissioned ships and birds, golden retrievers and fish to mark their houses.

Tuck handcrafted one-of-a-kind weather vanes, spending many hours in discussions with clients or researching the right details. Then he maps the design, cutting it from copper, shaping it with heat and cold. He finishes with repoussé, hammering the metal into shape with wooden forms.

“My technique is entirely freehand”, he once explained. “There is never a mold. Each is an entirely new sculpture, each hammer blow part of the creative process."

Among his most famous works are a four-foot velociraptor from “Jurassic Park” on the stable at Steven Spielberg's East Hampton estate, a seal of the United States for NJ Senator Frank Lautenberg and a massive 10 ft. 2,000 pound Nittany Lion weathervane above Penn State's Beaver Stadium. Tuck also presented a sculpture to visiting President Bill Clinton during his stay on the Vineyard in 1994.

Portraits appeared in The New York Times, The Boston Globe and Architectural Digest. Television programs featured him on national television. Once described by Condé Nast Traveler as "America's premier weathervane maker", he was known internationally. His works were exhibited in Hamburg, Germany.

== Public service ==
Tuck was known for his kindly appearance. While dressed for making weather vanes, he resembled a European clockmaker with his black and white moustache and worn leather apron. He was an avid sailor who crewed on wooden sailboats in the Caribbean. He visited Europe 40 times, including one trip by rail from Switzerland to Hong Kong in 1984. A year later, he bought a BMW touring motorcycle in Germany so he could ride behind the Iron Curtain through East Germany, France, and the former Czechoslovakia.

Privately, Mr. Tuck was deeply rooted in the fabric of his local community. He was a retired firefighter and emergency medical technician and he served on the West Tisbury finance committee, the Arts Council and as active member of the Barnacle Club and the American Legion. He was also a founding member of “Veterans & Reservists to End the War in Vietnam”.

"I have been very lucky. I have had great friends, great lovers and great relationships," he once said.

== Tuck & Holand ==
Tuck had many assistants over the years, but it was his four-year working relationship with Anthony Holand that started him thinking about a successor. In 2002, they joined in partnership to form Tuck & Holand. Anthony's experience and natural ability made him a logical choice as partner.

Mr. Tuck died two years after his diagnosis with lung cancer, at his home-studio in Vineyard Haven, MA. He was survived by his son, Nelson Tuck, his brother, Jay Tuck, and his fiancée, Kathryn Roessel. He leaves three former wives: Merrily Glasser-Boyd, Eva Kaestlin (Nelson's mother) and Eleanor Tuck.
