= Donald M. Fraser (British politician) =

British politician

Donald M. Fraser (1904 – unknown) was a Scottish socialist activist.

Fraser was educated at the University of Edinburgh, before becoming a magistrate in North Borneo. He became aware of the oppressive role of British rule, and resigned to become a schoolteacher in Scotland.

Fraser joined the Independent Labour Party, serving as vice-chair of its Scottish area, but resigned to join the Socialist League split, and was secretary of the London Socialist League. He also became active in the Fabian Society, serving on its executive. He was secretary of the 1936 Fabian Group, and organised a conference on socialism and non-manual workers.

At the 1935 United Kingdom general election, Fraser stood for the Labour Party in Farnham, but he was not elected. He was then adopted as Prospective Parliamentary Candidate for North Norfolk, but no election was held until 1945. In 1943, Fraser instead joined the Common Wealth Party, becoming secretary of its eastern region, and then of its North Midlands region. In 1947, he was elected as the party's chair.

Party political offices
Preceded by C. A. Smith	Chair of the Common Wealth Party; 1947–?	Succeeded by ?
