= Hudson Snowden Marshall =

US attorney (1870-1931)

H. Snowden Marshall
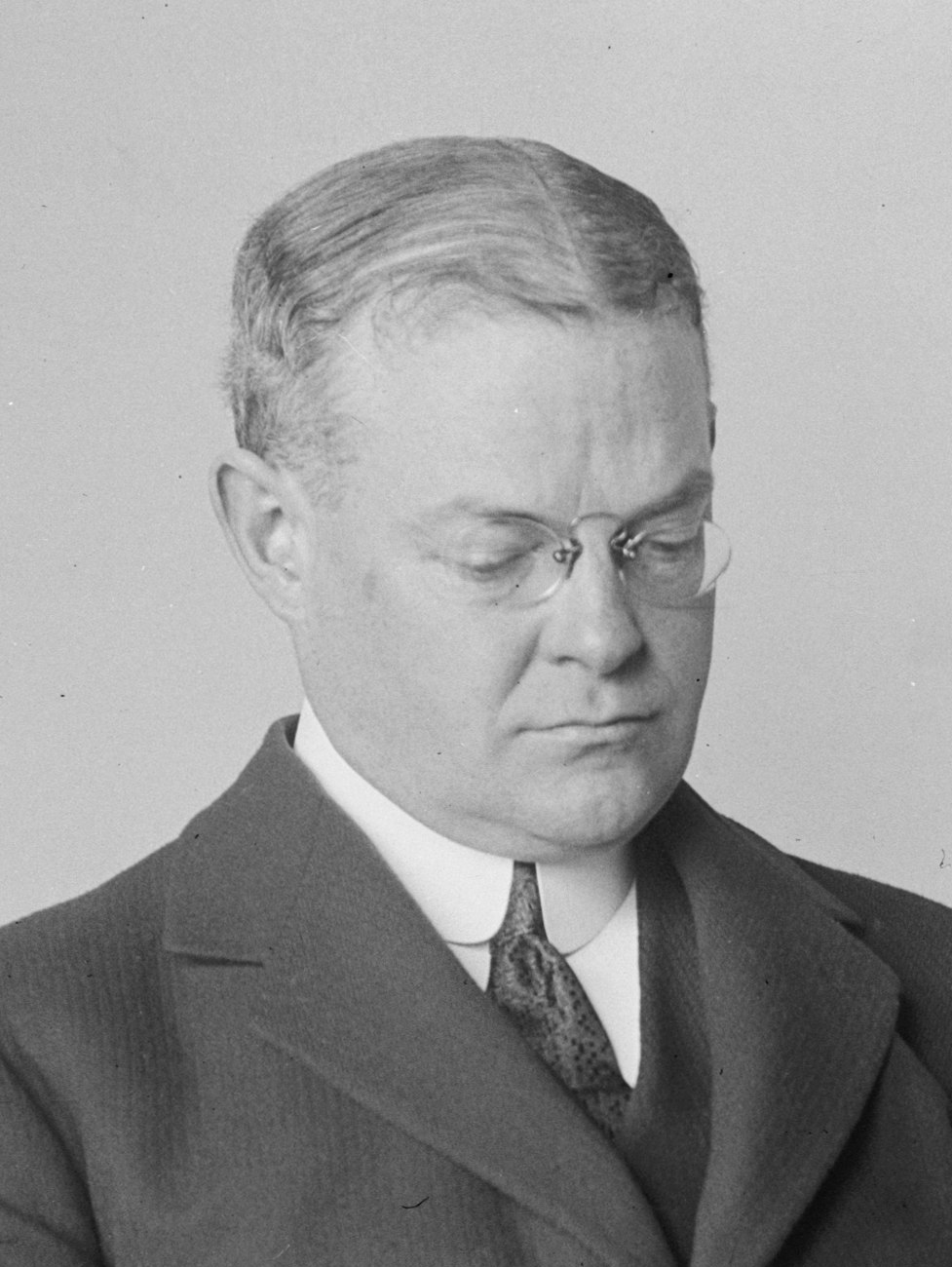
- 'Marshall circa 1910 to 1915

U.S. Attorney for the Southern District of New York
- In office May 7, 1913 – May 1917
- Appointed by: Woodrow Wilson
- Preceded by: Henry A. Wise (attorney)
- Succeeded by: Francis Gordon Caffey

Personal details
- Born: January 15, 1870 Baltimore, Maryland
- Died: May 15, 1931 (aged 61) Manhattan, New York City
- Spouse: Isabella Couper Stiles
- Relations: Somerville Pinkney Tuck (nephew); Alexander J. M. Tuck (nephew)
- Parent: Charles Marshall

Hudson Snowden Marshall (January 15, 1870 – May 29, 1931) was the United States Attorney for the Southern District of New York from 1915 to 1917.

== Early life ==
Hudson Snowden Marshall was born on January 15, 1870, in Baltimore, Maryland. He was a son of Sarah Rebecca Nicholls (née Snowden) Marshall (1840–1929) and Colonel Charles Marshall (1830-1902), a Confederate Adjutant and aide-de-camp to General Robert E. Lee. He had one sister, Emily Rosalie Snowden Marshall (wife of Judge Somerville Pinkney Tuck), and three brothers, James Markham Marshall, Robert Edward Lee Marshall, and Charles Alexander Marshall.

His paternal grandparents were Maria Rose (née Taylor) Marshall and Alexander John Marshall, nephew of Chief Justice John Marshall. His maternal grandparents were Thomas Snowden and Ann Rebecca (née Nicholls) Snowden. Through his sister, he was uncle to diplomat Somerville Pinkney Tuck, and businessman Alexander John Marshall Tuck.

After primary school in Baltimore, he attended Maupin's School in Ellicott City, Maryland, before attending the University of Virginia, from where he graduated in 1890.

== Career ==
In 1894, he was admitted to the bar and began practicing in Maryland before being chosen at Assistant United States Attorney by William L. Marbury. In May 1896 he became a member of Seward, Guthrie, Morawetz & Steele in New York City. Two years later, he joined the firm of Weeks, Battle & Marhsall as partner of prominent Tammany Hall leader George Gordon Battle and Bartow S. Weeks, who later became a Justice of the New York Court of Appeals. In 1905, Weeks left the firm and James Aloysius O'Gorman, later a U.S. Senator, joined and it was renamed O'Gorman, Battle & Marshall.

In the Spring of 1913, President Woodrow Wilson appointed Marshall the United States Attorney for the Southern District of New York. He served until the end of his term in May 1917. While in office, he said "most of the bankruptcies in New York are dishonest, with perjury rampant. State legislation is needed to supplement the Federal statutes and to give the authorities further power to deal criminally with the prevalent fraud in business failures." Marshall retired from office to resume the practice of law with Parker, Marshall, Miller Auchincloss & Randall with Alton B. Parker, former Chief Judge of the New York Court of Appeals and Democratic nominee for President of the United States in 1904. After Parker's death in 1926, the firm became Marshall & Auchincloss, the other members being Gordon Auchincloss (son-in-law of Edward M. House), and J. Donald Duncan.

== Personal life ==
In 1900 Marshall was married to Isabella Couper Stiles (1872–1956), a daughter of Margaret Wylly (née Couper) Stiles and Robert Mackay Stiles (son of U.S. Representative William Henry Stiles). He was a member of the New York Southern Society, the Virginians, the Maryland Society of New York, the Century Association, the Metropolitan Club, the Calument Club, the Saint Nicholas Society, the New York Athletic Club and the Oakland Golf Club.

He died on May 29, 1931, at his home, 128 East 66th Street, in Manhattan, New York City. After a funeral held at the Church of the Incarnation on East 35th Street, he was buried at Kensico Cemetery in Valhalla, New York. He left a net estate worth $137,812, which went to his widow, Isabel, and on her death, to three nieces and two nephews.
