= SOCFIN Group =

Luxembourgish holding company

SOCFIN Group, also known as the Société Financière des Caoutchoucs, is a holding company listed on the Luxembourg Stock Exchange, with direct and indirect interest in oil palm and rubber plantation operations and marketing of oil palm seeds in Asia and Africa. It is majority-owned by the Bollore Group of France and the Hubert Fabri family of Luxembourg. The company operates in various countries through managing subsidiaries involved in joint ventures with governments and entrepreneurs. In 2018, it earned revenues from approximately 130,000 ha of palm oil plantations and 64,000 ha of rubber plantations.

In Africa, it manages assets in Nigeria, Ghana, Sierra Leone, Cameroon, and eight other countries, while in Asia, it principally operates in Indonesia and Cambodia.

== History ==
SOCFIN's history dates back to the trade activities of Belgian agronomist Adrien Hallet in colonial Congo, Sumatra, and Malaya. In the beginning of the twentieth century, the introduction of rubber from the Amazon into Southeast Asia generated excitement among planters and investors, including Hallet, who went on to invest in ventures in the booming rubber trade. Hallet arrived to Asia from the Belgian Congo and had acquired knowledge about the oil palm tree in Africa, when interest was still high in rubber, and he decided that oil palm would be suitable for cultivation in the region and that the existing labour supply and infrastructure would help distribution. He established an estate in East Aceh, Sumatra, in 1911, and between 1909 and 1917, he expanded the range of his business by teaming up with two French planters, Franck Posth and Henri Fauconnier, in the development estates in Kuala Selangor, Malaysia.

Deeper investments in research and development, in addition to cooperation with other enterprises, such as the Danish-owned United Plantations, led to improvements in seed selection and plantation supply techniques. Investments from the French banker Rene de Rivaud, the introduction of new methods of supply, and shipping infrastructure at Port Klang helped expand the firm's operations in the 1920s and early 1930s.

At this time, the company launched an expansion strategy through clearing and planting of oil palm and rubber seeds in Southeast Asia. Plantations were established in Labis, Johore, Pahang, and other areas of the region. By the middle of the 1930s, the firm operated sixteen plantations in Asia, which were later restructured into nine estates, managed by eight managers.

Changes within the group's structure took place in 1996, when Bolloré acquired the interests of the Rivaud family, and in 2004, the firm sold its plantation interests in Singapore and Malaysia.

== African investments ==
SOCFIN and its subsidiaries operate in twelve African countries and a concession area of approximately 175,000 ha of land.

=== African subsidiaries ===
Business name	Country	Equity	Concession area
SOGB	Ivory Coast	73% through Bereby Finance	34,713 ha
SOCFIN Agriculture Company	Sierra Leone	85%	
Okomu Oil Palm	Nigeria	66%	33,113 ha
Plantations Socfinaf	Ghana	100%	
Socapalm	Cameroon	67%	58,000 ha
Safacam	Cameroon	69%	15,000 ha
Brabanta	Democratic Republic of Congo	99%	29,000 ha
Agripalma Lda	Sao Tome	88%	

== Asian operations ==
Socfin, through Socfinasia, has a stake in Socfindo, an Indonesian-based rubber and oil palm operator. It was formally established in 1930 and went through various stages of restructuring. In 1968, it became a joint venture between Socfin and the Indonesian government.

In Cambodia, Socfin operates rubber plantations in Mondulkiri province through two companies, SOCFIN-KCD and Covipharma. Its economic land concession in the Bousra community is a partnership with a local developer, Khaou Chuly Development, and the area includes approximately 4,270 ha of the Phnom Nam Lyr Wildlife Sanctuary.

== Issues ==
=== Conflicts with local populations ===
In many African communities, oil palm is produced by small-scale farmers, but the activities of SOCFINAF, which operates large oil palm and rubber plantations, have caused discontent among local farmers. Some of this conflict revolves around land control and farmer displacement. In Cameroon, oil palm production is dominated by SOCFINAF's subsidiary Socapalm, which produces 70% of the country's output. The company's use of security agents has caused anger among host communities, who accuse them of preventing farmers from accessing their own crops, while the agents argue that the small-scale farms encroach on Socapalm's concession area.

In Sierra Leone, SOCFIN's agreement with the government and subsequent acquisition of land in the Malen community of the Pujehun region have provoked tension, with some farmers claiming that they did not fully understand the lease agreement between local chiefs, SOCFIN, and the Sierra Leonean government, before signing on to it.

A 2019 report published by the Swiss NGO Bread for All concluded that SOCFIN plantation companies in Liberia had violated customary and, in some cases, private land rights of community members in the course of the plantation's expansions. Based on the report, the local NGO Green Advocates submitted a complaint to the International Finance Corporation. In a response, SOCFIN claimed that the accusations were "greatly exaggerated in its context if not incorrect".

Serious human rights violations by SOCFIN have been reported by local communities in Cameroon, Liberia, and Sierra Leone, leading to the company hiring the environmental consultancy Earthworm Foundation to investigate the claims in 2023. According to the findings, major issues included sexual harassment and gender-based violence at SOCFIN plantations, in addition to industry-related water pollution and environmental degradation impacting communities near the company's oil palm and rubber plantations.
