= Tuck (nickname) =

Tuck or the Tuck is a nickname of:

- William "Tuck" Andress, half of the American jazz duo Tuck & Patti
- Everett E. Kelly (1898–1983), American college football player
- James McIntyre (footballer) (1863–1943), Scottish footballer
- George Tucker Tuck Stainback (1911–1992), American Major League Baseball player
- Thomas Syme (1928–2011), British ice hockey player
- Trinity the Tuck (born 1984), American drag performer Ryan A. Taylor, nicknamed "the Tuck"
- George Tuck Turner (1866–1945), American Major League Baseball player
- Dave Tucker (geologist), American geologist known in his union as "Tuck"
- William Osborne Tuck Tucker (1961-2020), American actor
