= Senator Tuck =

Senator Tuck may refer to:

- Amy Tuck (born 1963), Mississippi State Senate
- William M. Tuck (1896–1983), Virginia State Senate
