= BioAmber =

BioAmber Inc.
- Type: Public company
- Traded as: OTCID Basic: BIOAQ
- Industry: renewable chemicals
- Founded: 2008
- Defunct: 2018
- Fate: Bankrupt
- Headquarters: Montreal, QC, Canada
- Area served: Chapter 15 USA Bankruptcy
- Key people: PWC PriceWaterhouseCoopers
- Products: bio-based succinic acid, bio-based 1,4-butanediol, bio-based disodium succinate

BioAmber Inc. was a Delaware (USA) registered Canadian sustainable chemicals company that was headquartered in Montreal, Quebec, Canada. Its proprietary technology platform combined industrial biotechnology and chemical catalysis to convert renewable feedstock into building block chemicals for use in a wide variety of everyday products including plastics, resins, food additives and personal care products. BioAmber was listed on the New York Stock Exchange between May 2013 and February 2018, under the symbol BIOA. It was also listed on the Toronto Stock Exchange under the same symbol. Bioamber officially ceased operations in August 2018', all directors of the company resigned & PriceWaterhouseCoopers proceeded forward in court authorized control of the company's fate. BioAmber no longer has any offices or facilities in Canada or the United States after completion of a CCAA Insolvency / USA Chapter 15 foreign arrangement, in which the company was liquidated & all major assets were sold off. On November 22, 2019, FINRA, (https://www.finra.org/about) the USA Financial Regulatory Authority officially suspended the company's CUSIP registration thus finalizing the outcome for Bioamber & delisting it from all tradeable stock exchanges.

== History ==
BioAmber was established in 2008 as a result of a spin-off from New York-based Diversified Natural Products (DNP). The company was originally named DNP Green Technology and was based in Princeton, New Jersey. Prior to the spin-off, DNP had established a joint venture with France-based Agro-Industrie Recherches et Développements (ARD) to develop and commercialize bio-based succinic acid. In 2010, DNP Green Technology acquired 100 percent of the joint venture from ARD and changed its corporate name to BioAmber.

After the company was spun off from DNP, it was privately financed in 2009' by a group of institutional investors led by Sofinnova Partners, Mitsui & Co., Samsung Ventures and the Cliffton Group. In 2011 and 2012, Naxos Capital Partners and Lanxess became investors in the company, which raised a total of $87 million over three rounds of financing between 2009 and 2012. In May 2013, BioAmber completed its initial public offering on the New York Stock Exchange under the symbol BIOA, raising $80 million in gross proceeds and issuing warrants for an additional $44 million in common stock.

== Companies' Creditors Arrangement Act (CCAA) ==
On May 4, 2018, BioAmber filed for bankruptcy protection under Chapter 11 in the US and entered into CCAA protection in Canada, with the intent of restructuring the company. After failure to secure additional financing could not be negotiated, the proceedings moved to a US Chapter 15 bankruptcy and CCAA liquidation of the company. The court monitor overseeing the case was PriceWaterhouseCoopers.

On October 22, 2018, under the CCAA / USA Chapter 15, a transaction occurred for substantially all of BioAmber's assets between BioAmber and LCY Biosciences "LCYB", the designated purchaser in the joint venture formed between Visolis and LCY Chemical Corp. In a turn of events, LCY Chemical Corp was itself acquired by KKR in a $1.56 billion acquisition which saw LCY itself taken "private". The KKR / LCY transaction closed at the end of January 2019. According to a letter of intent, "Letter of Intent for Investment in BioAmber Inc." submitted by Deepak Dugar, the President of Visolis, LCY Biosciences intends to own and continue to operate the bio-based succinic acid plant at Sarnia with the addition of viable alternative products added.

== Technology ==
BioAmber produced bio-based succinic acid by fermenting sugars. The company used a proprietary yeast that it has exclusively licensed from Cargill. Cargill originally identified a yeast strain that has the ability to ferment at a low pH. Cargill modified that strain for the production of lactic acid and has been using that new yeast strain at commercial scale since 2009. BioAmber collaborated with Cargill to develop from the original strain a new one that could ferment at a low pH and tolerate high concentrations of succinic acid, giving it a distinct advantage over other microorganisms producing succinic acid via fermentation. BioAmber had designed its former commercial plant in Sarnia for the production of bio-based succinic acid to operate with its yeast technology.

BioAmber had a license from Johnson Matthey Davy Technologies a catalyst technology that converts bio-based succinic acid into bio-based 1,4-butanediol (BDO). The technology involves the vapor phase hydrogenation of succinic acid ester into BDO and tetrahydrofuran (THF). JM Davy is reportedly the global leader in BDO and THF technology, with 14 licenses deployed representing approximately 800,000 tons per year of installed BDO and THF capacity, or 25% of worldwide capacity. Their technology produced BDO/THF from maleic anhydride, a petrochemical. The first step in that route converts MA to succinic acid; thus succinic is an alternative feedstock. JM Davy has adjusted its process and tested BioAmber's bio-succinic acid so it can substitute maleic anhydride without impacting performance, process economics or product quality.

== Sustainability ==
The use of fermentation to produce building block chemicals offers the prospect of an improved carbon footprint and lower energy intensity than the petrochemical route to the same chemicals.

== Manufacturing ==
BioAmber produced bio-based succinic acid from January 2010 to December 2014 at a large demonstration plant owned and operated by the company's former joint venture partner, ARD. The demonstration plant operated at the 350,000 liter fermenter scale, which at the time was one of the largest scale fermentations among start-up companies in the field of bio-based chemicals. BioAmber claim to have gained extensive experience from operating this plant for five years and incorporated the learning and improvements into the design of its commercial plant in Sarnia, Canada.

BioAmber established a joint venture with Mitsui & Co. to build and operate a bio-succinic acid plant in Sarnia, Ontario with a manufacturing capacity of 30,000 metric tons (66,000,000 lb) per year, with BioAmber owning 60% of the venture. The facility began construction in August 2013 and began commercial operations in November 2015. The cost of construction was US$141 million and it created 60 full-time jobs. It is the world's largest bio-based succinic acid plant.

BioAmber's Integrated Management Systems in Sarnia were ISO 9001:2008 registered, ISO 14001:2004 registered, OHSAS 18001:2007 registered, and FSSC 22000 registered within four months of operational start-up.

== Markets ==
Succinic acid is a platform chemical that can be used in a broad range of markets, from high value niche applications such as personal care products and food additives, to large volume applications such as bioplastics, pigments, plasticizers, polyurethanes, resins and coatings. In 2004, the United States Department of Energy (USDOE) published a report on "Top Value-Added Chemicals from Biomass," identifying the top opportunities for the production of chemicals from biomass. The study prioritized twelve chemicals, from a group of over 300 possible building blocks that could be most effectively manufactured from sugars. Bio-succinic acid was recognized as one of the renewable building block chemicals with the greatest technical feasibility and commercial potential.

Historically, the high cost of producing succinic acid from petroleum feedstock limited its use to a narrow range of applications such as pharmaceuticals and food ingredients. As a result, based on 2011 estimates, the market for petroleum-based succinic acid was approximately 51,000 metric tons per year, representing a market size of approximately $350 million. However, market research firms and consultants predict that manufacturing bio-succinic acid will make succinic acid economically feasible for use in greater volumes across a spectrum of new applications. A study published in September 2013 by Transparency Market Research projects that the global market for succinic acid will grow at a CAGR of 19.4% between 2012 and 2018. A study published in August 2012 by Roland Berger Strategy Consultants projects that the succinic acid market will grow at a compounded annual growth rate of between 25% and 30% through 2020, when the global market size is expected to be between 500,000 and 700,000 metric tons.

The major uses of 1,4 BDO are in the production of THF and polybutylene terephthalate, or PBT. THF is used to produce spandex fibers and other performance polymers, resins, solvents and printing inks for plastics. PBT is an engineering-grade thermoplastic that combines excellent mechanical and electrical properties with robust chemical resistance. The automotive and electronics industries heavily rely on PBT to produce connectors, insulators, wheel covers, gearshift knobs and reinforcing beams.

== Awards ==
- 2009 Frost & Sullivan Biorenewable Chemicals Technology Award
- 2011 U.S. EPA Presidential Green Chemistry Challenge Award
- 2011 ICIS Best Business Innovation Award
- 2012 Biotech Canada Gold Leaf Award - Early Stage Company of the Year: Industrial & Agricultural
- 2013 4.5 Stars Environmental Leader
