= Thierry, Count of Limburg Stirum =

Belgian historian and politician

Count Thierry de Limburg Stirum (11 April 1827 – 6 March 1911) was a Belgian historian, bibliophile, and politician who served as a Senator from 1878 to 1900.

== Early life ==
Count Thierry Marie Joseph de Limburg Stirum was born in Antwerp, United Kingdom of the Netherlands on 11 April 1827. He was the son of Willem de Limburg Stirum (1795–1889) and Albertine de Pret de Calesberg (1800–1856). His father, who was of Dutch and Gelders origin, served in the French imperial army and later in the Dutch army after 1815. Following the creation of Belgium, Thierry received Belgian citizenship in 1841.

== Career ==
Thierry de Limburg Stirum was Doctor in Law (KU Leuven) and Belgian senator for the department of Ostend-Veurne-Diksmuide from 1878 to 1900.

He was president of the Conseil Heraldique and president of the Royal Commission for Ancient Laws and Ordinances.

A famous bibliophile, he became a member of the Society for History of Bruges in 1870, known under the name 'Société d'Emulation'. From 1891 until his death he was president of that Society.

== Personal life ==
In 1856, he married Countess Marie-Thérèse de Thiennes Leyenburg et de Rumbeke (1828–1909), a daughter of Count François de Thiennes, Chamberlain of King Guillaume of the Netherlands and Baroness Asterie de Draeck. Before her death in Brussels in 1909, they were the parents of four children who had numerous descendants, including:

- Henri de Limburg Stirum (1864–1953), mayor of Rumbeke.
- Everard de Limburg Stirum (1868–1938), mayor of Huldenberg.

Count de Limburg-Stirum died in Brussels on 6 March 1911.

== Publications ==
- Description des sceaux de quelques seigneurs de Flandres, Brugge, 1869
- La Cour des Comtes de Flandre, leurs officiers héréditaires, Ghent, 1878.
- Codex Diplomaticus Flandriae, 1296-1327, Brugge, 1879-1889.
- Flandriae inde ab anno 1926 ad usque 1325 (...), Brugge, 1879.
- Le Cartulaire de Louis de Male, comte de Flandre, Brugge, 1893–1901

== Ancestry ==
Thierry's ancestors in three generations
Thierry de Limburg Stirum	Father: Willem Bernard, Count of Limburg Stirum (1795-1889), settles in Belgium and takes Belgian nationality	Paternal Grandfather: Samuel John, Count of Limburg Stirum (1754-1824), General-Major, Member of the 'Notabelenvergadering' (1814), Member of the Senate, Knight of the Order of the Netherlands Lion, Knight Grd Cross of the Military William Order	Paternal Great-grandfather: Albert Dominique, Count of Limburg Stirum
Thierry de Limburg Stirum	Father: Willem Bernard, Count of Limburg Stirum (1795-1889), settles in Belgium and takes Belgian nationality	Paternal Grandfather: Samuel John, Count of Limburg Stirum (1754-1824), General-Major, Member of the 'Notabelenvergadering' (1814), Member of the Senate, Knight of the Order of the Netherlands Lion, Knight Grd Cross of the Military William Order	Paternal Great-grandmother: Elisabeth Gratiana Sayer
Thierry de Limburg Stirum	Father: Willem Bernard, Count of Limburg Stirum (1795-1889), settles in Belgium and takes Belgian nationality	Paternal Grandmother: Johanna Sara, Jonkvrouw Reynst (1762-1837)	Paternal Great-grandfather: Vice-Admiral Jonkheer Pieter Hendrik Reynst, Admiral of Holland and West-Friesland
Thierry de Limburg Stirum	Father: Willem Bernard, Count of Limburg Stirum (1795-1889), settles in Belgium and takes Belgian nationality	Paternal Grandmother: Johanna Sara, Jonkvrouw Reynst (1762-1837)	Paternal Great-grandmother: Johanna Sara Bicker
Thierry de Limburg Stirum	Mother: Albertine de Pret Roose de Calesberg (1800-1856)	Maternal Grandfather: Jacques Paul Joseph de Pret Roose de Calesberg, Lord of Calesberg (1762-1817)	Maternal Great-grandfather: Arnould François Joseph Bruno de Pret
Thierry de Limburg Stirum	Mother: Albertine de Pret Roose de Calesberg (1800-1856)	Maternal Grandfather: Jacques Paul Joseph de Pret Roose de Calesberg, Lord of Calesberg (1762-1817)	Maternal Great-grandmother: Marie Pétronille Moretus
Thierry de Limburg Stirum	Mother: Albertine de Pret Roose de Calesberg (1800-1856)	Maternal Grandmother: Jeanne Marie Josephe, Countess Roose de Baisy	Maternal Great-grandfather: Jean Alexandre Joseph Roose, Count of Baisy and Baron of Bouchout (1724-1784)
Thierry de Limburg Stirum	Mother: Albertine de Pret Roose de Calesberg (1800-1856)	Maternal Grandmother: Jeanne Marie Josephe, Countess Roose de Baisy	Maternal Great-grandmother: Marie Anne van de Werve (1742-1798)
