= John Mills (Conservative politician) =

Colonel Sir John Mills

Member of Parliament for New Forest and Christchurch
- In office 1932–1945
- Preceded by: Wilfrid Ashley
- Succeeded by: Oliver Crosthwaite-Eyre

Personal details
- Born: John Digby Mills; 29 September 1879
- Died: 2 July 1972 (aged 92)
- Party: Conservative
- Spouse: Carola Tuck (after 1918)
- Parent(s): Rev. Cecil Mills; Anne Henrietta Frances Nicolls
- Education: Charterhouse School
- Alma mater: Oriel College, Oxford

Colonel Sir John Digby Mills (29 September 1879 – 2 July 1972) was a British Conservative Party politician and British Army officer. He served as Member of Parliament for New Forest and Christchurch from 1932 to 1945.

== Early life ==
Mills was born on 29 September 1879 to The Reverend Cecil Mills and Anne Henrietta Frances Mills, née Nicolls. He was christened on 2 November 1879. He was educated at Charterhouse, then an all-boys public school in Surrey. He studied at Oriel College, Oxford, graduating with a Bachelor of Arts (BA) degree.

== Career ==
In 1901, Mills was commissioned as a second lieutenant in the Warwickshire Yeomanry of the Imperial Yeomanry, British Army. He saw active service in Egypt, Gallipoli, and France. He left the British Army in 1920, with the rank of major.

On 2 September 1939, Mills became a lieutenant in the National Defence Companies. In 1940, he was a group organiser for the Local Defence Volunteers. From 1941 to 1943, he was commander of the New Forest Group of the Home Guard, and held the rank of colonel. From 1943 to 1945, he served as second in command of the Hampshire Zone.

=== Political career ===
Mills was elected as the Member of Parliament for New Forest and Christchurch between 1932 and 1945. From 1943 to 1945, he was the Second Church Estates Commissioner, the link between the Church of England and the House of Commons.

=== Church career ===
Mills was a Member of House of Laity between 1944 and 1960, and a Church Commissioner between 1948 and 1958.

== Personal life ==
On 16 June 1918, Mills married Carola Marshall Tuck (1889–1995) at the British Consulate-General in Alexandria, Egypt. Carola was the daughter of Somerville Pinkney Tuck and Emily Rosalie Snowden (née Marshall) Tuck and sister of diplomat Somerville Pinkney Tuck. Together they lived at Bisterne Manor in Ringwood, Hampshire and Taverham Hall in Norfolk, and had three sons, including:

- John Micklethwait Mills OBE (1919–2009), a Maj. who married Prudence Mercy Emmeline Matthews, youngest daughter of Sir Ronald Matthews.
- Giles Hallam Mills CVO CB OBE (1922–2011), a Maj.-Gen. of the Royal Green Jackets who married his cousin, Emily Snowden Hallam Tuck, a daughter of William Hallam Tuck, in 1947.

== Knighthood and death ==
Mills was knighted in 1958 and died on 2 July 1972.
