= Somerville Pinkney Tuck (judge) =

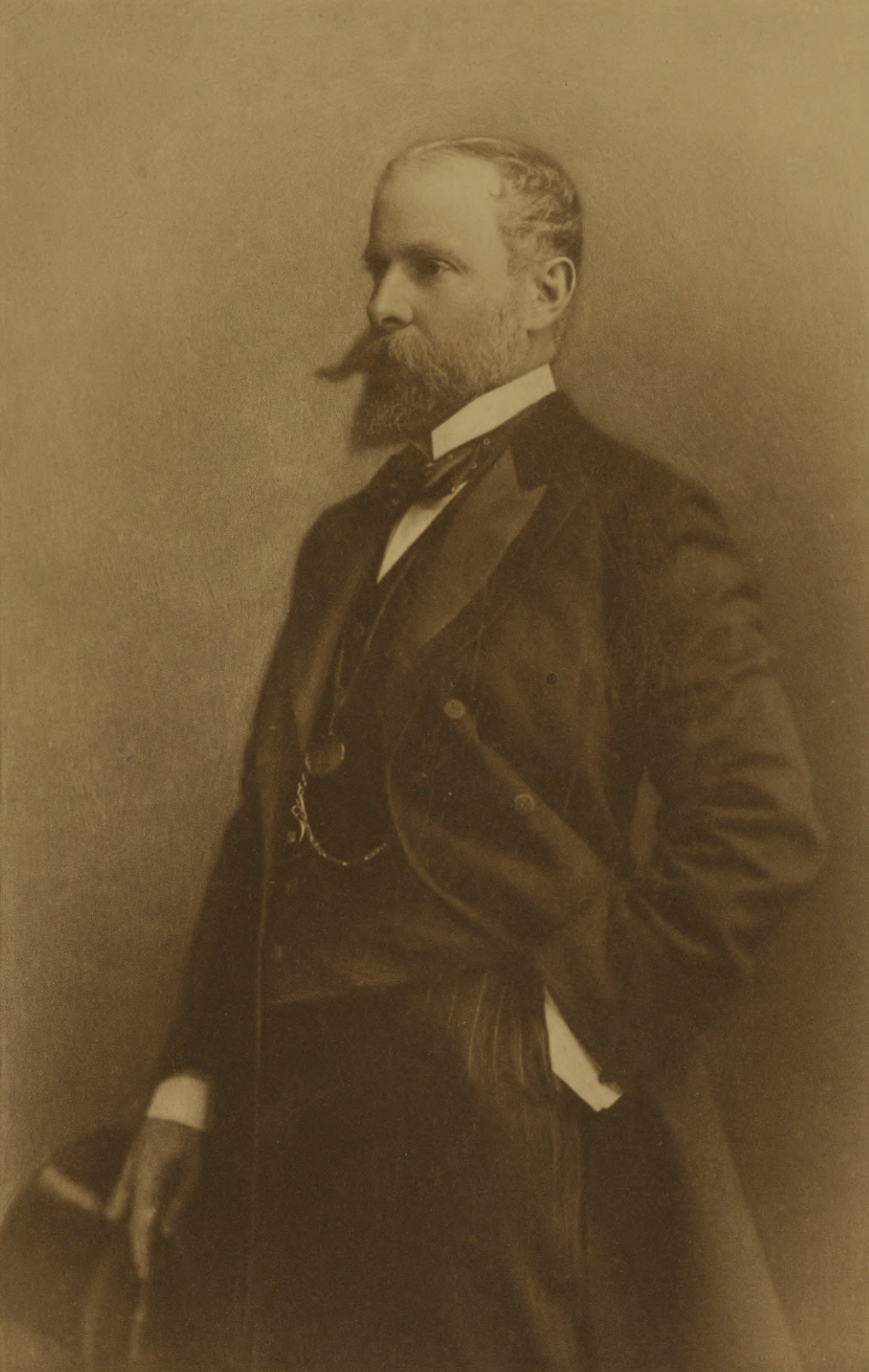
- Judge Tuck, as depicted in The Homely Diary of a Diplomat in the East, 1917.

Judge of the Mixed Courts of Egypt of the First Instance
- In office 1894–1908
- Preceded by: Ernest Howard Crosby

Personal details
- Born: September 24, 1848 Annapolis, Maryland
- Died: April 14, 1923 (aged 74) Menton, France
- Spouse: Emily Rosalie Snowden Marshall
- Relations: Hudson Snowden Marshall (brother-in-law)
- Children: 4, including Somerville Jr. and Alexander
- Parent(s): William Hallam Tuck; Margaret Sprigg Bowie Chew
- Education: St. John's College; University of Virginia
- Awards: Legion of Honour

Somerville Pinkney Tuck (September 24, 1848 – April 14, 1923) was an American judge who served on the international Mixed Courts of Egypt and was regarded as "one of the leading jurists and lawyers of Europe."

== Early life ==
Tuck was born in Annapolis, Maryland on September 24, 1848. He was a son of Judge William Hallam Tuck (1808–1884) and Margaret Sprigg Bowie (née Chew) Tuck (1818–1885). His younger brother was Philemon Hallam Tuck. His father was a Judge of the Maryland Court of Appeals from 1851 to 1861 and President of First National Bank of Annapolis.

His paternal grandparents were William Archable Tuck and Cave Williams (née Mulliken) Tuck. His maternal grandparents were Philemon Lloyd Chew (who was twice a member of the Governor's Council) and Ann Maria Bowie (née Brookes) Chew. Tuck's mother was the great-niece of Gov. Robert Bowie and a granddaughter of Maj. Benjamin Brookes, of the Maryland Line during the Revolutionary War.

Tuck was educated at St. John's College and studied law at the University of Virginia with the class of 1869.

== Career ==
After being admitted to the bar, he began practicing law in New York City in 1882 with Gray & Davenport during which time he worked closely with John Clinton Gray. In his work, he was frequently called to Paris, where he became fluent in the language. "From 1882 to 1885, he was the Commissioner of the Court of Alabama Claims, and in 1885 was appointed by Secretary Bayard as special agent to search for evidence in England, France, Spain, Belgium, and the West Indies in relation to the French spoliation claims, at which time he secured evidence of the capture and condemnation of more than 1,500 vessels."

In 1888, Tuck was appointed U.S. Assistant Commissioner-General to the Paris Exposition, under Gen. William B. Franklin, spending eighteen months in Paris for the work. For his efforts, he was awarded the Commandeur de la Legion d'honneur at the close of the exposition. Tuck also assisted with the World's Columbian Exposition in Chicago in 1893.

In 1894, President Grover Cleveland recommended Tuck to succeed Ernest Howard Crosby as one of the judges of the Mixed Courts of Egypt, a mixed tribunal which decided questions between native and foreign populations. He was appointed in May 1894 Judge of the Mixed Court of the First Instance at Mansoura, Egypt by the Khedive Abbas II of Egypt and three years later was made Presiding Justice of the Court and was transferred to Cairo in 1897. In November 1908, upon the recommendation of President Theodore Roosevelt, he was chosen as a Judge of the Mixed Court of Appeals and was stationed in Alexandria, where he stayed until his retirement in 1920.

== Personal life ==
Tuck married Emily Rosalie Snowden Marshall (1858–1940), a daughter of Sara Rebecca Nicholls (née Snowden) Marshall and Col. Charles Marshall of Baltimore, a Confederate Adjutant and aide-de-camp to General Robert E. Lee. Emily's father was a grand-nephew of Chief Justice John Marshall, and among her five brothers was attorney Hudson Snowden Marshall. Together, they were the parents of:

- Carola Marshall Tuck (1889–1995), who married British soldier John Digby Mills, later MP, in 1918.
- William Hallam Tuck (1890–1965), who married Belgian heiress Hilda Bunge, a daughter of Édouard Bunge.
- Somerville Pinkney Tuck (1891–1967), a diplomat who married Beatrice Beck, only daughter of former U.S. Representative and Solicitor General James M. Beck, in 1924. They divorced in 1934 and he married heiress Katherine Whitney (née Demme) Douglas (1897–1981) in 1936.
- Alexander John Marshall Tuck (1892–1955), who married Eugenie Ambrose Philbin (1893–1931), a daughter of Eugene A. Philbin, in 1923. After her death, he married Margaret (née Screven) White (1903–1964), daughter of Franklin Buchanan Screven, in 1932. They divorced (she later married Angier Biddle Duke) and he married Princess Donna Christiana (née Torlonia) Lord, a daughter of Marino Torlonia, 4th Prince of Civitella-Cesi, in 1942. They also divorced and he married Edith Eleanor (née Holt) Richmond (1898–1982), a daughter of Frank A. Holt, in 1946.

Tuck died in Menton in the Provence-Alpes-Côte d'Azur region on the French Riviera, close to the Italian border, on April 14, 1923. His widow died at their daughter's home, Bisterne Manor in New Forest, England, in 1940.
