= William George Tuck =

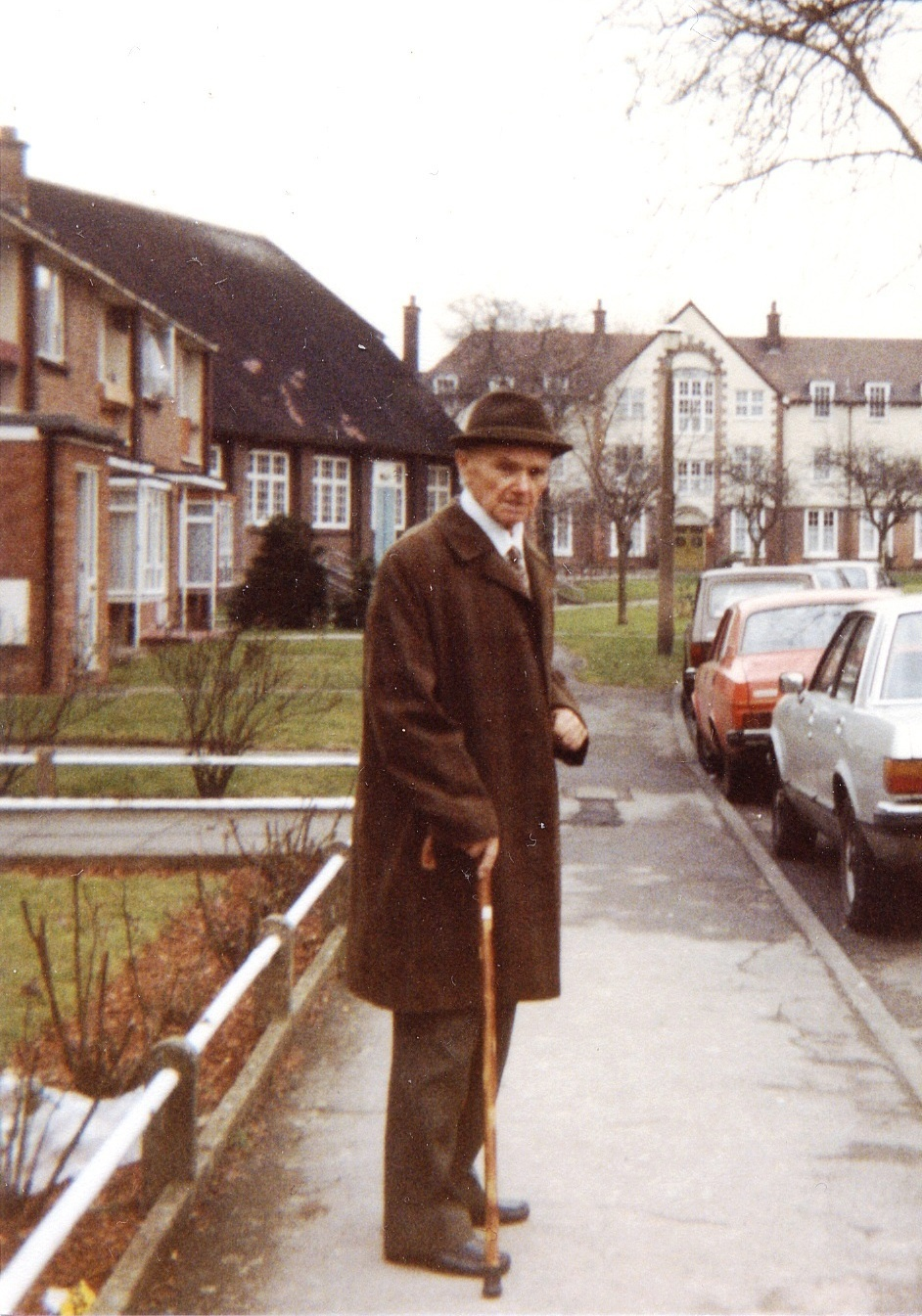
- William George Tuck in 1987
- Born: William George Tuck; 25 May 1900; East Ham, London
- Died: 11 January 1999 (aged 98); Wanstead, London
- Known for: Painter

William George Tuck (1900–1999) was an English watercolourist from east London. A toolmaker by profession, he was an amateur painter whose recognition came in later life.

Tuck was adjudged to be the best artist in the water colour section at the seventh Exhibition of the South Eastern Federation of Art Societies at the Guildhall in London in 1957 and again in 1962. In 1974, at the age of 74, he displayed 50 paintings at the Passmore Edwards Museum in Romford when he was chairman of the South Eastern Federation of Art Societies. He twice had pictures accepted by the Royal Academy, but ultimately these were not hung.

Tuck painted English landscapes around Suffolk and Essex including Lavenham, Leigh-on-Sea, Heybridge, Tilbury and Maldon. However, many of his more colourful and lively paintings were on Mediterranean subjects in Malta, Cyprus and Spain. He also visited Portugal and the Loire, France. He always painted from life, never from photographs.

Tuck died on 11 January 1999 at the age of 98.
