= William Hallam Tuck =

American judge (1808–1884)

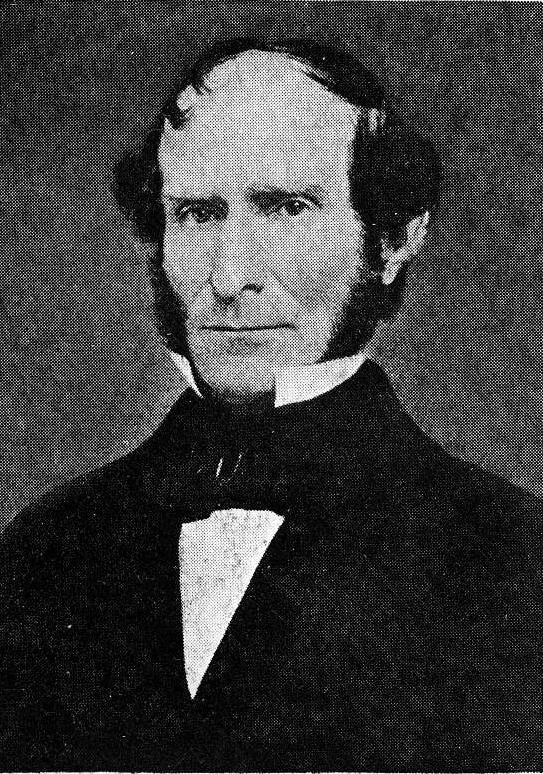
- Born: 20 November 1808; Annapolis
- Died: 17 March 1884; Annapolis
- Occupations: Lawyer; judge; businessperson
- Employers: Baltimore and Ohio Railroad; St. John's College
- Children: 4, including Somerville Pinkney Tuck

William Hallam Tuck (November 20, 1808 – March 17, 1884) was a lawyer, judge, and banker who served as a justice of the Maryland Court of Appeals from 1851 to 1861.

== Early life ==
Tuck was born in Annapolis, Maryland, on November 20, 1808. He was the son of William Archable Tuck and Cave Williams (née Mulliken) Tuck. His grandfather was Revolutionary War soldier William Tuck and his uncle was Washington Greene Tuck, a prominent Annapolis furniture maker who was Superintendent of the Maryland State House and a veteran of the War of 1812.

He attended St. John's College in Annapolis, graduating in 1827.

== Career ==
Tuck was admitted to the bar and began practicing law. He was a member of the House of Delegates for Prince George's County from 1836 to 1843, during which he served as Speaker of the House of Delegates in 1837. From 1872 to 1875, he served in the Maryland Senate representing Anne Arundel County. In 1851, he was a member of Maryland's Constitutional Convention. Tuck was appointed as a Judge of the Circuit Court of Anne Arundel and Calvert counties by Governor Augustus Bradford before becoming a Judge of the Maryland Court of Appeals from 1851 until 1861, when he was defeated for re-election to the court by a Unionist candidate, Richard Bowie of Montgomery County.

Also prominent in business, he was a director of the Baltimore and Ohio Railroad. He also served as president of the First National Bank of Annapolis, the Citizens' Bank of Annapolis, and the Traders' National Bank of Baltimore. He was also a member of the Board of Governors and Visitors of his alma mater, St. John's College.

At the time of his death, he was president of the Board of County Commissioners, having been appointed to that office by Governor William Thomas Hamilton.

== Personal life ==
On June 22, 1843, Tuck was married to Margaret Sprigg Bowie Chew, a daughter of Ann Maria Bowie (née Brookes) Chew and Philemon Lloyd Chew, twice a member of the Governor's Council. She was also the great niece of Gov. Robert Bowie. Together, they were the parents of:

- Maria Louisa Chew Tuck (b. 1845), who never married.
- Somerville Pinkney Tuck (1848–1923), who married Emily Rosalie Snowden Marshall, daughter of Col. Charles Marshall of Baltimore, a Confederate Adjutant and aide-de-camp to General Robert E. Lee.
- Philemon Hallam Tuck (1852–1917), a lawyer who married Grace Devries, a daughter of William Devries. After her death, he married Dorcas V. Jamieson, daughter of Philip Jamieson of Toronto.
- Francis Holland, who died in infancy

Tuck died in Annapolis on March 17, 1884. His widow died almost one year later on March 12, 1885.

=== Descendants ===
Through his son Somerville, he was a grandfather of William Hallam Tuck, diplomat Somerville Pinkney Tuck, and businessman Alexander John Marshall Tuck.

Political offices
Preceded by Newly reconfigured court	Judge of the Maryland Court of Appeals; 1851–1861	Succeeded by Richard Bowie
