= S. Pinkney Tuck =

American diplomat

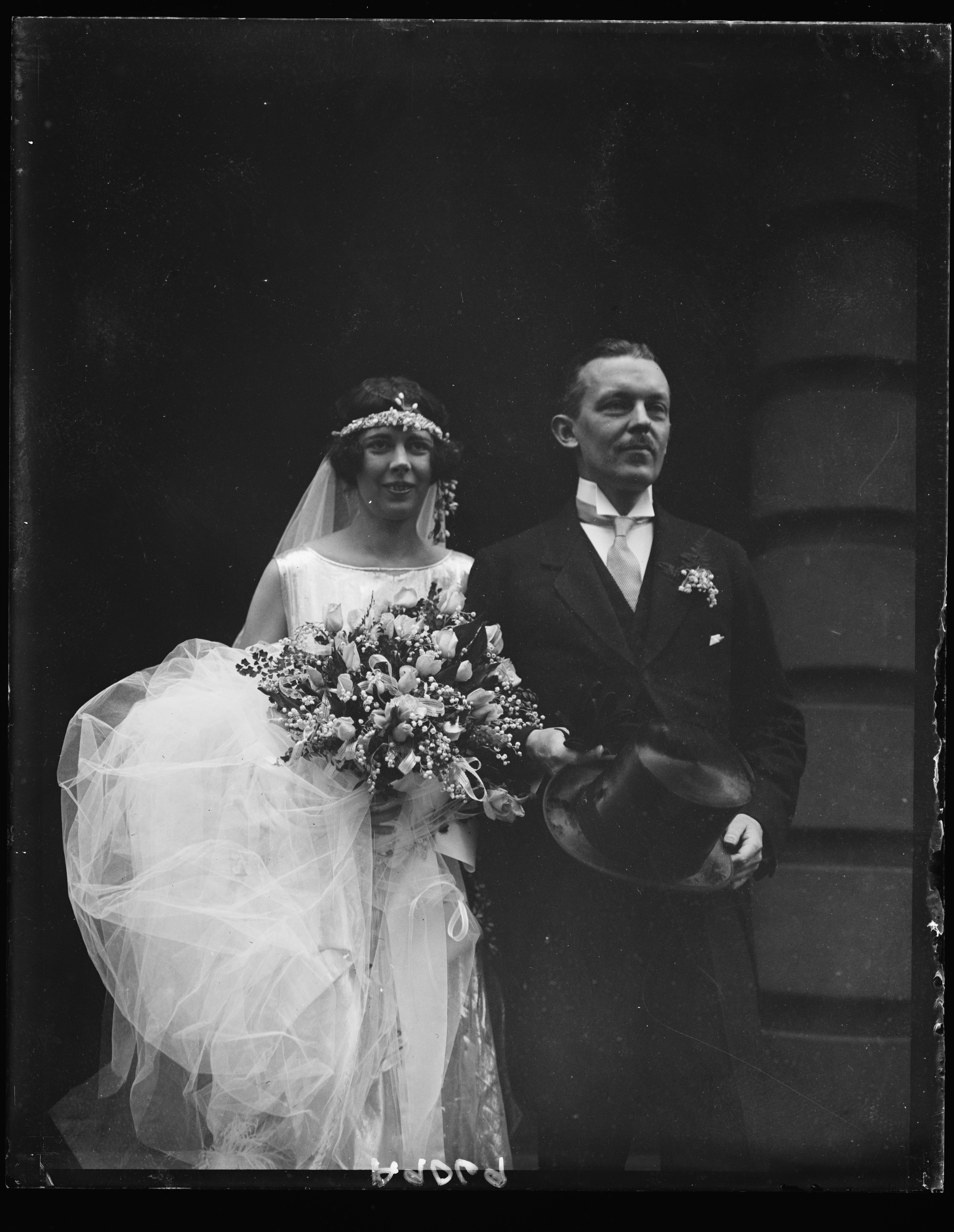

1st United States Ambassador to Egypt
- In office October 10, 1946 – May 30, 1948
- President: Harry S. Truman
- Preceded by: Himself (as Minister)
- Succeeded by: Stanton Griffis

United States Minister to Egypt
- In office June 14, 1944 – October 10, 1946
- President: Franklin D. Roosevelt; Harry S. Truman
- Preceded by: Alexander Comstock Kirk
- Succeeded by: Himself (as Ambassador)

Personal details
- Born: Somerville Pinkney Tuck Jr. May 3, 1891 New Brighton, New York
- Died: April 21, 1967 (aged 75) Paris, France
- Spouses: Beatrice Beck (m. 1924; div. 1934) Katherine Whitney Demme Douglas (m. 1936)
- Relations: Charles Marshall (grandfather); William Hallam Tuck (grandfather); Alexander J. M. Tuck (brother)
- Children: 2
- Parent(s): Somerville Pinkney Tuck; Emily Rosalie Snowden Marshall
- Education: Dartmouth College

Somerville Pinkney Tuck Jr. (May 3, 1891 – April 21, 1967) was an American diplomat.

== Early life ==
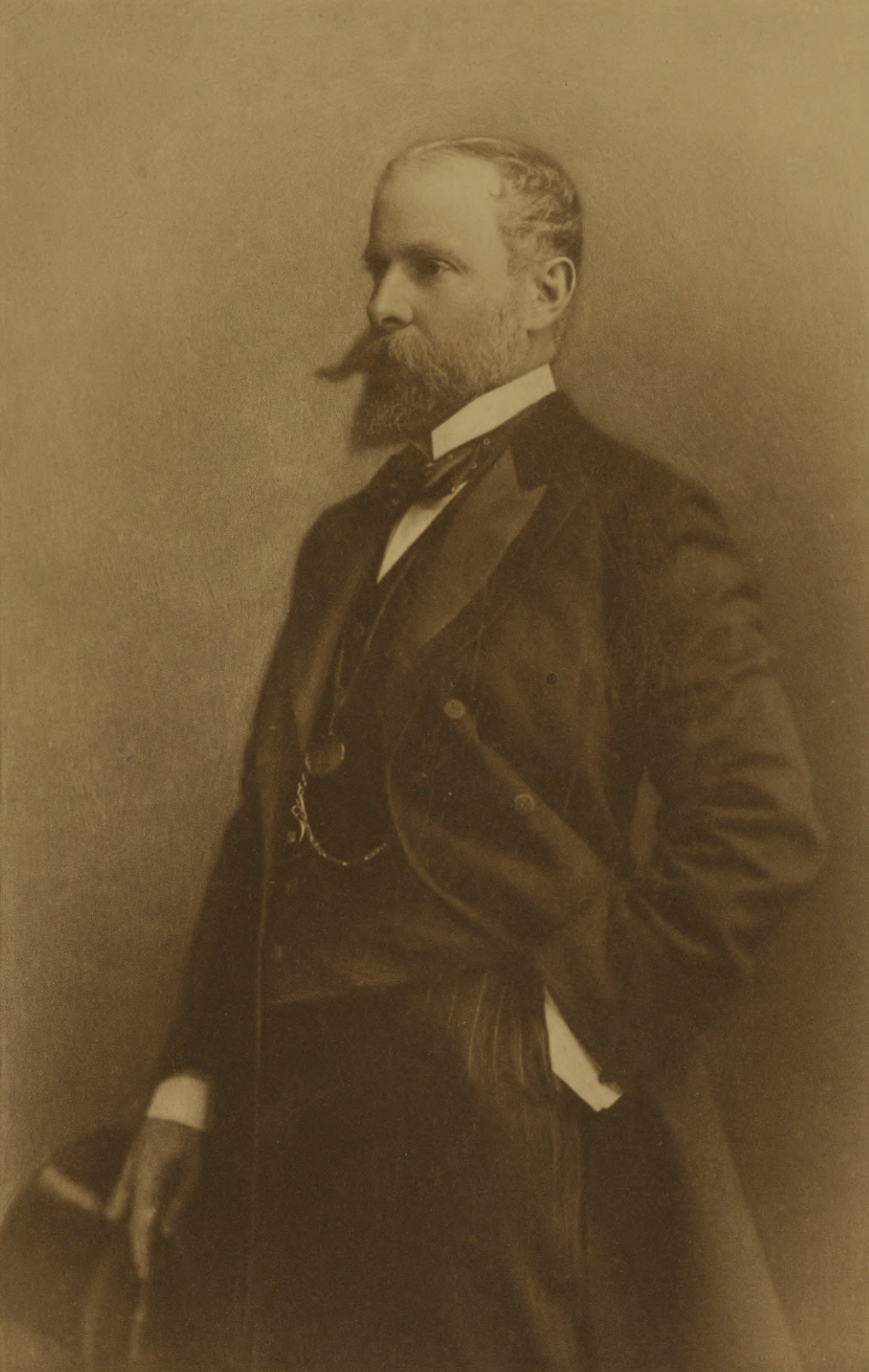
His father, Judge Somerville Pinkney Tuck

Tuck was born on May 3, 1891, in New Brighton, Staten Island, New York, a son of Somerville Pinkney Tuck (1848–1923) and Emily Rosalie Snowden (née Marshall) Tuck (1858–1940), who died at her home in Bisterne in New Forest, England, in April 1940. His father had been presiding judge of the International Court of Egypt. His siblings were William Hallem Tuck, Alexander John Marshall Tuck (who married four times), and Carola Marshall (née Tuck) Mills (wife of British MP Sir John Mills).

His paternal grandparents were Margaret Sprigg Bowie (née Chew) Tuck and William Hallam Tuck, a Judge of the Maryland Court of Appeals from 1851 to 1861. His maternal grandparents were Sara Rebecca Nicholls (née Snowden) Marshall (daughter of Col. Thomas Snowden) and Col. Charles Marshall of Baltimore, a Confederate Adjutant and aide-de-camp to General Robert E. Lee. Among his five maternal uncles were attorney Hudson Snowden Marshall.

Tuck went to boarding school in Switzerland, Germany and the United States before attending Dartmouth College, where he was known as a bon vivant, and graduated with the class of 1913.

== Career ==
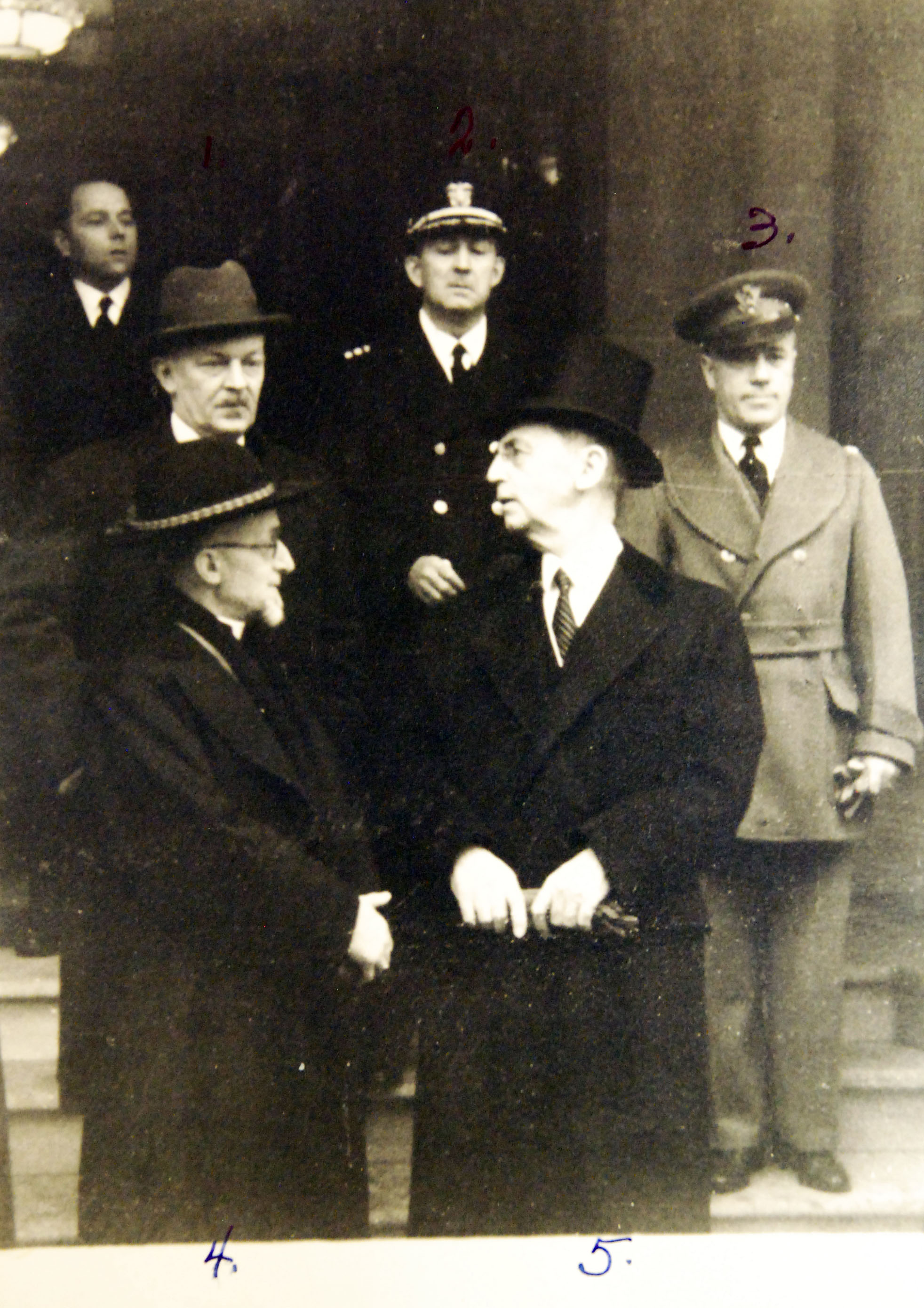
S. Pinkney Tuck; Cmmdr. Sabalot; Lt.-Col. Schow; Monseigneur Valerio Valeri; and Ambassador William D. Leahy, at the Hôtel du Parc in Vichy, France, January 1942

Upon his graduation from Dartmouth, he joined the diplomatic service of the U.S. Department of State. Early in his career, in the early 1920s Tuck was the American Consul at Vladivostok. In 1932, during the recess of the World Disarmament Conference in Geneva that Tuck was attending as an expert to the American delegation, he was designated first secretary of the legation at Prague, cancelling earlier plans to appoint him first secretary of the legation at Budapest.

Tuck, during World War II, was the Foreign Service Officer who served as Chargé d'affaires to Vichy France until the Vichy regime severed diplomatic relations with the U.S. on November 8, 1942.

After leaving that post, Tuck became the last envoy and first United States Ambassador to Egypt being appointed by President Roosevelt on May 4, 1944. He presented his credentials as Envoy Extraordinary and Minister Plenipotentiary on June 14, 1944. Upon the legation being raised to Embassy status, he was appointed the first Ambassador Extraordinary and Plenipotentiary to Egypt on September 19, 1946, presenting his credentials on October 10, 1946, (Note: Tusk was commissioned during a recess of the Senate. He was recommissioned on January 13, 1947, after confirmation.) serving until he left his post on May 30, 1948. Tuck was "well regarded in Cairo for his ability to speak Egyptian and Arabic fluently and for his talents as a raconteur. He went shopping in the bazaars on his own and excited comment by bargaining with merchants in their own language."

After retiring from government service, he served on the board of directors of the Suez Canal in the 1950s.

== Personal life ==
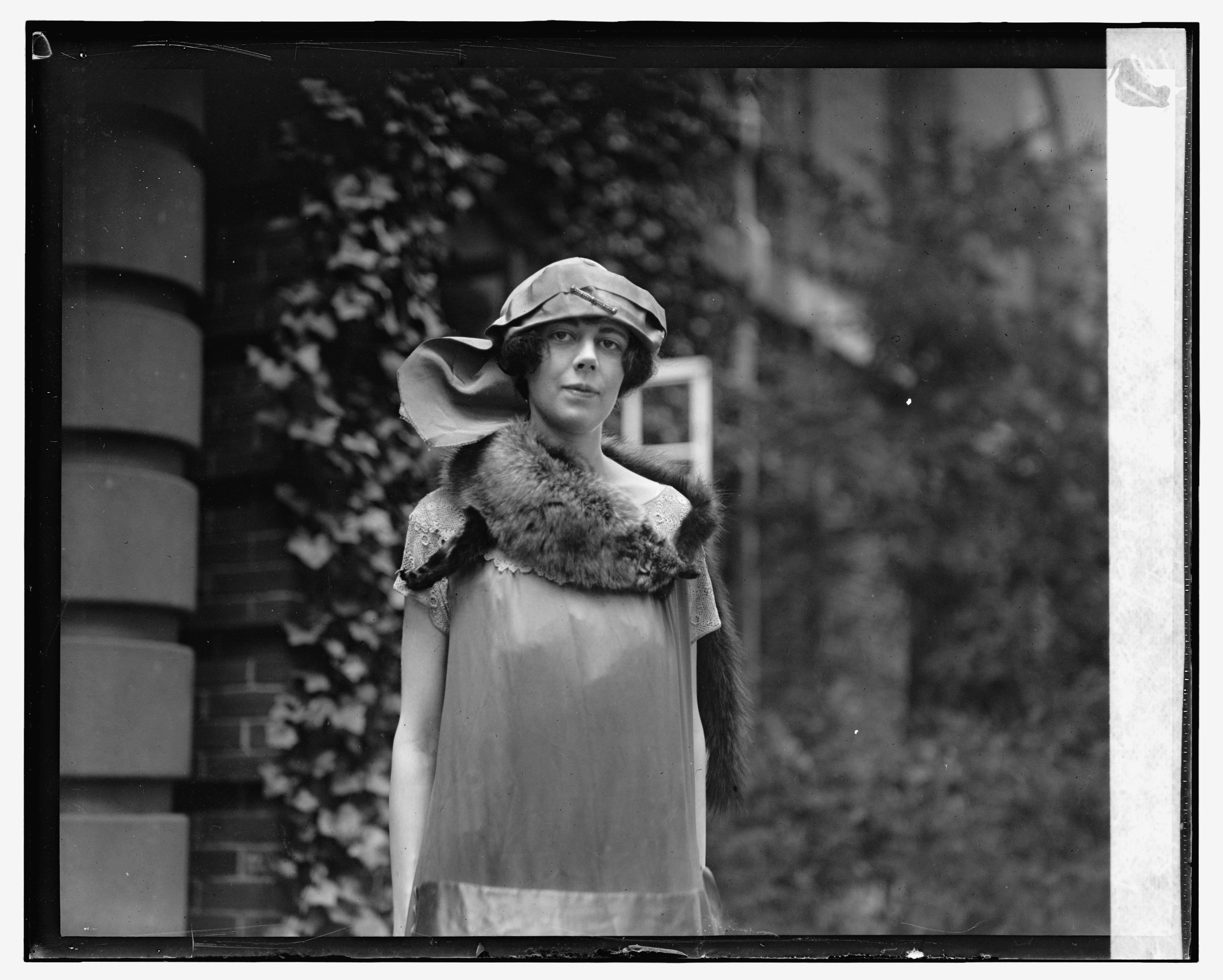
His first wife, Beatrice Beck

In October 1924, Tuck was married to Beatrice Mitchell Beck in Washington, D.C., at St. Thomas's Church in Dupont Circle in a ceremony attended by President and Mrs. Calvin Coolidge. Beatrice, later a friend of the Duke and Duchess of Windsor, was a daughter of former U.S. Representative James M. Beck, who was at the time President Coolidge's Solicitor General. Among Tuck's ushers at the wedding were the Hon. John Francis Amherst Cecil (the first secretary of the British Embassy in Washington), at whose wedding to Cornelia Stuyvesant Vanderbilt Tuck had been an usher four months earlier; also Raymond Cox, Donald Rodgers, Cmmdr. Arthur L. Bristol, William J. Curtis, the bride's brother James M. Beck Jr., and William Hallem Tuck, his brother as best man. Before their divorce in 1934, they were the parents of:

- James Marshall Tuck (1925–2003), who married Mary Chase Nicholson, daughter of William Goldsborough Nicholson, in 1956.
- David Hallam Tuck (1931–2002), a stockbroker.

After their divorce, Beatrice married Snowden Andrews Fahnestock (a grandson of banker Harris C. Fahnestock) in 1936. In 1936, Tuck remarried to heiress Katherine Whitney (née Demme) Douglas (1897–1981) in Paris. Katherine was the former wife of First National Bank president D. Dwight Douglas.

Tuck died at the American Hospital in Paris in April 1967. His widow died in 1981 in Grosse Pointe Farms, Michigan.

Diplomatic posts
Preceded by None	U.S. Ambassador to Egypt; 1946–1948	Succeeded by Stanton Griffis
