= Bunge Global =

Swiss-domiciled agribusiness company

Bunge Global SA
- Type: Public (Société Anonyme)
- Traded as: NYSE: BG; S&P 500 component
- Industry: Food processing
- Founded: 1818; 208 years ago
- Founder: Johann P. G. Bunge
- Headquarters: St. Louis, Missouri, U.S. (operational); Geneva, Switzerland (legal)
- Area served: Worldwide
- Key people: Mark Zenuk (chairman); Greg Heckman (CEO)
- Products: List of products
- Revenue: ▼US$53.1 billion (2024)
- Operating income: ▼US$1.62 billion (2024)
- Net income: ▼US$1.14 billion (2024)
- Total assets: ▼US$24.9 billion (2024)
- Total equity: ▼US$9.91 billion (2024)
- Number of employees: 23,000 (2024)
- Website: bunge.com

Bunge Global SA (BUN-ghee) is a global agribusiness and food company, incorporated in Geneva, Switzerland, and headquartered in St. Louis, Missouri, United States.

As well as being an international soybean exporter, it is also involved in food processing, grain trading, and fertilizer. It competes with Archer Daniels Midland, Cargill and Louis Dreyfus. The company has approximately 23,000 employees in 40 countries.

== History ==
=== Formation and listing ===
Bunge was founded in 1818 by Johann Peter Gottlieb Bunge in Amsterdam, it was relocated to Antwerp by Edouard Bunge in 1859. Edouard's brother; Ernest Bunge, took the Bunge name to Argentina in 1884, and in 1905 the business extended to Brazil and later on to the United States. In 1994, the company was converted into the Bermuda-registered Bunge International, retaining the Bunge y Born name only in Argentina. Bunge remained a privately held company of 180 shareholders (including the longtime controlling family interests) and divested itself in 1998 of almost all its retail foods interests in favor of a greater role in international agribusiness and commodity markets; by then the company's gross annual turnover had reached US$13 billion. Bunge ultimately went public on the New York Stock Exchange in 2001, becoming Bunge Limited.

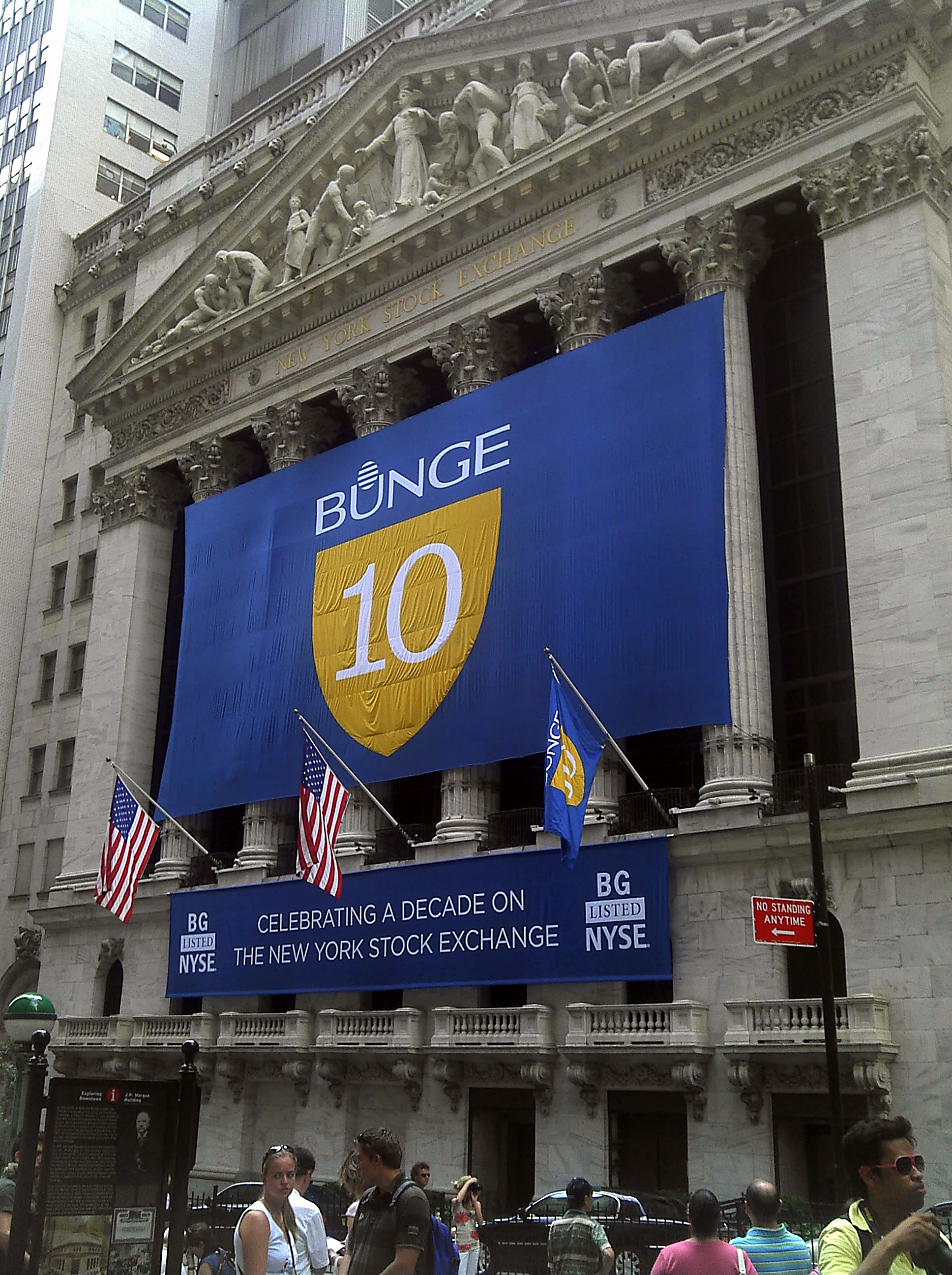
The New York Stock Exchange Building on August 4, 2011, when Bunge celebrated the 10th anniversary of its listing on the New York Stock Exchange

In 2001, under the leadership of Alberto Weisser, Bunge was listed on the New York Stock Exchange. Through their three businesses—agribusiness, fertilizer, and food products—they have established a leading global presence in the farm-to-consumer food chain. Bunge is the world's largest oilseed processor.

=== Acquisitions ===
In 2002, Bunge acquired Cereol, parent of oilseed companies Central Soya and CanAmera Foods. In 2008, Bunge acquired Walter Rau, a margarine company, from Germany. In 2009, Bunge acquired the margarine business from Raisio Group, maker of functional food ingredients. In 2017, Bunge announced intentions to acquire a 70% stake in IOI Loders Croklaan for $946 million from Malaysian palm oil producer IOI Corp Berhad.

=== Brazilian sourcing protests ===
In 2012, Bunge came under criticism from NGO Survival International for sourcing its sugarcane from the ancestral land of the Guaraní people in Brazil. It has been reported by the tribe that crop production has brought pesticides and machinery that has damaged their health, as well as restricting them to a small area that has prevented them from hunting and practicing their traditions. Also, in January 2003, opposition from the tribe had led to the killing of their chief Marcus Vernon by ranchers. In 2012, survivors were requesting Bunge follows the example of the company Raízen, which agreed to stop the sourcing of sugarcane from the area.

=== Recent ===
In May 2017, Glencore in Switzerland began pursuing the acquisition of Bunge. In early June 2017, Bunge hired advisers to help it fend off Glencore's takeover interest. In January 2017, Archer Daniels Midland agreed to sell its crop risk services (insurance) unit to Validus Holdings for $127.5 million. On January 19, 2018, it was reported that Archer Daniels Midland had approached Bunge Ltd. about a takeover, with details "unclear." At that point, Bunge had a market value of about $9.8 billion, and was still being pursued by Glencore.

In 2019, Bunge relocated its global headquarters from White Plains, New York, to the St Louis metropolitan area in 2020, where the company had its US headquarters.

In April 2020, Bunge announced it agreed to sell 35 U.S interior grain elevators to Zen-Noh Corporation. The completion of the sale was subject to regulatory approval and closed in December 2021.

In 2021, Bunge was ranked 18th on FoodTalks' Global Top 40 Plant Protein Producers list.

A 2023, Bloomberg Businessweek described Bunge's food science pivot.

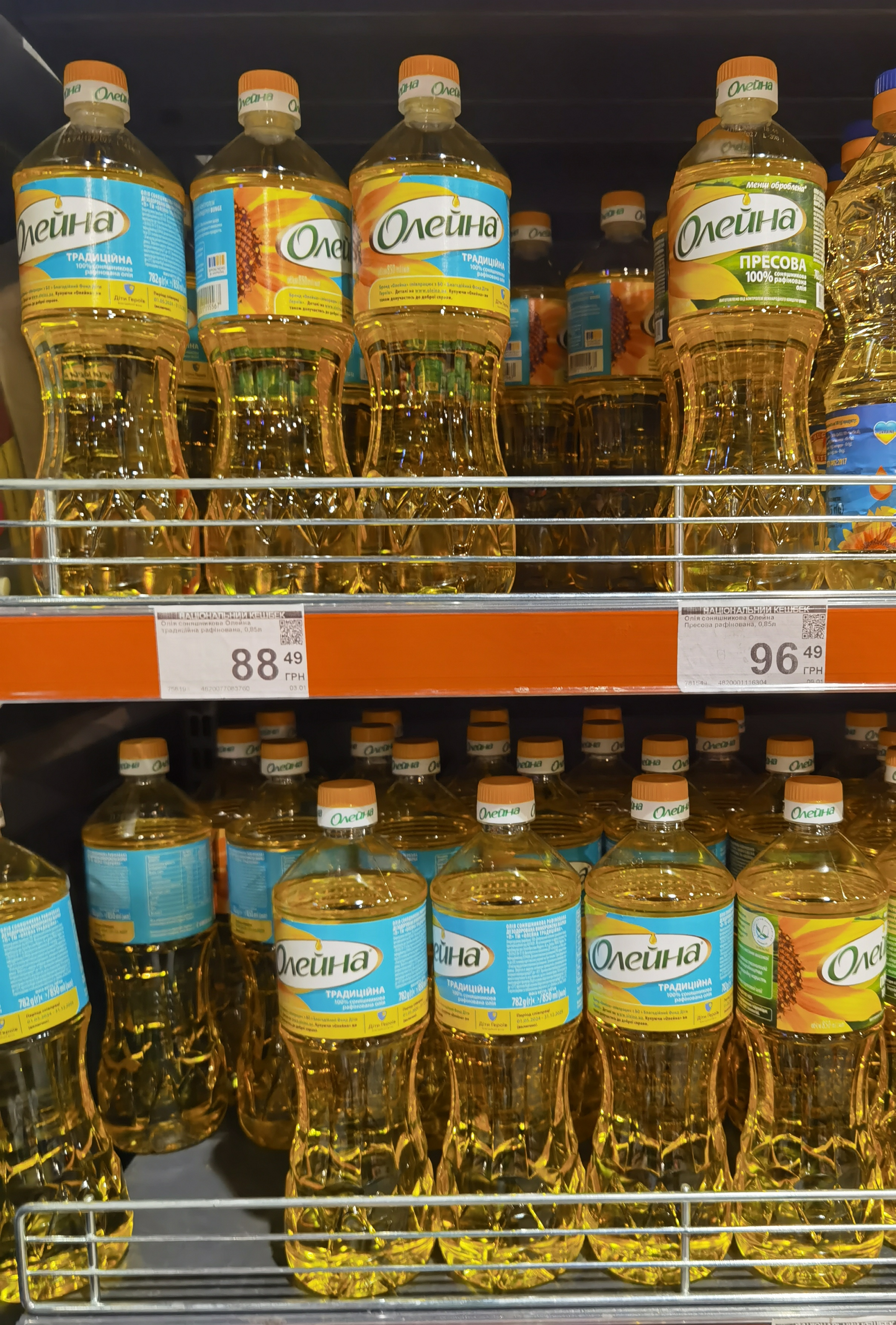
Sunflower oil produced by Bunge Ukraine.

In 2023, a merger with Viterra was announced. In July 2025, the merger with Viterra was completed.

On 5 January 2026 a Bunge sunflower oil production plant in Dnipro, Ukraine, was hit in a Russian drone attack. Resulting in 300 tonnes of oil spilled onto roads. Ukrainian Foreign Minister Andrii Sybiha claimed on 6 January 2026 that the attack was not accidental and he assessed that Russia was systematically attacking American businesses in Ukraine.

== Products ==
The company's operations include:

- originating oilseeds and grains from the world's primary growing regions and transporting them to customers worldwide;
- crushing oilseeds to make meal for the livestock industry and oil for the food processing, food service and biofuel industries;
- producing bottled oils, mayonnaise, margarines and other food products for consumers;
- crushing sugarcane to make sugar, ethanol and electricity;
- milling wheat and corn for food processors, bakeries, brewers and other commercial customers; and
- selling fertilizer to farmers.

== Environmental record ==
In 2006, the United States Environmental Protection Agency filed charges against Bunge company regarding pollution emissions. This involved twelve soybean processing plants and corn mills in eight states throughout the US. The lawsuit claimed Bunge violated the Clean Air Act by constructing major modifications that increased emissions. Bunge was required to implement engineering changes and pollution control projects, estimated to cost $12 million, to reduce emissions at the facilities by 2,200 tons a year. The settlement also called for Bunge to pay a cash penalty of $625,000 and to spend $1.25 million to fund community-based environmental projects selected by and to be supervised by the impacted states.

== Biofuel production ==
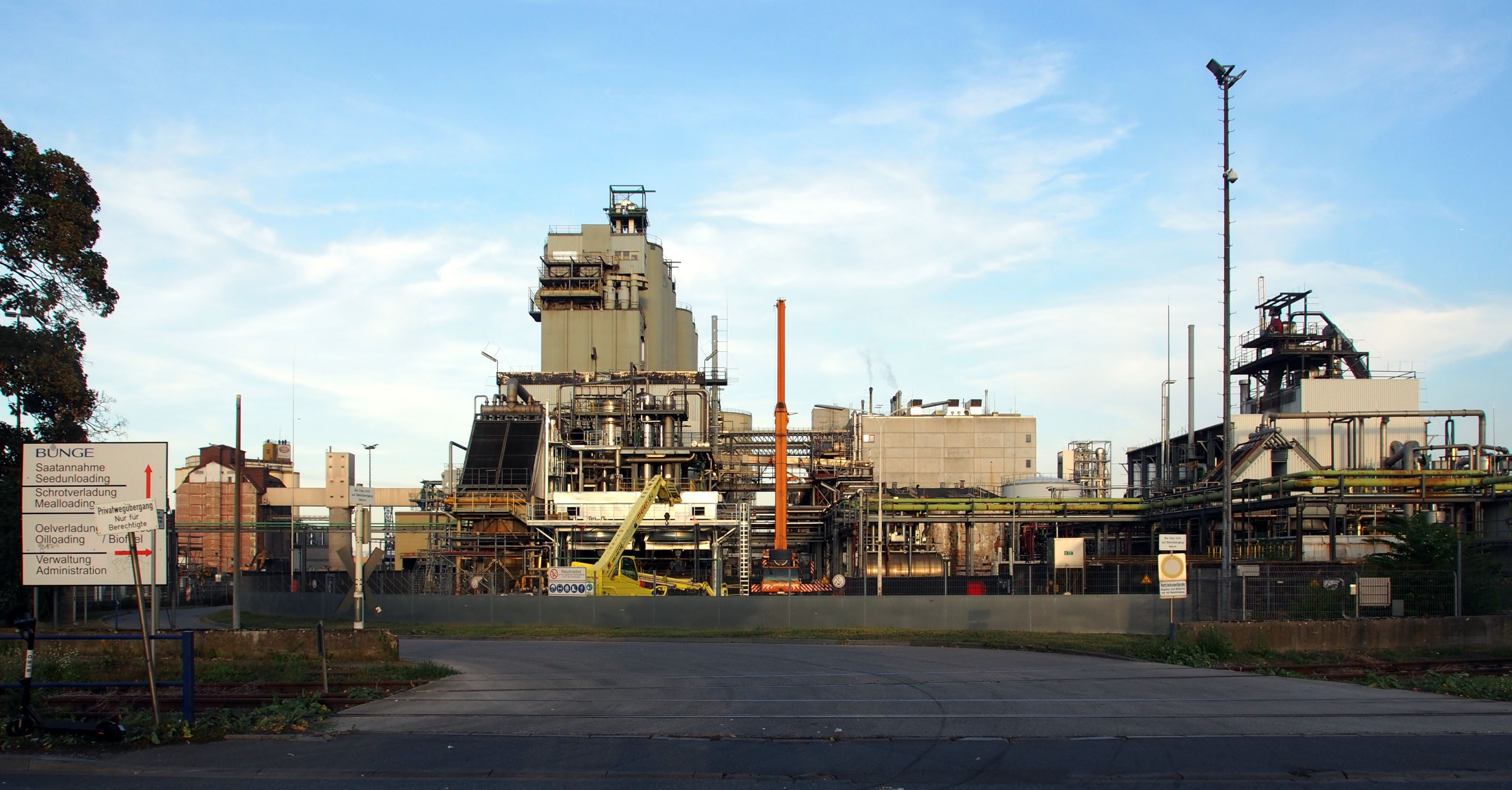
Biodiesel plant in Mannheim Harbour

In November 2005, Bunge created a Europe production joint venture biodiesel with French company KBBV and Diester Industrie. The new company received the name Diester Industrie International. The joint venture will produce biodiesel in Germany, Austria and Italy. The total capacity of the plants will reach 430 thousand tons biodiesel per year.

== Corporate governance ==
As of 05 Feb 2020

- Gregory Heckman, CEO, Bunge Global SA
- Aaron Buettner, President, Bunge Loders Croklaan
- Brian Zachman, President, Global Risk Management
- Christos Dimopoulos, President, Global Supply Chains
- Raul Padilla, President, Global Agri Operations, (Retiring effective December 31, 2021)
- Deborah Borg, EVP & Chief HR and Communications Officer
- John Neppl, EVP & CFO
- Josef Podwika, EVP & General Counsel
- Pierre Mauger, Chief Transformation Officer
- Robert Coviello, SVP Sustainably & Government Affairs
- Robert Wagner, Chief Risk Officer

== Tax dodging ==
A noteworthy case of transfer mispricing came to light in Argentina in 2011, involving the world’s four largest grain traders: ADM, Bunge, Cargill and Louis Dreyfus Company. Argentina’s revenue and customs service began an investigation into the four companies when prices for agricultural commodities spiked in 2008 and yet very little profit for the four companies had been reported to the office. As a result of the investigation, it was alleged that the companies had submitted false declarations of sales and routed profits through tax havens or through their headquarters. In some cases, they were said to have used phantom firms to buy grain and had inflated costs in Argentina in order to reduce the recorded profits earned in the country. According to the country’s revenue and customs service, the outstanding taxes amounted to almost USD 1 billion.

The companies involved denied the allegations and, by 2019, the Argentinian tax authorities had not replied to the request of Swiss NGO Public Eye regarding the current state of the case. In its 2018 annual report to the US Securities and Exchange Commission (SEC), Bunge mentioned provisions which suggested that the case is still ongoing: “[A]s of December 31, 2018, Bunge’s Argentine subsidiary had received income tax assessments relating to 2006 through 2009 of approximately 1,276 million Argentine pesos (approximately $34 million), plus applicable interest on the outstanding amount of approximately 4,246 million Argentine pesos (approximately $113 million^{]}).”

== See also ==
- Companies listed on the New York Stock Exchange (B)
