= Jay Tuck =

American actor

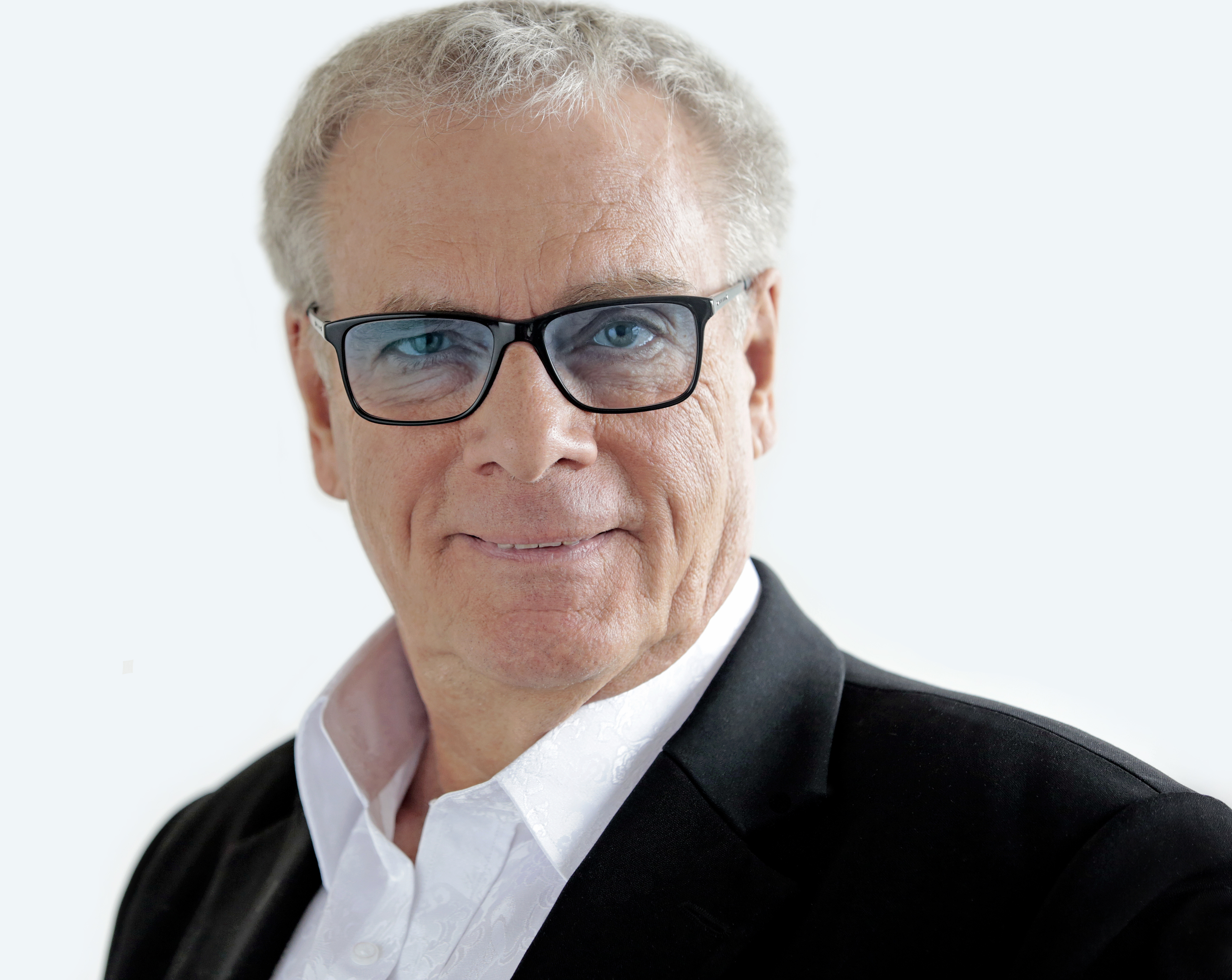
Jay Tuck

Jay Nelson Tuck, Jr. (born April 25, 1945) is an American journalist, television producer, author, voice talent and lecturer.

During his 35-year-employment with ARD German Television, Tuck worked as investigative reporter, war correspondent in Iraq and Executive Producer of the daily network news magazine ARD-Tagesthemen.

== Early life ==
Jay Nelson Tuck, Jr. was born in Brooklyn, New York as son of newspaper journalist Jay Nelson Tuck. He attended Wayne High School in New Jersey and studied at Antioch College in Yellow Springs, Ohio. There he shot his first student films, The Date and Short Circuit. During his studies he also held jobs as a student economist at the Federal Trade Commission, the US Treasury and as a social worker in Harlem. Tuck began his journalistic career at age twenty as radio reporter for WYSO, the college's FM station.

== Civilian service in Europe ==
As a recognized conscientious objector during the Vietnam War he travelled to Germany, where he served his two-year civilian service in Hamburg. During this time, Tuck shot various amateur films, including Good Day with the British rock group Nektar.

== ARD German Television ==
His German media career began in 1971 as a free-lancer for local TV at Norddeutscher Rundfunk (NDR) in Hamburg, where he interviewed many entertainment personalities, including Joan Baez, Johnny Cash, Mick Jagger, Leonard Cohen and Andy Warhol. For thirty years, Jay Tuck was employed full-time by NDR and the ARD network, first as investigative reporter for NDR-Panorama and WDR-Monitor, later as war correspondent in both Gulf Wars.

== Free-lance journalist ==
In Germany, reportage from Jay Tuck appeared in Stern, Der Spiegel, Die Welt, Zeit-Dossier and Zeit-Magazin. Internationally he has written for Oggi (Italy), Panorama and Nieuwe Revu (Netherlands), Vi Menn (Norway), Le Point (France), Playboy (Germany) and Time Magazine (USA).

== Author ==
=== Books ===
- High-Tech Espionage, St. Martins Press, New York, ISBN 9780708832714
- The T Directorat, St. Martin's Press, New York, ISBN 9780312908355
- High-Tech Espionage, Sidgwick & Jackson, London ISBN 9780283992926
- Die Computer-Spione, Heyne Verlag, Munich, ISBN 3453020081
- La Guerre des Ordinateurs, Plon, Paris 2002, ISBN 9782259014212
- Il gioco della conchiglia (Computer Connection), Adnkronos libri, Rome 1985
- Ο πόλεμος των computers - Οι Πειρατές της Πληροφορικής (War of computers - Pirates of Information), Roes Publishing, Athens, 1986
- Direktorat T, Kriminalistik-Verlag, Köln 2002, ISBN 9783783213874

== Airtime Dubai and Al-Jazeera ==
After retiring from ARD German Television, Jay Tuck founded Airtime Dubai Ltd in the United Arab Emirates, an international media company with close contacts to the Arab broadcasters of the region. His weekly technology magazine Understanding Tomorrow (عن كثب) was on-air for five years and watched by 40 million viewers on Al-Jazeera (Arabic). Airtime Dubai also produces corporate image videos. Its music arm, Airtime Records, released the top-selling CD "Dubai Nights, Volume One".

== Voice work ==
Tuck has continued his work behind the microphone since his university days, as radio DJ on the north German FM station NDR-2 ("Die Jay Tuck Show") and in commercials and cinema trailers. His voice can be heard on hundreds of TV commercials, and as the narrator of the Hollywood thriller Alone in the Dark starring Christian Slater.

== Recreation ==
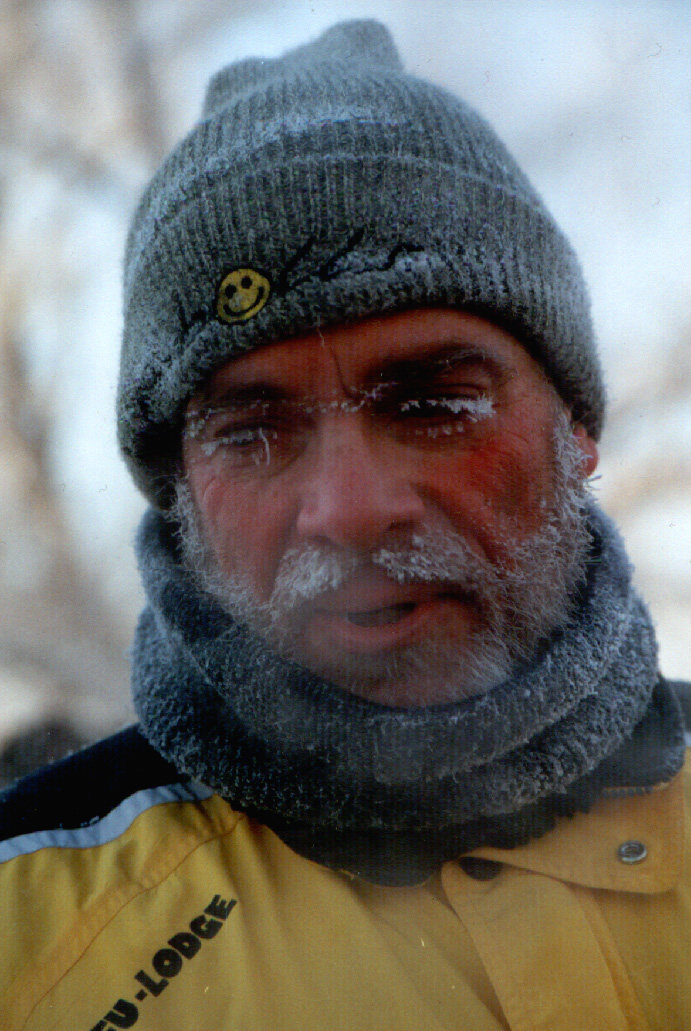
Jay Tuck during the Siberian Ice Marathon in Omsk, Russia, 2001

Tuck is a long-distance runner. In the year 2000 he became the first American to run the Siberian Ice Marathon in Omsk, Russia.
