= Charles Marshall (American soldier) =

American soldier

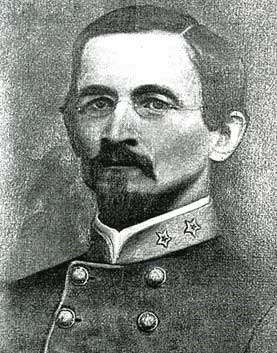
- Born: October 3, 1830; Warrenton, Virginia
- Died: April 19, 1902 (aged 71); Baltimore, Maryland
- Burial place: Green Mount Cemetery; Baltimore, Maryland
- Children: Hudson Snowden Marshall
- Relatives: Col. Timothy Andrews (father-in-law); Col. Richard Snowden Andrews (brother-in-law)
- Military career
- Allegiance: Confederate States of America
- Branch: Confederate States Army
- Service years: 1861–1865
- Rank: Colonel
- Commands: Military Secretary, Assistant Adjutant General Army of Northern Virginia
- Conflicts: American Civil War
- Other work: Lawyer; Professor

Charles Marshall (October 3, 1830 – April 19, 1902) was a Confederate military officer during the American Civil War. Marshall served as an aide de camp, assistant adjutant general and military secretary to Gen. Robert E. Lee, and later worked to establish the Lost Cause and monuments to his former comrades.

== Early and family life ==
Marshall was born on October 3, 1830, in Warrenton, Virginia, to Alexander John Marshall (1803–1882) and his first wife, the former Maria Rose Taylor (1808–1844). A distant relative of Chief Justice John Marshall, Charles Marshall was also a cousin of World War II General George C. Marshall. His sister Catherine Taylor Marshall (1832–1866) would marry Fendall Dade Marbury of Prince George's County, Maryland. He received a private education at the Richard M. Smith School and the Warren Green Academy (both in Warrenton) before entering the University of Virginia in Charlottesville. He graduated with a Master's Degree with high honors in 1848.

In December 1856, Charles Marshall married Emily Andrews, daughter of Mexican War hero Colonel Timothy Patrick Andrews and sister of Richard Snowden Andrews. Marshall and his wife had one daughter. Emily Andrews Marshall, who died in 1858. Marshall remarried in December 1866, to Sara Rebecca Nicholls Snowden, daughter of Col. Thomas Snowden. They had five sons, including Attorney Hudson Snowden Marshall, and daughter Emily Rosalie Snowden (wife of Judge Somerville Pinkney Tuck).

== Early career ==
He taught mathematics as a professor at Indiana University from 1850 to 1852. Returning to Virginia, Marshall read law. In 1853, he moved to Baltimore, Maryland, where he was admitted to the bar and began practice at the law firm of William Schley. In 1860, he and his wife were living with his Irish-born father-in-law and architect brother-in-law and his family in a large household which employed six white domestic servants but no slaves.

== Civil War ==
Lee, a long-time family friend, appointed Marshall to his personal staff on March 21, 1862, with the rank of captain. Marshall served as Lee's aide-de-camp and was present with Lee during all the major battles of the Army of Northern Virginia. He was subsequently promoted to major, lieutenant colonel and colonel. He was responsible for the writing of Lee's after-action reports during the War. Marshall accompanied Lee at the surrender at the Battle of Appomattox Courthouse and drafted Lee's acceptance of the terms of surrender. He also located the Wilmer McLean house where the surrender meeting took place and drafted Lee's "Farewell Order" to the Army of Northern Virginia.

== Postbellum activities ==
Following the War, Marshall returned to Baltimore and continued his legal practice, becoming one of Baltimore's leading attorneys. Marshall delivered the dedication addresses for the monument to Lee in Richmond, Virginia, and the monument to Ulysses S. Grant in New York City.

== Death and legacy ==
Marshall died at his home in Baltimore, Maryland, in 1902 from a stroke ("apoplexy"), and was buried in the city's Green Mount Cemetery. His papers were later published in a book called Lee's Aide-de-Camp, edited by Sir Frederick Maurice and in a later edition by Gary W. Gallagher.

Henry B. Walthall played Marshall in the 1930 film, Abraham Lincoln, directed by D.W. Griffith. Tim Ruddy portrayed Marshall in the film Gettysburg and John D. Bert held the role in the related film Gods and Generals. Marshall is a supporting character in the 1992 science fiction-alternate history novel The Guns of the South by Harry Turtledove.

Harris Katleman played Marshall in The Rebel, episode "Johnny Yuma at Appomattox".
