= Brigadier General Thomas F. Barr Award =

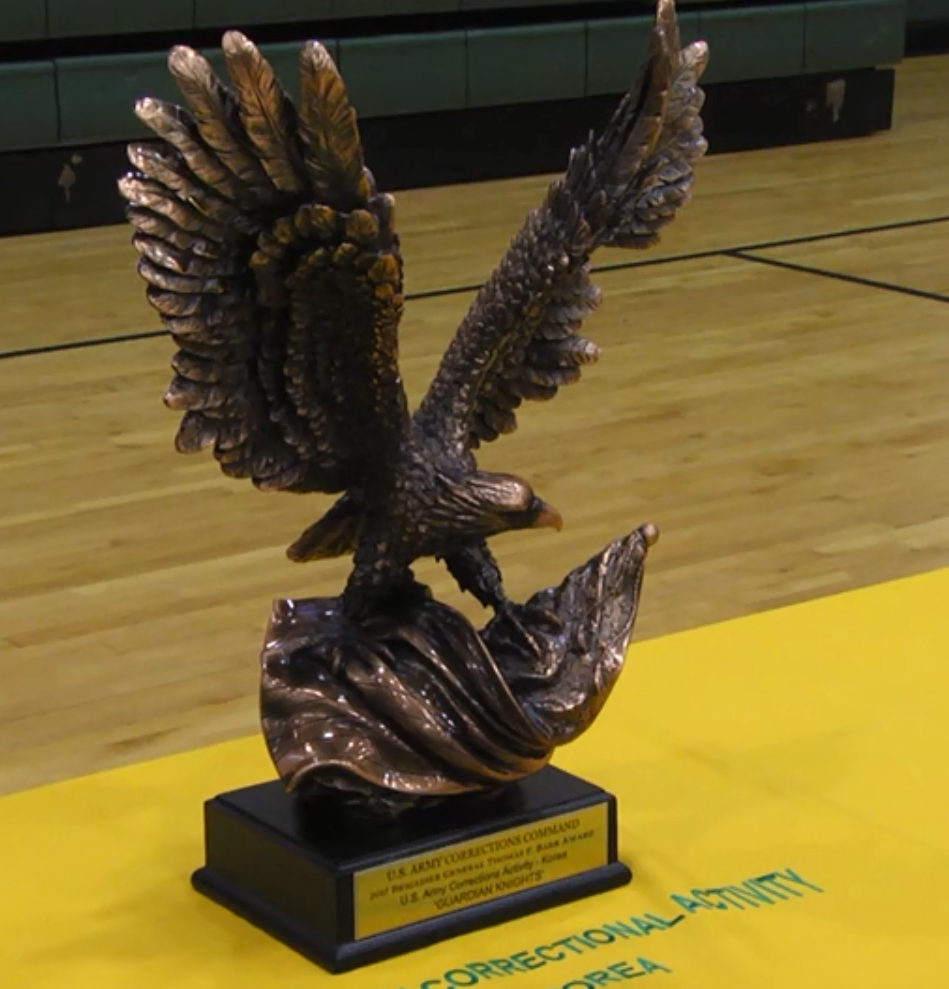
- 2017 Brigadier General Thomas F. Barr Award trophy
- Type: Unit trophy
- Description: A bronze bald eagle, wings displayed, perched on the United States flag and set upon a black pedestal
- Country: United States
- Presented by: United States Army
- Status: Currently awarded
- First award: 2009

Highlights
- Total: 10
- Related: Jeremiah P. Holland Award; David H. Stem Award; Eagle Award

The Brigadier General Thomas F. Barr Award is a unit trophy annually awarded by the United States Army to a military police unit working with the United States Army Corrections Command. It was first awarded in 2009.

== History ==
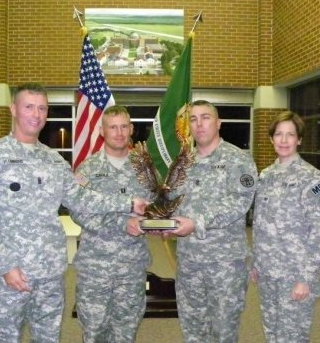
Military Police officers and NCOs pose with the Barr Award in 2009

The Brigadier General Thomas F. Barr Award, first issued in 2009, is annually awarded to the all-around best Military Police unit of company-size or smaller "attached to, or supporting" the United States Army Corrections Command. According to the U.S. Army, the "award is intended to promote professionalism and esprit de corps by recognizing the unit that displays the most outstanding performance over a 12-month period".

The award is considered a unit trophy as provided for in Army Regulation 600–8–22. Units are scored against several specific criteria including the unit's Army Physical Fitness Test and weapons qualification averages, educational attainment levels of its personnel, community involvement, and unit and individual soldier accomplishments such as deployments and commendations. It is considered "very competitive".

=== Namesake ===
The Brigadier General Thomas F. Barr Award is named after Thomas Francis Barr (1837–1916) who served in the Judge Advocate General Corps from 1865 to 1901. Barr was, for 21 years, a commissioner of the United States Disciplinary Barracks at Fort Leavenworth, Kansas, and was also the personal adviser to United States Secretary of War Robert Todd Lincoln. On May 21, 1901, Barr was promoted to brigadier general and named Judge Advocate General of the United States. He retired the following day. Barr was the father-in-law of Colonel Francis Tompkins, the great-great-nephew of Vice President of the United States Daniel D. Tompkins.

== Recipients ==
Year	Unit	Reference
2009	526th Military Police Company	
2010	Headquarters and Headquarters Company, 705th Military Police Battalion	
2011	256th Military Police Company	
2012	Headquarters and Headquarters Company, 40th Military Police Battalion	
2013	595th Military Police Company	
2014	291st Military Police Company	
2015	526th Military Police Company	
2016	U.S. Army Correctional Activity-Korea	
2017	256th Military Police Company	
2018	291st Military Police Company	
2019	165th Military Police Company	
2020	Headquarters and Headquarters Company, Joint Regional Correctional Facility	
2021	Headquarters and Headquarters Company, 40th Military Police Battalion	

== See also ==
- Awards and decorations of the United States Armed Forces
- United States Army Provost Marshal General
