= Brigadier General Jeremiah P. Holland Award =

Unit trophy for U.S. Army military police

- Type: Unit trophy
- Country: United States
- Presented by: United States Army
- Status: Currently awarded
- Established: 1969
- First award: 1970
- Related: Thomas F. Barr Award; David H. Stem Awardwl; Eagle Award

The Brigadier General Jeremiah P. Holland Award is a unit trophy annually awarded by the United States Army to a Military Police unit. It was established in 1969 and first awarded in 1970.

== History ==
The Brigadier General Jeremiah P. Holland Award, first issued on 26 September 1970 – the 29th anniversary of the Military Police Corps – is annually awarded to the all-around best Military Police unit of company-size or smaller in the U.S. Army. The award is considered a unit trophy as provided for in Army Regulation 600–8–22. Units are scored against several specific criteria including the unit's Army Physical Fitness Test and weapons qualification averages, unit deployments, and personnel re-enlistment totals.

The award was established with a financial endowment from its namesake, Jeremiah Holland, following his retirement from military service. The award criteria and procedures were subsequently created by Major General Karl W. Gustafson, then the Provost Marshal General of the United States. Under them, each Army Command, Army Service Component Command, Direct Reporting unit or Field Operating Agency – as well as the U.S. Army Reserve and the Army National Guard – is allowed to submit two nominations. By custom, the recipients of inferior Military Police unit trophies – including the Eagle Award (awarded to the best MP unit in Forces Command), the Thomas F. Barr Award (awarded to the best MP unit in Army Corrections Command), and others – are nominated for consideration for the Holland Award. It consists of a trophy awarded to the selected unit, and challenge coins to the unit's personnel.

In 2019, the award was redesignated as the MG Harry H. Bandholtz Award after Harry Hill Bandholtz.

== Winners ==
- 2018 551st MP Company, Fort Campbell, Kentucky
- 2016 U.S. Army Correctional Activity-Korea (Note: Two awards in the spring of 2017, one in March, the other one in April—were there two awards for 2016?)
- 2016 65th Military Police Company (Airborne), Fort Bragg, North Carolina
- 2015 21st MP Company (ABN), Fort Bragg, North Carolina
- 2014 HHD, 11th MP Battalion (CID), Fort Hood, Texas
- 2013 92D MP Company, Baumholder, Germany
- 2012 58TH MP Company, Schofield Barracks, Hawaii
- 2011 209TH MP Detachment, Fort Benning, Georgia
- 2010 HHC, 705TH MP Battalion, Fort Leavenworth, Kansas
- 2009 194TH MP Company, Fort Campbell, Kentucky
- 2008 59TH MP Company, Fort Carson, Colorado
- 2007 108TH MP Company, Fort Bragg, North Carolina
- 2006 194TH MP Company, Fort Campbell, Kentucky
- 2005 551ST MP Company, Fort Campbell, Kentucky
- 2004 82D MP Company, Fort Bragg, North Carolina
- 2003 615TH MP Company, Grafenwoehr, Germany
- 2002 549TH MP Company, Fort Stewart, Georgia
- 2001 552D MP Company, Pusan, Korea
- 2000 92D MP Company, Baumholder, Germany
- 1999 230TH MP Company, Kaiserslautern, Germany
- 1998 21ST MP Company, Fort Bragg, North Carolina
- 1997 1ST MP Company, Wurzburg, Germany
- 1996 230TH MP Company, Kaiserslautern, Germany
- 1995 Fort Myer MP Company, Fort Myer, Virginia
- 1994 3D MP Company, Wurzburg, Germany
- 1993 300TH MP Company, Fort Leonard Wood, Missouri
- 1992 188TH MP Company, Camp Walker, Korea
- 1991 501ST MP Company, Bad Kreuznach, Germany
- 1990 65TH MP Company, Fort Bragg, North Carolina
- 1989 556TH MP Company, Sieglesbach, Germany
- 1988 549TH MP Company, Fort Davis, Panama
- 1987 287th MP Company (separate), Berlin, Germany
- 1986 552D MP Company, Pusan, Korea
- 1985 287th MP Company (separate), Berlin, Germany
- 1984 118TH MP Company, Fort Bragg, North Carolina
- 1983 300TH MP Company, Stuttgart, Germany
- 1982 6TH MP Company, Muenster, Germany
- 1981 534TH MP Company, Fort Clayton, Panama
- 1980 2D MP Company, Camp Casey, Korea
- 1979 561st MP Company, Fort Myer, Virginia
- 1978 984TH MP Company, Fort Carson, Colorado
- 1977 284TH MP Company, Frankfurt, Germany
- 1976 287th MP Company (separate), Berlin, Germany
- 1975 82D MP Company, Fort Bragg, North Carolina
- 1974 529TH MP Company, Heidelberg, Germany
- 1973 20TH MP Company, Okinawa, Japan
- 1972 570TH MP Company, Frankfurt, Germany
- 1971 118TH MP Company, Fort Bragg, North Carolina
- 1970 545TH MP Company, Fort Hood, Texas

=== Namesake ===
Jeremiah P. Holland is considered one of the "founding fathers" of the Military Police Corps, having entered it during the year of its establishment, in 1941. During World War II, Holland served as provost marshal of Manila, Philippines and as the U.S. Army's deputy provost marshal in Australia. He would go on to serve as deputy to the Provost Marshal General of the United States before his retirement in 1969 at the rank of brigadier general.
