= Kevin Vereen =

United States Army general

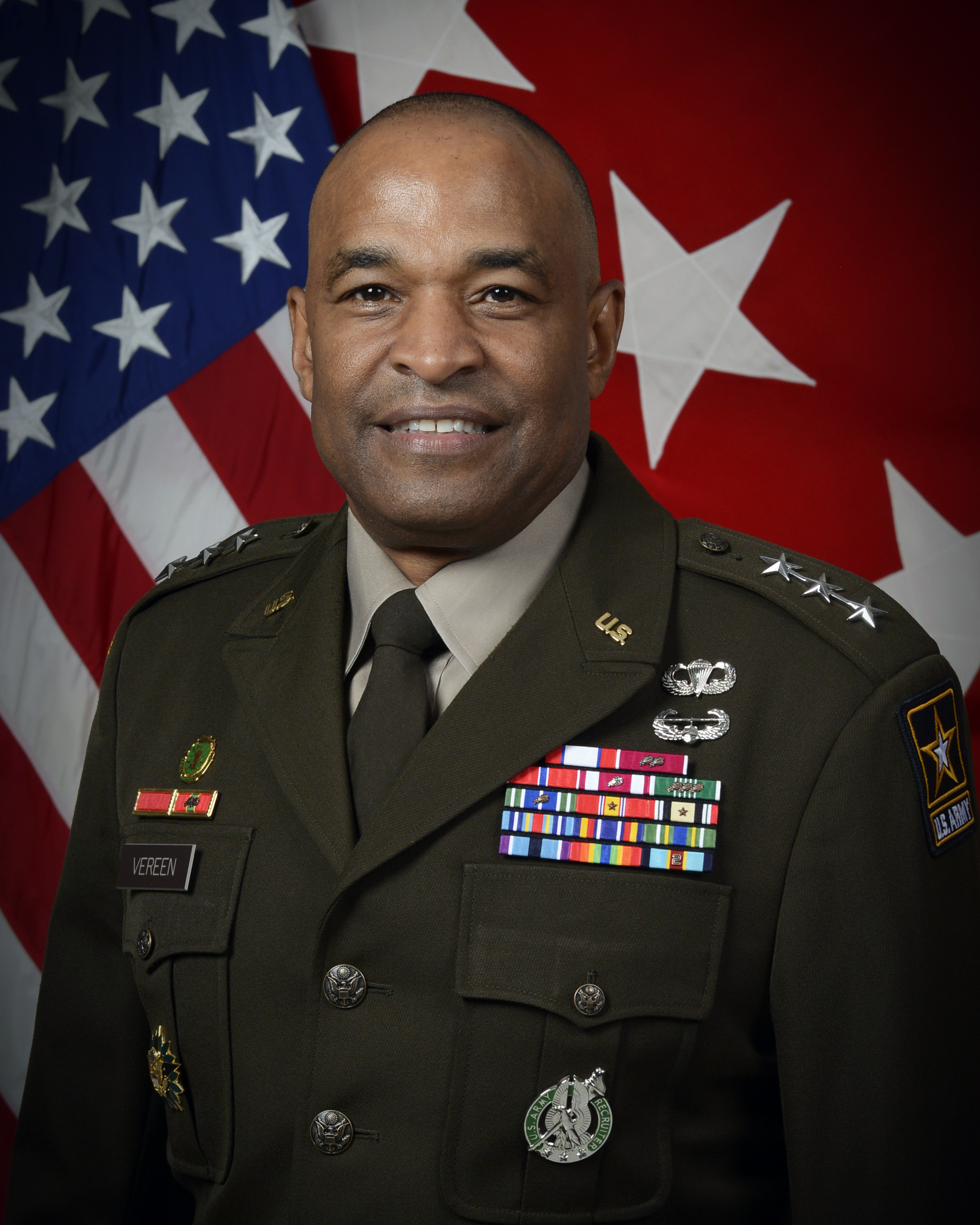
- Official portrait, 2022
- Born: Fort Bragg, North Carolina, U.S.
- Education: Campbell University; United States Army Command and General Staff College
- Military career
- Allegiance: United States
- Branch: United States Army
- Service years: 1988–2024
- Rank: Lieutenant General
- Commands: United States Army Recruiting Command; United States Army Criminal Investigation Command; United States Army Corrections Command; 14th Military Police Brigade; 701st Military Police Battalion
- Conflicts: Iraq War
- Awards: Army Distinguished Service Medal; Legion of Merit (4); Bronze Star Medal

Kevin Vereen is a retired United States Army lieutenant general who last served as the deputy chief of staff for installations of the U.S. Army from 2022 to 2024. He previously served as commanding general of the United States Army Recruiting Command from 2020 to 2022. As the army's chief recruiter, Vereen was the principal military advisor to the Commanding General, United States Army Training and Doctrine Command on all matters pertaining to the scouting, recruiting, medical and psychological examination, induction, and processing of potential service personnel. He served as the United States Army Provost Marshal General from 2019 to 2020 and as deputy commanding general (operations) of the Army Recruiting Command from 2017 to 2019.

== Military career ==
In May 2022, Vereen was nominated for promotion to lieutenant general and assignment as the deputy chief of staff for installations of the United States Army.

Military offices
Preceded by Mark S. Splinder	Commandant of the United States Army Military Police School and Chief of Military Police Corps; 2015–2017	Succeeded by Donna W. Martin
Preceded by Donna W. Martin	Deputy Commanding General of the United States Army Recruiting Command; 2017–2019	Succeeded by Patrick R. Michaelis
Preceded by David P. Glaser	United States Army Provost Marshal General; 2019–2020	Succeeded by Donna W. Martin
Preceded by Frank M. Muth	Commanding General of the United States Army Recruiting Command; 2020–2022	Succeeded by Johnny K. Davis
Preceded by Jason T. Evans	Deputy Chief of Staff for Installations of the United States Army; 2022–2024	Succeeded by Daniel M. Klippstein; Acting
