= Jason T. Evans =

U.S. Army general

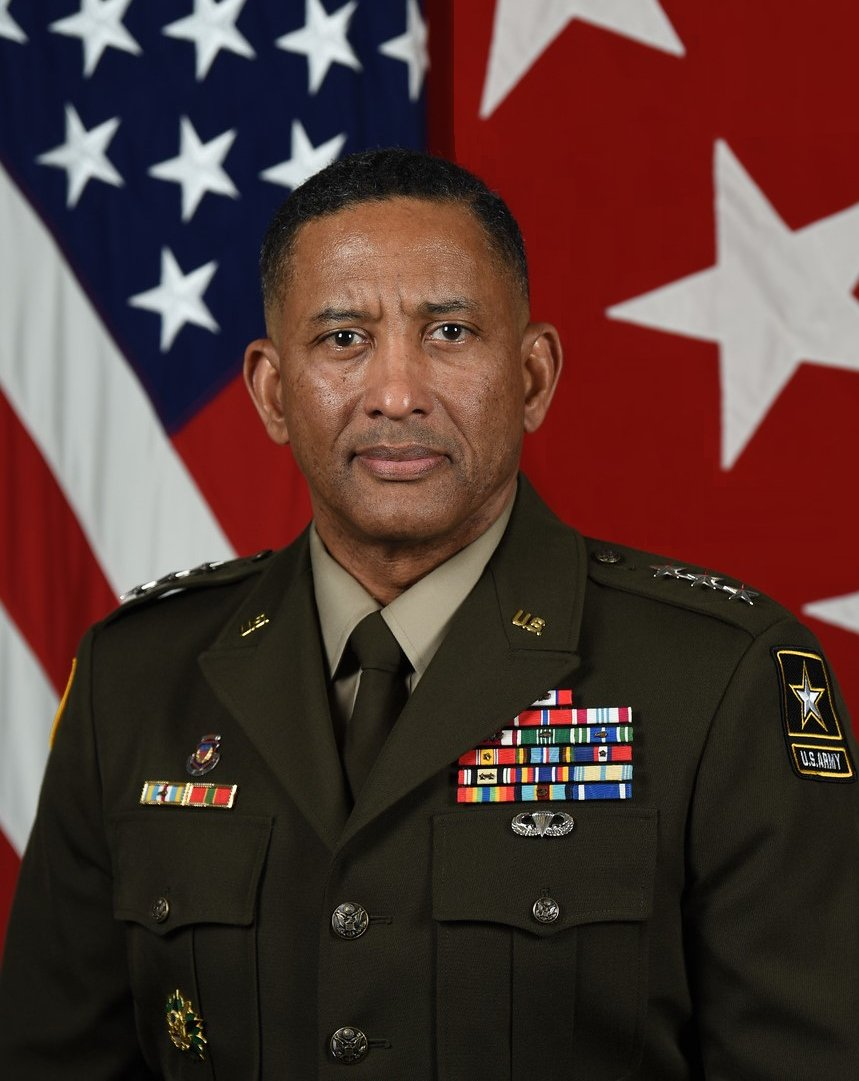
- Education: Wentworth Military Academy (ADBA); Bellevue University (BBA); Webster University (MBA); National Defense University (MNRS)
- Military career
- Allegiance: United States
- Branch: United States Army
- Service years: 1981–2022
- Rank: Lieutenant General
- Commands: United States Army Human Resources Command; 510th Personnel Services Battalion
- Conflicts: Iraq War
- Awards: Army Distinguished Service Medal (3); Legion of Merit (3); Bronze Star Medal

Jason T. Evans is a retired United States Army lieutenant general who last served as the deputy chief of staff for installations (G-9) of the United States Army. Previously, he was the commanding general of the United States Army Human Resources Command.

Military offices
| Preceded by ??? | Deputy Commanding General for Support of the United States Army Installation Management Command; 2013–2015 | Succeeded by Daniel G. Mitchell |
| Preceded by Thomas C. Seamands | Director of Military Personnel Management of the United States Army; 2015–2017 | Succeeded by Joseph R. Calloway |
| Preceded by Thomas C. Seamands | Commanding General of the United States Army Human Resources Command; 2017–2019 | Succeeded by Joseph R. Calloway |
| Preceded by Gwen Bingham as Assistant Chief of Staff for Installation Management | Deputy Chief of Staff for Installations of the United States Army; 2019–2022 | Succeeded by Kevin Vereen |
