= William O. Wooldridge =

United States Army soldier and the first Sergeant Major of the Army

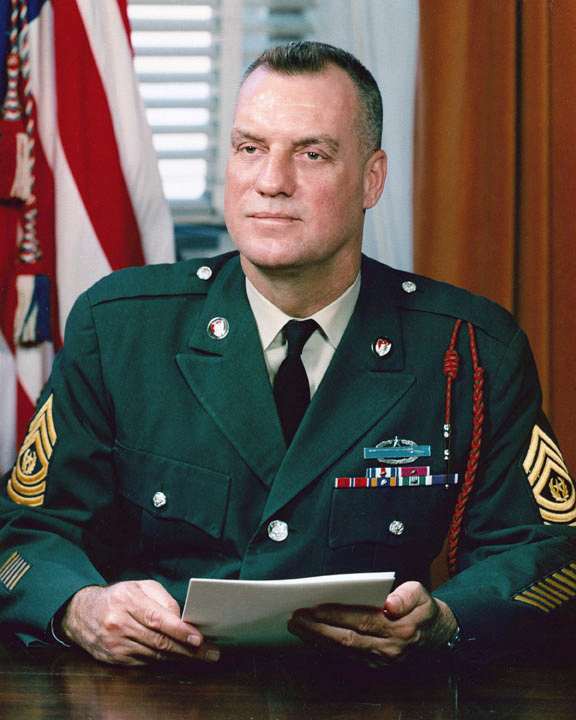
- Sergeant Major of the Army William O. Wooldridge
- Born: August 12, 1922; Shawnee, Oklahoma, U.S.
- Died: March 5, 2012 (aged 89); El Paso, Texas, U.S.
- Burial place: Fort Bliss National Cemetery
- Military career
- Allegiance: United States
- Branch: United States Army
- Service years: 1940–1972
- Rank: Sergeant Major of the Army
- Conflicts: World War II; Vietnam War
- Awards: Silver Star (2); Legion of Merit (2); Bronze Star Medal; Air Medal (6); Army Commendation Medal (2); Purple Heart; Croix de guerre (Belgium)

William O. Wooldridge (August 12, 1922 – March 5, 2012) was a United States Army soldier and the first Sergeant Major of the Army.

Wooldridge served on active duty from 1940 to 1972. His military career spanned two wars and 14 campaigns, during which he was twice decorated for gallantry in action. He was sworn in as the first Sergeant Major of the Army on July 11, 1966.

== Early life ==
William Wooldridge was born in Shawnee, Oklahoma, and grew up in Texas. He enlisted in the United States Army at Fort Worth, Texas on November 11, 1940.

== Military career ==
Wooldridge enlisted on 13 November 1940 after returning to Texas from California. Wooldridge served first with Company F, 23rd Regiment, 2nd Infantry Division at Fort Sam Houston, Texas. Six months after arriving at Fort Sam Houston, he was promoted to corporal. In December 1941 he was assigned to detached service with the British forces in Iceland. The following year, he was released from detached service and assigned to Company K, 26th Regiment, 1st Infantry Division when it arrived in England. He served with his division throughout World War II in an infantry rifle company, being promoted through the ranks to first sergeant. Wooldridge landed on D-Day as a squad leader (sergeant).

Wooldridge was awarded the Silver Star for gallantry at the Battle of Aachen in Germany in October 1944. He also received a Purple Heart for injuries in this battle. He was awarded a second Silver Star for gallantry during the Battle of the Bulge in December 1944, while serving as a platoon sergeant.

Wooldridge returned to Fort Sam Houston, Texas in May 1945. In October he was assigned to the Pacific Theater. After attending the "First Three Graders Course," Oahu Officer Troop and Staff School, at Schofield Barracks, Hawaii, he was assigned to Headquarters, Eighth United States Army, South Korea as a member of the occupation forces. In July 1948 Wooldridge was assigned as a platoon sergeant in the 26th Infantry Regiment, 1st Infantry Division, at Bamberg, Germany. He was promoted to first sergeant in Company K, 26th Infantry, 1st Infantry Division, in 1950.

In May 1954, Wooldridge returned to the United States as first sergeant of Company G, 3rd Infantry, at Fort McNair in Washington, D.C. While at Fort McNair, he was picked to testify before Congress about army enlisted pay. He rejoined the 1st Infantry Division as first sergeant of Company D, 26th Infantry at Fort Riley, Kansas in December 1955. On December 20, 1956, he was appointed sergeant major of the 3rd Battalion, 26th Regiment. In 1958 he was in one of the first groups of soldiers to be promoted to new grade of E-8. He left Fort Riley as a newly promoted sergeant major (the new grade of E-9) of the 2nd Battle Group, 28th Infantry Regiment, for duty in West Germany in December 1958, and became the 24th Infantry Division's sergeant major in March 1963. While he was the 24th ID's sergeant major, he wrote the guidelines and expectations for the duties of each unit level's sergeant major which were endorsed by his commander Major Gen. William A. Cunningham.

Wooldridge returned to the 1st Infantry Division at Fort Riley as sergeant major of the 1st Brigade in February 1965. In June 1965 he was selected by the division commander, Major General Jonathan O. Seaman, as the division sergeant major. The next month he deployed with the division's advance party to South Vietnam. He served as division sergeant major until his selection as the first Sergeant Major of the Army in July 1966.

=== Sergeant Major of the Army ===
Wooldridge was chosen for the important new position of Sergeant Major of the Army from thousands of candidates. He served as Sergeant Major of the Army from 11 July 1966 until September 1968. He is credited with improving the status of the non-commissioned officers by convening the first Major Command Sergeants Major Conference and recommending the Non-commissioned Officer Candidate Course, the Sergeants Major Academy, the Command Sergeant Major program, and a standardized non-commissioned officer promotion process. Wooldridge and General Harold K. Johnson, the Chief of Staff of the United States Army, worked together as an effective professional team. He came to revere Johnson, calling him "the finest officer I ever served with in my life".

His first priority was to develop a system to gather ideas and recommendations. He started the Major Command Sergeants Major Conference. He also wanted to reform the enlisted insignia system and assist soldiers and their families with their personal and family problems. He changed the position of company clerk from E-4 to E-5 to give commanders a more experienced NCO. He was also able to help reform the promotions of E-8 and E-9 (two highest levels of enlisted soldiers) so that their promotions would be selected at the Department of the Army level. Additionally, he helped to create an army-wide enlisted promotion system that was standardized. He felt his most significant accomplishment was the creation of the Command Sergeant Major rank.

After serving as Sergeant Major of the Army, Wooldridge returned to South Vietnam as sergeant major of the Military Assistance Command, Vietnam (MACV). He is the only Sergeant Major of the Army to return to field duty after serving in the top enlisted position.

Wooldridge's appointment was recorded in the Congressional Record of the 89th Congress Vol. 112, No. 110.

=== Controversy and PX scandal ===
In 1969, while command sergeant major of MACV, Wooldridge was accused in a congressional inquiry of fraud and corruption related to the military club system, amounting to more than $150 million annually. The inquiry found that then United States Army Provost Marshal General, Carl C. Turner had ignored Wooldridge's earlier theft and AWOL offenses that were notified to him at the time of Wooldridge's appointment as first Sergeant Major of the Army was announced in late 1966. Turner was later accused of having covered up an attempt by Wooldridge to smuggle 8-9 cases of liquor aboard General Creighton Abrams' KC-135 jet in April 1967. In late 1967 Turner ordered the United States Army Criminal Investigation Division that Wooldridge's name be removed from the list of soldiers being investigated into irregularities at the Non-commissioned officer (NCO) club at Fort Benning. Turner was also accused of having suppressed the Augsburg File which detailed the corruption of Wooldridge and other NCOs of the 24th Infantry Division in Augsburg, West Germany in the early 1960s. The subcommittee concluded that Turner had given Wooldridge and his associates immunity from investigation and "was grossly negligent in the performance of his official duties."

Wooldridge together with American businessman William J. Crum arranged to have Sergeant William Higdon appointed as custodian of the NCO club system at Long Binh Post in November 1967. Higdon testified that between then and July 1968 Crum paid him a total of approximately US$60,000 of kickbacks from the slot machine operations. In August 1968 Wooldridge brokered a deal between Crum and Maredem Inc. (a company owned by Wooldridge, Higdon and Sergeant Hatcher, the custodian of the 1st Infantry Division NCO clubs) under which Maredem would have the monopoly on snack items in the NCO clubs while Crum would have the monopoly on slot machines. Maredem wanted to take control of all operations, but it recognized that Crum was too powerful and was capable of paying larger kickbacks than Maredem.

In 1973 the Department of Justice and Wooldridge reached an agreement whereby Wooldridge pleaded guilty to accepting stock equity from Maredem.

Wooldridge had earlier been awarded the Army Distinguished Service Medal, but it was revoked following this episode. In June Collins and Robin Moore's novel Khaki Mafia, a fictional character in a criminal cartel is based on Wooldridge in South Vietnam.

== Later life ==
Wooldridge died in El Paso, Texas, on March 5, 2012, at the age of 89. He is buried at Fort Bliss National Cemetery in Section A, Lot 56.

== Awards and decorations ==
Combat Infantryman Badge, 2 awards

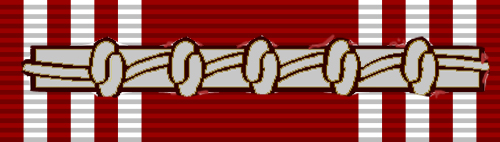
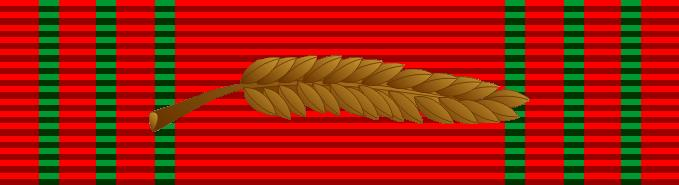
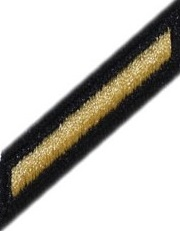
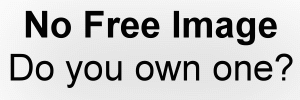
Silver Star with oak leaf cluster
Legion of Merit with oak leaf cluster
Bronze Star Medal
Air Medal with silver oak leaf cluster
Army Commendation Medal with oak leaf cluster
Purple Heart
Army Good Conduct Medal (ten awards)
American Defense Service Medal
European-African-Middle Eastern Theater Medal
Asiatic-Pacific Campaign Medal
World War II Victory Medal
Army of Occupation Medal with Germany and Japan clasps
National Defense Service Medal with oak leaf cluster
Armed Forces Expeditionary Medal
Vietnam Service Medal with two service stars
Belgian Croix de guerre with palm
Vietnam Campaign Medal
6 Overseas Service Bars
10 Service stripes
French Fourragère World War II

Military offices
New office	Sergeant Major of the Army; 1966–1968	Succeeded by George W. Dunaway
