= Allen W. Gullion =

Chaplain, Army officer, Chief of Chaplains, Chief of Chaplains of the United States Army

Allen Wyant Gullion
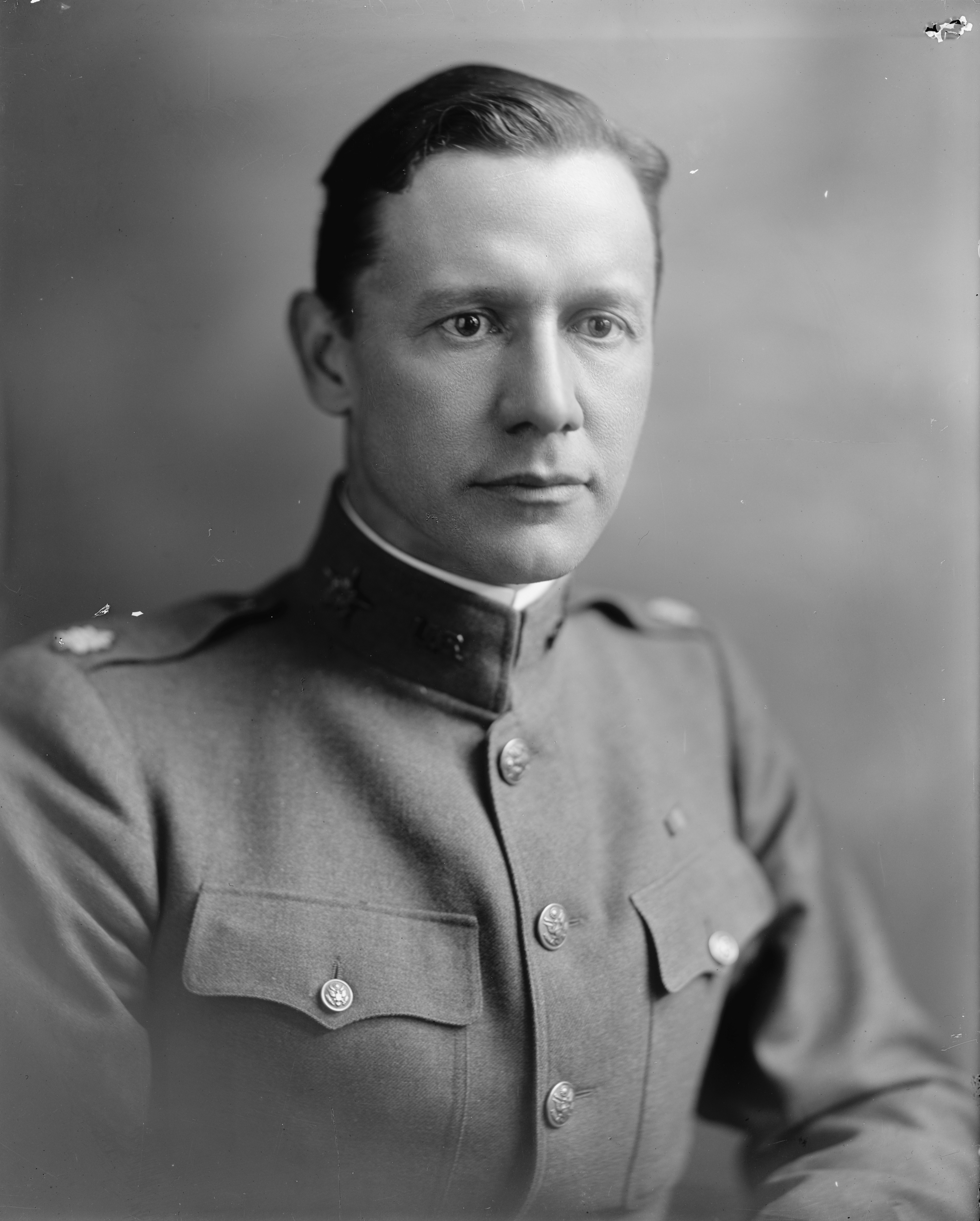
- Major General Allen Wyant Gullion; 19th Judge Advocate General of the United States Army
- Born: December 14, 1880; Carrollton, Kentucky
- Died: June 19, 1946 (aged 65); Washington, D.C.
- Military career
- Allegiance: United States
- Branch: United States Army
- Service years: 1905–1944
- Rank: Major General
- Commands: U.S. Army J.A.G. Corps; U.S. Army Military Police Corps
- Conflicts: Moro Rebellion; Pancho Villa Expedition; World War I World War II
- Awards: Distinguished Service Medal (2); Legion of Merit

Major General Allen Wyant Gullion (December 14, 1880 – June 19, 1946) was an American Army officer who served as the 19th Judge Advocate General of the United States Army from 1937 to 1941 and the 17th Provost Marshal General of the United States Army from 1941 to 1944.

== Early years ==
Allen Wyant Gullion, the son of Edmund A. Gullion and Atha Hanks, was born on December 14, 1880, in the town of Carrollton, Kentucky. He attended Centre College in Danville, Kentucky, and subsequently the United States Military Academy at West Point, New York.

== Army career ==
He graduated from West Point in the class of 1905 and was commissioned a Second lieutenant at that time. Gullion subsequently saw service during the Moro Rebellion in the Philippines. Gullion received a law degree at the University of Kentucky in 1914.

During the Pancho Villa Expedition, Gullion served with the 2nd Kentucky Infantry on the Mexican border in 1916. He was promoted to the temporary rank of Lieutenant Colonel during World War I and was assigned to the Office of the Provost Marshal, where he served as a Chief of Mobilization Division.

In 1918, Gullion was transferred to France, where he served within II Corps as a judge advocate. In 1919, Gullion was transferred back to the United States and was appointed the legal adviser of major general Robert Lee Bullard on Governors Island.

For his wartime service, Lieutenant Colonel Gullion was decorated with the Army Distinguished Service Medal for his merits in the Office of Mobilization Division.

He served as a prosecuting attorney in the court-martial of Colonel William L. Mitchell.

=== World War II ===
During World War II, Gullion was appointed the U.S. Army Provost Marshal in 1941. Gullion served in this capacity until 1944, when he was succeeded by Major General Archer L. Lerch. Gullion was a prime mover in the efforts to intern American citizens of Japanese ancestry in camps in the wake of the hysteria resulting from the Pearl Harbor attack. Gullion was subsequently attached to Supreme Headquarters Allied Expeditionary Force in Europe.

In 1943, the FBI investigated Gullion for his role in forming an extra-military organization known as the SGs which was intended "to save America from FDR, radical labor, the Communists, the Jews, and the colored race." However, within months, his poor health and age were cited for the major general's retirement in 1944.

For his wartime service, Gullion received an Oak Leaf Cluster to his Distinguished Service Medal and the Legion of Merit.

Major General Allen Wyant Gullion died on June 19, 1946, at the age of 65 years in Washington, D.C.

His ashes were strewn in the family lot at New Castle Cemetery in New Castle, Kentucky, next to the grave of his wife, Ruth Ellis Mathews Gullion (1881–1940).

== Decorations ==
Here is the ribbon bar of Major General Gullion:

1st row	Army Distinguished Service Medal with Oak Leaf Cluster		Legion of Merit	Philippine Campaign Medal
2nd row	Mexican Service Medal	World War I Victory Medal	Army of Occupation of Germany Medal	American Defense Service Medal
3rd row	American Campaign Medal	European-African-Middle Eastern Campaign Medal	World War II Victory Medal	Ecuador Order of Abdon Calderón

== In popular culture ==
Gullion was portrayed on screen by actor Rod Steiger in the 1955 picture The Court-Martial of Billy Mitchell.

Military offices
Preceded by Arthur W. Brown	Judge Advocate General of the United States Army; 1937–1941	Succeeded by Myron C. Cramer
Preceded by Harry H. Bandholtz	Provost Marshal General of the United States Army; 1941–1944	Succeeded by Archer L. Lerch
