= Leslie C. Smith =

Retired United States Army lieutenant general

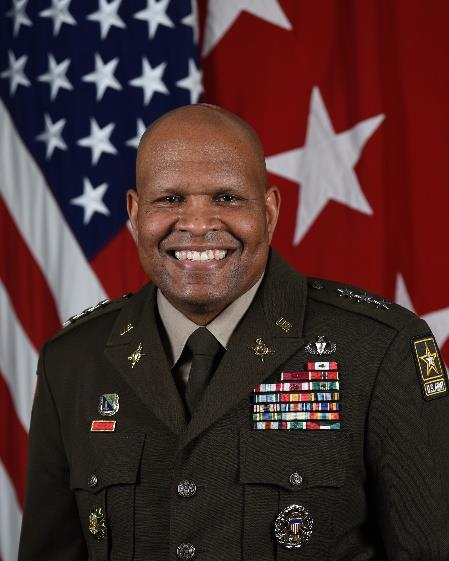
- Alma mater: Georgia Southern University (BBA); Central Michigan University (MS); National Defense University (MA)
- Military career
- Allegiance: United States
- Branch: United States Army
- Service years: 1983–2021
- Rank: Lieutenant General
- Commands: Fort Leonard Wood; 20th CBRNE Command; United States Army CBRN School; 3rd Chemical Brigade; 83d Chemical Battalion
- Conflicts: Gulf War
- Awards: Army Distinguished Service Medal (2); Legion of Merit (2); Bronze Star Medal (2)

Leslie C. Smith is a retired United States Army lieutenant general who last served as the 66th Inspector General of the United States Army. Since 2002, he has served as the vice president for leadership and education at the Association of the United States Army

== Military career ==
From 1981 to 1985, Smith earned a Bachelor of Business Administration in Accounting from Georgia Southern University, then went on to study for a Master of Science in Accounting from Central Michigan University and then a Master of Arts in National Security and Strategic Studies from the National Defense University.

During attendance at Georgia Southern University, Smith was commissioned as a Field Artillery Officer, serving with the Georgia Army National Guard. Following graduation, he was assigned as a Chemical Officer. Smith has Chemical Officer Basic and Advanced Courses and is a graduate of the Airborne School, United States Army Jumpmaster School, Command and General Staff College and National War College.

His retirement ceremony was held on August 27, 2021, though he remained The Inspector General until September 1. LTG Donna W. Martin became the 67th Inspector General of the United States Army on September 2, 2021.

== Honors and awards ==
Smith's honors and awards include:

- Army Distinguished Service Medal with one bronze oak leaf cluster
- Legion of Merit with one bronze oak leaf cluster
- Bronze Star Medal with one bronze oak leaf cluster
- Defense Meritorious Service Medal
- Meritorious Service Medal with two bronze oak leaf clusters
- Army Commendation Medal with one bronze oak leaf cluster
- Joint Service Achievement Medal
- National Defense Service Medal with one bronze service star
- Armed Force Expeditionary Medal
- Southwest Asia Service Medal with two service stars
- Global War on Terrorism Expeditionary Medal
- Global War on Terrorism Service Medal
- Korea Defense Service Medal
- Armed Forces Reserve Medal
- Army Service Ribbon
- Army Overseas Service Ribbon
- Kuwait Liberation Medal (Saudi Arabia)
- Kuwait Liberation Medal (Kuwait)
- Army Meritorious Unit Commendation
- Senior Parachutist Badge
- Joint Chiefs of Staff Identification Badge
- Army Staff Identification Badge
- College of Business Administration Alumni Award

Military offices
Preceded by James H. Dickinson	Deputy Inspector General of the United States Army; 2015–2018	Succeeded by Donald E. Jackson
Preceded by David E. Quantock	Inspector General of the United States Army; 2018–2021	Succeeded by Donna W. Martin
