= Donna W. Martin =

66th Inspector General of the United States Army

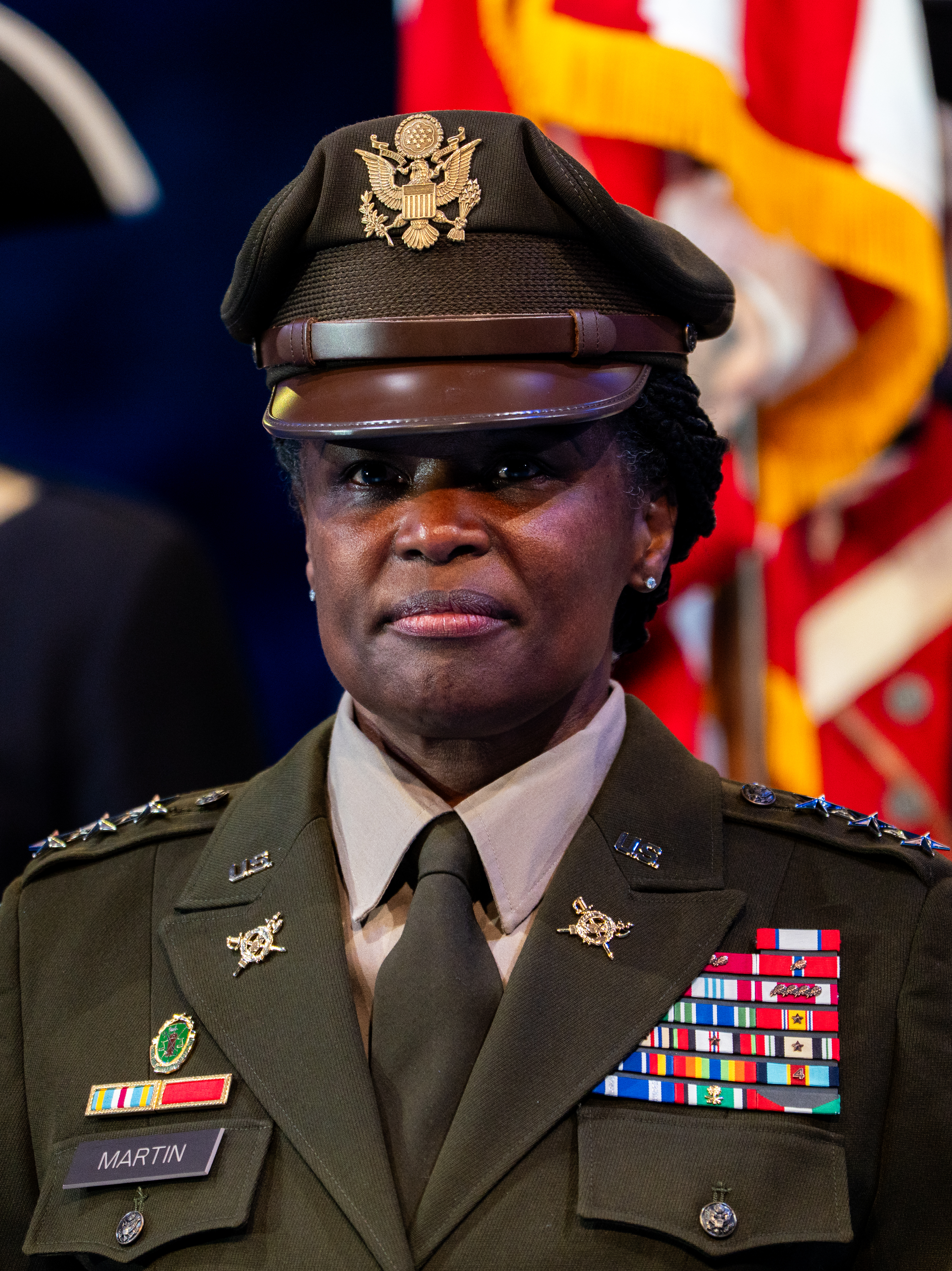
- Lieutenant General Donna Martin at her retirement ceremony March 7, 2025, at Joint Base Myer-Henderson Hall, Virginia.
- Born: Yorktown, Virginia, U.S.
- Education: Old Dominion University (BSCJ); United States Army War College (MSS)
- Military career
- Allegiance: United States of America
- Branch: United States Army
- Service years: 1988–2025
- Rank: Lieutenant General
- Commands: Office of the Inspector General of the United States Army; United States Army Criminal Investigation Command; United States Army Corrections Command; Rear Detachment, 18th Military Police Brigade; 202nd Military Police Group (Criminal Investigation Division); 385th Military Police Battalion (Dragoons)
- Awards: Army Distinguished Service Medal; Legion of Merit (4); Bronze Star Medal

Donna Whitley Martin is a retired United States Army lieutenant general who served as the Inspector General of the United States Army from 2021 to 2025. She is the first female Inspector General of the Army. She previously served as the 18th United States Army Provost Marshal General / Commanding General, United States Army Criminal Investigation Command, from 2020 to 2021. She was also the commanding general of the United States Army Maneuver Support Center of Excellence and Fort Leonard Wood, and prior to that was commandant of the United States Military Police School from 2017 to 2018 and deputy commanding general of the United States Army Recruiting Command from 2015 to 2017.

In June 2021, she was nominated for promotion to lieutenant general, to the Office of the Inspector General of the United States Army. Martin was replaced as Provost Marshal General by her deputy, Brigadier General Duane R. Miller on 5 August 2021; she assumed her post as the 67th Inspector General of the Army on 2 September 2021. Gregory J. Brady succeeded her as the Inspector General on 17 March 2025. Martin retired from the Army 30 April 2025 after nearly 37 years of service.

== Awards and decorations ==
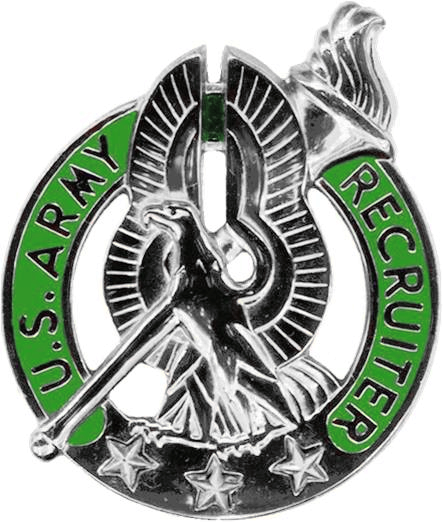
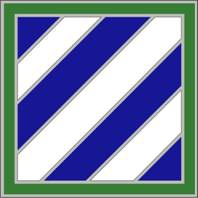
Basic Army Recruiter Badge
3rd Infantry Division Combat Service Identification Badge
Military Police Corps Distinctive Unit Insignia
5 Overseas Service Bars

Army Distinguished Service Medal with oak leaf cluster
Legion of Merit with two oak leaf clusters
Bronze Star Medal with oak leaf cluster
Defense Meritorious Service Medal
Meritorious Service Medal with four oak leaf clusters
Army Commendation Medal with silver oak leaf cluster
Army Achievement Medal
Joint Meritorious Unit Award
Army Meritorious Unit Commendation
National Defense Service Medal with one bronze service star
Southwest Asia Service Medal with three service stars
Afghanistan Campaign Medal with service star
Iraq Campaign Medal with service star
Global War on Terrorism Service Medal
Army Service Ribbon
Army Overseas Service Ribbon with bronze award numeral 4
NATO Medal for Service with ISAF
Kuwait Liberation Medal (Saudi Arabia)
Kuwait Liberation Medal (Kuwait)

Military offices
Preceded by Kevin Vereen	Commandant of the United States Army Military Police School and Chief of Military Police Corps; 2017–2018	Succeeded by Brian R. Bisacre
Preceded by Kent Savre	Commanding General of the United States Army Maneuver Support Center of Excellence; 2018–2020	Succeeded by James E. Bonner
Preceded by Kevin Vereen	United States Army Provost Marshal General; 2020–2021	Succeeded by Duane R. Miller
Preceded by Leslie C. Smith	Inspector General of the United States Army; 2021–2025	Succeeded by Gregory J. Brady
