= Carl C. Turner =

United States Army officer (1913–1996)

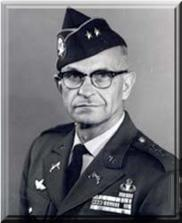
- Major General Carl C. Turner

Chief, Executive Office for United States Marshals
- In office 5 March 1969 – 4 September 1969
- President: Richard Nixon
- Preceded by: Jack Cameron
- Succeeded by: Donald A. Synott

Personal details
- Born: 10 April 1913 Altus, Oklahoma, U.S.
- Died: 31 December 1996 (aged 83)
- Resting place: Arlington National Cemetery
- Education: Southwestern Oklahoma State University (BS); George Washington University (MS)

Military service
- Allegiance: United States
- Branch/service: United States Army
- Years of service: 1935–1968
- Rank: Major General
- Commands: United States Army Provost Marshal General
- Battles/wars: World War II
- Awards: Bronze Star; Army Commendation Medal (2)

Carl C. Turner (10 April 1913 – 31 December 1996) was a Major general in the United States Army. His highest rank was as Army Provost Marshal General from 1964 to 1968; in that post he was involved in the responses to some of the major civil and political disturbances of the 1960s. Following his retirement from the Army, he served briefly as Chief, Executive Office for United States Marshals in 1969. In 1971 he pled guilty to charges of illegal firearms transactions and income tax evasion and was sentenced to three years in prison.

== Early life and education ==
He was born on 10 April 1913 in Altus, Oklahoma. He attended Southwestern Teachers College, graduating in May 1939 with a Bachelor of Science degree.

== Military career ==
He enlisted in the 45th Infantry Division, part of the Oklahoma National Guard in 1930 at the age of 17.

He was commissioned as an infantry officer in the United States Army in 1935 and served in the European theatre in World War II. During his service in Europe he was awarded the Bronze Star.

He joined the Military Police Corps in 1950. At some point during his career, he attended George Washington University and earned a master's degree.

Turner became Provost marshal of XVIII Airborne Corps in 1956. In 1958 he joined the office of the Army Provost Marshal General. In 1960 he became assistant chief of staff of XVIII Airborne Corps and qualified as a master parachutist. In May 1961 he became provost marshal at Headquarters, Seventh Army in West Germany. In October 1961 he was nominated for promotion to Brigadier general. From 1962 to 1964 he served as provost marshal of the US Army Europe and during this time he graduated from the Bundeswehr parachute school.

He served as Army Provost Marshal General from 1 July 1964 until 30 September 1968. On 15 August 1965, in meetings at the White House to plan the use of federal troops to quell the Watts riot he was designated as the personal representative of the Army chief of staff, one of three senior officials to oversee the operation in Los Angeles. Turner was appointed to a similar role during the July 1967 Detroit riot. On 29 August 1967 he led military police enforcing a ban on Nazi insignia and uniforms worn by mourners to attend the funeral of American Nazi Party leader George Lincoln Rockwell at Culpeper National Cemetery in Virginia. Turner said "I am going to protect federal property... No one will be permitted in here with Nazi uniform and insignia." Turner ordered the arrest of an uniformed active duty soldier attending the funeral. During the October 1967 March on the Pentagon, Turner advised Attorney General Ramsey Clark that the demonstrators were "highly angry, emotional, brave and daring." They had gassed the troops in some instances, he said, and broken through and overrun them in others. They had to be pushed back and, as he saw it, that was going to take "some cold steel and possibly gas." In November 1967 Federal Bureau of Investigation (FBI) Director J. Edgar Hoover presented Turner with a special award for "valuable assistance to the FBI." In March 1968 at a planning meeting for expected summer riots he advocated a tough approach towards rioters calling them criminals and rejected describing riots as "civil disobedience." During the April 1968 Chicago riots he again served as personal representative of the Army chief of staff. He performed the same role during the August 1968 Democratic National Convention protests in Chicago. Turner asserted that "the Chicago Police Department, under extremely trying circumstances, successfully accomplished their [sic] mission of maintaining law and order... with professional restraint and control."

== PX Scandal ==
After working as a security consultant, he was appointed by the Nixon administration as Chief, Executive Office for United States Marshals on 5 March 1969, but was forced to resign on 4 September 1969 after becoming a central figure in the Senate Permanent Subcommittee on Investigations' inquiry into the military club system, known as the PX Scandal.

Turner was accused of having ignored William O. Wooldridge's earlier theft and AWOL offenses that were notified to him at the time Wooldridge's appointment as first Sergeant Major of the Army was announced in late 1966. Turner was later accused of having covered up an attempt by Wooldridge to smuggle 8-9 cases of liquor aboard General Creighton Abrams' KC-135 jet in April 1967. In late 1967 Turner ordered the United States Army Criminal Investigation Division that Wooldridge's name be removed from the list of soldiers being investigated into irregularities at the Non-commissioned officer (NCO) club at Fort Benning. Turner was also accused of having suppressed the Augsburg File which detailed the corruption of Wooldridge and other NCOs of the 24th Infantry Division in Augsburg, West Germany in the early 1960s. The subcommittee concluded that Turner had given Wooldridge and his associates immunity from investigation and "was grossly negligent in the performance of his official duties."

On 26 September 1969 the Army revoked his award of the Distinguished Service Medal, given to him on his retirement from the Army.

In January 1971 he was indicted by a Federal grand jury for illegal firearms transactions and income tax evasion which had come to light during the PX Scandal. In April 1971 he pleaded guilty to soliciting 136 firearms confiscated by the Chicago Police Department, which he misrepresented as a gift for the Army. Turner stated that half of the guns had been given to the Army, but that he had sold at least 23 weapons to a gun dealer and destroyed or traded the rest. In May 1971 Turner was sentenced to 39 months in prison, but was paroled from the Federal Correctional Complex, Allenwood, Pennsylvania in September 1972.

In a 2 April 1971 The New York Times op-ed entitled "The Ordeal of the Army", retired General Matthew Ridgway cited the Turner case, the PX Scandal and the My Lai massacre inquiry as the most grievous blows on the Army's public image in his lifetime.

== Death ==
He died of a heart attack on 31 December 1996 and was buried at Arlington National Cemetery.
