= USADIP =

USADIP (United States Army Deserter Information Point) served as the focal point for U.S. Army deserter reporting by U.S. Army commanders. Its mission was to maintain, verify, and disseminate information on regular Army, Army Reserve and Army National Guard deserters to military and civilian law enforcement agencies and U.S. Army commanders; to enter and maintain active Army deserters into the Wanted Person File of the FBI National Crime Information Center in order to effect the return to military control of Army deserters.

USADIP was a component of the United States Army Provost Marshal General, serving as part of the operations side of the OPMG (Office of the Provost Marshal General) HQ Staff. Effective 1 October 2021 the USADIP mission was decentralized and is currently the direct responsibility of the law enforcement unit that supports the Deserter Soldier's parent unit.

Once a deserter Soldier surrendered or was arrested, USADIP would have been notified and extradition arranged by the U.S. Army installation responsible for that area of extradition in conjunction with the soldier's parent unit. This responsibility now falls to the law enforcement unit that directly supports the Deserter Soldier's parent unit.

The U.S. Army regulations that currently prescribe policies and outline the U.S Army law enforcement responsibilities for the Military Absentee and Deserter fugitive apprehension program:

1. Army Regulation (AR) 190–9, Military Police "Absentee Deserter Apprehension Program and Surrender of Military Personnel to Civilian Law Enforcement Agencies", published on 28 September 2015.

2. AR 190-45, Military Police "law Enforcement Reporting", published on 27 September 2016.
