= United States Army Human Resources Command =

U.S. Army direct reporting unit

U.S. Army Human Resources Command
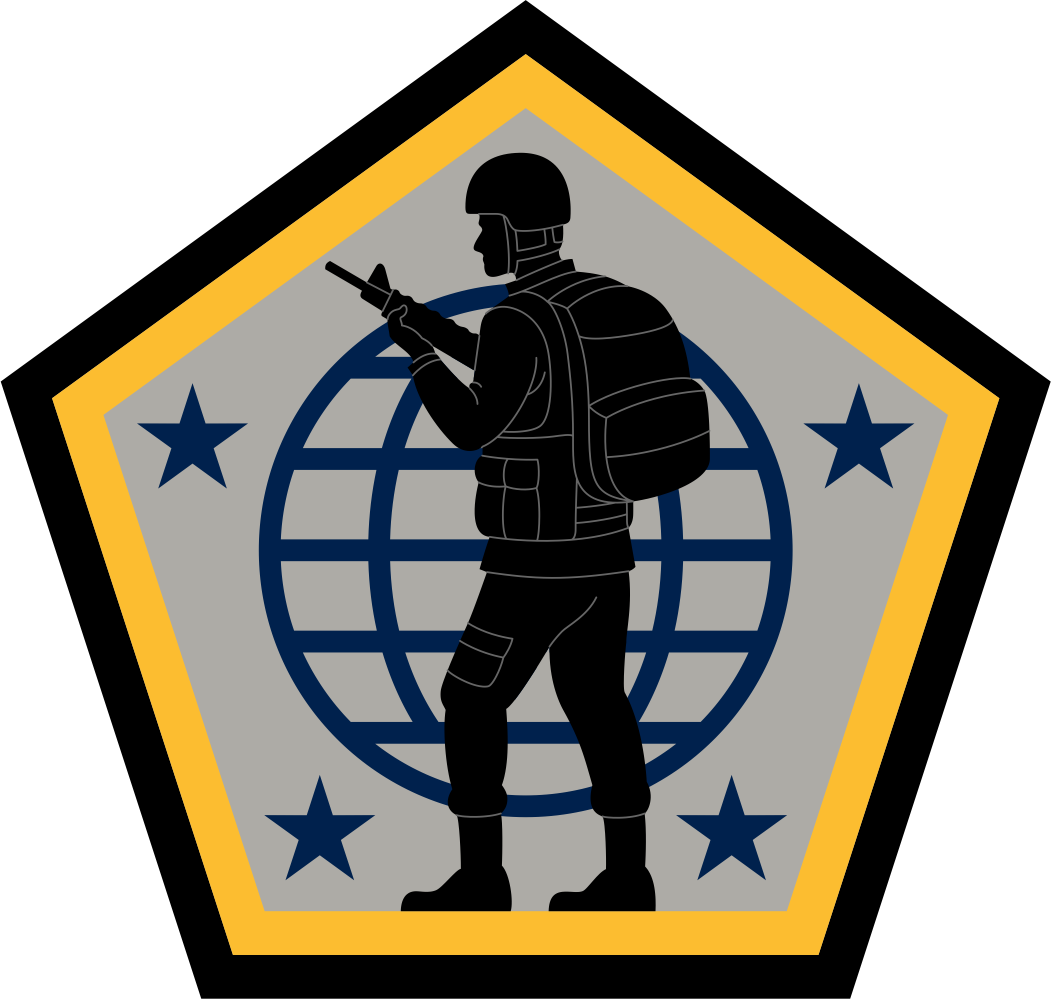
- HRC's shoulder sleeve insignia
- Active: 1 October 2003 – present
- Country: United States
- Branch: United States Army
- Type: Direct Reporting Unit
- Role: Human Resources Management
- Size: Command
- Part of: Department of Defense; Department of the Army
- Garrison/HQ: Fort Knox, Kentucky
- Motto: "Soldiers First"
- Website: Official website

Commanders
- Current commander: Major General Hope C. Rampy

Insignia
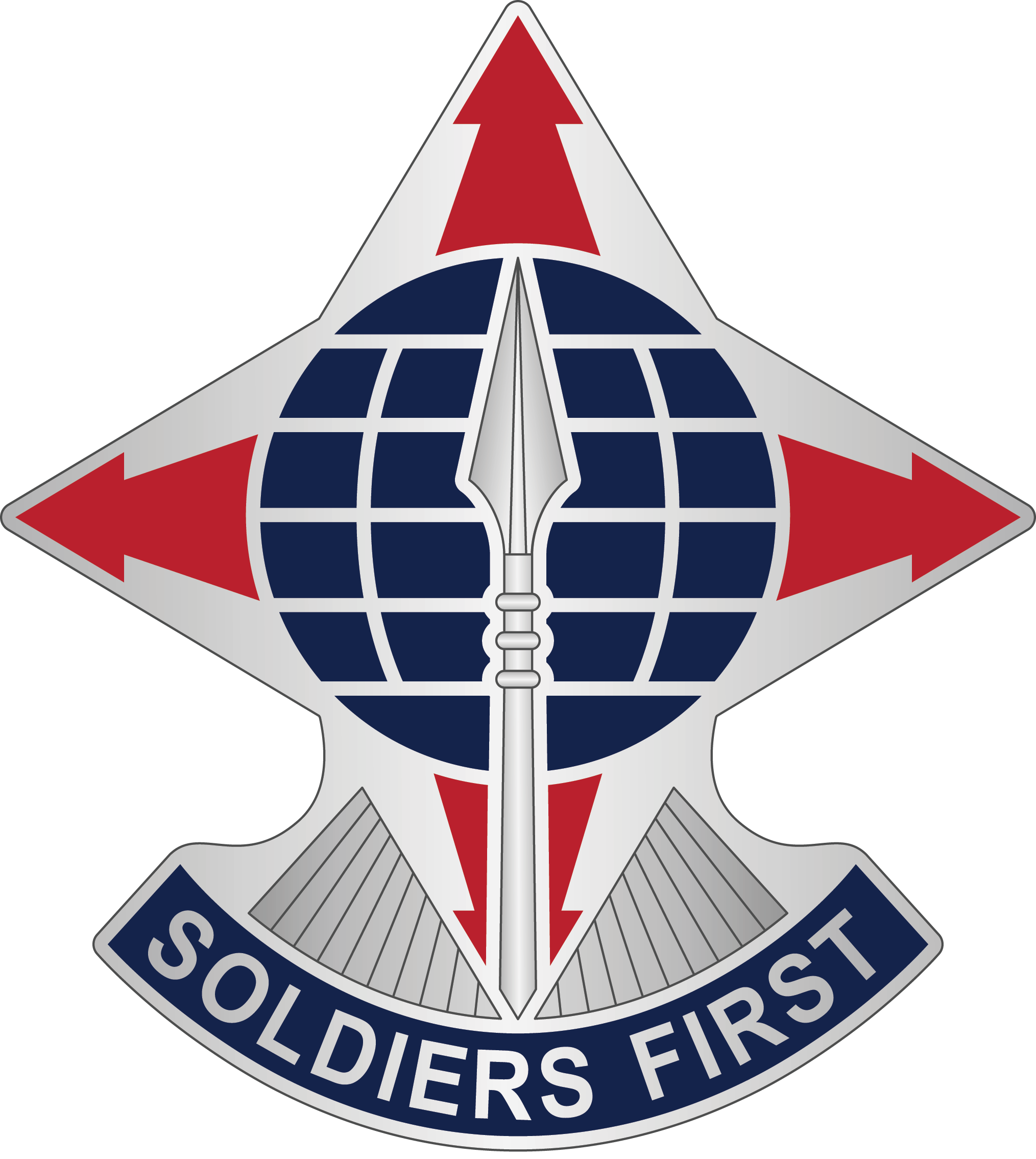
- Distinctive unit insignia

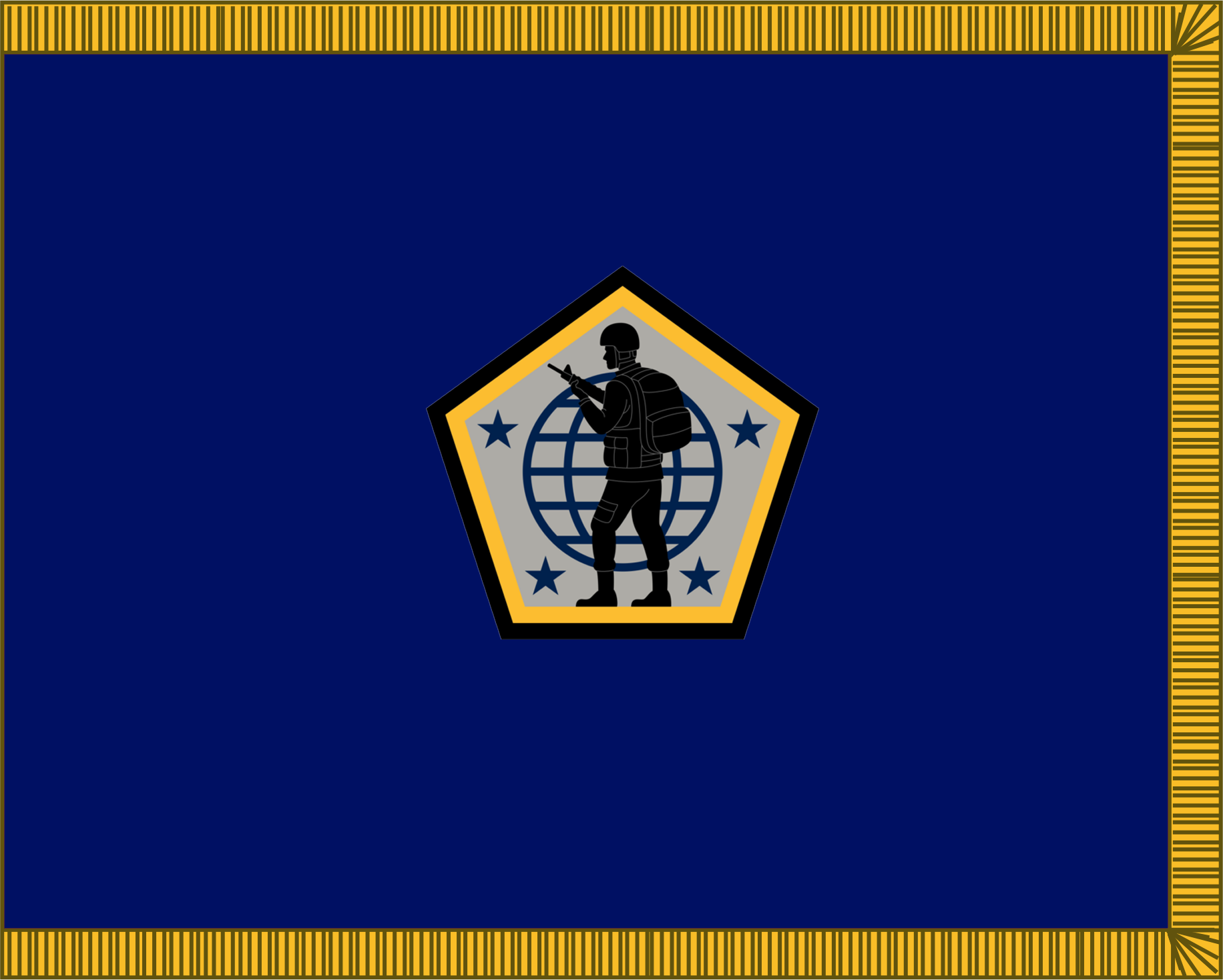
- US Army Human Resources Command Flag

The United States Army Human Resources Command (Army HRC or simply HRC) is a command of the United States Army. HRC is a direct reporting unit (DRU) supervised by the Office of the Deputy Chief of Staff for Personnel (DCS), G-1, focused on improving the career management potential of Army soldiers.

From basic training through retirement, Regular Army and United States Army Reserve Soldiers have one agency to assist in career management.

HRC is located in Fort Knox, Kentucky, and includes 40 operational elements around the country under the leadership of the HRC commander. HRC is the functional proponent for military personnel management (except for the Judge Advocate General's Corps and the Chaplain Corps). HRC also supports the Director, United States Army National Guard, and the Chief, Army Reserve, in their management of the Selected Reserve.

The HRC commander is also the commander of the Individual Ready Reserve (IRR), the Standby Reserve, and the Retired Reserve.

== History ==
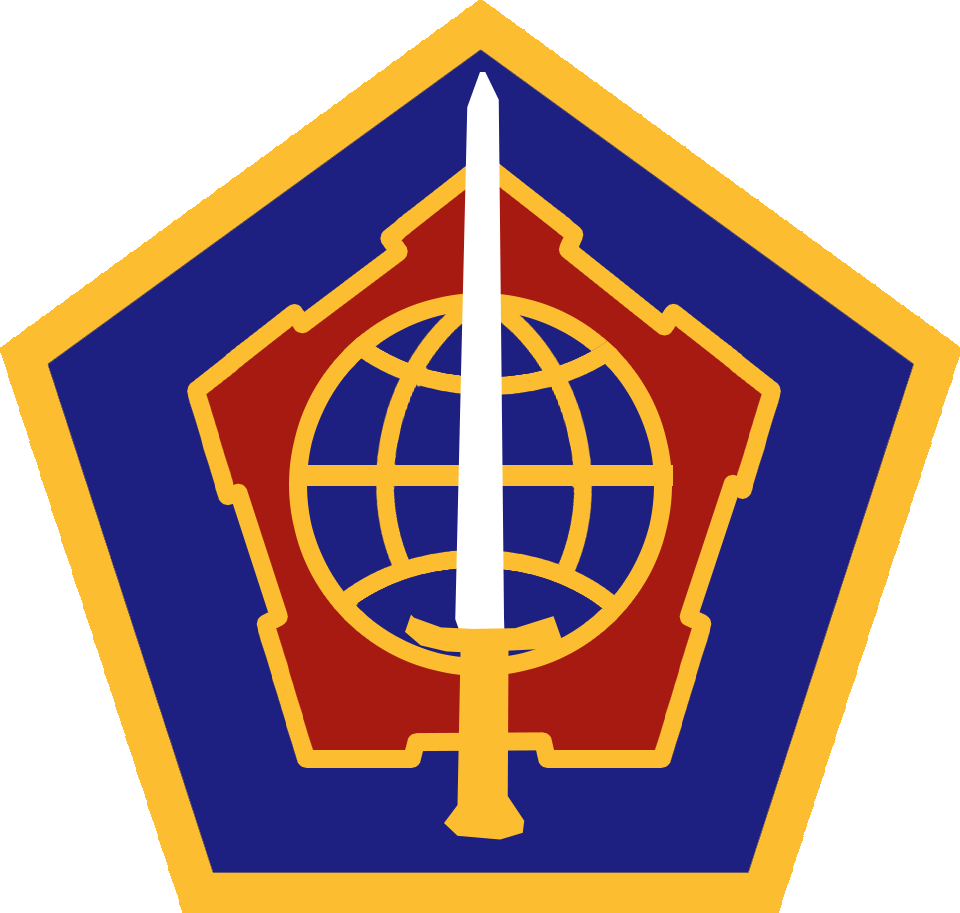
US ARMY MILPERCEN SSI

The first predecessor of the HRC was the U.S. Army Military Personnel Center (MILPERCEN), which was activated 1 January 1973 by consolidating the Officer Personnel Directorate, Enlisted Personnel Directorate and the Personnel Management Development Directorate; the Personnel Information Systems Directorate; and the Personnel Actions and Records Directorate. In 1988, MILPERCEN became DA-PERSCOM or Department of the Army Personnel Command, later renamed United States Total Army Personnel Agency (USTAPA).

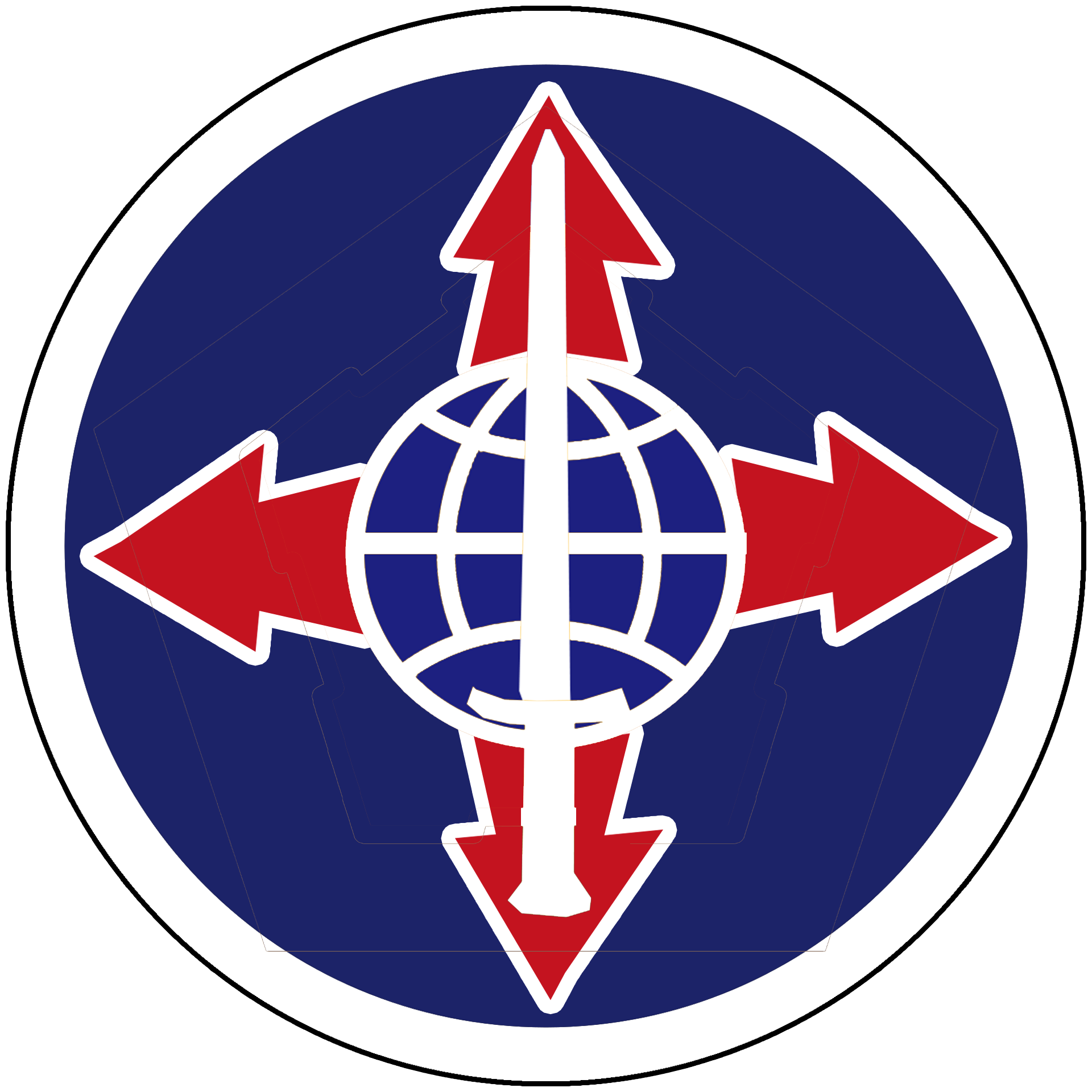
US ARMY TOTAL ARMY PERSONNEL AGENCY SSI

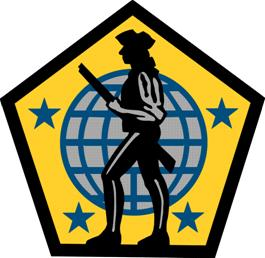
AR-PERSCOM SSI

HRC was established in 2003 from the merger of the United States Total Army Personnel Agency (USTAPA) in Alexandria, Virginia and the United States Army Reserve Personnel Command (AR-PERSCOM) in St. Louis, Missouri. PERSCOM and AR-PERSCOM were inactivated 1 October 2003. HRC was a field operating agency of the DCS, G-1 prior to December 2017. MG Dorian T. Anderson, a career Infantry Officer was Commanding during the activation, thus was the last PERSCOM Commanding General and the first HRC Commanding General.

HRC came under the Department of Defense 2005 Base Realignment and Closure (BRAC) Commission. Recommendations were put forth to create the Human Resources Center of Excellence, and HRC was directed to move its elements in Alexandria, Virginia, Indianapolis, Indiana, and St. Louis, Missouri to a new facility at Fort Knox, Kentucky, by 2011.

The HRC complex was named and dedicated in honor of Lieutenant General Timothy J. Maude, who perished on September 11th, 2001, in the attack on the Pentagon. At his time of death, Maude was serving as the United States Army Deputy Chief of Staff for Personnel, G-1. The complex is the largest single building project in the history of Fort Knox, totaling 883,180 square feet (82,050 m^{2}). It is a three-story, six-winged, red-brick facility.

== List of commanding generals ==
No.	Commanding General		Term		
No.	Portrait	Name	Took office	Left office	Duration
-	Sean J. Byrne	Major General; Sean J. Byrne	September 2006	October 14, 2010	~4 years, 43 days
-	Gina S. Farrisee	Major General; Gina S. Farrisee	October 14, 2010	August 16, 2012	1 year, 307 days
-	Richard P. Mustion	Major General; Richard P. Mustion	August 16, 2012	June 5, 2015	2 years, 293 days
-	Thomas C. Seamands	Major General; Thomas C. Seamands	June 5, 2015	April 28, 2017	1 year, 327 days
-	Jason T. Evans	Major General; Jason T. Evans	April 28, 2017	July 1, 2019	2 years, 64 days
-	Joseph R. Calloway	Major General; Joseph R. Calloway	July 1, 2019	July 5, 2021	2 years, 4 days
-	Thomas R. Drew	Major General; Thomas R. Drew	July 5, 2021	July 9, 2024	3 years, 4 days
-	Hope C. Rampy	Major General; Hope C. Rampy	July 9, 2024	Incumbent	2 years, 69 days
