= Hope Rampy =

American Commanding General

Hope C. Rampy
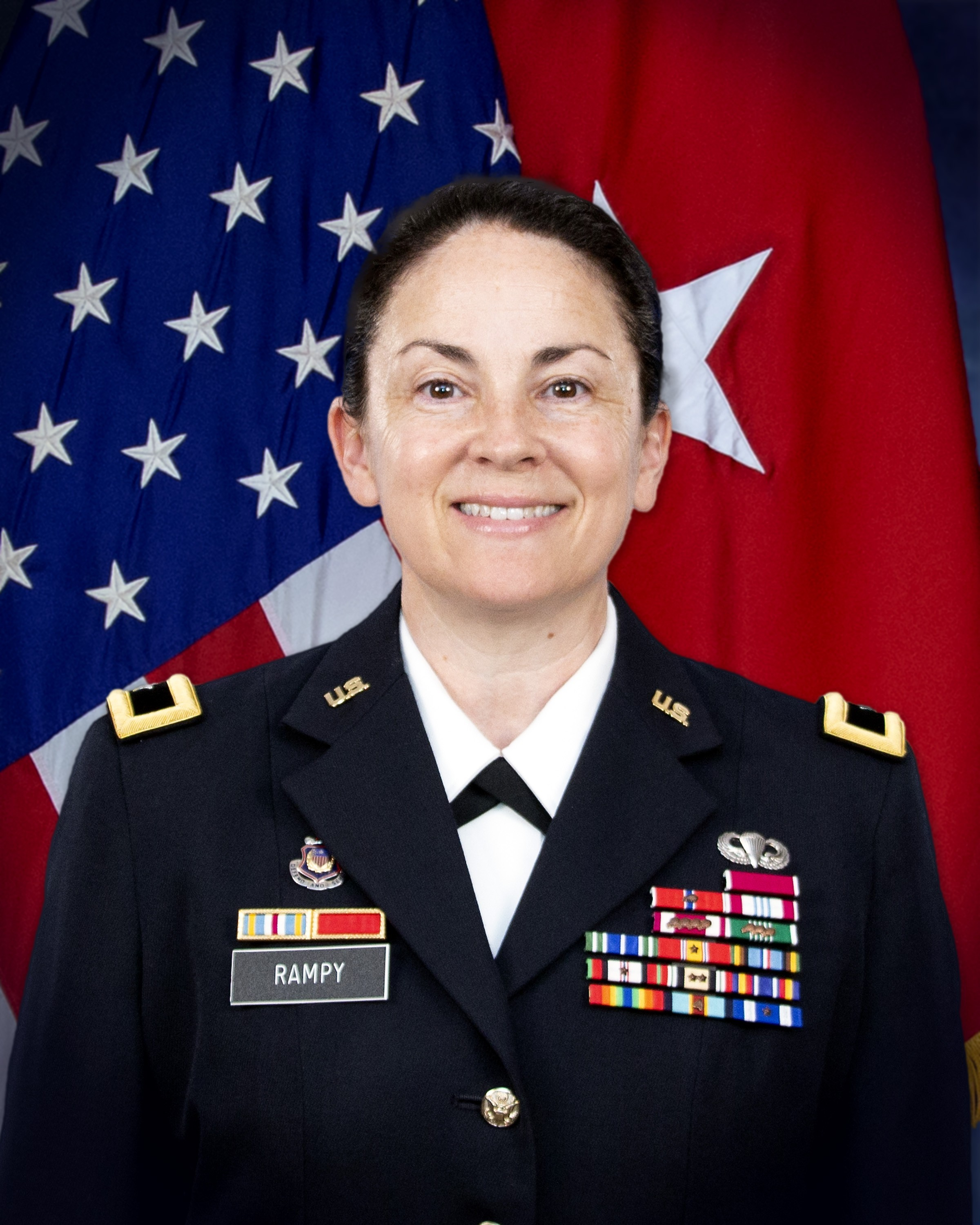
- Education: Cameron University, University of Texas
- Military career
- Allegiance: United States
- Branch: United States Army
- Service years: 1996–present
- Rank: Major General
- Commands: The 62nd Adjutant General of the Army, U.S. Army Human Resources Command
- Conflicts: War in Afghanistan; Iraq War
- Awards: Army Distinguished Service Medal, Legion of Merit

Major General Hope C. Rampy is an American military officer. In 2024 she was named Commanding General for the United States Army Human Resources Command based in Fort Knox, Kentucky.

== Biography ==
Rampy is from Lawton, Oklahoma. Rampy started college at the University of Oklahoma, but later transferred to Cameron University where she joined the ROTC program to pay for college. She later graduated from Cameron University with a Bachelor of Arts degree in political science and decided to make a career of military service. In May 1996, Rampy was commissioned as an Adjutant General's Corps officer into the United States Army as a distinguished military graduate.

In 2008, she deployed to Iraq with the 1st Cavalry Division.

In December 2011, Rampy took command of the 4th Brigade Special Troops Battalion, 4th Brigade Combat Team, 1st Cavalry Division and deployed to Afghanistan in November 2012.

In 2016 Rampy was promoted to colonel, becoming the first female graduate of Cameron University to achieve the rank.

In July 2020, Rampy was invested as the 62nd Adjutant General of the United States Army. She became the fifth female officer named Adjutant General of the Army.

In 2023, Rampy made headlines for her efforts to re-recruit U.S. Army soldiers who were separated from the military for refusing the COVID-19 vaccine. During the 118th Congress, Rampy was nominated to the post of Major General. In December 2023, Rampy was confirmed by the U.S. Senate as major general, after a 10-month delay by Tommy Tuberville.

In March 2024, Rampy was named Commanding General for the United States Army Human Resources Command based in Fort Knox, Kentucky.

== Decorations and honors ==
- Army Distinguished Service Medal
- Legion of Merit (two oak leaf clusters)
- Bronze Star Medal (one oak leaf cluster)
- Defense Meritorious Service Medal
- Meritorious Service Medal (four oak leaf clusters)
- Army Commendation Medal (one oak leaf cluster)
- Army Achievement Medal (one oak leaf cluster)
- National Defense Service Medal with Bronze Star
- Armed Forces Expeditionary Medal
- Afghan Campaign Medal
- Iraq Campaign Medal
- Global War on Terror Service Medal
- Army Service Ribbon
- Overseas Service Ribbon
- NATO Medal with Bronze Star
- Meritorious Unit Commendation
- Joint Staff Badge
- Army Staff Badge
- Parachutist Badge
