= Brigadier General David H. Stem Award =

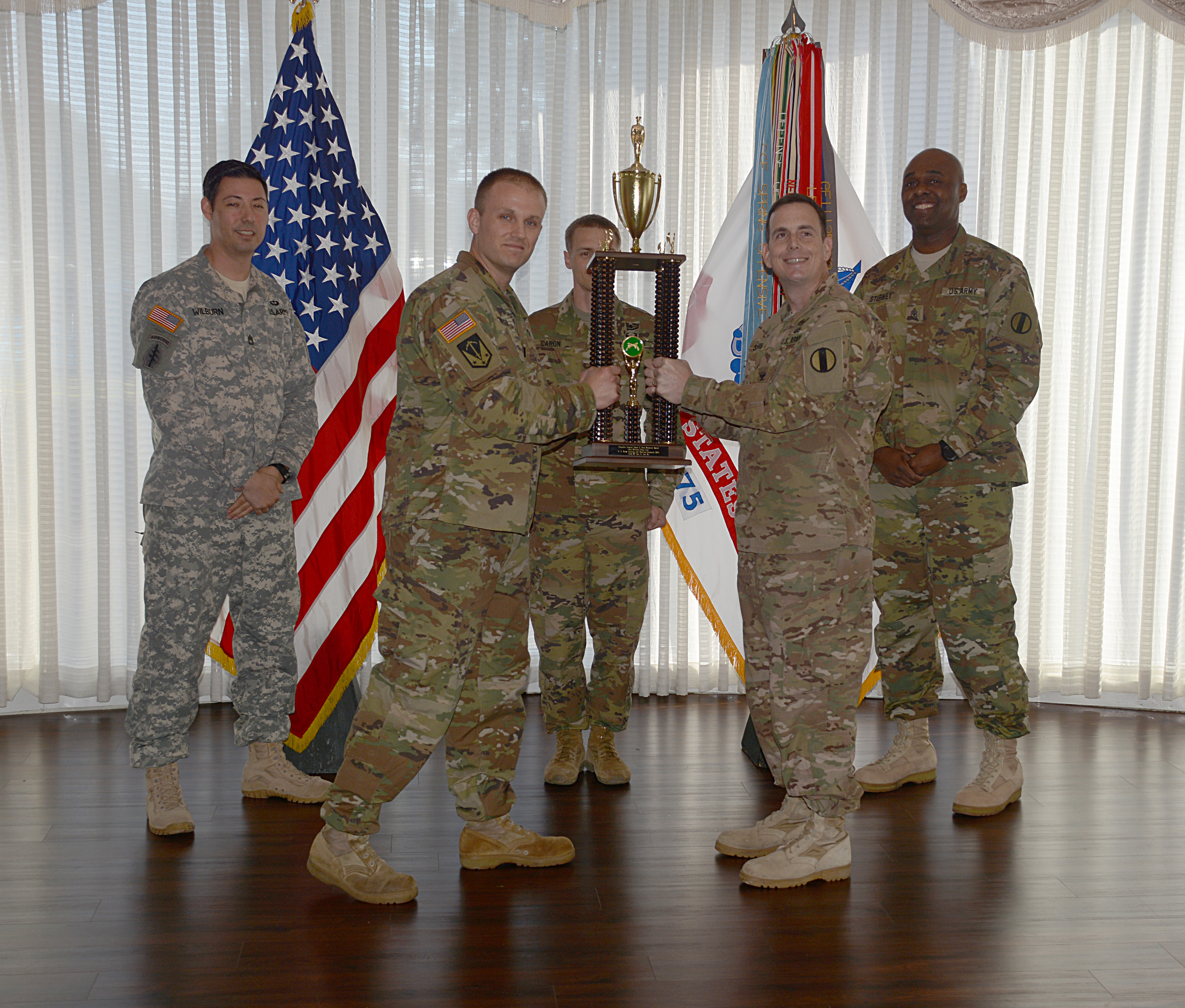
The 217th Military Police Detachment receives the David H. Stem Award in 2015

The Brigadier General David H. Stem Award is a unit trophy annually awarded by the United States Army to a Military Police unit.

The trophy was created in 1985 as the Liberty Award. Two years later it was renamed in honor of David H. Stem, the commandant of the United States Military Police School who died in a 1987 airplane crash.

The trophy is given annually to "best military police unit in the U.S. Army Training and Doctrine Command" (TRADOC). It is considered a unit trophy as provided for in Army Regulation 600–8–22. Units are scored against several specific criteria including the unit's Army Physical Fitness Test and weapons qualification averages, unit deployments, and personnel re-enlistment totals. The unit which receives the award is placed under consideration for the Brigadier General Jeremiah P. Holland Award as TRADOC's nominee.

== See also ==
- Brigadier General Thomas F. Barr Award
