= David E. Quantock =

US Army general

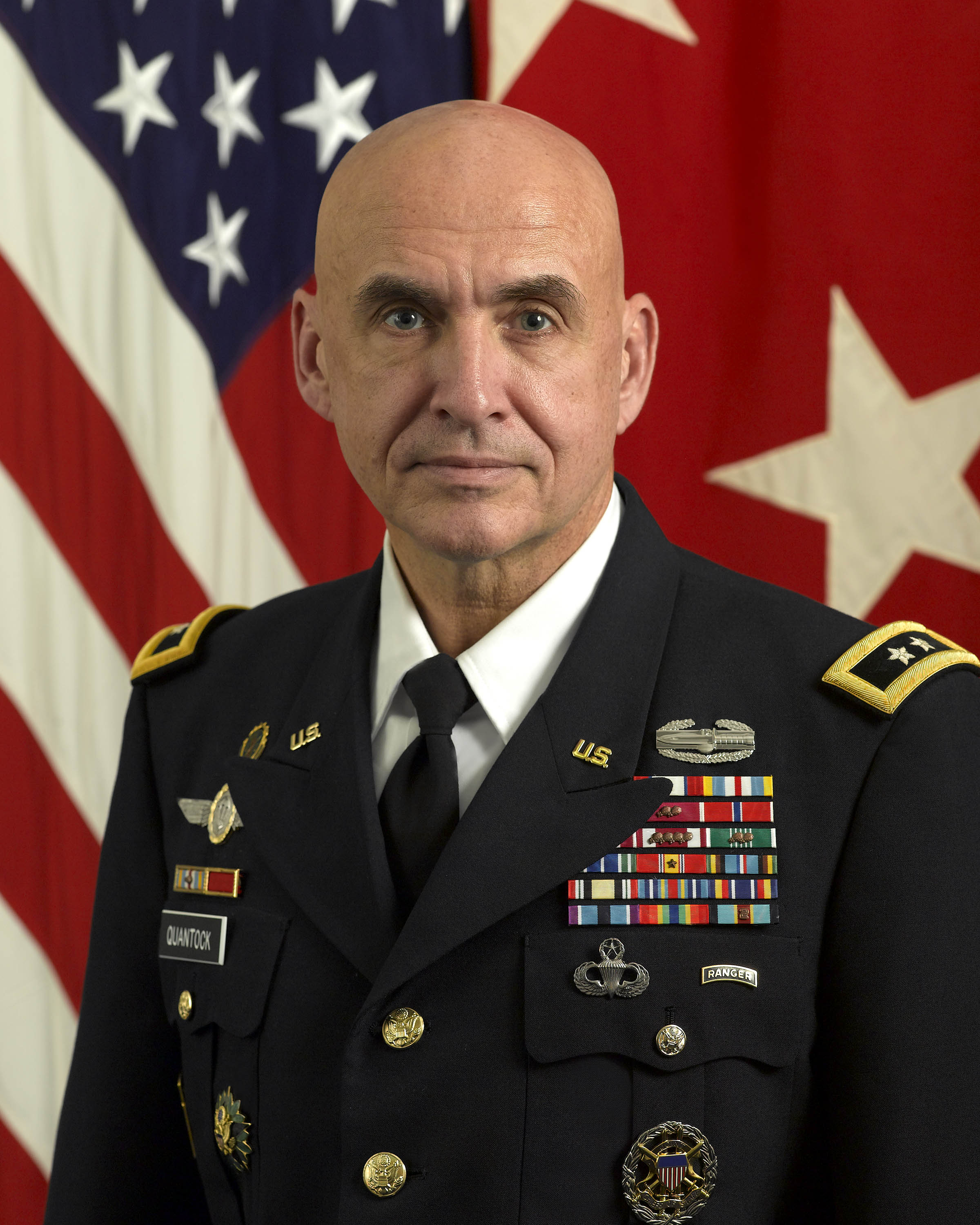
- Lieutenant General David Quantock in c. 2014
- Military career
- Allegiance: United States
- Branch: United States Army
- Service years: 1980–2018
- Rank: Lieutenant General
- Commands: United States Army Provost Marshal General; United States Army Criminal Investigation Command; United States Army Military Police School; 16th Military Police Brigade; 504th Military Police Battalion
- Conflicts: Operation Urgent Fury; Operation Uphold Democracy; Iraq War
- Awards: Army Distinguished Service Medal; Defense Superior Service Medal; Legion of Merit (3); Bronze Star Medal

David E. Quantock is a retired Lieutenant General of the United States Army who served as Inspector General of the United States Army from 2014 to 2018.

== Military career ==
Quantock began his Army career as a second lieutenant with the 558th Military Police Company at Kriegsfeld Army Depot (North Point) Germany. His career continued as an officer with various leadership assignments including Commander of 504th Military Police Battalion, Commander of the 16th Military Police Brigade, Commandant, United States Army Military Police School, Fort Leonard Wood, Missouri, Provost Marshal General of the United States Army and Commander of the United States Army Criminal Investigation Command.

Quantock's deployments include Operation Island Breeze (Grenada), Operation Uphold Democracy and Operation Restore Democracy (Haiti), and Operation Iraqi Freedom (Iraq).

=== Abu Ghraib ===
After the Abu Ghraib incident, in early 2004, then Colonel Quantock was called in as commander of the 16th Military Police Brigade to relieve the 800th Military Police Brigade. Quantock relieved Brigadier General Janis Karpinski on 14 January 2004, and was given responsibility to break down and rebuild the Abu Ghraib prison during the sensitive media frenzy that followed the revelations of abuse by members of the 800th.

== Personal life and education ==
Quantock and his wife have three children.

Quantock graduated from Norwich University with a Bachelor of Science degree in criminal justice in 1980. He holds a Master of Science degree in computer science from the Naval Postgraduate School, a Master of Public Administration degree from Troy State University, and a Master of Science in strategic studies from the United States Army War College.
