= Archer L. Lerch =

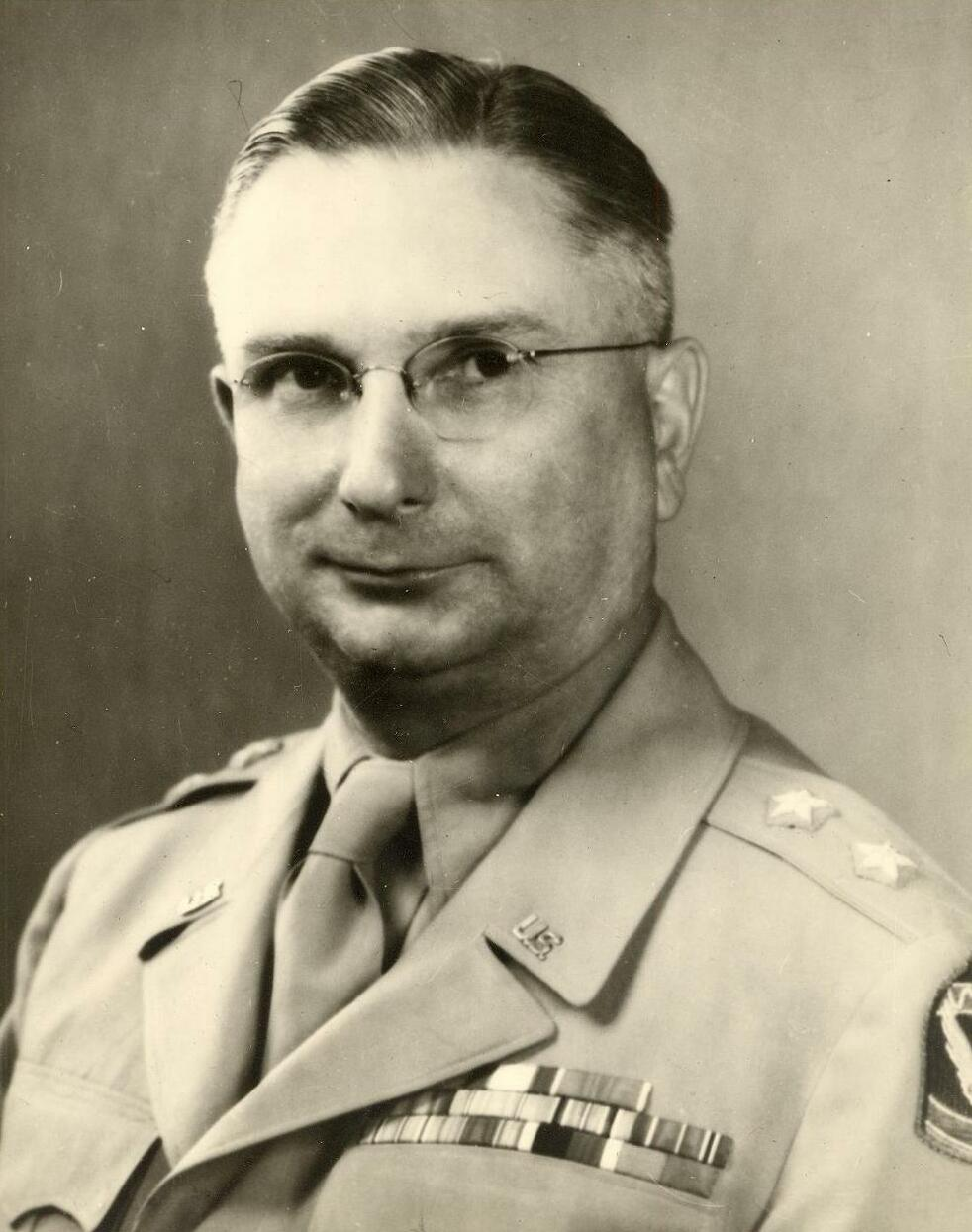
- Born: Archer Lynn Lerch; January 12, 1894; Sumner, Nebraska, US
- Died: September 11, 1947 (aged 53); Seoul, South Korea
- Education: University of California (B.A.); George Washington University (L.L.B.)
- Military career
- Allegiance: United States
- Branch: United States Army
- Service years: 1917–1947
- Rank: Major General
- Conflicts: World War I World War II: Operation Blacklist Forty †
- Awards: Distinguished Service Medal

Archer Lynn Lerch (January 12, 1894 - September 11, 1947) was a United States Army officer with the rank of Major general, who served as Provost Marshal General of the Army during World War II.

== Early life and career ==
Lerch was born in Sumner, Nebraska. He enrolled in the University of California, graduating in 1917 with a Bachelor of Arts. Shortly thereafter Lerch was drafted into the Officers Reserve Corps and commissioned a Second Lieutenant, assigned to the 63rd Infantry Regiment. He was quickly commissioned to the Regular Army and served with the American Expeditionary Forces in France during 1918.

Following the end of World War I, Lerch attained the rank of Captain and was stationed in California, the Philippines, and Hawaii. He served as a legal advisor to the Hawaiian Public Works Administration, and was promoted to the rank of Major in August 1935, after which he underwent further infantry training at the U.S. Army's Command and General Staff School in Fort Leavenworth. He was responsible for the prosecution and court-martial of notorious draft dodger, Grover Cleveland Bergdoll.

== World War II ==
Lerch was promoted to Lieutenant colonel in August 1940. He obtained a Bachelor of Laws from George Washington University in 1942 and was subsequently admitted to the American Bar Association. After the United States entered World War II, Lerch was assigned to the Army of the United States and was stationed at Fort Custer Training Center, where he was Commandant of the Provost Marshal General School. On June 21, 1944, Lerch became Provost Marshal General of the U.S. Army, a capacity in which he served until December 3, 1945. In recognition for his service as Provost Marshal General, Lerch was awarded the Distinguished Service Medal.

Following his service as a Provost Marshal, Lerch participated in Operation Blacklist Forty, serving with the Eighth Army as the deputy US military governor of South Korea. While stationed in Korea, Lerch suffered a massive heart attack; he died as a result on September 11, 1947.
