= Joseph R. Calloway =

United States Army general

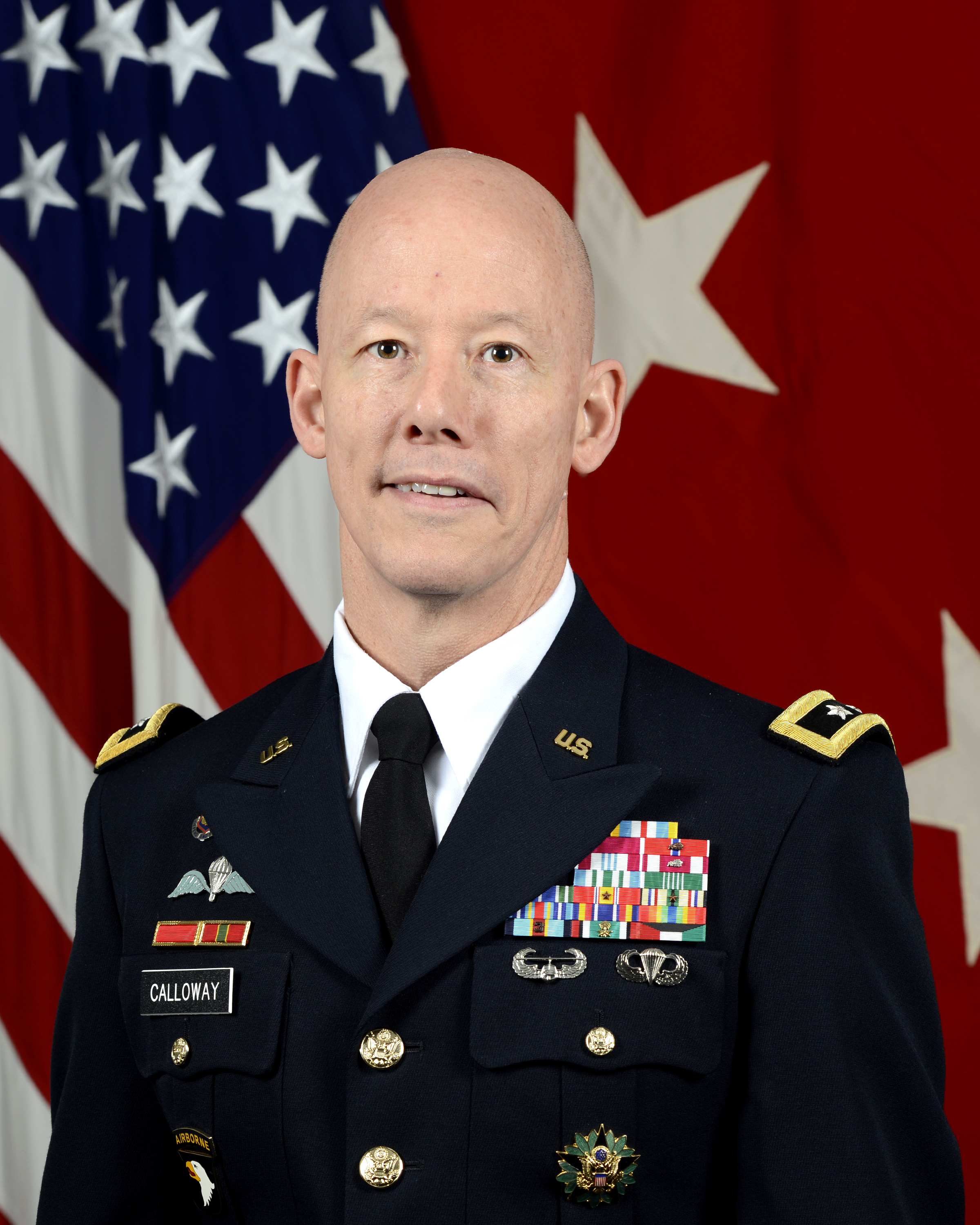
- Military career
- Allegiance: United States
- Branch: United States Army
- Service years: 1987–2021
- Rank: Major General

Joseph R. Calloway became the 25th Commanding General of the United States Army Human Resources Command (HRC), Fort Knox, Kentucky.

== Early life and education ==
Major General Joseph R. Calloway was commissioned in 1987 through the University of Central Florida ROTC program into the Adjutant General's (AG) Corps. He completed the U.S. Army Adjutant General Officer Basic Course (OBC) in 1988. He retired after relinquishing command of HRC to Brig. Gen. Thomas R. Drew on July 1, 2021. After retirement, Maj. Gen. Calloway made his home in Virginia.
