= 16th Military Police Brigade =

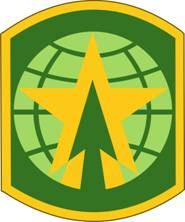
- Shoulder sleeve insignia
- Active: 20 May 1966–present
- Country: United States
- Branch: United States Army
- Role: Military Police
- Size: Brigade
- Part of: XVIII Airborne Corps
- Garrison/HQ: Fort Bragg
- Motto: One of a Kind
- Engagements: Vietnam War; Operation Urgent Fury; Operation Just Cause; Operation Desert Storm; Operation Enduring Freedom; Operation Iraqi Freedom
- Decorations: Meritorious Unit Commendation

Commanders
- Current commander: COL Craig A. Giancaterino
- Ceremonial chief: CSM Marcus Mitchell

Insignia
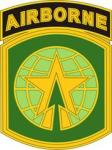
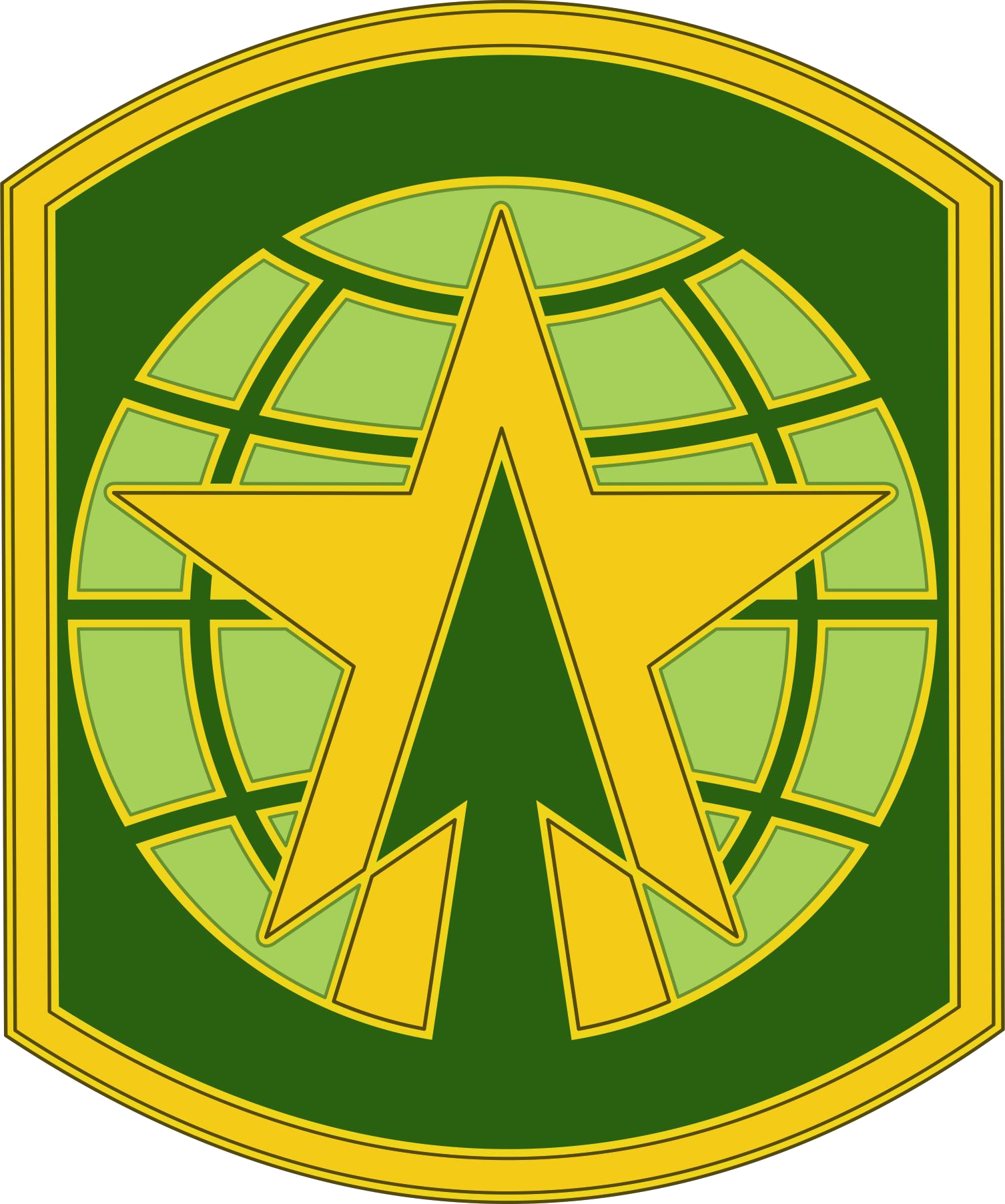
- Combat service identification badge with and without Airborne Tab

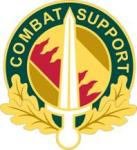
- Distinctive unit insignia of the brigade

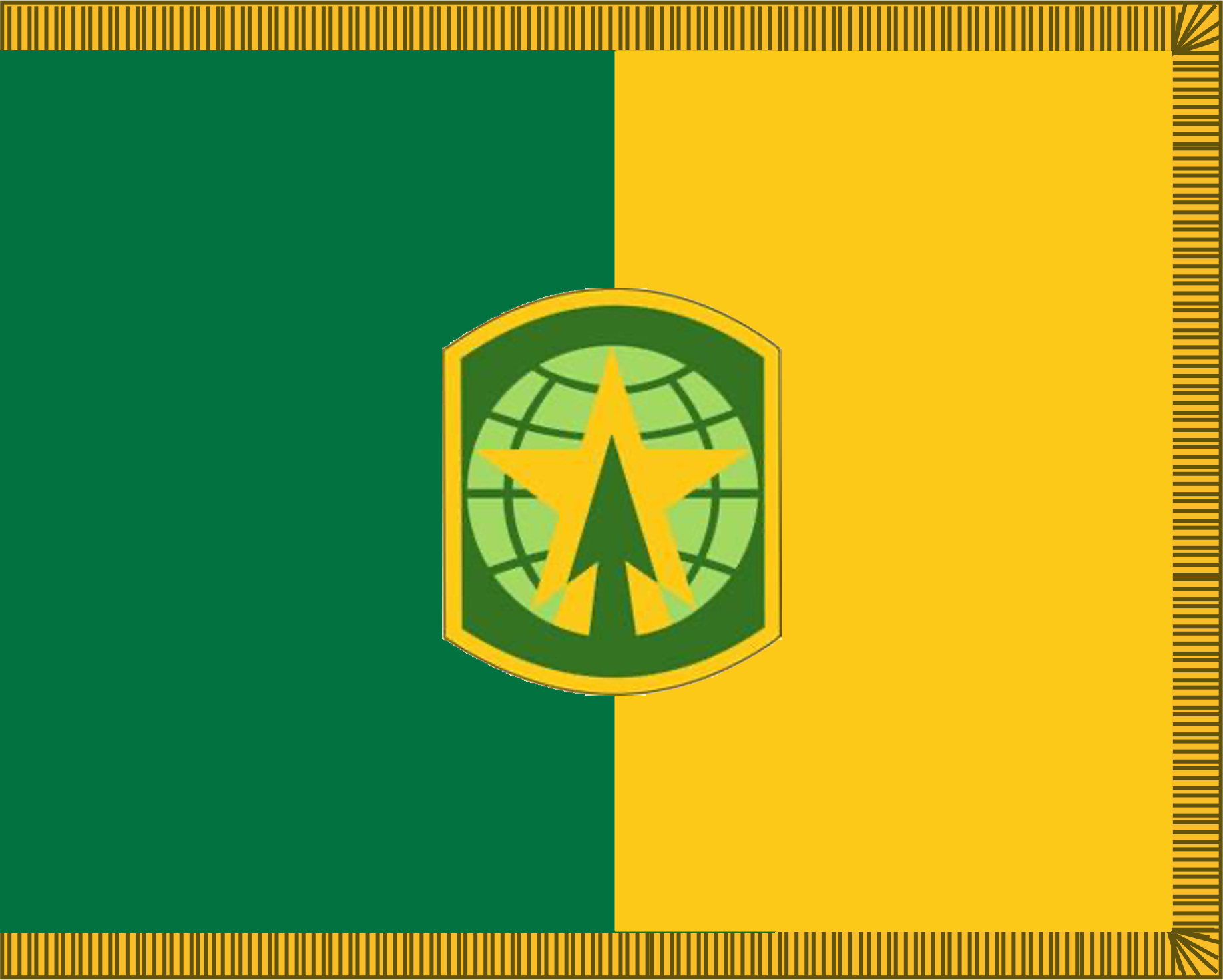
- 16th Military Police Brigade Flag

The 16th Military Police Brigade is a military police brigade of the United States Army headquartered at Fort Bragg, North Carolina. This brigade was the only airborne-qualified military police units in the U.S. Army, outside of the former 82nd MP Company of the 82nd Airborne Division. It provides security and protection support the XVIII Airborne Corps when deployed. As a brigade with organic airborne units, it is authorized a beret flash and parachute wing trimming, and the shoulder sleeve insignia was authorized to be worn with an airborne tab. According to U.S. Army's Institute of Heraldry, the shoulder sleeve insignia "was amended to delete the airborne tab effective 16 October 2008" when jump status of the brigade was terminated; in October 2025 the remaining units (503rd MP BN) lost their jump status but continue to wear the maroon beret worn by paratroopers in the U.S. Army.

== Insignia ==
Shoulder Insignia

Description

- On a dark green oblong arched at top and base a light green globe with dark green gridlines bearing a five pointed yellow star.

Symbolism

- Green and yellow are the colors used for Military Police, and a star is emblematic of that branch of service. A star also connotes leadership and authority. The arrowhead is a symbol for military preparedness and protection. All of the above, along with the globe, symbolize the overall mission capabilities, and operational sphere of the organization.

Distinctive Unit Insignia

Description

- A gold insignia consisting of a diagonal band divided throughout by a radiant partition line gold and scarlet, all within a green annulet, the upper part inscribed with the motto 'Combat Support' in gold letters and the lower part surmounted by two gold sprigs of oak leaves; overall an upright white sword.

Symbolism

- The sword surmounting the band of flames represents military justice overcoming the fires of conflict and violence. The design refers to the basic mission of the Military Police Corps, the maintenance of law and order. The white sword, used on the insignia of many U.S. Army organizations in Vietnam and the colors red and yellow from the Flag of the Republic of Vietnam stand for service in that country. The oak leaves are for strength and also allude to the state tree of Maryland where the unit was originally organized. The colors green and yellow are for the Military Police Corps.

== Lineage ==
- Constituted 1966-03-23 in the Regular Army as Headquarters and Headquarters Detachment, 16th Military Police Group
- Activated 1966-05-20 at Fort George G. Meade, Maryland
- Arrived in Vietnam on 1966-09-11, and was stationed at Nha Trang.
- Unit moved to Danang during October 1970.
- Unit returned to CONUS on 1970-12-20
- Reorganized and redesignated 1981-07-16 as Headquarters and Headquarters Company, 16th Military Police Brigade

== History ==
=== Vietnam War ===
The brigade dates back to the Vietnam War when it was constituted on 23 March 1966 as the 16th Military Police Group and activated on 20 May 1966 at Fort George G. Meade, Maryland. Shortly thereafter, the brigade deployed to Vietnam to help fight the Vietnam War. The Group provided command, control, staff planning, and coordination for military police units assigned and attached to the I and II Corps Tactical Zones.

The 93rd, 97th, 504th, 716th, and the 720th Military Police Battalions were under its control.

The unit participated in thirteen campaigns to include nine counteroffensives and two consolidations during the Vietnam War receiving two Meritorious Unit Commendations and the Republic Of Vietnam Cross Of Gallantry With Palm for their outstanding effort and dedication.

=== Cold War Era ===
On 16 July 1981 the group was reorganized and redesignated as the 16th Military Police Brigade (Airborne). Since Vietnam, the brigade headquarters has deployed around the world in support of XVIII Airborne Corps and on-going Army operations. In October 1983, the headquarters was sent to Grenada in support of Operation Urgent Fury. In March 1988, the brigade went to Panama in support of southern command's operation to secure US civilians and property and to protect the canal. In September 1989, the brigade was sent to Saint Croix in the US Virgin Islands to restore law and order and protect property following Hurricane Hugo. In December 1989, the brigade again went to Panama this time in support of Operation Just Cause and Promote Liberty during which the brigade was instrumental in standing up the Panamanian police force. in August 1990, the brigade deployed to Saudi Arabia and Kuwait in support of operations Desert Shield and Desert Storm. The brigade was later recognized for its hard work in the desert with their third Meritorious Unit Commendation. September 1992 the brigade went to Florida to assist in disaster relief following Hurricane Andrew. In September 1994, the brigade was sent to Haiti to support Operation Uphold Democracy.

=== War on Terrorism ===
In August 2006, the brigade deployed for 15 months to Iraq in support of Operation Iraqi Freedom where they were responsible for detainee operations and convoy security at Camp Bucca, along with detainee operations at The Baghdad Correctional Facility (Camp Cropper). The Unit also worked with Task Force 134 at Camp Victory in Baghdad, Iraq. The brigade was awarded its fourth Meritorious Unit Commendation for the outstanding mission accomplishments in Iraq.

The soldiers of the brigade have consistently been sent first to worldwide hot spots and crisis locations. Other operations that brigade units have supported were:

1. May 1981 Cuban Refugee Relief, Florida,
2. Civil disturbance operations at Seneca Army Depot, New York,
3. Rotations to the Sinai for multinational force and observers duty,
4. Presidential inaugurations,
5. Joint Task Force Bravo in Honduras, Somalia, Guantanamo Bay, Cuba, Bosnia, Kosovo,
6. Albanian refugee support at Fort Dix,
7. Pentagon security following the attacks of 11 September 2001,
8. Uzbekistan.

=== Afghanistan ===
The 91st MP battalion, 385th MP Battalion, and 503rd MP Battalion were deployed to Afghanistan, conducting operations in Kandahar and Nangarhar provinces. Unique to military police units, each battalion contains a Military Working Dog Detachment, which certifies military working dog teams to help support both MP and non-MP units worldwide.

=== Army Transformation ===
The 91st, 385th, 519th, and 716th MP battalions dissolved or reorganized as part of the Army Structure (ARSTRUC) of 2024. The only remaining combat battalion assigned to the brigade is the 503rd MP Battalion, which lost its jump status in October 2025 but soldiers continue to wear the maroon beret. MPs at Fort Bragg, NC that conduct law enforcement for the garrison were reassigned to the Law Enforcement Company, XVIII Airborne Corps; but are still administered by the brigade and 503rd MP Battalion with changes expected in FY 2027. Soldiers assigned to the Fort Bragg LEC wear the SSI of the XVIII Airborne Corps.

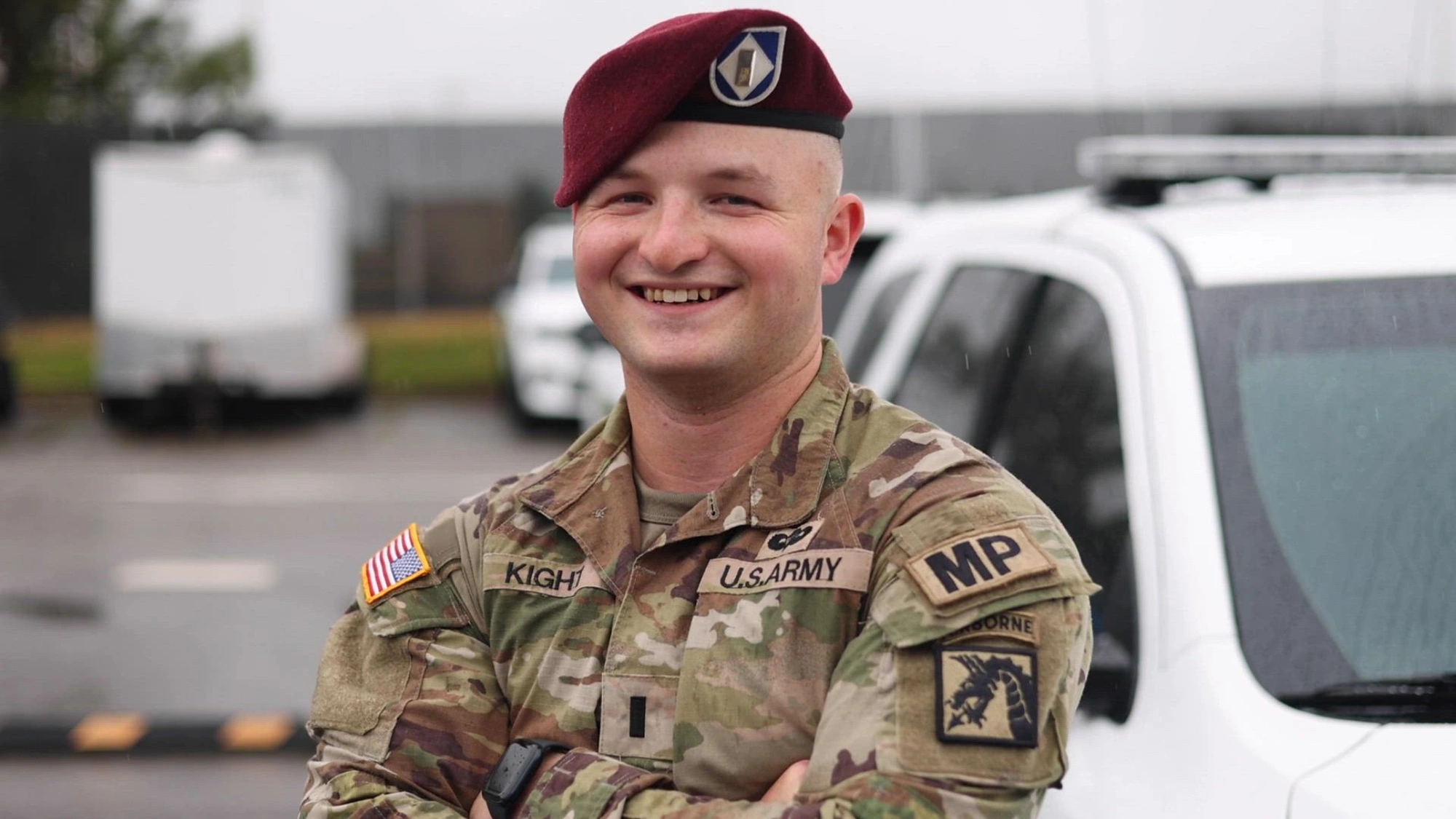
Fort Bragg Law Enforcement Center officer

== Units ==
- Headquarters and Headquarters Company
- 503rd Military Police Battalion (Airborne) – Fort Bragg
- 550th Military Working Dog Detachment - Fort Bragg

== Honors ==
=== Campaign participation credit ===
- Vietnam:
1. Summer-Fall 1969;
2. Winter-Spring 1970;
3. Counteroffensive, Phase II 1966–1967;
4. Counteroffensive, Phase III 1966–1967;
5. Tet Counteroffensive 1968;
6. Counteroffensive, Phase IV 1968;
7. Counteroffensive, Phase V 1968;
8. Counteroffensive, Phase VI 1968–1969;
9. Tet/69 Counteroffensive 1969;
10. Sanctuary Counteroffensive 1970;
11. Counteroffensive, Phase VII 1970–1971;
12. Consolidation I 1971–1972;
13. Consolidation II 1971–1972
- Armed Forces Expeditions:
1. Panama 1989–1990
2. Southwest Asia:
  1. Defense of Saudi Arabia 1990–1991;
  2. Liberation and Defense of Kuwait 1990–1993
3. Iraq:
  1. Transition Time 2003–2004;
  2. Iraqi Governance 2004–2005;
  3. National Resolution 2005–2007;
  4. Iraq Surge 2007–2008
4. Afghanistan:
  1. Consolidation II 2006–2009;
  2. Consolidation III 2009–2011
- Contingencies
1. Panama – Law and order 1989–1990
2. Saint Croix – Hurricane Relief
3. Florida – Hurricane Relief
4. Haiti – Operation Uphold Democracy
5. Africa – Operation United Assistance 2014–2015 (194th MP CMBT SPT CO.)
6. Afghanistan - Operation Allies Refuge 2021

=== Decorations ===
1. Meritorious Unit Commendation for VIETNAM 1966–1968
2. Meritorious Unit Commendation for VIETNAM 1968–1969
3. Meritorious Unit Commendation for SOUTHWEST ASIA
4. Meritorious Unit Commendation for IRAQ 2004–2005
5. Meritorious Unit Commendation for IRAQ 2006–2007
6. Meritorious Unit Commendation for AFGHANISTAN 2009–2010
7. Republic of Vietnam Cross of Gallantry with Palm for VIETNAM 1966–1971
8. Presidential_Unit_Citation_(United_States) Presidential Unit Citation for AFGHANISTAN 2021
