= United States Army Provost Marshal General =

U.S. Army staff position responsible for investigations of Army personnel

Provost Marshal of the United States Army
- Army Staff Identification Badge

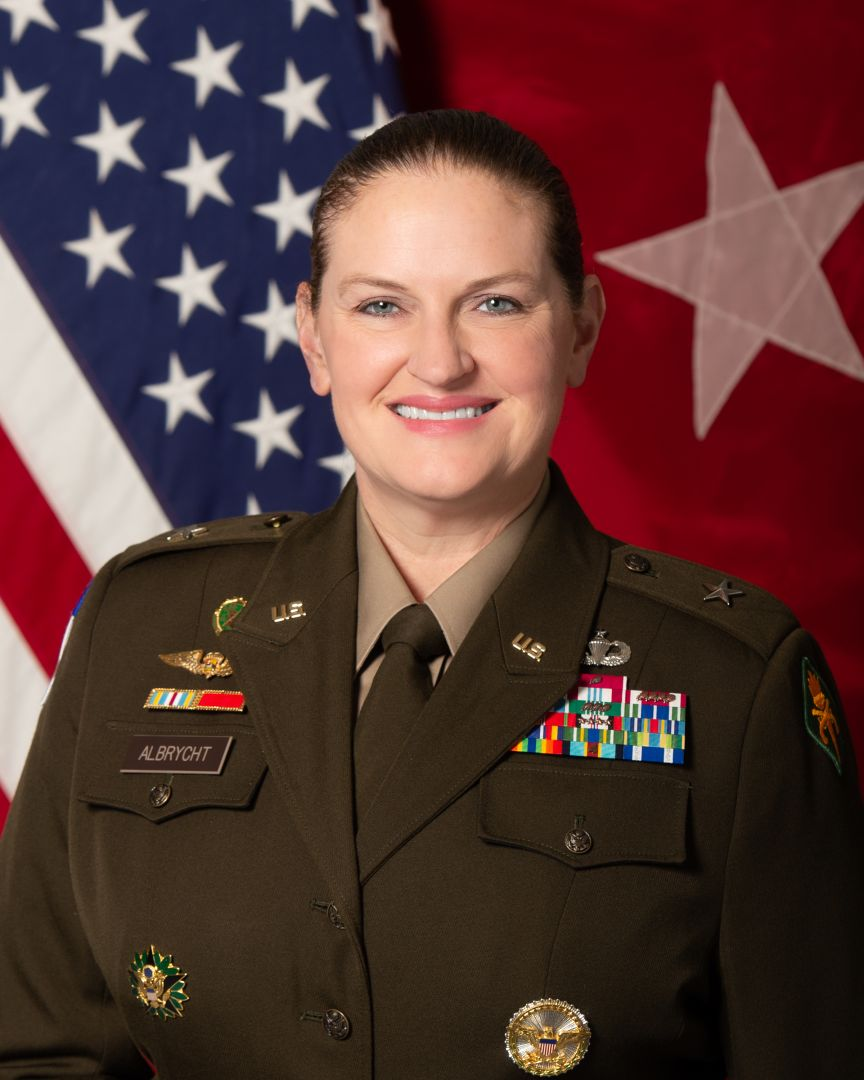
- Incumbent; BG Sarah K. Albrycht since June 18, 2024
- Department of the Army
- Reports to: Chief of Staff of the Army
- Formation: January 10, 1776
- First holder: CPT William Marony
- Website: Official Website

The provost marshal general is a United States Army staff position that handles investigations of U.S. Army personnel. It is the highest-ranking provost marshal position in the U.S. Army, reporting to the chief of staff of the United States Army. The position brings all aspects of law enforcement in the U.S. Army in a single office.

The role has been used off and on since 1776 (usually in periods of war time). After being discontinued in 1974 at the end of the Vietnam War, it was resurrected on January 30, 2003, following the September 11 attacks.

It is responsible for:

- United States Army Military Police Corps (USAMPC) (since 2003)
- United States Army Corrections Command (ACC) (since 2007)

Prior to its most recent organization, the responsibilities of this position were scattered across various army units.

== History ==
=== American Revolutionary War ===
William Marony was the first provost marshal general, appointed by George Washington on January 10, 1776. His principal job was maintaining jails and supervising 40 executions. Nine men served as provost marshal general until 1778 when the duties were transferred to the Marechausse Corps. Service ended at the end of the war.

=== American Civil War ===
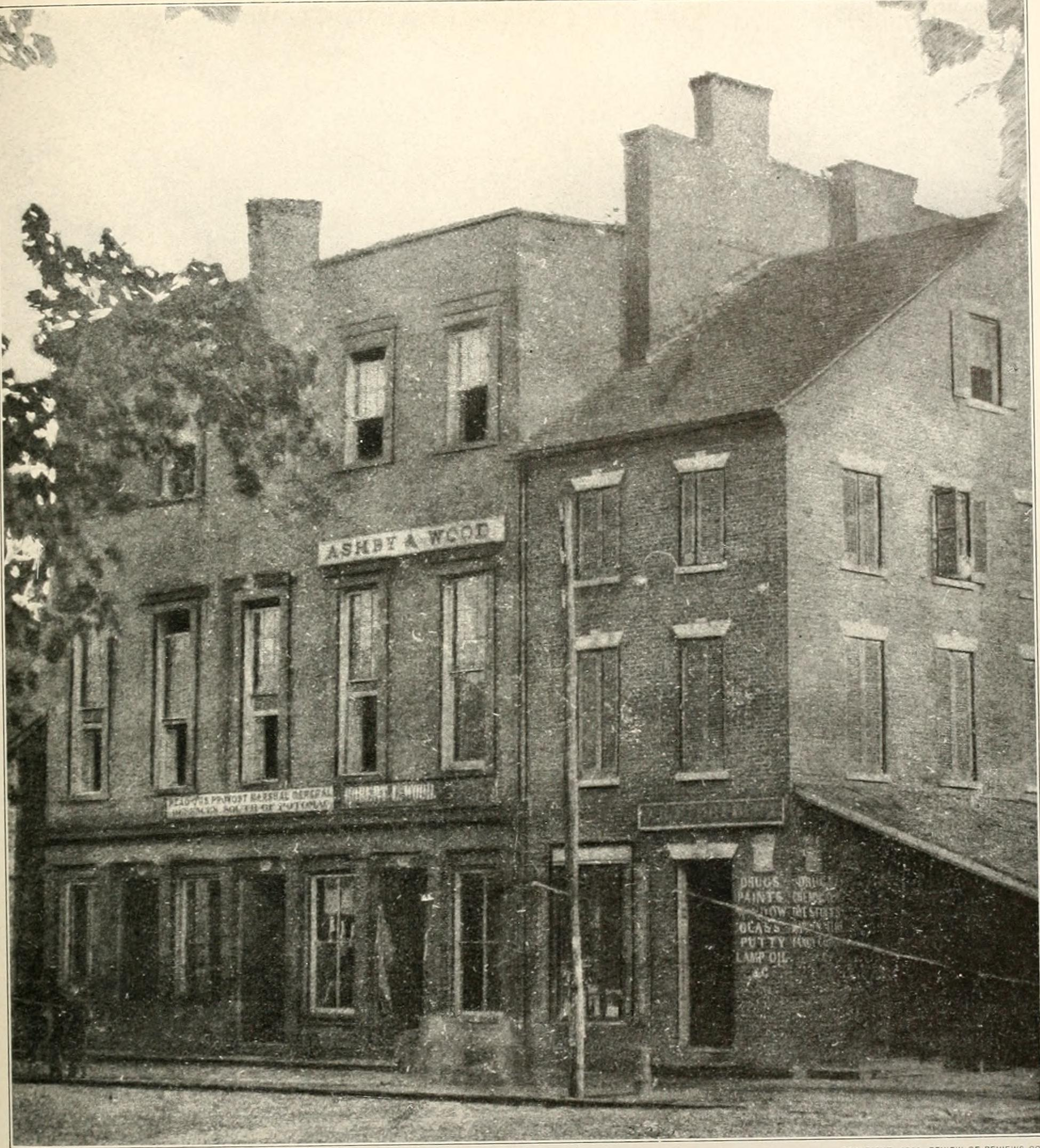
Headquarters of Provost Marshal General, Defenses South of the Potomac

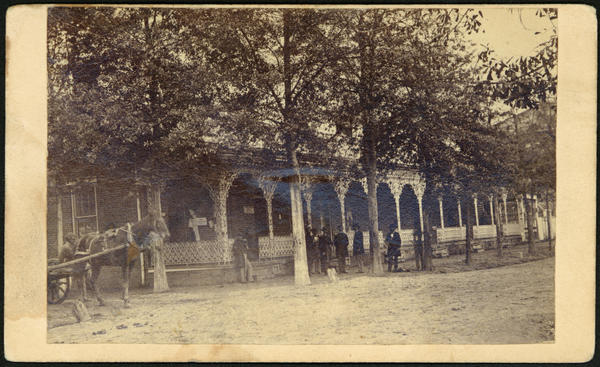
A visibly whip-scarred contraband named Peter was likely photographed at the Provost-Marshal's office in Baton Rouge, pictured here in 1863 photograph ascribed to McPherson & Oliver

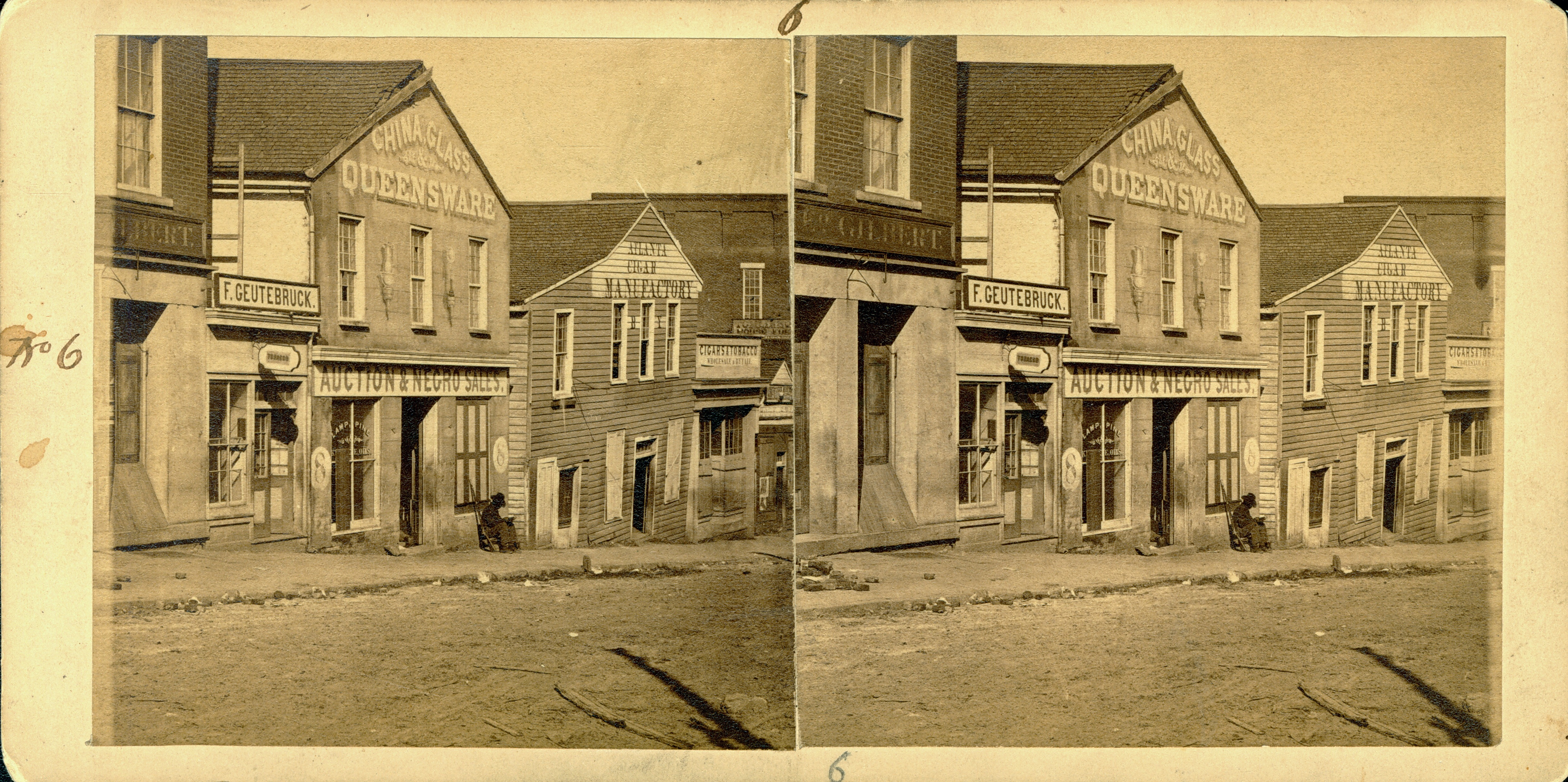
A note on the back of this George N. Barnard stereographic view depicting the former Crawford, Frazer & Co. slave market in Atlanta reads "No 6 View in Atlanta: Novr/64 - On Whitehall St. Ex negro-mart, used as U. S. Prov. Marshal's office"

James B. Fry was appointed on March 3, 1863, to be the first provost marshal general during the American Civil War. The office dealt with recruitment and desertion issues. It also supervised the Invalid Corps, in which disabled soldiers performed garrison duty (as opposed to field duty). The position was abolished in 1866. An 1866 proposal to reorganize the Army to include a Provost Marshal's Bureau "consisting of a Provost Marshal General with the rank, pay and emoluments of a Brigadier General and an Assistant Provost Marshal General with the rank, pay and emoluments of a Colonel of Cavalry" was rejected on the grounds "that it creates an unnecessary office for an undeserving public servant".

=== Spanish–American War ===
Arthur MacArthur Jr. was appointed provost marshal general of Manila in July 1901 to provide law enforcement in Manila and the provinces. The position was abolished after about a year.

=== World War I ===
Enoch Crowder was appointed provost marshal general in July 1917 with the Provost Marshal General's Office focusing on enforcing the Selective Service System. In World War I, over 24,000,000 men filled out P.M.G.O. Form 1 Registration Cards for the military draft. During the American Expeditionary Force, provost marshal generals oversaw military police, prisoner of war, criminal investigation, and circulation in Europe. Among the European marshals were Hanson E. Ely, William H. Allaire, John C. Groome III, and Harry Hill Bandholtz. The European component was dissolved in 1919, and the provost marshal general remained an advisor to the War Department until 1927.

=== World War II ===
The Basic Field Manual in 1937 outlined the position when it was reactivated. Allen W. Gullion was appointed in 1941. Its duties initially were to control enemy aliens but were later expanded to security clearance investigations and Military police. After 1943. it was responsible for prisoner-of-war camps in the United States as well as Japanese-American relocation camps. Toward the end of the war it began investigating crimes, apprehending deserters, and handling the War Crimes Division of the Judge Advocate General's Office.

=== Post World War II ===
Gullion remained until April 1944 when he was succeeded by Archer L. Lerch, Blackshear M. Bryan in 1945, Edwin P. Parker Jr. in 1948, William H. Maglin in 1953, and Haydon L. Boatner in 1957.

=== Vietnam War ===
Ralph J. Butchers was appointed in 1960 followed by Carl C. Turner in 1964, Karl W. Gustafson in 1968 and finally Lloyd B. Ramsey in 1970 until the office was abolished on May 20, 1974.

=== War on Terror ===
After the start of Operation Iraqi Freedom, the position of provost marshal general was recreated and filled by a Major General or Brigadier General.

== In popular culture ==
Sean Connery starred as Lt. Colonel Alan Caldwell, the base provost marshal, in The Presidio.

== List of provost marshals general ==
Here is the list of provost marshals general:

	Name	Photo	Term began	Term ended
1.	MG Allen W. Gullion		July 31, 1941	April 27, 1944
2.	MG Archer L. Lerch		May, 1944	July 17, 1945
3.	MG Blackshear M. Bryan		July 17, 1945	April 9, 1948
4.	MG Edwin P. Parker Jr.		April 10, 1948	February 4, 1953
5.	MG William H. Maglin		February 5, 1953	September, 1957
6.	MG Haydon L. Boatner		November 19, 1957	October 31, 1960
7.	MG Ralph J. Butchers		December 1, 1960	July 1, 1964
8.	MG Carl C. Turner		July 1, 1964	September 30, 1968
9.	MG Karl W. Gustafson		September 30, 1968	July 14, 1970
10.	MG Lloyd B. Ramsey		July 14, 1970	May 20, 1974
Position abolished on May 20, 1974
11.	MG Donald J. Ryder		October 29, 2003	July 14, 2006
12.	BG Rodney L. Johnson		July 14, 2006	January 15, 2010
13.	BG Colleen L. McGuire		January 15, 2010	September 28, 2011
14.	MG David E. Quantock		September 28, 2011	October 27, 2014
15.	MG Mark S. Inch		October 27, 2014	May, 2017
16.	MG David P. Glaser		May 2017	June 24, 2019
17.	MG Kevin Vereen		June 24, 2019	July 2020
18.	MG Donna W. Martin		July 2020	August 5, 2021
19.	MG Duane R. Miller		August 5, 2021	June 18, 2024
20.	BG Sarah K. Albrycht		June 18, 2024	Incumbent

== See also ==
- Provost Marshal Office (United States Marine Corps)
- Masters-at-Arms (United States Navy)
- United States Air Force Security Forces
- USADIP
