= United States Army Corrections Command =

U.S. Army command with oversight of worldwide Army Corrections System

- Founded: 2007–present
- Country: United States
- Branch: United States Army
- Type: Command
- Garrison/HQ: Fort Leavenworth, KS

Commanders
- Provost Marshal General of the Army: BG Sarah K. Albrycht
- Command Sergeant Major: CSM Shawn A. Klosterman

Insignia
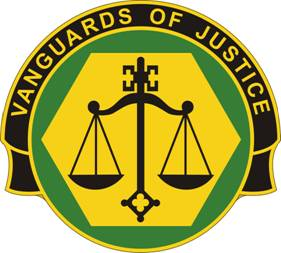
- Distinctive unit insignia

The United States Army Corrections Command (ACC) exercises command and control and operational oversight for policy, programming, resourcing, and support of Army Corrections System (ACS) facilities and TDA elements worldwide.

On order, ACC coordinates the execution of condemned military prisoners.

== History ==
Prior to its establishment in 2007, prisons operated under the U.S. Army Training and Doctrine Command, U.S. Army Forces Command, U.S. Army Europe, and U.S. Forces Korea.

On 2 October 2007, the US Army Corrections Command (ACC) was established as a Field Operating Agency (FOA) under the Operational Control of the United States Army Provost Marshal General, Department of the Army. It was then headquartered in Arlington, Virginia.

In April 2023, ACC was established as a Direct Reporting Unit (DRU) to Headquarters, Department of the Army. Its headquarters was moved to Fort Leavenworth, KS.

The Army Corrections Command exercises command and control, operational oversight, and support of the ACS. ACS facilities are located at the following installations: Fort Leavenworth, Joint Base Lewis-McChord, Sembach Kaserne USAREUR, and Camp Humphreys USFK.

The assistant secretary of the Army (manpower and reserve affairs) (ASA) (M&RA) exercises Army secretary oversight for Army Corrections, parole and clemency functions.

ACC will standardize, eliminate command layers and streamline corrections operations across the Army.

== Army Corrections Command Facilities ==
- United States Disciplinary Barracks at Fort Leavenworth, Kansas
- Northwest Joint Regional Correctional Facility at Joint Base Lewis-McChord, Washington
- Midwest Joint Regional Correctional Facility at Fort Leavenworth
- United States Army Corrections Facility-Europe at Sembach Kaserne, Germany
- United States Army Corrections Facility-Korea at Camp Humphreys, South Korea

As of 2007, it managed 1,700 civilian and military personnel, 2,300 military prisoners in military and Federal Bureau of Prisons facilities or on mandatory supervised release or parole.

== Prisoner operations ==
Prisoner uniforms for regular post-trial male inmates include brown shirts and trousers. Male trustee prisoners in the minimum and medium custodies wear special blue shirt and trouser uniforms. Maximum custody male prisoners wear orange jumpsuits. Pre-trial male prisoners wear tan-colored shirts and trousers. Female pre-trial and post-trial prisoners wear light blue shirt and trouser uniforms. Headgear consists of orange watch caps and orange ball caps. During "cold weather" periods, prisoners wear brown coats. The USDB will determine the uniforms of death penalty prisoners. The ACC said that this is the case because of "the uniqueness of this category of prisoner."

== See also ==
- Military Justice
- Uniform Code of Military Justice
- United States Army
- Corrections Officer
- Corrections
- Thomas F. Barr Award
