= United States Army Criminal Investigation Division =

Federal law enforcement agency of the United States

Department of the Army Criminal Investigation Division
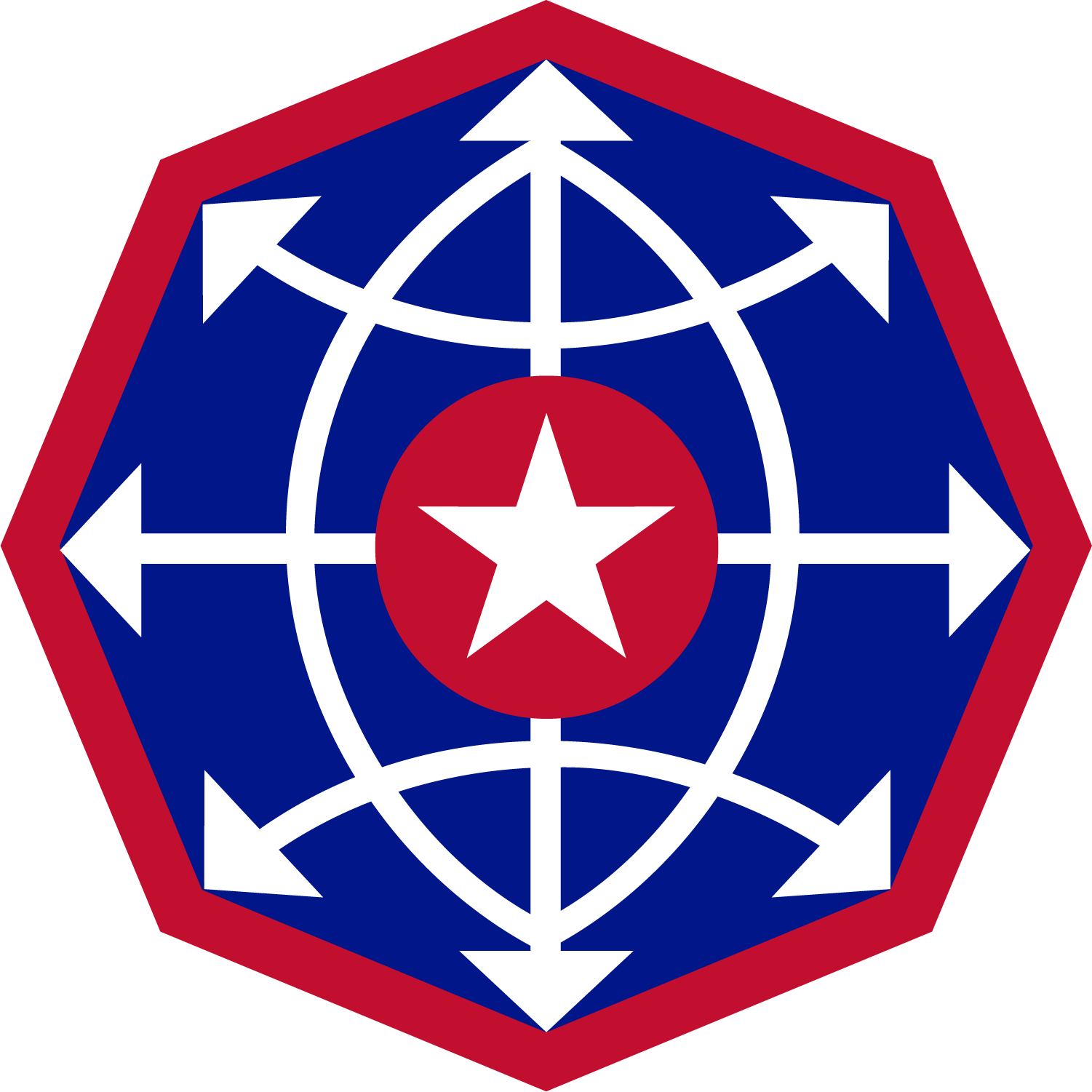
- Army CID Combat Service ID Badge

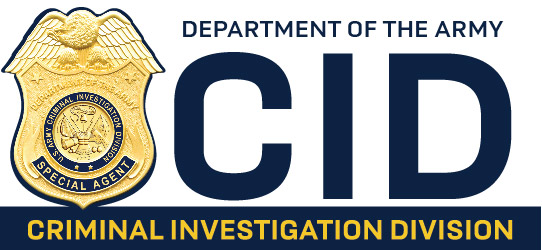
- Logo of the Criminal Investigation Division

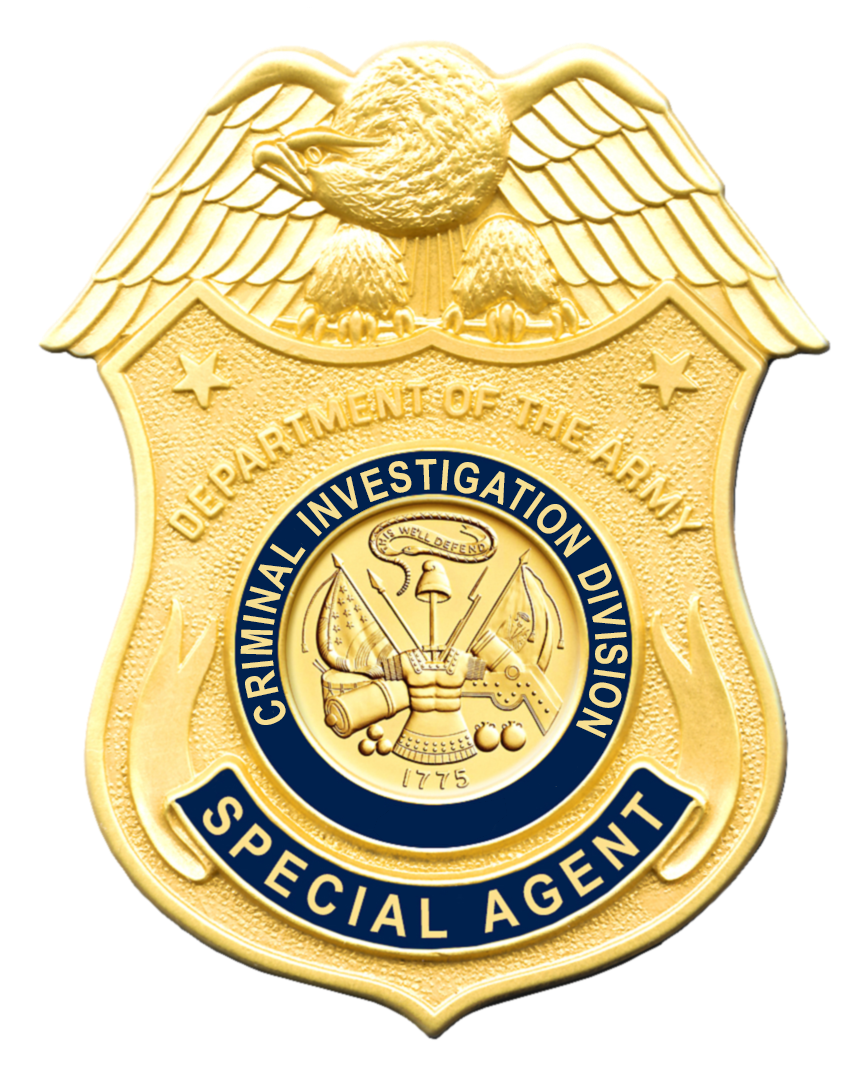
- Badge of an Army CID Special Agent

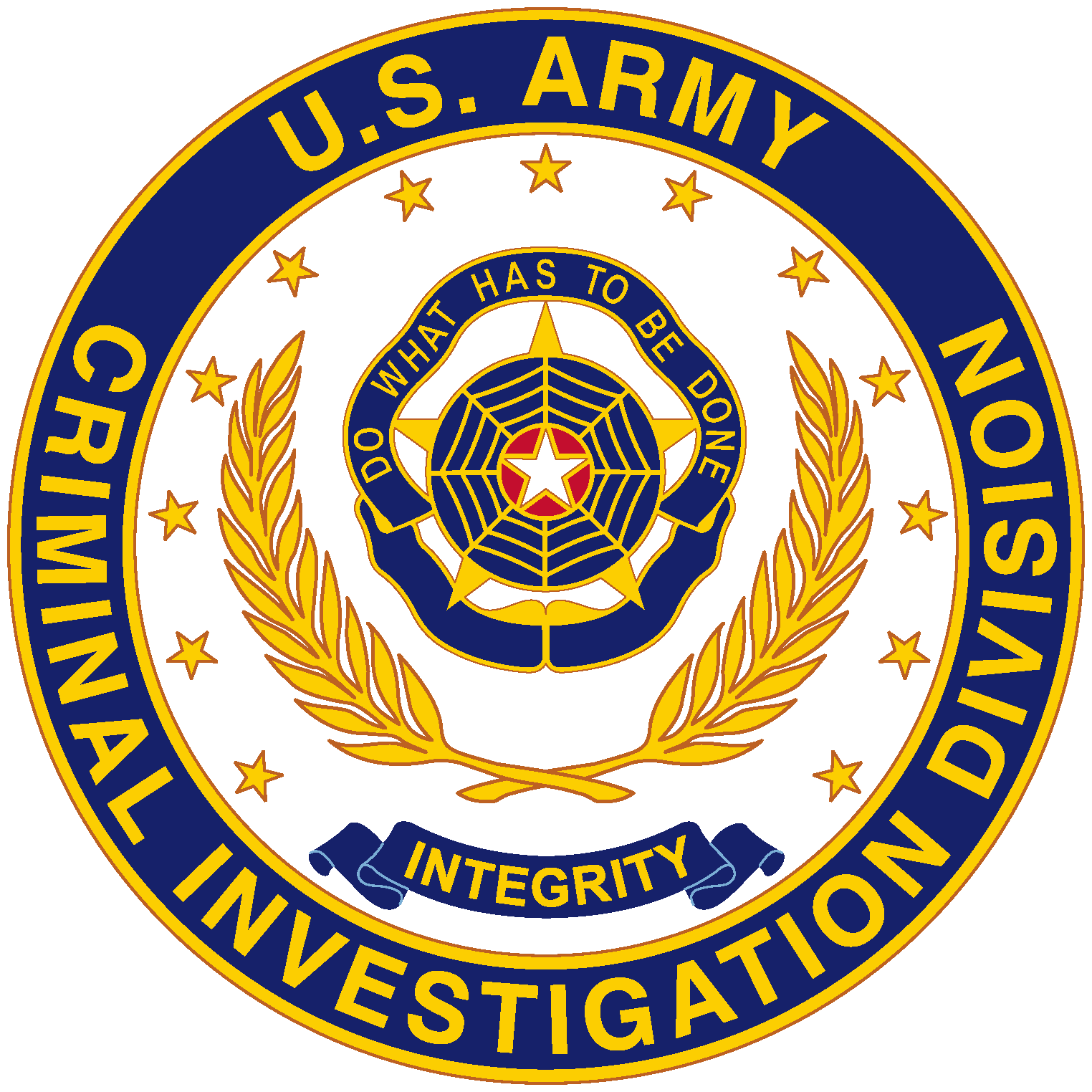
- Seal of the Criminal Investigation Division
- Abbreviation: CID, DACID
- Motto: "Do What Has To Be Done"

Agency overview
- Formed: 17 September 1971
- Employees: 4,000

Jurisdictional structure
- Federal agency: United States
- Operations jurisdiction: United States
- General nature: Federal law enforcement

Operational structure
- Headquarters: Quantico, Virginia, U.S.
- Special Agents: 2000
- Agency executives: Scott L. Moreland, Director; Peter J. Tolentino, Deputy Director
- Parent agency: Department of the Army
- Child agency: Protective Services Battalion
- Directorates: List: US Army Criminal Investigation Laboratory; US Army Crime Records Center

Website
- cid.army.mil

The United States Department of the Army Criminal Investigation Division (CID or DACID), previously known as the United States Army Criminal Investigation Command (USACIDC), is the primary federal law enforcement agency of the United States Department of the Army. Its primary function is to investigate felony crimes and serious violations of military law and the United States Code within the US Army. The division is an independent federal law enforcement agency with investigative autonomy; CID special agents, both military and civilian, report through the CID chain of command to the CID director, who reports directly to the under secretary of the Army and the secretary of the Army. Unlike their counterparts at OSI and NCIS, Army CID does not have primary counterintelligence responsibilities, as this jurisdiction resides with United States Army Counterintelligence Command (ACIC).

USACIDC was established as a United States Army command in 1971 and is headquartered at Marine Corps Base, Quantico, Virginia. Worldwide, the organization has slightly fewer than 3,000 soldiers and civilians, of whom approximately 900 are special agents. The initialism "USACIDC" was used to refer to the Army command itself, while criminal investigation personnel and operations are commonly referred to using the shortened initialism "CID", which has its history in the original Criminal Investigation Division formed during World War I. The name restoration to Criminal Investigation Division became official after 2021 reform.

== History ==
During World War I, General John J. Pershing ordered the creation of a separate organization within the Military Police Corps to prevent and detect crime among the American Expeditionary Force in France. The newly created Criminal Investigation Division (CID) was headed by a division chief who served as the advisor to the Provost Marshal General on all matters relating to criminal investigations. However, operational control of CID still remained with individual provost marshals, and there was no central control of investigative efforts within the organization, resulting in limitations. At the end of the war, the United States Army was reduced in size during the transition to peacetime and the size of CID shrank dramatically.

With the United States' entry into World War II in December 1941, the armed forces rapidly swelled in size and the Army once again became a force of millions, and the need for a self-policing law enforcement system rematerialized. However, by early 1942, investigations of crimes committed by military personnel were still considered to be a "command function" to be conducted by local military police personnel. The Office of The Provost Marshal General felt that the agents in the Investigations Department were not properly trained for criminal investigations, the only investigations taking place at the time being personnel security background investigations for individuals being considered for employment in defense industries. As the Army had expanded, the crime rate had risen, and local commanders did not have the personnel or resources to conduct adequate investigations. By December 1943, the Provost Marshal General was charged with providing staff supervision over all criminal investigations, and a month later in January 1944, the Criminal Investigation Division was reestablished under the Provost Marshal General's Office. The organization exercised supervision over criminal investigation activities, coordinated investigations between commands, dictated plans and policies, and set standards for criminal investigators.

After the war, the CID was once again decentralized, with control of criminal investigations transferred to area commands in the 1950s and further down to the installation level in the 1960s. A Department of Defense study in 1964 entitled Project Security Shield made clear that complete recentralization of the Army's criminal investigative effort was needed in order to produce a more efficient and responsive worldwide capability. Beginning in 1965, criminal investigative elements were reorganized into CID groups corresponding to geographical areas in the United States. In 1966, the concept was introduced to units in Europe and the Far East. However, this arrangement did not fully resolve all the coordination problems, and in 1969, the U.S. Army Criminal Investigation Agency was established to supervise all CID operations worldwide.

As the agency did not have command authority, in March 1971, Secretary of Defense Melvin Laird directed the secretary of the Army to form a CID command with command and control authority over all Army-wide CID assets. On 17 September 1971, the United States Army Criminal Investigation Command was established as a major Army command, vested with command and control of all CID activities and resources worldwide.

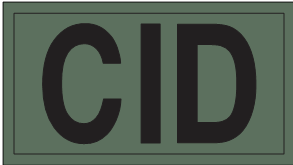
US Army CID OCP Brassard Patch

In 2020, the high profile murder of Vanessa Guillén at Fort Hood raised concerns related to the capabilities, experience, and resourcing of the Command. The Fort Hood Independent Review Committee (FHIRC) issued a finding that Fort Hood CID investigators assigned to their cases were hampered by a checklist mentality from their beginnings as junior investigators straight out of initial training in Fort Leonard Wood. The majority of CID investigators were then detailed to protective services for senior Pentagon officials, thereby moving straight to middle management CID positions without the requisite experience in criminal investigation. The Provost Marshal is using the FHIRC report as a guide for reforming the CID. Army Senior Leaders called for the transformation of the organization and authority over the agency was transferred from the provost marshal general to a civilian director reporting to the under secretary of the Army.

On 17 September 2021, the 50th anniversary of the establishment of the agency, Special Agent Gregory D. Ford, formerly the Deputy Director of Operations for the Naval Criminal Investigative Service, assumed responsibility as the first civilian director. Furthermore, it was also announced that the Criminal Investigation Command was being renamed the Criminal Investigation Division, the name which was first associated with the organization in 1918.

=== Fort Hood Report ===
An independent review of Fort Hood in 2020 found that the command climate at Fort Hood is "permissive" of sexual assault and harassment while the Army-wide effort to address the problem is "structurally flawed." The panel's report stands as a searing indictment of the Army's Sexual Harassment/Assault Response and Prevention (SHARP) program, both specifically at Fort Hood and broadly across the Army.

Following the fallout of the Fort Hood Report, a historical reorganization was announced in 2021, which will result in a civilian director, separation from the Military Police chain of command, credentialed military officers assigned to CID with specialized investigative training and less protective details to allow agents more time to hone their skills. The report found that the Army investigators tasked with reviewing complex crimes at Fort Hood were vastly inexperienced, overwhelmed and understaffed, resulting in failures to protect service members and their families.

== Selection and training ==
CID is not accepting any military applications as of 2022. The only hiring path is through federal civil service and their job postings are advertised via USAjobs.gov. In the past, Military Special Agent candidates must be currently serving in the active Army or Army Reserve. There are no active Army National Guard CID units. Candidates must be enlisted soldiers who are US citizens, at least 21 years of age, and in the ranks of SPC-SGT or SSG with less than 12 months time in grade, and a graduate of the Basic Leader Course (BLC). Candidates must have had at least two years of military service, but not more than 12, at least one year of military police experience or two years of civilian law enforcement experience and a minimum of 60 college credit hours. Other requirements include (but are not limited to) credit checks, no physical limitation, and have the ability to deploy worldwide, normal color vision, the ability to obtain a Top Secret clearance, a drivers license and no history of mental or emotional disorders. Some requirements may be waived.

To qualify for Warrant Officer positions, candidates must be at least a Sergeant/E-5, currently serving as a Special Agent, with two years of investigative experience with CID, have a Top Secret clearance and a bachelor's degree (waiverable). Candidates must have also demonstrated leadership potential, management abilities and good communication skills.

CID rarely employed Commissioned Officers as Special Agents. For decades standard Commissioned Officers in the 31A MOS (Military Police Officer) served as Commanders of CID Battalions and Groups, but due to the recent restructuring of the agency these positions have evolved. Criminal investigations are conducted by field Special Agents and are typically supervised by senior Special Agents.

Civilian Special Agents are 1811 federal criminal investigators and sworn federal agents. These agents have both military authority to enforce violations of the Uniform Code of Military Justice (UCMJ) and federal statutory authority (Title 10 U.S.C. Section 7377) to enforce all federal laws anywhere in the United States. After the 2021 reforms following the Fort Hood Independent Review Committee, CID began to increase its numbers of civilian special agents when compared to military special agents, intended to increase CID's investigative experience and help the command build better partnerships with local and regional law enforcement, as military special agents can be moved between posts after a few years of service, severing all professional contact between the different law enforcement agencies.

All civilian CID special agents are trained at the Federal Law Enforcement Training Center (FLETC) in Glynco, Georgia. First attending the Criminal Investigator Training Program (CITP) along with their fellow 1811 partners from participating federal agencies and then a 2 month CID specific training course to familiarize themselves with agency policy and procedure. Following the completion of CID Basic Special Agent Course, 1811 Special Agents will return to their duty station for a Field Agent Training program. The Field Agent Training program will immerse the newly appointed 1811 to military criminal investigations and how to apply lessons learned at FLETC to the job.

Military Special Agent candidates initially receive training at the US Army Military Police School (USAMPS) at Fort Leonard Wood where they attend the CID Special Agent Course. Later, agents may return to USAMPS to attend specialized training in Advanced Crime Scenes, Sexual Assault Investigations, Child Abuse Prevention and Investigative Techniques, and Protective Service Training as well as other subjects.

== Mission ==
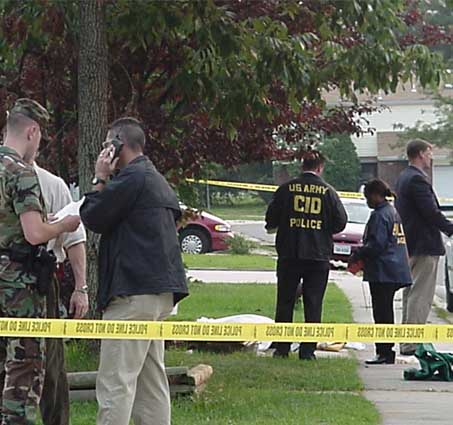
CID at a crime scene

The primary mission of the CID, according to the organization's website, is to:

- Investigate serious felony level crime (murder, rape, kidnapping, child abuse, drug trafficking, weapons smuggling, etc.)
- Conduct sensitive and/or serious investigations
- Collect, analyze and disseminate criminal intelligence
- Conduct protective service operations
- Provide forensic laboratory support
- Maintain Army criminal records

Additionally, CID may perform the following special missions:

- Perform logistical security, from manufacturers to soldiers on the battlefield
- Develop criminal intelligence to develop countermeasures to combat subversive activities on the battlefield
- Criminal investigations to include war crimes and in some cases crimes against coalition forces and host nation personnel
- Protective service operations for key personnel on and off the battlefield

The division does not charge individuals with crimes; instead, DACID investigates allegations and turns official findings over to the appropriate command and legal authority for disposition and adjudication. DACID exercises jurisdiction over military personnel who are suspected of offenses under the Uniform Code of Military Justice, as well as civilian personnel when there is probable cause to believe the person has committed an offense under the criminal laws of the United States with a nexus to the Department of Defense. CID Special Agents may be military personnel (NCOs or Warrant Officers), or sworn civilian personnel.

Within the United States Army, DACID has exclusive jurisdiction in the investigation of all serious, felony level crimes, and assist with the investigation of certain national security crimes such as espionage, treason, and certain aspects of international terrorism. Investigative jurisdiction within the Army of these crimes resides with U.S. Army Counterintelligence (ACI), although joint and parallel investigations can and do happen depending on specific circumstances (most commonly with terrorism investigations).

== Uniform ==
CID Special Agents do not wear uniforms for anything other than official military training. For official photographs, and certain duty assignments, they wear the uniforms, rank and insignia of any other soldier of their respective ranks. The design of the shoulder sleeve insignia has the central star and the lines of latitude and longitude suggesting a globe. Together with the arrowheads, they mark the points of a compass, symbolizing the basic worldwide mission of the command: To perform and exercise centralized command authority, direction and control of Army criminal investigation activities worldwide. Red, white, and blue are the national colors. The CID distinctive unit insignia has a central star symbolizing centralized command. The grid lines allude to the latitude lines of the globe, thus referring to the worldwide activities of the organization. The grid lines also suggest a stylized web, with eight sides representing the original eight geographical regions of the command. The web, a symbol of criminal apprehension, is the result of methodical construction alluding to the scientific methods of criminal investigations. The outer points of the star further symbolize far-reaching authority. Red, white, and blue, are the national colors and gold is symbolic of achievement.

As criminal investigators, CID Special Agents typically dress in civilian clothing which range from professional suits, business/casual attire, or comfortable clothing when appropriate for their daily investigative responsibilities. Due to the nature of their work, undercover assignments dictate further variations of attire to support specific undercover mission requirements. In the case of active-duty agents, they wear Army Combat Uniforms (ACUs) as the regular combat and field uniform, along with the Army Green Service Uniform (AGSU) as the in-garrison uniform, and the Army Service Uniform (ASU) for formal occasions. For the ACU, agents sometimes wear "CID" brassards on their upper left arms. For wear with the ASU and AGSU, Military Police branch insignia pins and distinctive unit insignia are worn, representing the CID's origins in and relationship with the Military Police Corps.

== Firearms ==
Some CID Special Agents carry an alternate duty weapon, which can be a variety of double action semi-automatic pistols chambered in 9 mm, .40 caliber, or .45 caliber. CID Special Agents are issued the M18 in 9mm. It is similar to a SIG Sauer P320 sidearm. The M11 or SIG Sauer P228 is no longer issued. Agents are also issued the M4A1 Carbine or shortened version, MK18, for protection missions and routine carry during enforcement related duties including when deployed overseas to war zones. Agents also have the B&T APC9K sub-machine gun.

== Commanders ==
The following is a list of former and current CID commanders:

N°	Portrait	Name	Term
Commander, Army Criminal Investigation Command
1		COL Henry H. Tufts	September 1971 – August 1974 (2 years and 11 months)
Commanding General, Army Criminal Investigation Command
2	N/A	MG Albert R. Escola	August 1974 – September 1975 (1 year and 1 month)
3	N/A	MG Paul M. Timmerberg	September 1975 – September 1983 (8 years)
4	N/A	MG Eugene R. Cromartie	September 1983 – April 1990 (6 years and 7 months)
5	N/A	MG Peter T. Berry	July 1990 – June 1995 (4 years and 11 months)
6	N/A	BG Daniel A. Doherty	July 1995 – September 1998 (3 years and 2 months)
7	N/A	BG David Foley	September 1998 – June 2001 (2 years and 9 months)
8		MG Donald J. Ryder	June 2001 – July 2006 (5 years and 1 month)
9		BG Rodney L. Johnson	July 2006 – January 2010 (3 years and 6 months)
10		BG Colleen L. McGuire	January 2010 – September 2011 (1 year and 8 months)
11		MG David E. Quantock	September 2011 – September 2014 (3 years)
12		MG Mark S. Inch	September 2014 – May 4, 2017 (2 years, 8 months and 3 days)
13		MG David P. Glaser	May 4, 2017 – June 24, 2019 (2 years, 1 month and 20 days)
14		MG Kevin Vereen	June 24, 2019 – July 10, 2020 (1 year and 16 days)
15		MG Donna W. Martin	July 10, 2020 – August 5, 2021 (1 year and 26 days)
16		BG Duane R. Miller	August 5, 2021 – September 17, 2021 (1 month and 12 days)
Director, Army Criminal Investigation Division
17		Gregory D. Ford	September 17, 2021 – August 2025 (5 years, 1 month and 28 days)
		Scott L. Moreland	January 2026 - Present

== Badges and insignia ==
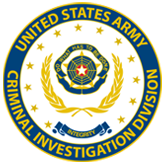
Seal of the current Criminal Investigation Division

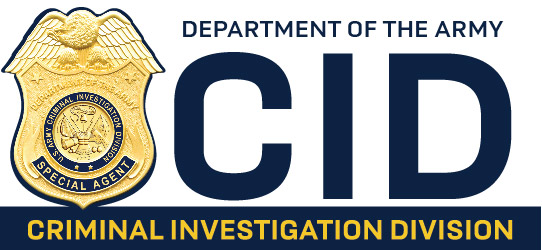
Current logo of CID

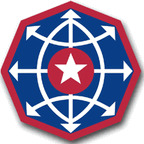
CID Shoulder Sleeve Insignia

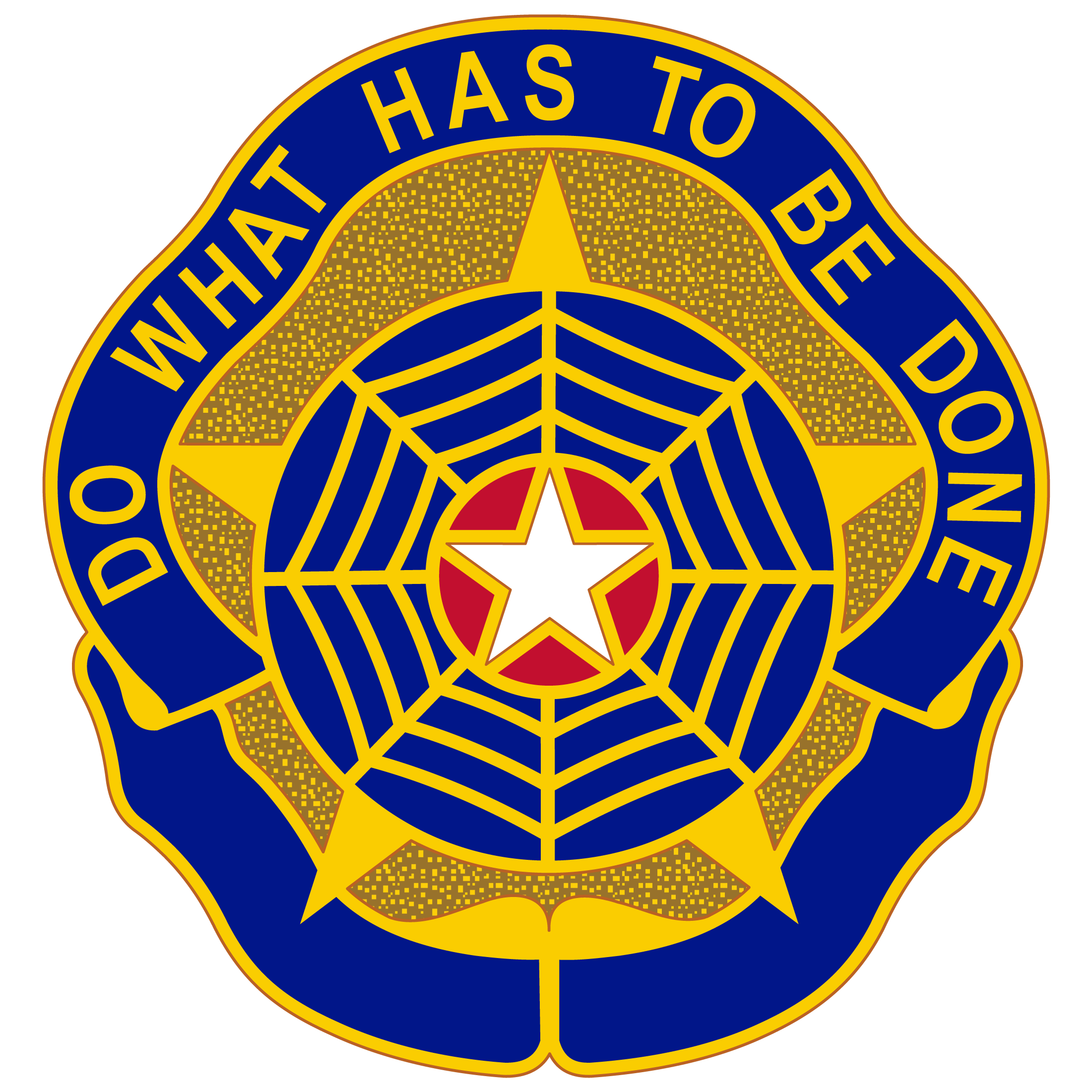
CID Distinctive unit insignia

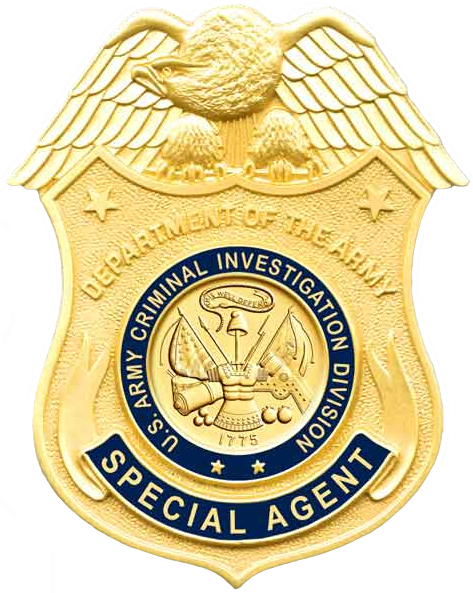
Current badge of a CID Special Agent

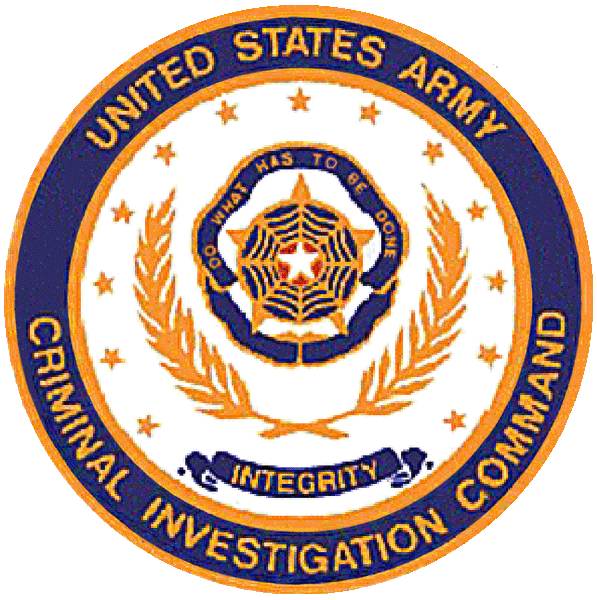
Seal of the former Criminal Investigation Command

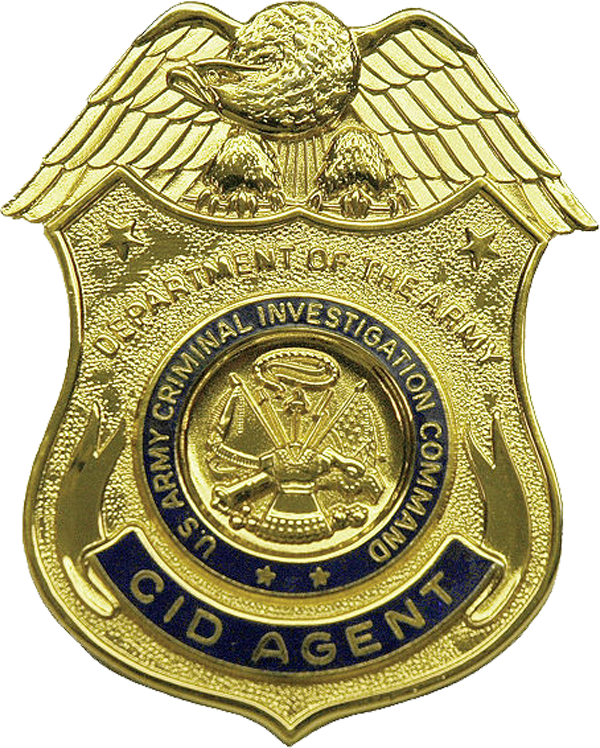
Former badge of a Criminal Investigation Command CID Agent

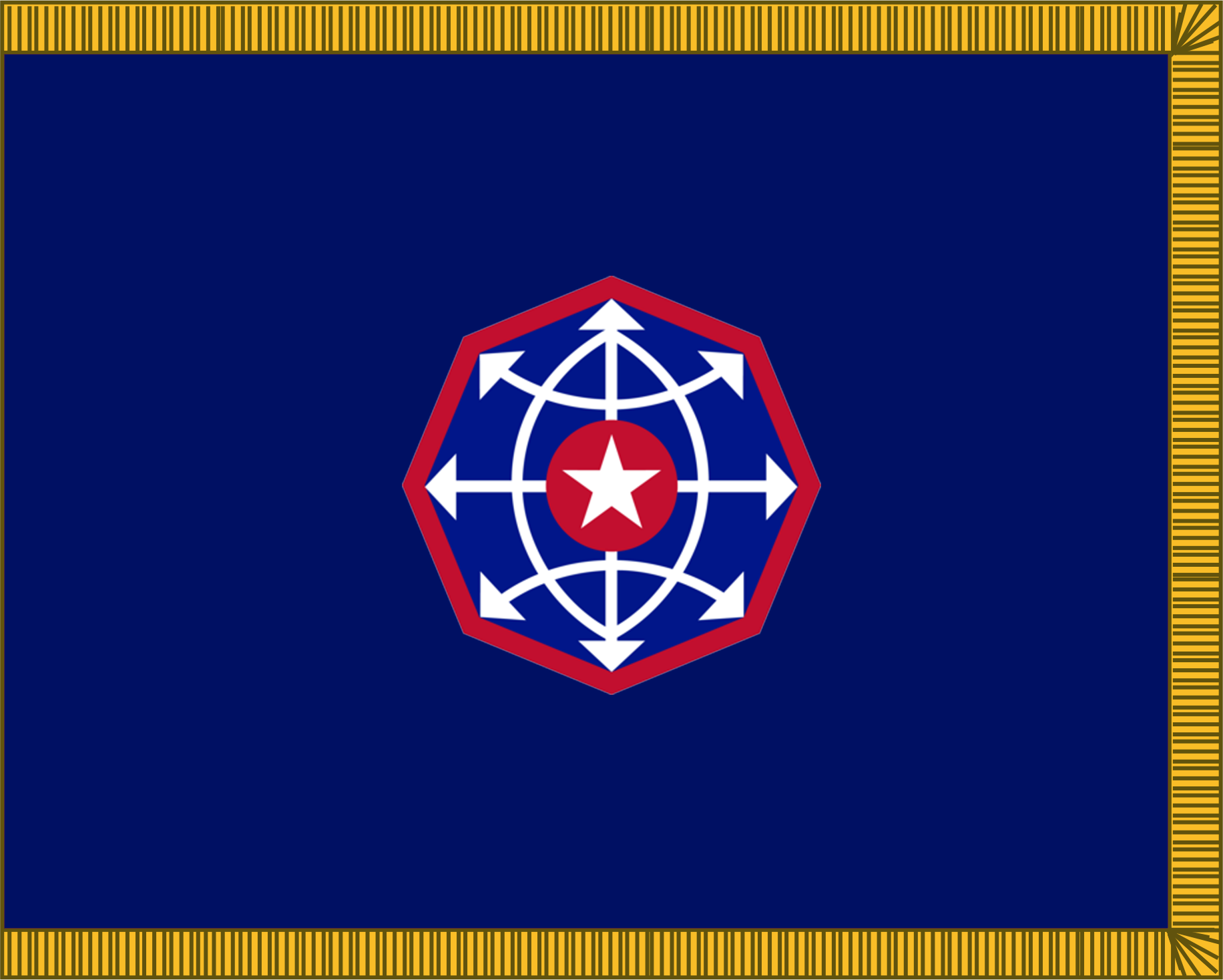
US Army Criminal Investigation Division Flag

== In popular culture ==
- The novels by Lee Child tell the story of Jack Reacher, a former U.S. Army military police major who commanded CID special agents.
  - One of the novels, Never Go Back, was adapted into a 2016 theatrical film of the same name, starring Tom Cruise and Cobie Smulders in the main roles.
- The GI Joe character Chuckles is an Army CID Special Agent - Criminal Investigator.
- The 1992 novel by Nelson DeMille titled The General's Daughter tells the story of Army CID Special Agent Paul Brenner. The book was made into a movie of the same name in 1999 starring John Travolta in the role of Brenner.
- The 2003 film Basic has the character Army Captain Julia Osborne, played by Connie Nielsen investigating a murder for CID.
- Throughout seasons 4 and 5, of the CBS drama NCIS, Army CID Agent Hollis Mann, a Lieutenant Colonel, makes six appearances.
- Stana Katic played Army CID Special Agent Adrian Lane in one episode of the CBS military action drama The Unit, in the ninth episode of its third season.
- The 2019 thriller novel The Deserter by Nelson DeMille features Army CID Special Agent Scott Brodie as its main character. He also appears in the subsequent novels Bloodlines (2023) and Tin Men (2025).
- Willem Dafoe and Gregory Hines played U.S. Army CID Special Agents investigating a murder in Saigon in the 1988 action thriller film Off Limits.
- John Puller is the main character of several novels written by David Baldacci. Puller is a former Army Ranger and veteran of the Iraq and Afghanistan wars who presently works as an Army CID Special Agent. He appears in the novels Zero Day (2011), The Forgotten (2012), The Escape (2014), No Man's Land (2016), and Daylight (2020).
- Joseph Heller's 1961 novel Catch-22 features unnamed CID investigators as minor characters.

== See also ==
Federal law enforcement

- Criminal Investigation Task Force (CITF)
- Gendarmerie
- Carabinieri
- List of United States federal law enforcement agencies
- Military Police
- Policing in the United States
- Shore Patrol
- Special Agent

JAG Corps

- United States Army Judge Advocate General's Corps

Other Military Investigative Organizations

- United States Army Counterintelligence (ACI)
- Naval Criminal Investigative Service (NCIS)
- Department of the Air Force Office of Special Investigations (OSI)
- United States Marine Corps Criminal Investigation Division (USMC CID)

Other

- U.S. Diplomatic Security Service, State Department (DSS)
- Defense Criminal Investigative Service (DCIS)
- Coast Guard Investigative Service (CGIS)
- Internal affairs (law enforcement)
