= King and Maxwell =

King and Maxwell may refer to:

- King and Maxwell (book series), a book series by David Baldacci
- King & Maxwell, an American television series, based on the novels
- King and Maxwell (novel), a 2013 novel by David Baldacci
