= Wish You Well =

Wish You Well may refer to:

- "Wish You Well" (Bernard Fanning song) (2005)
- "Wish You Well" (Sigala and Becky Hill song) (2019)
- Wish You Well (Vincent Mason song) (2025)
- "Wish You Well", a 2013 song by Lydia from the album Devil
- "Wish You Well", a 2020 song by Pvris from Use Me
- Wish You Well (film), a 2013 theatrical family film directed by Darnell Martin
- Wish You Well (novel), a novel by David Baldacci
- "Wish U Well", a 2026 song by Underscores from U
