= The Sixth Man (disambiguation) =

The Sixth Man or Sixth Man or 6th Man may refer to:

- The 6th Man, a 1997 American sports comedy film
  - The 6th Man (soundtrack)
- Sixth man, a substitute player in basketball
- Sixth man (fans), basketball fans attempting to influence the game
- The Sixth Man (novel), a 2011 novel by David Baldacci
- The Sixth Man, the 16th episode of Law & Order season 15
