= Long Shadow =

Long Shadow, The Long Shadow or Long Shadows may refer to:

== Books ==
- The Long Shadow, a 1909 Western novel by B. M. Bower
- The Long Shadow (Gilbert novel), a 1932 novel by Anthony Gilbert
- The Long Shadow (Cleary novel), a 1949 thriller by Jon Cleary
- The Long Shadow, a 1973 Harlequin Romance novel by Jane Donnelly
- The Long Shadow, a 1983 historical novel by Cynthia Harrod-Eagles that is part of the series The Morland Dynasty
- The Long Shadow, a 2008 novel by Liza Marklund
- The Long Shadow, a 2012 novel by Mark Mills
- The Long Shadow: The Great War and the Twentieth Century, a 2013 book by David Reynolds
- Long Shadows (Hunter novel), a 2008 novel in the Warriors: Power of Three series by Erin Hunter
- Long Shadows (Baldacci novel), a 2022 novel by David Baldacci
- Long Shadows, a short story collection by Marie Luise Kaschnitz

== Film and television ==
- The Long Shadow (1961 film), a British drama film
- Long Shadow (TV series), a 2014 BBC documentary series about World War I
- "The Long Shadow", a 1961 episode of the anthology series Dick Powell's Zane Grey Theatre starring Ronald and Nancy Reagan
- The Long Shadow, a 1992 drama film directed by Vilmos Zsigmond
- Long Shadow, a 1996 TV movie shown on the anthology series American Playhouse
- Long Shadow, a superhero in the 2004–06 animated TV series Justice League Unlimited based on the character Apache Chief
- The Long Shadow (2023 TV series), a British ITV drama series depicting the crimes of Peter Sutcliffe and the manhunt that followed
- Long Shadows (film), a 2025 American film

== Play ==
- Rebus: Long Shadows, a 2018 play by Ian Rankin and Rona Munro

== Music ==
- "Long Shadow", the name of several musical compositions by Haukur Tómasson
- "Long Shadow", a song by Joe Strummer & the Mescaleros from the 2003 album Streetcore
- "Long Shadow", a song by Jackson United from the 2004 album Western Ballads

== See also ==
- The Longshadows, musical collaboration between Gin Blossoms vocalist Robin Wilson and composer/producer Steve French
