= First Family (disambiguation) =

First Family is an unofficial title for the family of the family of the head of state or head of government of a country.

First Family may also refer to:

- First Family (film), a 1980 comedy film by Buck Henry
- The First Family (TV series), a 2012 syndicated sitcom by Byron Allen
- First Family (professional wrestling), a professional wrestling stable
- The First Family (album), a 1962 comedy album by Vaughn Meader
- AL 333, a hominin fossil find of Australopithecus afarensis from Hadar, Ethiopia is commonly called "First Family"
- Nickname for the Fantastic Four
- First Families of Virginia
- First Families of Boston
- First Family (novel), a 2009 novel by David Baldacci
- Adam and Eve and their children, the first humans created according to Christianity
