= No Man's Land (Baldacci novel) =

2016 novel by David Baldacci

- Hardcover edition
- Author: David Baldacci
- Language: English
- Series: John Puller
- Genre: Thriller novel
- Publisher: Grand Central Publishing
- Publication date: November 15, 2016
- Publication place: United States
- Media type: Print, e-book, audiobook
- Pages: 432 pp.
- ISBN: 978-1455586516
- Preceded by: The Escape

No Man's Land is a thriller novel written by American author David Baldacci. This is the fourth installment in the John Puller book series. The novel addresses a mystery hinted at in the previous novels: the disappearance of Puller's mother. In doing so, Puller is forced to revisit his childhood memories. Baldacci has said "in this book I was able to go back and allow [Puller] to see his childhood through his own eyes. I hoped to humanize him and deepen his character."

== Plot ==
The protagonist, John Puller, Jr., a former Army Ranger who served at Iraq and Afghanistan and now works for the U.S. Army’s Criminal Investigations Division, is spurred to investigate the unsolved case of his mother's sudden disappearance of thirty years ago when his elderly father, John Puller, Sr. is accused of her murder.

== Release ==
No Man's Land was initially published on November 15, 2016 by Grand Central Publishing in hardcover, audiobook, and ebook, as well as trade paperback (international edition only.) The trade paperback and international mass market paperback editions are scheduled to go on sale March 21, 2017, followed by the mass market paperback on July 25, 2017.

== Reception ==
No Man's Land reached #2 on the New York Times Bestseller List on December 4, 2016 in both the Hardcover and Combined Print/eBook categories. Associated Press book reviewer Waka Tsunoda wrote that the book "has a strong element of science fiction, is action-packed and thought-provoking."
