= True Blue =

True Blue may refer to:

== Arts and entertainment ==
=== Music ===
- True Blue (album), 1986
  - "True Blue" (Madonna song), the title track and single off the album
- True Blue (Tina Brooks album), 1960
- True Blue (Hank Crawford album), 1964
- True Blue (Al Cohn and Dexter Gordon album), 1976
- "True Blue", a 1972 song from the Rod Stewart album Never a Dull Moment
- True Blue – The Very Best of John Williamson, 1995 album
  - "True Blue" (John Williamson song), a song from the album
- "True Blue" (Luna Sea song), a 1994 single by Luna Sea
- "True Blue" (Tullycraft song), 7" debut single by Tullycraft
- "True Blue", a song by Bright Eyes from the single "Lua"
- "True Blue", a song by Dirty Beaches from the album Badlands
- "True Blue", a song by Zone used as the opening theme of Astro Boy
- "True Blue", a song by boygenius from the album The Record
- "True Blue", a song by Iceage from the album For Love of Grace & the Hereafter
- "True Blue Interlude", a song by Magdalena Bay from the album Imaginal Disk.
- True Blue, a companion CD issued with Frank Black & the Catholics Box Set, released May 2015
- True Blue, a 2005 CD by Bob Mosley, on Taxim Records
- True Blue, a song from Jacobite Relics.

=== Films ===
- True Blue (1918 film), an American western film directed by Frank Lloyd
- True Blue (1996 film), a film based on the 1989 Dan Topolski and Patrick Robinson book
- True Blue (2001 film), a crime thriller starring Tom Berenger and Lori Heuring

=== Other media ===
- True Blue (novel), a 2009 novel by David Baldacci
- True Blue (TV series), a television drama airing 1989–1990
- True Blue: The Oxford Boat Race Mutiny, a 1989 book by Dan Topolski and Patrick Robinson

== Other uses ==
- True Blue (color), a school color of UCLA
- Coventry blue, a blue-dyed cloth renowned for its permanence
- True blue, the French term pure laine, a politically and culturally charged phrase
- True Blue, a racehorse who finished fourth in the 1839 Grand National
- The True Blue Campus of St. George's University, Grenada
- True Blue, codename for the planning of the funeral of Margaret Thatcher
- True Blue (mascot), the mascot of the University of Toronto

== See also ==
- Tru Blu (disambiguation)
