= The Last Mile =

The Last Mile may refer to:

- The Last Mile (prison rehabilitation program), a program for inmates in the California corrections system
- The Last Mile (play), a 1930 play by John Wexley
- "The Last Mile" (song), a 1988 song by Cinderella
- "The Last Mile", a 1965 song by Nico
- The Last Mile (novel), a 2016 novel by David Baldacci

== Film ==
- The Last Mile (1932 film), an adaptation of the 1930 play
- The Last Mile (1959 film), another adaptation of the 1930 play
- The Last Mile (1992 film), an American short TV play
- The Last Mile, a 1952 industrial short film by Robert Altman

== See also ==
- Last mile (disambiguation)
