= Memory Man =

Memory Man may refer to:

== Literature ==
- Memory Man (novel), a 2015 novel by David Baldacci
- The Memory Man, a 2004 novel by Lisa Appignanesi

== Music ==
- Memory Man (album), a 2007 album by Aqualung
- Memory Man, a delay effect pedal by Electro-Harmonix

== Television ==
- "The Memory Man" (1983), season 6, episode 2 of Tales of the Unexpected
- "The Memory Man" (1987), series 5, episode 1 of Bergerac
- "Memory Man" (1993), season 1, episode 11 of Moon Over Miami
- "Memory Man" (2013), series 1, episode 1 of Count Arthur Strong
