= Camel Club =

Group of fictional characters

The Camel Club is a group of fictional characters created by American novelist David Baldacci. They are the protagonists of five of his novels: The Camel Club, The Collectors, Stone Cold, Divine Justice, and Hell's Corner. The original members are Oliver Stone, Reuben Rhodes, Caleb Shaw, and Milton Farb. The four are political watch-dogs, who are always looking for conspiracies within the government.

== Camel Club original members ==
=== Oliver Stone ===
Oliver Stone is the leader of the Camel Club. Stone is the crypt keeper of the Mt. Zion United Methodist Church. Stone is a false name (his real name, though rarely used, is John Carr), taken because of the real Oliver Stone's conspiracy theory-themed movies. Stone is an ex-Green Beret and a former member of the esteemed and fictional "Triple Six" division of the CIA that was composed of highly skilled government assassins. Stone himself is also monitored by the government, which constantly has agents watching him. In Stone Cold, people connected to Stone's past are killed by Harry Finn, whose ultimate goal is to kill former CIA Director Carter Gray.

=== Reuben Rhodes ===
A West Point graduate and Vietnam vet, Reuben worked for the Defense Intelligence Agency but quit and became a war protester. After a few years of drug usage in England, Rhodes returned to the States, where he met Stone, who got him a job unloading trucks. He and Stone are the best marksmen in the group.

=== Caleb Shaw ===
Caleb Shaw is an employee of the Rare Book Wing of the Library of Congress. He, like Rhodes, was a protester of the Vietnam war. Shaw holds twin doctorates in political science and eighteenth century literature. Shaw is also known for always wearing clothing from the 19th century. In The Collectors, Shaw's boss is murdered in the sealed Rare Book Room.

=== Milton Farb ===
Farb is a child prodigy who suffers from extreme obsessive-compulsive disorder and paranoia. As a child, his parents had him act in a side show, adding extremely high numbers in his head and reciting extremely long sections of text without faltering. As is shown in Stone Cold, Farb's gifts allow him to win extremely high amounts of money at casino games, such as blackjack. Farb was hired by the National Health Institute, but was fired after sending a threatening letter to the President. Stone met him and got him on the TV show Jeopardy! With medication, Farb was able to make a small fortune, with which he started a company for designing Web sites. Farb was the first of the group to warm up to Annabelle Conroy. He is later killed by a sniper during a confrontation with CIA agent Carter Gray in the climax of Stone Cold.

== Additional members ==
Along with the original four, the Camel Club acquires additional members from people who share similar goals.

=== Alex Ford ===
A Secret Service agent, Ford helps the group in the first book, The Camel Club, as they try to uncover a conspiracy that involves the kidnapping of President James H. Brennan and a captured Muslim terrorist. He is made a member of the Club at the end of the book. In The Collectors, Oliver Stone asks for Ford's help as part of the climax of the novel. In Stone Cold, he helps Annabelle Conroy in her escape from casino king and mobster, Jerry Bagger.

=== Kate Adams ===
A lawyer with the Department of Justice (DOJ), part-time bartender and Alex Ford's girlfriend. She, too, assists the Camel Club in The Camel Club, and becomes a member at the end of the book. She and Ford have broken up by Stone Cold.

=== Annabelle Conroy ===
A compulsive thief, Conroy runs scams on people to steal large amounts of money, including stealing millions from New Jersey mob boss Jerry Bagger. Conroy was briefly married (annulled) to Jonathan DeHaven, the director of the Rare Book Room at the Library of Congress. DeHaven's house was found to be the hiding place for a first edition of the Bay Psalm Book, which was later revealed to have been stolen by Conroy. During Stone Cold she joins the Camel Club in the fight against Jerry Bagger and Harry Finn.

== Books ==
1. The Camel Club (2005)
2. The Collectors (2006)
3. Stone Cold (2007)
4. Divine Justice (2008)
5. Hell's Corner (2010)
