= The Christmas Train (film) =

2017 Christmas film

- Release poster
- Genre: Christmas romantic drama
- Based on: The Christmas Train by David Baldacci
- Teleplay by: Neal Dobrofsky; Tippi Dobrofsky
- Directed by: Ron Oliver
- Starring: Dermot Mulroney; Kimberly Williams-Paisley; Danny Glover; Joan Cusack
- Music by: Peter Allen
- Country of origin: United States
- Original language: English

Production
- Executive producers: Karen S. Spiegel; David Baldacci; Neal Dobrofsky; Tippi Dobrofsky
- Producer: Harvey Kahn
- Cinematography: Adam Swilinski
- Editor: Tony Dean Smith
- Running time: 99 minutes
- Production company: Front Street Pictures

Original release
- Network: Hallmark Channel; Hallmark Movies & Mysteries
- Release: November 25, 2017

The Christmas Train is a 2017 American Christmas romantic drama television film directed by Ron Oliver and written by Neal Dobrofsky and Tippi Dobrofsky, based on the 2003 novel by David Baldacci. The film stars Dermot Mulroney, Kimberly Williams-Paisley, Danny Glover, and Joan Cusack.

The film premiered on the Hallmark Channel and Hallmark Movies & Mysteries on November 25, 2017, as an episode of the Hallmark Hall of Fame anthology series.

== Premise ==
Journalist Tom Langdon attempts to make it Los Angeles from Washington, D.C. in time for Christmas. Taking the train, Tom encounters various passengers including Max Powers, a film producer, Agnes, and a former love, Eleanor Carter.

== Cast ==
- Dermot Mulroney as Tom Langdon
- Kimberly Williams-Paisley as Eleanor Carter
- Danny Glover as Max Powers
- Joan Cusack as Agnes

== Music ==
Alongside starring in The Christmas Train, Dermot Mulroney also wrote and sang a song titled "Christmas Train" which can be heard in the film.

== Release ==
The Christmas Train was released on November 25, 2017.

== See also ==
- List of Christmas films
