= Divine Justice (novel) =

2008 crime novel by David Baldacci

- Hardcover edition
- Author: David Baldacci
- Language: English
- Series: Camel Club
- Genre: Crime novel
- Publisher: Grand Central Publishing
- Publication date: November 4, 2008
- Publication place: United States
- Media type: Print, e-book, audiobook
- Pages: 400 pp (hardback)
- ISBN: 978-0-4461-9550-8
- Preceded by: Stone Cold
- Followed by: Hell's Corner

Divine Justice is a crime novel written by American author David Baldacci. This is the fourth installment to feature the Camel Club. The book was initially published on November 4, 2008, by Grand Central Publishing.
