= The Forgotten (Baldacci novel) =

2012 novel by David Baldacci

- Hardcover edition
- Author: David Baldacci
- Language: English
- Series: John Puller
- Genre: Thriller novel
- Publisher: Grand Central Publishing
- Publication date: November 20, 2012
- Publication place: United States
- Media type: Print, e-book, audiobook
- Pages: 464 pp.
- ISBN: 978-0446573054
- Preceded by: Zero Day
- Followed by: The Escape

The Forgotten is a thriller novel written by American author David Baldacci. This is the second installment to feature John Puller, a former Army Ranger who served at Iraq and Afghanistan and now works for the U.S. Army’s Criminal Investigations Division. The book was published on November 20, 2012 by Grand Central Publishing.

== Plot ==
John Puller receives word that his aunt, Betsy Puller Simon, has been murdered after visiting her town of Paradise, Florida. He suspects that she was murdered and begins an investigation into her death, aided by his old friend Julie Carson and a local officer named Cheryl Landry.

Meanwhile, Gavril "Mecho", a large man from Bulgaria, is on his own mission to get vengeance. A man named Peter J. Lampert is conducting a secret and illegal human slave trade in Paradise using people from Bulgaria, with one of the people enslaved being Mecho's sister Rada. Mecho works with Chrissy Murdoch, a woman who is being used for sex by Lampert, to stage attacks on Lampert.

Throughout Puller's investigation, he crosses paths with Mecho multiple times, who helps him fight off various goons who attack him. After Puller and Julie run into Mecho and Chrissy, the latter reveals herself as a Colombian agent named Claudia Diaz. Puller, Julie, Mecho, Diaz, and Cheryl attack a ship carrying various human slaves and free them, but Cheryl is revealed to be a dirty cop working with Lampert. Cheryl strikes a deal with Puller to draw out Lampert.

The plan goes well until several of Lampert's goons attack, killing Diaz and wounding Julie. Puller and Mecho track down a fleeing Lampert, where Mecho attempts to interrogate him on where Rada is. After Mecho punches out several of Lampert's teeth and Lampert refuses to disclose Rada's location, Puller allows Mecho to capture Lampert and take him to a Bulgarian prison.

Afterwards, Puller and Julie return home, where he reports back to his amnesiac father.
