= Hell's Corner =

2010 novel by David Baldacci

- Hardcover edition
- Author: David Baldacci
- Language: English
- Series: Camel Club
- Genre: Crime novel
- Publisher: Grand Central Publishing
- Publication date: November 9, 2010
- Publication place: United States
- Media type: Print, e-book, audiobook
- Pages: 720 pp (hardback)
- ISBN: 978-0-4465-7369-6
- Preceded by: Divine Justice

Hell's Corner is a crime novel written by David Baldacci. This is the fifth and final installment to feature the Camel Club, a small group of Washington, D.C. civilian misfits led by "Oliver Stone", an ex-Green Beret and a former CIA trained assassin. The book was initially published on November 9, 2010, by Grand Central Publishing.
