= Wish You Well (novel) =

2001 novel by David Baldacci

- Hardcover edition
- Author: David Baldacci
- Language: English
- Genre: Historical, Crime novel
- Publisher: Warner Books
- Publication date: June 30, 2001
- Publication place: United States
- Media type: Print (hardback & paperback)
- Pages: 365 pp (first edition, hardback)
- ISBN: 0-446-61010-0 (first edition, hardback)
- OCLC: 48103353

Wish You Well is a novel written by David Baldacci. First published in 2001, the story starts with the Cardinal family planning to move from New York to California due to money problems, then shifts to the mountains of Virginia after a car accident leaves the father dead and the mother in a catatonic state. The time period is in the 1940s.

The novel was made into a 2013 theatrical film scripted by Baldacci and starring Mackenzie Foy and Ellen Burstyn as a great-granddaughter and great-grandmother.

== Plot summary ==
The story starts out with the Cardinal family going on a trip to relieve them from some unknown stress. On the way back, it is revealed that the Cardinal family plans to move to California, due to financial concerns. Jack Cardinal is an acclaimed but underpaid writer, and plans to move with promises of higher pay. However, Amanda, his wife, is opposed to the idea, stating that they would not be happy and that Jack would not be free to write as he pleases, being controlled by the movie studios. Seeing that the children seem asleep, they battle it out.

Eventually, a violent outburst awakes Lou, a young girl who greatly admires her father. She tries to stop the argument multiple times by offering a story, but Jack is undeterred. Meanwhile, Oz, Lou's timid little brother is also awakened. Both Amanda and Lou hurry to comfort him, while simultaneously being calmed. As the argument further escalates, none of the passengers notice a man in the middle of the road, blocking their way. Jack turns the car just in time to avoid killing the man, but then loses all control. The car rolls, and when it stops, Jack is dead. Amanda faints.

The story then shifts forward to the funeral, where it is discovered that Amanda is now in a catatonic state. Lou overhears two men discussing the fate of the children, and offers the idea of moving in with their great-grandmother in the mountains of Virginia, Louisa Mae. The men accept the offer, and the two children, a nurse, and their mother head off.

When they arrive at the station, an African-American man picks them up and drives them through a series of towns, each more sparsely populated than the one previous. Soon they pick up a boy, who introduces both himself and their driver. Afterwards, he leaves to fish, and the others continue on towards Louisa's house.

Once there, Lou starts a completely new life, learning different chores and helping with the farm. In return, they achieve a comfortable, yet poor lifestyle.

Diamond, the boy they picked up, starts playing a bigger role, often taking the children out on adventures, showing them things such as a little collection of items, a wishing well, a danger-filled shortcut to the city, his version of constellations and the like. Eugene, the "mute" that drove the car, is also revealed as an honest man that will stand up for what is right. At around the same time, Cotton Longfellow, a lawyer, shows up, and offers to read to Amanda in hopes that she would get better.

Then, a mysterious offer from Southern Valley, a coal and gas company, comes in, offering Louisa $100,000 for her land. She refuses, but receives pressure from her neighbors, who have also received the offer but is told that their land is useless without Louisa's.

Then, a series of incidents occurs. Diamond dies in a dynamite explosion, killed trying to save his dog. Louisa's barn is burned to the ground in the middle of the night, causing her to suffer a stroke. George Davis, a wealthy but hateful farmer, goes into Louisa's land in search of something.

Southern Valley comes back with an offer of 5 times the original, but is now refused by Cotton. It is then revealed that a court case is to ensue.

Southern Valley is represented by Thurston Goode, a renowned lawyer from Richmond. He and Cotton each have several goes at the jury at a very eventful court case. In the end, however, Southern Valley wins, but Amanda comes in, supported by her children, and the book ends with her getting back the land Louisa fought so hard to protect.

In the book's epilogue, in which Lou is in her golden age, she writes that after the trial, Cotton and her mother married the following year, and soon afterwards he adopted the children. Oz became a star Major League baseball pitcher and later retired to become a school teacher. Eugene built his own farm, married and raised a family, and remained good friends with Lou. Lou states that, like her father, she left the mountains to become a famous writer, but she, unlike Jack, returned years later to live out the rest of her life at the family home.
