= Hour Game =

Crime fiction novel by David Baldacci

- Hardcover edition
- Author: David Baldacci
- Language: English
- Series: The second book in the King and Maxwell (book series)
- Genre: Fiction
- Publisher: Warner Books
- Publication date: October 26, 2004
- Publication place: United States
- Media type: Print, e-book, audiobook
- Pages: 736 pp.
- ISBN: 978-0446577106
- Preceded by: Split Second
- Followed by: Simple Genius

Hour Game is a crime fiction novel written by American writer David Baldacci. This is the second installment in the King and Maxwell book series. The book was published on October 26, 2004, by Warner Books.
