= Total Control (novel) =

1997 novel by David Baldacci

- Hardcover edition
- Author: David Baldacci
- Language: English
- Genre: Crime novel
- Publisher: Warner Books
- Publication date: January 1, 1997
- Publication place: United States
- Media type: Print, e-book, audiobook
- Pages: 520 pp. (hardback)
- ISBN: 978-0446520959

Total Control is a crime novel written by David Baldacci. The book was initially published on January 1, 1997 by Warner Books.
