= Absolute Power (novel) =

1996 novel by David Baldacci

- Author: David Baldacci
- Language: English
- Genre: Crime, thriller
- Publisher: Warner Books
- Publication date: November 1, 1996
- Publication place: United States
- Media type: Print (hardback & paperback)
- Pages: 505 pp (first edition, hardback)
- ISBN: 978-0-446-60358-4 (first edition, hardback)
- OCLC: 35813980

Absolute Power is a 1996 book by David Baldacci. In 1997, it was made into a film starring Clint Eastwood.

== Plot summary ==
An experienced burglar, Luther Whitney, breaks into a billionaire's house with the intent of robbing it. While there, he witnesses the president of the United States and the billionaire's wife having sex. However, their lovemaking turns violent and Secret Service agents burst in and kill the woman, which Whitney also sees. Whitney is able to witness the murder because he was behind a large one-way mirror that was a secret door into a large closet where the billionaire would sit and watch when his wife had sex with another man. Whitney escapes, but not before the Secret Service learns of his presence; they blame the wife's murder on Whitney. Whitney goes on the run from the president's agents while a detective tries to piece together the crime.

== Characters ==
=== Luther Whitney ===
Whitney is a professional burglar who has been caught three times. He witnesses an incident and runs for his life, but later comes back and endeavors to bring the real criminal to justice.

=== Kate Whitney ===
Kate is Luther's only daughter and a dedicated prosecutor. Luther had been in jail during Kate's childhood, which leads her to be harsh on criminals, especially thieves and burglars. The police later use her to get to Luther, which changes her outlook on her father and her own life.

== Critical reception ==
Publishers Weekly called Baldacci "a first-rate storyteller who grabs readers by their lapels right away and won't let go until they've finished his enthralling yarn." Kirkus Reviews gave it a poor review, writing: "For all its arresting premise, an overblown and tedious tale of capital sins." Jonathan Kirsch, in the Los Angeles Times, was slightly more receptive, writing that "Baldacci is never subtle, but he succeeds in building up enough suspense to keep us reading, if only to find out exactly how evil all the president’s men (and women) will turn out to be."

== See also ==
- Absolute Power (film)
