= The Camel Club (novel) =

2005 novel by David Baldacci

- Hardcover edition
- Author: David Baldacci
- Language: English
- Series: Camel Club
- Genre: Crime novel
- Publisher: Grand Central Publishing
- Publication date: October 25, 2005
- Publication place: United States
- Media type: Print, e-book, audiobook
- Pages: 816 pp (hardback)
- ISBN: 978-0-4465-7880-6
- Followed by: The Collectors

The Camel Club is a crime novel by American writer David Baldacci. This is the first book to feature the Camel Club, a small group of Washington, D.C. civilian misfits led by "Oliver Stone", an ex-Green Beret and a former CIA trained assassin. The book was initially published on October 25, 2005, by Grand Central Publishing.
