= The Christmas Train =

Book by David Baldacci

- Hardcover edition
- Author: David Baldacci
- Language: English
- Genre: Fiction
- Publisher: Grand Central Publishing
- Publication date: October 17, 2003
- Publication place: United States
- Media type: Print (hardback & paperback)
- Pages: 272 pp (first edition, hardback)
- ISBN: 978-0446533270

The Christmas Train is a fiction novel written by David Baldacci. The book was initially published on October 17, 2003, by Grand Central Publishing. The book was adapted into a TV movie by the same name and released on the Hallmark Channel for the 2017 Christmas season.

== Reception ==
Publishers Weekly found it to be "loaded with cool train lore" and "plenty of romance and good cheer", but note that "suspense is low", and faulted Baldacci for "get[ting] a bit preachy".
