= Last Man Standing (novel) =

2001 thriller novel by David Baldacci

- Hardcover edition
- Author: David Baldacci
- Language: English
- Genre: Crime thriller
- Publisher: Warner Books
- Publication date: November 6, 2001
- Publication place: United States
- Media type: Print (hardback & paperback)
- Pages: 548 pp (first edition, hardback)
- ISBN: 978-0446525800

Last Man Standing is a crime thriller novel written by David Baldacci and released on November 6, 2001 by Warner Books. The novel depicts an ambush on an FBI Hostage Rescue Team unit and the titular sole survivor's investigation into how it happened and who could be responsible for it.

Baldacci acknowledges a number of technical advisors for his novel including Chris Whitcomb, a former HRT sniper who was at Ruby Ridge and Waco.

== Plot ==
Charlie, a unit of the FBI Hostage Rescue Team led by HRT operator Web London, is deployed to raid a drug hideout in Washington, D.C. As they approach the hideout in a dark alleyway, they are surprised to see a 10-year-old boy. London, the pointman of the operation, suddenly freezes up and falls over, watching helplessly as the rest of Charlie is killed in the raid.

London is the only survivor of the botched raid. Now mentally and physically scarred by the incident and distrusted by the FBI, London aims to prove his innocence and attempt to understand what happened in the alleyway. Taking up a post at a horse ranch in Virginia, London begins a two-pronged investigation: an external investigation to seek whoever set Charlie up, and an internal investigation where he delves into his painful past with psychiatrist Claire Daniels.

The key seems to be the boy from the alley. After Charlie was killed, London gave the boy a note to warn the backup team of the ambush; however, the FBI lost the boy before being able to question him. Also missing is the undercover agent that provided the information on the hideout. London finds a connection between the ambush and the seemingly separate killings of a judge, a prosecutor, and a defense counsel, and learns that a cult leader he arrested in a prior standoff seems to be back for revenge.

Meanwhile, drug empire kingpin Francis Westbrook also begins to investigate the ambush, having owned but never used the hideout from the raid. Westbrook aims to find the boy from the alley, revealed to be his brother, while also attempting to find a traitor within his ranks.
