= The Innocent (Baldacci novel) =

Book by David Baldacci

- Hardcover edition
- Author: David Baldacci
- Language: English
- Series: Will Robie
- Genre: Thriller novel
- Publisher: Grand Central Publishing
- Publication date: October 9, 2012
- Publication place: United States
- Media type: Print, e-book, audiobook
- Pages: 448 pp.
- ISBN: 978-1455519002
- Followed by: The Hit

The Innocent is a thriller novel by American writer David Baldacci. This is the first book to feature Will Robie, a highly skilled U.S. government assassin. The book was initially published on October 9, 2012, by Grand Central Publishing.

== Plot ==
Will Robie is a seasoned CIA agent and assassin who has recently returned to United States after his recent missions of eliminating Mexican drug lord and human trafficker Carlos Rivera and disgraced Saudi prince Khalil bin Talal. Throughout the story, Robie has a relationship with his next-door neighbor Annie Lambert, a secretary in the White House.

Robie is given a new mission to eliminate Jane Wind, a suspected member of a terrorist cell. After arriving at her house, he hesitates to kill her after feeling suspicious of his mission, forcing his handler to kill the target with another assassin, causing Robie to flee the scene.

Meanwhile, a girl named Julie Getty escapes her abusive foster parents and returns to her home when she discovers her parents have been killed by an unknown assassin, forcing her to run away. Robie and Julie take the same bus when the assassin follows the latter. Robie subdues the assassin before leaving the bus with Julie just before the bus explodes, knocking both of them out and killing everyone inside. Robie takes Julie to his safehouse before returning to his apartment.

Robie is later contacted by his superior, "Blue Man", who later reveals that his latest mission was a set-up and he suspects there are traitors in the agency. He orders Robie to work together with the FBI to investigate the murder and the bombing to throw their suspicions towards the former. Robie and FBI agent Nicole Vance decide to track Jane's ex-husband Rick to question him, only to find his decomposed body. During their investigations Robie, Vance, and Julie survive numerous assassination attempts by traitors from both the FBI and CIA, and Robie discovers that Julie's father and Rick were members of the same squad during the Gulf War. Robie later asks Vance to look after Julie while he tries to find the mastermind behind the attack.

Robie meets with his mentor and predecessor, Shane Connors, to ask for help tracking the remaining squad members. Robie later meets Jerome Cassidy, another squad member and Julie's real father, and Elizabeth van Beuren, the only female member in the squad. She is being treated in hospice for a terminal disease she got during the war. Robie later discovers that Elizabeth was killed by her husband George after she had discovered his plans to assassinate the president and told the plot to every squad member except Cassidy when they visited her. Robie and Blue Man rush to the White House to apprehend George, only to found him knocked unconscious, forcing Robie to find the real assassin by himself. Much to his shock, Robie finds his neighbor Annie to be the assassin before he is forced to kill her, saving the president.

Robie is later contacted by Talal (who had survived the assassination attempt), who has kidnapped Julie and Vance and demands that Robie come to Morocco alone in exchange for their safety. Talal reneges on the deal and decides to have the three of them killed as revenge for foiling his plan to kill the president. Suddenly, one of his bodyguards, revealed as the informant, helps Robie to escape and kill Talal's remaining bodyguards, with help from Connors. Robie later sends Talal to the Saudi authorities before he returns home with Julie and Vance.

Robie has a meeting with Blue Man and Connors. Blue Man reveals that Annie was brainwashed by her adoptive parents, Iranian citizens who hated Americans, to become an assassin for Talal. Talal had her moved to Robie's apartment in order to spy on him. Talal also had all the squad members who knew the plot, including Julie's parents, killed, and the attempts on his life were part of Talal's psychological torture in order to break him. Blue Man also reveals that Talal has been executed for his crimes. In the epilogue, Robie and Vance watch as Julie is adopted by Cassidy.
