= Last mile =

Last mile may refer to:

- Last mile (telecommunications), the final leg of a telecoms network
- Last mile (transportation), the final leg
- "Last Mile", a song by Badmarsh & Shri from the album Signs

== See also ==
- The Last Mile (disambiguation)
