= Tru Blu =

Tru Blu may refer to:

- Tru Blu Beverages, an Australian soft drink producer
- Tru Blu Entertainment, an Australian video game publisher
- Tru-Blu, a snack food brand produced by AbiMar Foods, a subsidiary of Grupo Nutresa
- Tru Blu, pre-production name for the film American Gangster
- TruBlu, a streaming service co-founded by Chris Hansen

== See also ==
- True Blue (disambiguation)
