= The Hit (novel) =

Novel by David Baldacci

- Hardcover edition
- Author: David Baldacci
- Language: English
- Series: Will Robie
- Genre: Thriller novel
- Publisher: Grand Central Publishing
- Publication date: April 23, 2013
- Publication place: United States
- Media type: Print, e-book, audiobook
- Pages: 392 pp (first edition, hardback)
- ISBN: 978-0606322638
- Preceded by: The Innocent
- Followed by: The Target

The Hit is a thriller novel written by American author David Baldacci. This is the second installment to feature Will Robie, a U.S. Government assassin who first appeared in Baldacci's 2012 novel The Innocent. The book was initially published on April 23, 2013, by Grand Central Publishing.
