= The Collectors (novel) =

Novel by David Baldacci

- Hardcover edition
- Author: David Baldacci
- Language: English
- Series: Camel Club
- Genre: Crime novel
- Publisher: Warner Books
- Publication date: October 17, 2006
- Publication place: United States
- Media type: Print, e-book, audiobook
- Pages: 448 pp (hardback)
- ISBN: 978-0-4465-3109-2
- Preceded by: The Camel Club
- Followed by: Stone Cold

The Collectors is a thriller novel written by American author David Baldacci. The book was published by Warner Books on October 17, 2006. This is the second installment to feature the Camel Club, a small group of Washington, D.C. civilian misfits led by "Oliver Stone", an ex-Green Beret and a former CIA trained assassin. On November 5, 2006, the novel debuted at No. 2 on the New York Times Best Seller list, and remained on the list for seven weeks. The plot begins with the deaths of the Speaker of the United States House of Representatives and the head of the rare books collection at the Library of Congress.

== Plot summary ==
The Speaker of the United States House of Representatives and the curator of the rare books collection of the Library of Congress both are found dead. The Speaker has been killed by a sniper at a party while the head of the rare books collection dies from "unknown circumstances." Oliver Stone and the Camel Club become suspicious, although initially they indulge what they believe is his overactive imagination. Stone and his cohorts discover that Seagraves had been selling American intelligence secrets to terrorists in the Middle East, compromising intelligence efforts in the region. However, when they are followed and ask the Secret Service for help, the followers disappear, and the Camel Club becomes interested in their activities. Seagraves kidnaps and subsequently tortures Stone for information. Annabelle Conroy is introduced as a con artist, who after pulling off a $40 million heist against an Atlantic City Casino owner (Jerry Bagger) is on the run for her life. Bagger wants to find and kill Annabelle and her con team. Alex Ford from the previous novel reappears, and in the climax Seagraves is killed by a knife thrown at his carotid artery by Stone who turns out to be an ex-CIA killer. Alex Ford and his agents take Seagrave's remaining collaborators into custody. One of Annabelle Conroy's collaborators in the heist is tortured for information by the angry casino owner, who finds out the general area in which she is living (Washington, D.C.). The novel ends with a set-up for Stone Cold, the third novel of the Camel Club series.

== Critical reception ==
Doug Childers of the Richmond Times said that, while the book had a "splendid opening", the rest of the novel "doesn't take the direction readers might expect". Lee Ann Montanaro of The Times of Malta stated that the novel didn't "qualify as a masterly display of the thriller-writing genre" and that they were "expecting more". A San Antonio Express-News writer, in their title, said that the novel was "predictable and superficial but well-written".
