= King and Maxwell (book series) =

Book series by David Baldacci

King and Maxwell series
- Split Second; Hour Game; Simple Genius; First Family; The Sixth Man; King and Maxwell
- Author: David Baldacci
- Country: United States
- Language: English
- Genre: Crime novel
- Publisher: Grand Central Publishing
- Published: September 2003 (for Split Second)
- Media type: Print (hardback and paperback)
- No. of books: 6

The King and Maxwell book series is a crime novel book series created by American novelist David Baldacci. The series consists of six books featuring two former Secret Service agents Sean King and Michelle Maxwell: Split Second (2003), Hour Game (2004), Simple Genius (2007), First Family (2009), The Sixth Man (2011), and King and Maxwell (2013).

== Books ==
1. Split Second. Grand Central Publishing. September 30, 2003. ISBN 0446533122.
2. Hour Game. Warner Books. October 2, 2004. ISBN 0446577103.
3. Simple Genius. Warner Books. April 24, 2007. ISBN 978-0446580342.
4. First Family. Grand Central Publishing. April 21, 2009. ISBN 978-0446539753.
5. The Sixth Man. Grand Central Publishing. January 1, 2011.
6. King and Maxwell. Grand Central Publishing. November 19, 2013. ISBN 978-1455521319.

== Adaptations ==
The Sixth Man was adapted into the King & Maxwell television series on TNT.
