= Rodney L. Johnson =

United States Army general

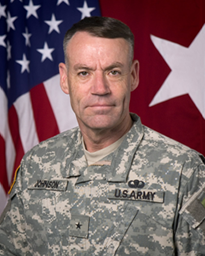
- Brigadier General Rodney L. Johnson c. 2006
- Born: 13 April 1955; Atkinson, Nebraska
- Died: 24 December 2023
- Military career
- Allegiance: United States
- Branch: United States Army
- Service years: 1977–2010
- Rank: Brigadier General
- Commands: United States Army Criminal Investigation Command; United States Army Military Police School; 14th Military Police Brigade; 720th Military Police Battalion
- Awards: Army Distinguished Service Medal; Legion of Merit (4)

Brigadier General Rodney L. Johnson (13 April 1955 – 24 December 2023) was a senior officer of the United States Army as the 9th Commanding General of the U.S. Army Criminal Investigation Command and the 12th Provost Marshal General of the Army.

== Biography ==
Johnson was born in Atkinson, Nebraska and raised in the rural area of Burke, South Dakota. He graduated from South Dakota State University in May 1977, and subsequently received a Reserve Army commission as a second lieutenant in the Military Police Corps. The source of his commissioned service was the Reserve Officer Training Corps. Johnson died on 24 December 2023.

=== Military assignments ===
- Commander, 545th Division MP Company (1st Cav Div), Fort Hood Texas;
- S3, 720th MP Battalion, Fort Hood, Texas;
- Chief, Plans Branch, Office of the Provost Marshal, HQ USAREUR;
- Executive Officer, 97th MP Battalion in the Federal Republic of Germany (1989–1994);
- Commander, 720th MP Battalion, Guantanamo Bay, Cuba and Fort Hood, Texas;
- Chief, Current Operations, Department of Military Support, ODCSOPS, Washington, DC;
- Commander, 14th Military Police Brigade, Fort Leonard Wood, Missouri;
- Executive Officer, Director of the Army Staff, Washington, DC,
- Executive Officer, Commanding General TRADOC, Fort Monroe, Virginia.
- Commandant, United States Army Military Police School – 28 June 2004 to July 7, 2006
- Provost Marshal General of the Army and commanding general, United States Army Criminal Investigation Command – 14 July 2006.

== Education ==
Johnson had a Bachelor of Science degree in sociology from South Dakota State University; a Master of Science degree in Police Science and Public Administration from Wichita State University; and a Master of Science degree in National Security Strategy from the National War College. His military education included the MP Officer Basic Course, the MP Officer Advanced Course, the Combined Arms Services Staff School, the Command and General Staff College, the DoD Emergency Preparedness Course, and the National War College. He was also a graduate of the FBI National Academy.

== Honors and awards ==
- Army Distinguished Service Medal
- Legion of Merit (with 3 Oak Leaf Clusters)
- Defense Meritorious Service Medal
- Meritorious Service Medal (with 4 Oak Leaf Clusters)
- Army Commendation Medal (with 2 Oak Leaf Clusters)
- Army Achievement Medal
- Parachutist Badge
- Army Staff Identification Badge

Other decorations and awards include: National Defense Service Medal (Bronze Star), Humanitarian Service Medal, Military Outstanding Volunteer Service Medal (OLC), Armed Forces Reserve Medal, Army Service Ribbon, Overseas Service Medal, Airborne Wings. Additionally, he wears the Joint Meritorious Unit Award (OLC), the Army Superior Unit Award (OLC), and the Coast Guard Meritorious Unit Commendation; and is an MPOA Distinguished Honor Graduate, USAMPS Distinguished Instructor, CGSC Military Police Honor Graduate; and recipient of the Military Police Regimental Association's Order of The Marechaussee.
