= Split Second (novel) =

Crime fiction novel by David Baldacci

- Hardcover edition
- Author: David Baldacci
- Language: English
- Series: The first book in the King and Maxwell (book series)
- Genre: Fiction
- Publisher: Grand Central Publishing
- Publication date: September 30, 2003
- Publication place: United States
- Media type: Print, e-book, audiobook
- Pages: 544 pp.
- ISBN: 978-0446533126
- Followed by: Hour Game

Split Second is a crime fiction novel written by American author David Baldacci. It is the first book in the King and Maxwell book series. The novel was published on September 30, 2003, by Grand Central Publishing.
