= The Guilty (Baldacci novel) =

2015 novel by David Baldacci

- Hardcover edition
- Author: David Baldacci
- Language: English
- Series: Will Robie
- Genre: Thriller novel
- Publisher: Grand Central Publishing
- Publication date: November 17, 2015
- Publication place: United States
- Media type: Print, e-book, audiobook
- Pages: 432 pp.
- ISBN: 978-1455586424
- Preceded by: The Target
- Followed by: End Game

The Guilty is thriller novel written by David Baldacci. It is the fourth installment to feature Will Robie, a highly skilled U.S. Government assassin. The book was released on November 17, 2015 by Grand Central Publishing.
