= The Target (novel) =

Book by David Baldacci

- Cover of the hardcover edition
- Author: David Baldacci
- Language: English
- Series: Will Robie
- Genre: Thriller novel
- Publisher: Grand Central Publishing
- Publication date: April 22, 2014
- Publication place: United States
- Media type: Print, e-book, audiobook
- Pages: 432 pp.
- ISBN: 978-1455521203
- Preceded by: The Hit
- Followed by: The Guilty

The Target is a thriller novel written by David Baldacci. It is the third installment to feature Will Robie, a highly skilled U.S. Government assassin. The book was initially published on 22 April 2014 by Grand Central Publishing.
