= Atkinson, Nebraska =

- City
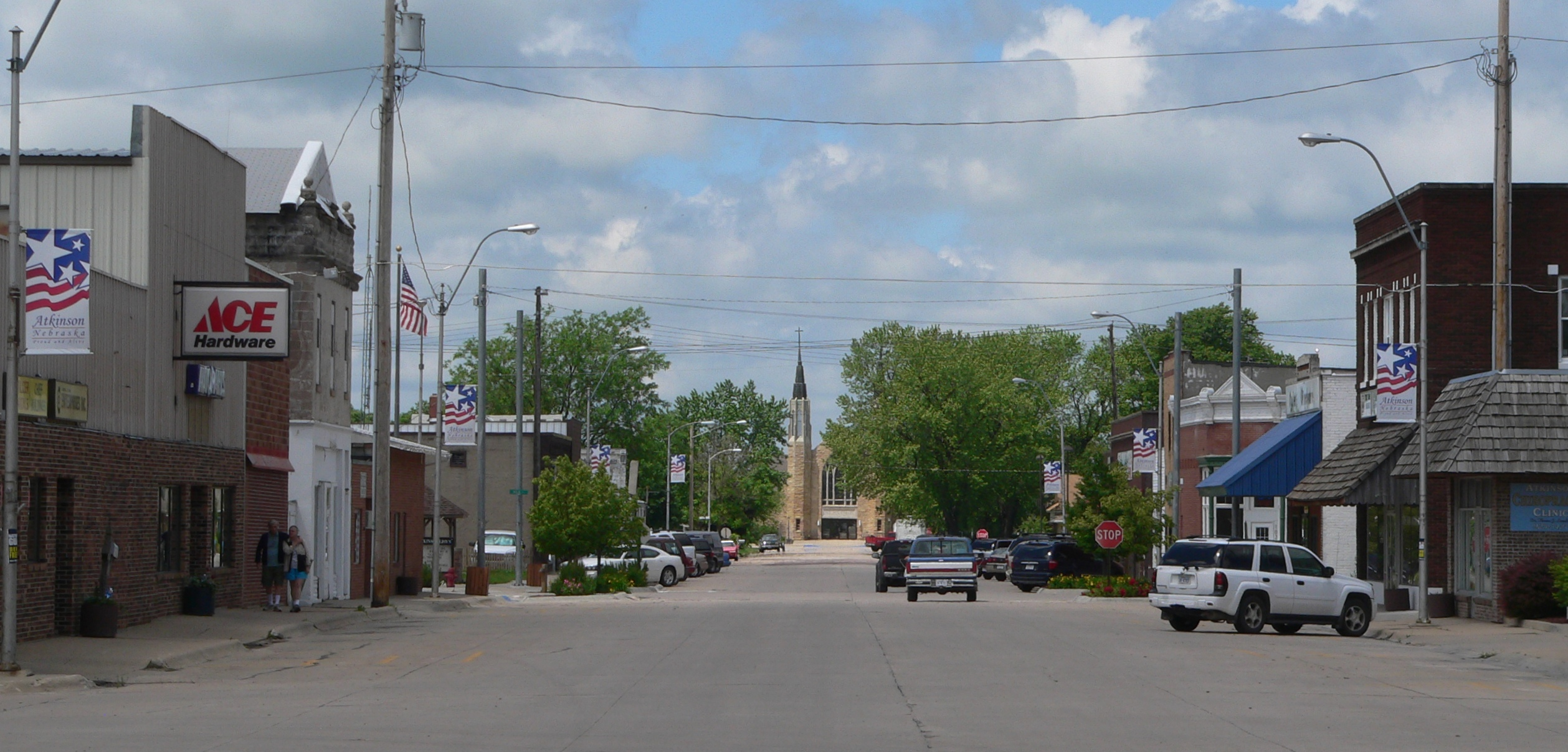
- Downtown Atkinson: State Street

- Location of Atkinson, Nebraska
- Coordinates: 42°31′51″N 98°58′29″W
- Country: United States
- State: Nebraska
- County: Holt

Area
  - Total: 1.64 sq mi (4.24 km^{2})
  - Land: 1.64 sq mi (4.24 km^{2})
  - Water: 0 sq mi (0.00 km^{2})
- Elevation: 2,106 ft (642 m)

Population (2020)
  - Total: 1,306
  - Density: 798.3/sq mi (308.21/km^{2})
- Time zone: UTC-6 (Central (CST))
  - Summer (DST): UTC-5 (CDT)
- ZIP code: 68713
- Area code: 402
- FIPS code: 31-02550
- GNIS feature ID: 2394013
- Website: http://www.atkinsonne.com/

Atkinson is a city in Holt County, Nebraska, United States. The population was 1,306 at the 2020 census.

== History ==
The first settlement at Atkinson was made circa 1875. Atkinson was platted in 1880, when the railroad was extended to that point. It was named for Col. John Atkinson, an original owner of the town site.

== Geography ==
According to the United States Census Bureau, the city has a total area of 1.63 square miles (4.22 km^{2}), all land.

=== Climate ===
Climate data for Atkinson 3SW, Nebraska (1991–2020 normals, extremes 1906–present)
Month	Jan	Feb	Mar	Apr	May	Jun	Jul	Aug	Sep	Oct	Nov	Dec	Year
Record high °F (°C)	72 (22)	77 (25)	92 (33)	98 (37)	98 (37)	107 (42)	112 (44)	109 (43)	106 (41)	99 (37)	83 (28)	73 (23)	112 (44)
Mean maximum °F (°C)	58.4 (14.7)	63.0 (17.2)	74.8 (23.8)	83.0 (28.3)	89.1 (31.7)	94.6 (34.8)	100.1 (37.8)	97.6 (36.4)	93.2 (34.0)	84.8 (29.3)	72.7 (22.6)	59.4 (15.2)	100.1 (37.8)
Mean daily maximum °F (°C)	32.0 (0.0)	35.3 (1.8)	46.9 (8.3)	57.7 (14.3)	68.9 (20.5)	79.5 (26.4)	86.0 (30.0)	83.5 (28.6)	75.8 (24.3)	61.3 (16.3)	46.9 (8.3)	34.2 (1.2)	59.0 (15.0)
Daily mean °F (°C)	21.1 (−6.1)	24.2 (−4.3)	34.9 (1.6)	45.8 (7.7)	57.5 (14.2)	68.0 (20.0)	73.8 (23.2)	71.4 (21.9)	63.0 (17.2)	48.6 (9.2)	35.3 (1.8)	24.1 (−4.4)	47.3 (8.5)
Mean daily minimum °F (°C)	10.2 (−12.1)	13.1 (−10.5)	22.8 (−5.1)	33.9 (1.1)	46.1 (7.8)	56.6 (13.7)	61.7 (16.5)	59.3 (15.2)	50.2 (10.1)	36.0 (2.2)	23.7 (−4.6)	13.9 (−10.1)	35.6 (2.0)
Mean minimum °F (°C)	−9.4 (−23.0)	−5.9 (−21.1)	3.2 (−16.0)	19.4 (−7.0)	32.2 (0.1)	45.7 (7.6)	51.6 (10.9)	48.9 (9.4)	34.9 (1.6)	20.2 (−6.6)	5.7 (−14.6)	−5.4 (−20.8)	−14.8 (−26.0)
Record low °F (°C)	−35 (−37)	−33 (−36)	−18 (−28)	−6 (−21)	18 (−8)	35 (2)	41 (5)	34 (1)	14 (−10)	−1 (−18)	−18 (−28)	−29 (−34)	−35 (−37)
Average precipitation inches (mm)	0.40 (10)	0.70 (18)	1.26 (32)	2.65 (67)	4.31 (109)	3.66 (93)	2.57 (65)	3.09 (78)	2.64 (67)	2.37 (60)	0.71 (18)	0.56 (14)	24.92 (633)
Average snowfall inches (cm)	5.5 (14)	6.7 (17)	5.1 (13)	4.1 (10)	0.2 (0.51)	0.0 (0.0)	0.0 (0.0)	0.0 (0.0)	0.0 (0.0)	1.5 (3.8)	4.0 (10)	6.2 (16)	33.3 (85)
Average precipitation days (≥ 0.01 in)	3.5	4.1	5.2	8.3	11.3	10.9	9.0	8.2	6.9	6.2	3.7	3.7	81.0
Average snowy days (≥ 0.1 in)	3.4	3.6	2.6	1.6	0.0	0.0	0.0	0.0	0.0	0.7	1.8	3.6	17.3
Source: NOAA

== Demographics ==
Historical population
Census	Pop.	Note	%±
1890	701		—
1900	595		−15.1%
1910	810		36.1%
1920	1,300		60.5%
1930	1,144		−12.0%
1940	1,350		18.0%
1950	1,372		1.6%
1960	1,324		−3.5%
1970	1,406		6.2%
1980	1,521		8.2%
1990	1,380		−9.3%
2000	1,244		−9.9%
2010	1,245		0.1%
2020	1,306		4.9%
U.S. Decennial Census

=== 2010 census ===
As of the census of 2010, there were 1,245 people, 549 households, and 322 families living in the city. The population density was 763.8 inhabitants per square mile (294.9/km^{2}). There were 638 housing units at an average density of 391.4 per square mile (151.1/km^{2}). The racial makeup of the city was 98.8% White, 0.2% African American, 0.6% Native American, 0.1% Pacific Islander, 0.2% from other races, and 0.2% from two or more races. Hispanic or Latino of any race were 0.5% of the population.

There were 549 households, of which 25.5% had children under the age of 18 living with them, 49.7% were married couples living together, 6.4% had a female householder with no husband present, 2.6% had a male householder with no wife present, and 41.3% were non-families. 38.6% of all households were made up of individuals, and 22.4% had someone living alone who was 65 years of age or older. The average household size was 2.19 and the average family size was 2.92.

The median age in the city was 46.1 years. 23.2% of residents were under the age of 18; 4.7% were between the ages of 18 and 24; 20.7% were from 25 to 44; 26.8% were from 45 to 64; and 24.3% were 65 years of age or older. The gender makeup of the city was 46.6% male and 53.4% female.

=== 2000 census ===
As of the census of 2000, there were 1,244 people, 537 households, and 322 families living in the city. The population density was 932.8 inhabitants per square mile (360.2/km^{2}). There were 640 housing units at an average density of 479.9 per square mile (185.3/km^{2}). The racial makeup of the city was 98.95% White, 0.08% African American, 0.08% Native American, 0.32% Asian, and 0.56% from two or more races. Hispanic or Latino of any race were 0.88% of the population.

There were 537 households, out of which 26.1% had children under the age of 18 living with them, 52.0% were married couples living together, 5.4% had a female householder with no husband present, and 40.0% were non-families. 36.7% of all households were made up of individuals, and 20.1% had someone living alone who was 65 years of age or older. The average household size was 2.20 and the average family size was 2.91.

In the city, the population was spread out, with 22.7% under the age of 18, 5.6% from 18 to 24, 23.4% from 25 to 44, 22.7% from 45 to 64, and 25.5% who were 65 years of age or older. The median age was 44 years. For every 100 females, there were 85.1 males. For every 100 females age 18 and over, there were 84.1 males.

As of 2000 the median income for a household in the city was $28,490, and the median income for a family was $36,094. Males had a median income of $22,500 versus $17,656 for females. The per capita income for the city was $17,085. About 10.0% of families and 14.6% of the population were below the poverty line, including 21.5% of those under age 18 and 11.9% of those age 65 or over.

== Arts and culture ==
Hay Days is the town's main celebration, a 3-4 day celebration that takes place every August. Started in the early 1900s to celebrate the end of hay harvest season, the event now includes dances, a parade, games in the park, duck races, and more.

== Education ==
Atkinson has one high school, West Holt High School. There is also a catholic school, St. Joseph Catholic School, which serves preschool through 8th grade.

== Notable people ==
- Jim Hendricks, folk musician
- Jack Hoffman, cancer patient and fundraiser
- Rodney L. Johnson, brigadier general in the United States Army
- Meagan Winings, Miss Nebraska Teen USA 2004 and Miss Nebraska USA 2009
