= Stone Cold (Baldacci novel) =

2007 novel by David Baldacci

- Hardcover edition
- Author: David Baldacci
- Language: English
- Series: Camel Club
- Genre: Crime novel
- Publisher: Grand Central Publishing
- Publication date: November 6, 2007
- Publication place: United States
- Media type: Print, e-book, audiobook
- Pages: 400 pp (hardback)
- ISBN: 978-0-4465-7739-7
- Preceded by: The Collectors
- Followed by: Divine Justice

Stone Cold is a crime thriller written by David Baldacci. This is the third book to feature the Camel Club, a small group of Washington, D.C. civilian misfits led by "Oliver Stone", an ex-Green Beret and a former CIA trained assassin. The book was initially published on November 6, 2007, by Grand Central Publishing.
