= Freddy and the French Fries =

Children's book series

Freddy and the French Fries is a series of books written by David Baldacci aimed at young readers. Two books have been published so far Fries Alive (2005) and The Mystery of Silas Finklebean (2008) both initially published by the Little, Brown and Company. Fries Alive is David Baldacci's debut novel for young readers. The book was negatively reviewed by Kirkus, saying that even "indiscriminate readers will find the hackneyed characters and trite, slow-moving plot unappetizing". The book was illustrated by Rudy Baldacci.
