= The Winner (novel) =

1997 novel by David Baldacci

- Hardcover edition
- Author: David Baldacci
- Language: English
- Genre: Thriller
- Publisher: Warner Books
- Publication date: December 2, 1997
- Publication place: United States
- Media type: Print, e-book, audiobook
- Pages: 513 pp (first edition)
- ISBN: 978-0-446-52259-5
- OCLC: 37513081
- Dewey Decimal: 813/.54 21
- LC Class: PS3552.A446 W56 1997

The Winner is a thriller novel by American author David Baldacci. The book was initially published on December 2, 1997, by Warner Books.

== Plot ==
The novel tells the story of LuAnn Tyler, a destitute mother living in a trailer park, who meets with Jackson, a man running a massive lottery scam from inside the National Lottery. He offers her a chance to win the lottery, which she initially refuses until she finds herself falsely accused of murder and needing to run for her life with her young daughter in tow. He rigs the lottery so that she wins $100,000,000, on the condition that she leaves the United States and never returns. When she secretly returns ten years later, Jackson comes to punish her for disobeying him, the FBI is searching for her in connection with the lottery scam, and her only help comes from the mysterious Matthew Riggs.

== Reception ==
Christopher Lehmann-Haupt writing for the New York Times enjoyed the premise and ending, but criticized the wooden characters, and the dragging plot.
