= Simple Genius =

Novel by David Baldacci

- Hardcover edition
- Author: David Baldacci
- Language: English
- Series: The third book in the King and Maxwell (book series)
- Genre: Thriller novel
- Publisher: Grand Central Publishing
- Publication date: April 24, 2007
- Publication place: United States
- Media type: Print, e-book, audiobook
- Pages: 420 (hardcover edition)
- ISBN: 978-0446580342
- Preceded by: Hour Game
- Followed by: First Family

Simple Genius is a thriller novel by American writer David Baldacci initially published on April 24, 2007, by Grand Central Publishing. It topped the New York Times bestseller list for the week ending April 28, 2007.

Simple Genius was described by the Pittsburgh Post-Gazette as "simply entertaining." Simple Genius continues the story of the characters Michelle Maxwell and Sean King from its predecessors, Split Second and Hour Game, and combines themes such as "quantum computers, protective codes, breaking those codes, the CIA, psychological demons, and even buried treasure."

== Plot summary ==
Sean King, financially hard-pressed and trying to help his professional and platonic partner Michelle Maxwell, is forced to seek an assignment from his ex-girlfriend Joan Dillinger, a fellow ex-Secret Service agent who runs her own private investigation agency.

Joan gives him a case based at a laboratory, investigating the murder of a scientist, Monk Turing. During his investigations, he stumbles on Camp Peary, the CIA training facility which leads him to a more complicated investigation, on which he works together with Michelle, who has attempted suicide after a psychological breakdown. He encounters Turing's autistic daughter, Viggie Turing, who is also extraordinary talented, but is willing to trust only Michelle, and hates Horatio, the psychologist who is treating both her and Michelle.

Eventually, Sean and Michelle solve the case, but not before being tortured by their enemies. Sean gains a treasure, but generously shares it with others even though he is in financial difficulties.

== Characters ==
- Michelle Maxwell: An ex-Secret Service agent, first featured in Split Second and again in Hour Game. She is the partner of Sean King. Dark hair, attractive, five feet ten inches tall (about 1.75m), an Olympic medalist in rowing and an expert in combat. However she is psychologically fragile, as is shown in Simple Genius, which describes her fight against her "inner demons".
- Sean King: Also an ex-Secret Service agent, Sean King is in his forties, six feet two (about 1.89m), and handsome. He is somewhat more controlled than Michelle and has had a relationship with another ex-Secret Service agent, Joan Dillinger, who continues to help him.

== Reception ==
Kirkus Reviews doubted the author's ability to maintain a spot on the bestsellers list, stating that the book is "Lamer than usual."
