= The Simple Truth =

Book by David Baldacci

- Hardcover edition
- Author: David Baldacci
- Language: English
- Genre: Crime novel
- Publisher: Grand Central Publishing
- Publication date: November 18, 1998
- Publication place: United States
- Media type: Print, e-book, audiobook
- Pages: 480 pp. (hardcover)
- ISBN: 978-0446523325

The Simple Truth is a crime novel written by David Baldacci. The book was initially published on November 18, 1998 by Grand Central Publishing.
