= The Last Mile (novel) =

2106 novel by David Baldacci

- Author: David Baldacci
- Language: English
- Genre: Thriller, Mystery fiction, Action Adventure
- Publisher: Grand Central Publishing (US)
- Publication date: April 19, 2016
- Publication place: United States
- Media type: Print (Hardback)
- Pages: 644 pp (first edition)
- ISBN: 978-1-455-56602-0

The Last Mile is a novel written by David Baldacci. The book was initially published on April 19, 2016 by Grand Central Publishing. It is a mystery novel in the Amos Decker series.

== Plot ==
Melvin Mars is a prisoner on death row for the crime of murdering both of his parents. After twenty years, another man confesses to the crime. Amos Decker, a former NFL player with an impeccable memory, and his FBI task force are hired to investigate why someone wants Mars out of prison.

== Reception ==
Kirkus Reviews called it "plodding" and "for die-hard Baldacci fans only".

Waka Tsunoda, writing for Associated Press, praised it for its "solid characters", "fast and furious" action, and addressing themes of racism, father-son relationships, and capital punishment.
