= Memory Man (novel) =

2015 novel by David Baldacci

- Hardcover edition
- Author: David Baldacci
- Language: English
- Series: Amos Decker
- Genre: Crime novel
- Publisher: Grand Central Publishing
- Publication date: September 15, 2015
- Publication place: United States
- Media type: Print, e-book, audiobook
- Pages: 432 pp (hardback)
- ISBN: 978-1455559817

Memory Man is a crime novel about a man whose wife, daughter and brother in law were murdered, written by David Baldacci. This is the first novel to feature the character Amos Decker. The novel was released in September 2015 by Grand Central Publishing.

== Plot ==
Amos Decker is a former professional football player who was violently hit on his first play, resulting in severe injuries and changes to his brain. As his football career has ended, Decker becomes a police officer, and later a successful detective, while using his newly acquired mental abilities (synesthesia and hyperthymesia). After his family is murdered in an unsolved case, Decker loses his will to live, and becomes a transient while working as a private investigator.

After a mass shooting at a local high school, Decker is asked to assist in solving the case by the local police force he used to work for. It soon becomes apparent that the shooting is somehow related to the killing of his family 18 months before.
