= King and Maxwell (novel) =

2013 novel by David Baldacci

- Hardcover edition
- Author: David Baldacci
- Language: English
- Series: The sixth book in the King and Maxwell (book series)
- Genre: Fiction
- Publisher: Grand Central Publishing
- Publication date: November 19, 2013
- Publication place: United States
- Media type: Print, e-book, audiobook
- Pages: 432 pp.
- ISBN: 978-1455576203
- Preceded by: The Sixth Man

King and Maxwell is a crime fiction novel written by American writer David Baldacci. This is the sixth and final installment in the King and Maxwell book series. The book was initially published on November 19, 2013, by Grand Central Publishing.

== Plot ==
Tyler Wingo, a teenage boy, learns the awful news that his father Sam, a soldier, was killed in action in Afghanistan. Then the extraordinary happens: Tyler receives a communication from Sam after his supposed death. Tyler hires Sean and Michelle to solve the mystery surrounding his father. But their investigation quickly leads to deeper, more troubling questions. Meanwhile, Sam arrives back to the USA only to discover that a corrupt organization led by Alan Grant wants vengeance on the president of the USA for one of the previous ones causing his parents' deaths 25 years ago.

At the climax, Alan kidnaps Tyler and his friend Kathy while also hacking the president's limousine (with Michelle and the president in it) to drive into the Potomac River. Michelle and the president survive via exploding an oxygen tank to get them out while Sean and Sam rescue Tyler and Kathy. Sean and Michelle confront Sean's ex-wife Dana's husband Curtis Brown. They reveal that Curtis was part of Alan's plot. Before they can arrest him, Alan arrives with a dynamite vest, and Curtis sacrifices himself to take him out. Dana is given compensation for Curtis's death while Tyler and Sam are allowed to live in peace.
