= The Sixth Man (novel) =

2011 novel by David Baldacci

- Hardcover edition
- Author: David Baldacci
- Language: English
- Series: The fifth book in the King and Maxwell (book series)
- Genre: Fiction
- Publisher: Grand Central Publishing
- Publication date: April 19, 2011
- Publication place: United States
- Media type: Print, e-book, audiobook
- Pages: 417 (hardcover edition)
- ISBN: 978-0446573108
- Preceded by: First Family
- Followed by: King and Maxwell

The Sixth Man is a crime fiction novel by American writer David Baldacci, initially published on April 19, 2011 by Grand Central Publishing. This is the fifth installment in the King and Maxwell book series.

== Plot summary ==
Sean King and Michelle Maxwell are called to help Edgar Roy, an alleged serial killer awaiting trial. Roy faces almost certain conviction. Roy’s attorney, Sean’s friend and mentor Ted Bergin, is set to meet with King and Maxwell to help work the case. But their investigation is derailed when Sean and Michelle find Bergin murdered on a quiet highway in New England. King and Maxwell uncover a secret government program which uses analysts to examine the combined intelligence government channels and offer strategic advice. Roy was the top such analyst. King and Maxwell are aided by Roy's half sister, a former spy. The trio uncover a conspiracy by the Secretary of Homeland Security to shut down the program and have Roy executed. The novel ends with Michelle waking from a coma after the final battle and Sean realizing how much their relationship meant to him.

== Characters ==
- Michelle Maxwell: An ex-Secret Service agent, featured first in Split Second and again in Hour Game and Simple Genius. She is the partner of Sean King. Dark hair, attractive, five feet ten inches tall (about 1.75m), an Olympic medalist in rowing and an expert in combat.
- Sean King: Also an ex-Secret Service agent, Sean King is in his forties, six feet two (about 1.88m), and handsome. King and Maxwell's relationship is portrayed as mostly platonic.

== Reception ==
Jeff Ayers called Baldacci "a master craftsman" in his review for the Associated Press, while Kirkus Reviews stated that the book has "more double-crosses than a tic-tac-toe tournament."
