= Mackenzie Foy =

American actress and model (born 2000)

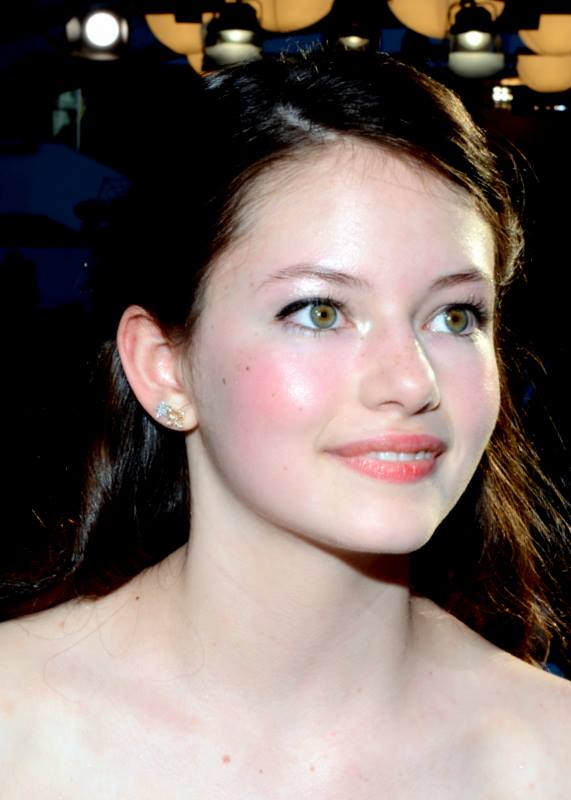
- Foy in 2015
- Born: Mackenzie Christine Foy; November 10, 2000 (age 26); Los Angeles, California, U.S.
- Occupations: Actress, model
- Years active: 2003–present

Mackenzie Christine Foy (born November 10, 2000) is an American actress and model. Her breakout role was as Renesmee Cullen in the 2012 film The Twilight Saga: Breaking Dawn – Part 2, which earned her a Young Artist Award nomination for Best Supporting Young Actress in a Feature Film. She is also known for portraying Cindy Perron in The Conjuring Universe and young Murph in Interstellar (2014), the latter earning her a Saturn Award for Best Performance by a Younger Actor, among other awards nominations. She has also starred in The Nutcracker and the Four Realms (2018) and Black Beauty (2020).

== Early life ==
Foy was born on November 10, 2000, in Los Angeles, California, where she was raised. Her father, a truck driver, and mother, a homemaker, had no connections to the film industry. Foy began modeling at age 3, and started acting at age 8. She is a practitioner of Taekwondo.

== Career ==
Foy began modeling in print ads in 2004, working for Garnet Hill, Polo Ralph Lauren and Guess. From there, she modeled for companies such as the Walt Disney Company, Mattel and Gap.

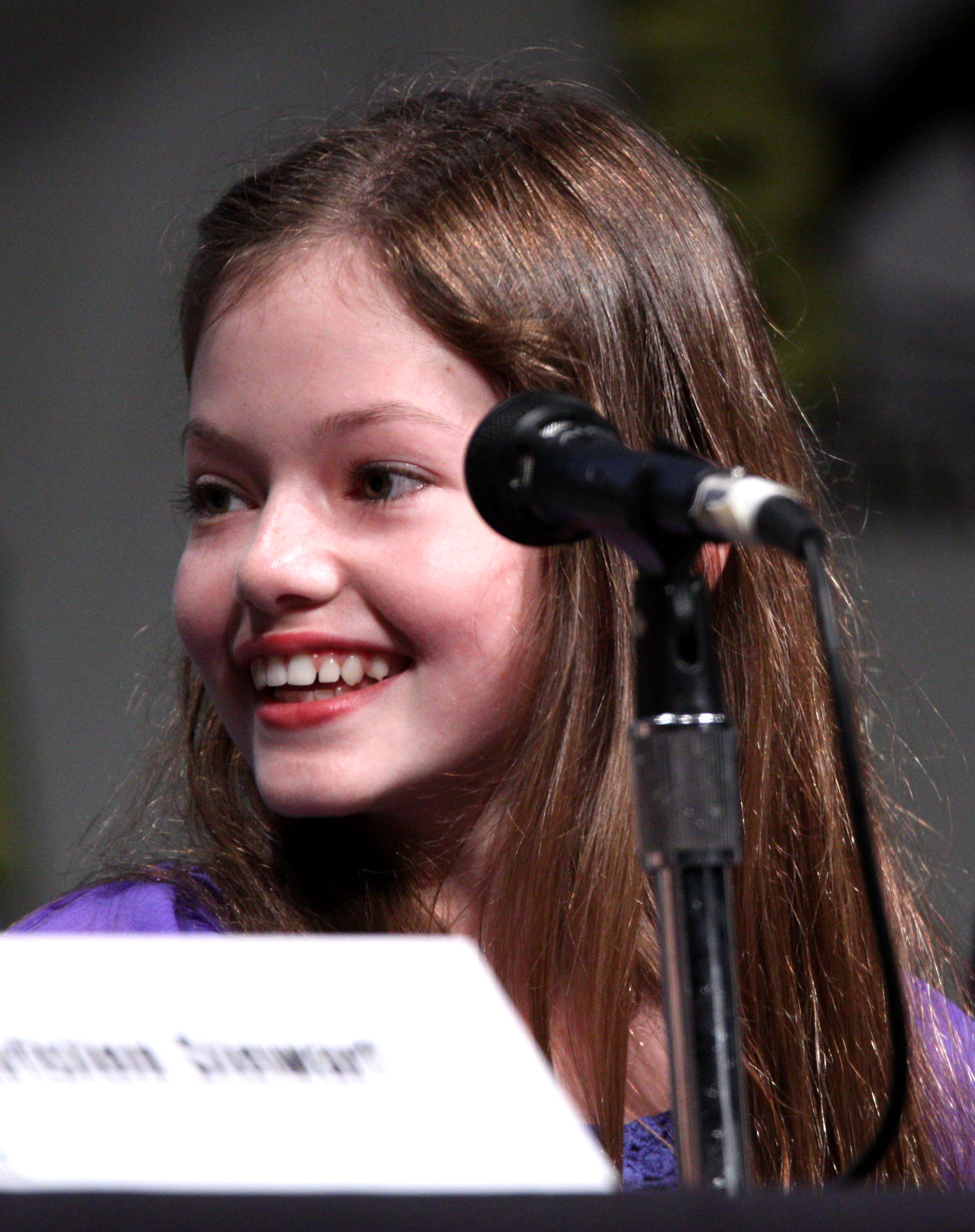
Mackenzie Foy at the 2012 San Diego Comic-Con

Foy's acting career began when she was eight years old, when she guest-starred in television shows such as 'Til Death, FlashForward and Hawaii Five-0. In 2010, she was cast as Renesmee Cullen in the film adaptation of Stephenie Meyer's book Breaking Dawn, the fourth and final novel in the Twilight saga series. The first movie, The Twilight Saga: Breaking Dawn – Part 1, in which Renesmee is shown only in a flash-forward, was released on November 18, 2011, while the second, The Twilight Saga: Breaking Dawn – Part 2, on November 16, 2012.

In February 2012, she joined the cast of James Wan's horror film The Conjuring. Shooting on the film began in February 2012 in North Carolina, and it was released in July 2013. In February, she was also in the last episode of the second season of the horror TV series R. L. Stine's The Haunting Hour, in which she played Natalie, a girl who goes to live with her grandfather and discovers that a doll she was given, is alive and has bad intentions.

On October 10, 2012, Foy joined Wagner on tour and Wish You Well, the film adaptation of David Baldacci's book, where she played the lead. On November 17, 2012, Foy was in another episode of R. L. Stine's The Haunting Hour, playing Georgia Lomin. In 2014, Foy appeared in Erica Dunton's movie Black Eyed Dog.

Foy pormoting The Nutcracker And the Four Realms, 2018

Foy co-starred as the childhood version of Matthew McConaughey's daughter in Christopher Nolan's Interstellar. She provided the voice of Celestine in the English dub of Ernest & Celestine (2012), Violet in The Boxcar Children (2014) and The Little Girl in The Little Prince (2015). In July 2016, it was announced that Foy would play the lead role of Clara in the film The Nutcracker and the Four Realms.

In May 2019 it was announced that Foy would co-star with Kate Winslet in a new adaptation of Black Beauty, which was filmed in the fall of 2019 and was released in 2020.

In December 2024, it was reported that Foy would appear alongside Sean Bean and Odeya Rush in The Isolate Thief, directed by John Suits.

== Filmography ==
Key
†	Denotes films that have not yet been released

=== Film ===
Year	Title	Role	Notes
2011	The Twilight Saga: Breaking Dawn – Part 1	Renesmee Cullen	
2012	The Twilight Saga: Breaking Dawn – Part 2	Renesmee Cullen	
2013	The Conjuring	Cindy Perron	
2013	Wish You Well	Lou Cardinal	
2014	Ernest & Celestine	Celestine (voice)	
2014	The Boxcar Children	Violet (voice)	
2014	Black Eyed Dog	Daisy Krauser	
2014	Interstellar	Young Murphy "Murph" Cooper	
2015	The Little Prince	The Little Girl (voice)	
2018	The Nutcracker and the Four Realms	Clara Stahlbaum	
2020	Black Beauty	Jo Green	
2025	The Conjuring: Last Rites	Cindy Perron	Cameo
2026	The Isolate Thief		Completed

=== Television ===
Year	Title	Role	Notes
2009	'Til Death	Little Girl	Episode: "No Complaints"
2010	FlashForward	Kate Erskine	Episode: "Blowback"
2010	Hawaii Five-0	Lily Wilson	Episode: "Ho'apono"
2012	R. L. Stine's The Haunting Hour: The Series	Natalie / Georgia Lomin	Guest role; 2 episodes
2014	The Cookie Mobster	Sally	TV movie
2015	Jesse Stone: Lost in Paradise	Jenny O'Neill	TV movie

== Awards and nominations ==
Association	Year (Note: Indicates the year of ceremony. Each year is linked to the article about the awards held that year, wherever possible.)	Category	Work	Result	Refs
Young Artist Award	2013	Best Performance in a Feature Film – Supporting Young Actress	The Twilight Saga: Breaking Dawn – Part 2	Nominated	
Washington D.C. Area Film Critics Association	2014	Best Youth Performance	Interstellar	Nominated	
St. Louis Film Critics Association	2014	Best Supporting Actress	Interstellar	Nominated	
Critics' Choice Movie Awards	2014	Best Young Performer	Interstellar	Nominated	
Saturn Award	2015	Best Performance by a Younger Actor	Interstellar	Won	
Teen Choice Awards	2015	Choice Movie Actress – Sci-Fi/Fantasy	Interstellar	Nominated	
