= Zero Day (novel) =

Novel by David Baldacci

- Hardcover edition
- Author: David Baldacci
- Language: English
- Series: John Puller
- Genre: Thriller novel
- Publisher: Grand Central Publishing
- Publication date: November 16, 2011
- Publication place: United States
- Media type: Print, e-book, audiobook
- Pages: 656 pp. (hardback)
- ISBN: 978-1455504145
- Followed by: The Forgotten

Zero Day is a thriller novel written by David Baldacci. It is the first installment in the John Puller book series. The book was initially published on November 16, 2011, by Grand Central Publishing.
