= The Escape (Baldacci novel) =

2014 novel by David Baldacci

- Hardcover edition
- Author: David Baldacci
- Language: English
- Series: John Puller
- Genre: Thriller novel
- Publisher: Grand Central Publishing
- Publication date: November 18, 2014
- Publication place: United States
- Media type: Print, e-book, audiobook
- Pages: 480 pp.
- ISBN: 978-1455521197
- Preceded by: The Forgotten
- Followed by: No Man's Land

The Escape is a thriller novel written by American author David Baldacci. This is the third installment in the John Puller book series. The book was initially published on November 18, 2014 by Grand Central Publishing. In this novel Puller, a former Army Ranger who served at Iraq and Afghanistan and now works for the U.S. Army’s Criminal Investigations Division, has to hunt down the most formidable and brilliant prey he has ever tracked: his own brother, Robert.

== Reception ==
According to Reuters, The Escape was #1 on the U.S best-seller list on November 26, 2014.
