= Wish You Well (film) =

2013 film by Darnell Martin

Wish You Well is a 2013 family film directed by Darnell Martin, written by David Baldacci from his 2001 novel of the same name, and starring Mackenzie Foy, Josh Lucas and Ellen Burstyn and JP Vanderloo. The movie is set in rural Virginia and follows Lou and her younger brother Oz who are forced to move to their great-grandmother's farm following a tragic accident which killed their father and severely injured their mother.

While living on the farm, Lou dreams of following her father's footsteps as a writer while her great-grandmother Louisa Mae tries to stop a coal and gas company from taking her family farm. The supporting cast features Ned Bellamy and Laura Fraser, the cinematographer was Frank Prinzi, and the music was by Paul Cantelon. The film was set and shot in Giles County, Virginia, near the southeastern border of West Virginia.

== Cast ==
- Mackenzie Foy as Lou Cardinal
- Josh Lucas as Cotton Longfellow
- Ellen Burstyn as Louisa Mae Cardinal
- Ned Bellamy as George Davis
- JP Vanderloo as Oz Cardinal
- Alano Miller as Eugene Randall
- Seamus Davey-Fitzpatrick as Diamond Skinner
- Antonio Ducrot as Billy Davis
- Laura Fraser as Amanda Cardinal
