= Long Shadows (Baldacci novel) =

2022 novel by David Baldacci

First edition

Long Shadows is a 2022 American crime thriller written by David Baldacci and published by Grand Central Publishing. It is the author's 51st crime book and 7th in the Memory Man/Amos Decker series, which features an eponymous detective as the central character. The novel was ranked as the New York Times Best Seller in October 2022.

== Reviews ==
The book received positive reviews from Kirkus Reviews and other independent book reviewers.
