= True Blue (novel) =

2009 novel by David Baldacci

- Hardcover edition
- Author: David Baldacci
- Language: English
- Genre: Crime novel
- Publisher: Grand Central Publishing
- Publication date: October 27, 2009
- Publication place: United States
- Media type: Print, e-book, audiobook
- Pages: 464 pgs. (hardback)
- ISBN: 0446195510

True Blue is a crime novel written by David Baldacci. The book was initially published on October 27, 2009, by Grand Central Publishing. The novel focuses on Mason "Mace" Perry, who once was a cop with the D.C. police, but was kidnapped and framed for a crime she did not commit. Now she is released from prison and tries to be a cop once again.
