= First Family (novel) =

2009 novel by David Baldacci

- Hardcover edition
- Author: David Baldacci
- Language: English
- Series: The fourth book in the King and Maxwell (book series)
- Genre: Fiction
- Publisher: Grand Central Publishing
- Publication date: April 21, 2009
- Publication place: United States
- Media type: Print, e-book, audiobook
- Pages: 464 pp.
- ISBN: 978-0446539753
- Preceded by: Simple Genius
- Followed by: The Sixth Man

First Family is a crime fiction novel written by the American writer David Baldacci. This is the fourth installment in the King and Maxwell book series. The book was published on April 21, 2009, by Grand Central Publishing. An audiobook narrated by Ron McLarty was released in May 2009.
