= David Baldacci =

American novelist (born 1960)

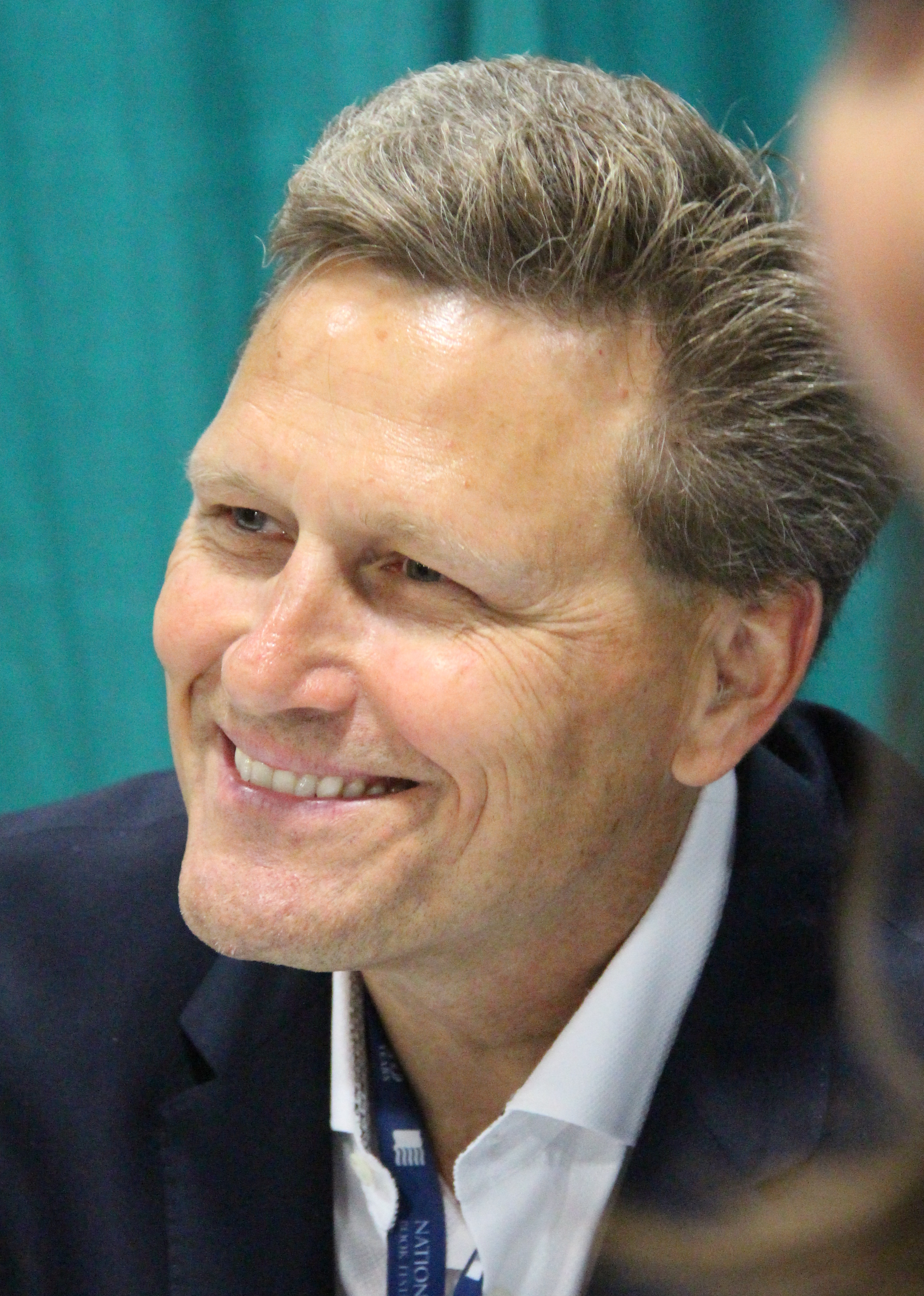
- Baldacci at the 2015 National Book Festival
- Born: August 5, 1960 (age 66); Richmond, Virginia, U.S.
- Education: Virginia Commonwealth University (BA); University of Virginia (JD)
- Occupation: Novelist
- Spouse: Michelle Collin (m. 1990)
- Children: 2
- Relatives: John Baldacci (second cousin)
- Writing career
- Period: 1996–present
- Genres: Thrillers, children's literature
- Notable work: Absolute Power
- Website: www.davidbaldacci.com

David Baldacci (born August 5, 1960) is an American novelist. An attorney by education, Baldacci writes mainly suspense novels and legal thrillers. His novels are published in over 45 languages and published in over 80 countries, having sold over 130 million copies worldwide.

== Early life and education ==
David Baldacci was born and raised in Richmond, Virginia. He is of Italian descent. He graduated from Henrico High School and earned a B.A. in political science from Virginia Commonwealth University and a Juris Doctor from the University of Virginia School of Law, after which he practiced law for nine years in Washington, D.C.

== Career ==
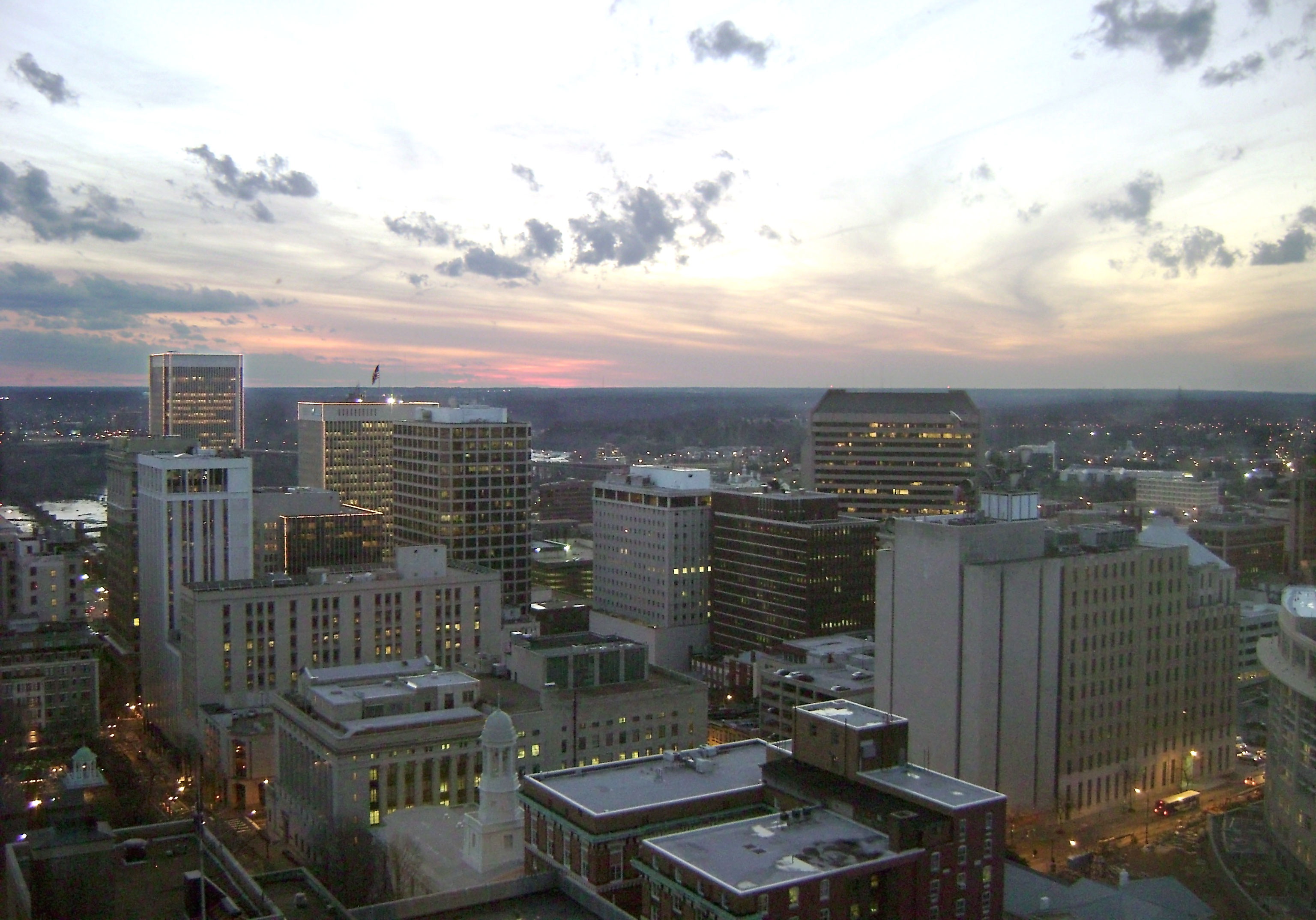
Richmond, Virginia, hometown of Baldacci

Baldacci began writing stories as a child when his mother gave him a notebook in which to record them. He wrote for more than two decades, penning short stories and later screenplays, without much success.

While practicing law, he turned to novel writing, taking three years to write Absolute Power. Published in 1996, it was an international best-seller. To date, Baldacci has published 50 novels for adults as well as seven novels for younger readers.

== Personal life and philanthropy ==
Baldacci lives in Fairfax County, Virginia, with his family. He has a daughter and a son. He is second cousins with John Baldacci, who served as governor of Maine from 2003 to 2011.

Baldacci and his wife, Michelle, founded the Wish You Well Foundation, which works to combat illiteracy in the United States by funding adult literacy programs. Baldacci became involved with the National Multiple Sclerosis Society after his sister, author Sharon Baldacci, was diagnosed with MS. In 2008 the Foundation partnered with Feeding America to launch Feeding Body & Mind.

Baldacci has served for more than a decade on the board of trustees of the Mark Twain House & Museum in Hartford, Connecticut. In 2019, he donated $1 million to the home.

== Works ==
Baldacci's first novel, Absolute Power, tells the story of a fictional American president and his Secret Service agents who are willing to commit murder in order to cover up the accidental death of a woman with whom the President was having an affair. It was adapted as a film, Absolute Power (1997), starring Clint Eastwood and Gene Hackman.

Baldacci wrote the screenplay for the film adaptation of his novel Wish You Well; the movie was shot on location in southwest Virginia with Academy Award winner Ellen Burstyn, Josh Lucas, and Mackenzie Foy in the lead roles.

Baldacci was a consulting producer on King & Maxwell, a TNT television series based on his characters Sean King and Michelle Maxwell. Jon Tenney and Rebecca Romijn starred.

The Christmas Train, Baldacci's eighth novel, was adapted in 2017 by Hallmark Channel as a Hallmark Hall of Fame feature presentation. The TV movie starred Dermot Mulroney, Kimberly Williams-Paisley, Danny Glover and Joan Cusack and was directed by Ron Oliver.

Baldacci's novel One Summer was adapted in 2021 for Hallmark Movies & Mysteries and starred Sam Page, Sarah Drew and Amanda Schull.

Baldacci's novels have been published in over 45 languages and in more than 80 countries, with over 150 million worldwide sales as of December 2024.

== Published works ==
=== Sean King and Michelle Maxwell series ===
1. Split Second (2003)
2. Hour Game (2004)
3. Simple Genius (2007)
4. First Family (2009)
5. The Sixth Man (2011)
6. King and Maxwell (2013)

=== The Camel Club series ===
1. The Camel Club (2005)
2. The Collectors (2006)
3. Stone Cold (2007)
4. Divine Justice (2008)
5. Hell's Corner (2010)

=== A. Shaw series ===
Shaw is an enigmatic intelligence operative.

1. The Whole Truth (2008)
2. Deliver Us From Evil (2010)

=== John Puller series ===
Puller is a US Army veteran and CID military investigator.

1. Zero Day (2011)
2. The Forgotten (2012)
3. The Escape (2014)
4. No Man's Land (2016)
5. Daylight (2020, Atlee Pine crossover)

=== Will Robie series ===
In this series, Robie is a seasoned and highly skilled hitman.

1. The Innocent (2012)
2. The Hit (2013)
3. The Target (2014)
4. The Guilty (2015)
5. End Game (2017)

=== Amos Decker series ===
Decker is a veteran police detective turned FBI consultant. He has hyperthymesia which has left him with perfect recall.

1. Memory Man (2015)
2. The Last Mile (2016)
3. The Fix (2017)
4. The Fallen (2018)
5. Redemption (2019)
6. Walk The Wire (2020)
7. Long Shadows (2022)

=== Atlee Pine series ===
An FBI agent searching for her abducted sister.

1. Long Road to Mercy (2018)
2. A Minute to Midnight (2019)
3. Daylight (2020, John Puller crossover)
4. Mercy (2021)

=== Aloysius Archer series ===
1. One Good Deed (2019)
2. A Gambling Man (2021)
3. Dream Town (2022)

=== Travis Devine series ===
1. The 6:20 Man (2022)
2. The Edge (2023)
3. To Die For (2024)
4. All In (2026)

=== Mickey Gibson series ===
1. Simply Lies (2023)

=== Walter Nash series ===
1. Nash Falls (2025)
2. Hope Rises (2026)

=== Stand-alone novels ===
- Absolute Power (1996)
- Total Control (1997)
- The Winner (1998)
- The Simple Truth (1998)
- Saving Faith (1999)
- Wish You Well (2001)
- Last Man Standing (2001)
- The Christmas Train (2003)
- True Blue (2009)
- One Summer (2011)
- A Calamity of Souls (2024)
- Strangers in Time (2025)

=== Short stories and novellas ===
- Waiting for Santa (short story) (2002)
- No Time Left (short story) (2012)
- Bullseye (short story) Will Robie / Camel Club (2014)
- The Mighty Johns also known as The Final Play (novella) (2021)

=== For young readers ===
==== Freddy and the French Fries series ====
1. Freddy and the French Fries: Fries Alive! (Little, Brown and Company, 2005), Baldacci's debut novel for young readers
2. Freddy and the French Fries: The Mystery of Silas Finklebean (Little, Brown and Company, 2006)

==== The 39 Clues series ====
- Day of Doom (Scholastic Publishing, 2013), Book 6 in the "Cahills vs. Vespers" series of The 39 Clues books

==== Vega Jane series ====
1. The Finisher (Scholastic Press, 2014), published in the U.K. as The Secrets of Sorcery
2. The Keeper (Scholastic Press, 2015), published in the U.K. as The Maze of Monsters
3. The Width of the World (Scholastic Press, 2017), published in the U.K. as The Rebels' Revolt
4. The Stars Below (Scholastic Press, 2019), published in the U.K. as The End of Time

== Adaptations ==
- Absolute Power (1997 film), starring Clint Eastwood, Gene Hackman, and Ed Harris
- King & Maxwell (2013 TV series), starring Jon Tenney and Rebecca Romijn
- Wish You Well (2013 film), starring Mackenzie Foy, Josh Lucas, and Ellen Burstyn
- The Christmas Train (2017 film), starring Dermot Mulroney, Kimberly Williams-Paisley, Danny Glover and Joan Cusack
- One Summer (2021 film), starring Sam Page, Sarah Drew and Amanda Schull

== Awards ==
| Work | Year & Award | Category | Result | Ref. |
|---|---|---|---|---|
| The Winner | 1999 Kurd Laßwitz Award | Foreign Work | Nominated | |
| Hour Game | 2005 Library of Virginia | Virginia Literary Awards (Fiction) | Won | |
| The Sixth Man | 2012 Library of Virginia | Virginia Literary Awards (Fiction) | Won | |
| King and Maxwell | 2014 Library of Virginia | Virginia Literary Awards (Fiction) | Won | |
| The Hit | 2014 Audie Awards | Thriller or Suspense | Won | |
| One Good Deed | 2020 Nero Award | | Won | |
| One Good Deed | 2020 International Thriller Writers Awards | Hardcover Novel | Nominated | |
| | 2008 International Thriller Writers Awards | Silver Bullet Award | Won | |
| | 2011 Crime Thriller Awards | The People's Bestseller Dagger | Won | |
| | 2017 Library of Virginia | Virginia Literary Awards (Lifetime Achievement) | Won | |
| | 2024 PEN/Faulkner Foundation | PEN/Faulkner Literary Champion | Won | |
