= List of members of the Sons of the American Revolution =

The Sons of the American Revolution (SAR) is a United States patriotic and lineage organization founded in 1889. The following is a list of distinguished members since the organization's founding.

== National leaders ==
=== Presidents of the United States ===
To date, 17 presidents of the United States have been members of the SAR. President Grant was admitted posthumously in recognition of his being a member of the Sons of Revolutionary Sires, whose members were later admitted to membership in the SAR.

- Ulysses S. Grant (18th President; 1869–1877) (posthumously)
- Rutherford B. Hayes (19th President; 1877–1881)
- Benjamin Harrison (23rd President; 1889–1893)
- William McKinley (25th President; 1897–1901)
- Theodore Roosevelt (26th President; 1901–1909)
- William Howard Taft (27th President; 1909–1913)
- Warren G. Harding (29th President; 1921–1923)
- Calvin Coolidge (30th President; 1923–1929)
- Herbert Hoover (31st President; 1929–1933)
- Franklin D. Roosevelt (32nd President; 1933–1945)
- Harry S. Truman (33rd President; 1945–1953)
- Dwight D. Eisenhower (34th President; 1953–1961)
- Lyndon B. Johnson (36th President; 1963–1969)
- Gerald R. "Jerry" Ford (38th President; 1974–1977)
- James Earl "Jimmy" Carter (39th President; 1977–1981)
- George H. W. Bush (41st President; 1989–1993)
- George W. Bush (43rd President; 1991–2009)

Of the presidents who lived since the SAR's founding in 1889 and are not listed above, presidents Grover Cleveland, Richard Nixon, Bill Clinton, Barack Obama, and Joe Biden all had patriot ancestors but did not join the SAR. Presidents Woodrow Wilson, John F. Kennedy, Ronald Reagan, and Donald Trump did not have ancestors in the United States at the time of the Revolution.

President Joe Biden, then a United States Senator, was awarded a Gold Good Citizenship Medal by The Delaware Society of the Sons of the American Revolution in 1999. Other presidents who received the Gold Good Citizenship Medal include Harry Truman, Dwight Eisenhower, Ronald Reagan, George H. W. Bush and George W. Bush.

Of the 22 presidents who served prior to the founding of the SAR in 1889, six qualify as patriot ancestors – George Washington, John Adams, Thomas Jefferson, James Madison, James Monroe and Andrew Jackson. Two others, Grant and Hayes, were members of SAR. Of the remaining 14, all except for Martin Van Buren had patriot ancestors.

=== Vice presidents of the United States ===
- Charles G. Dawes (22nd Vice President; 1889–1893)
- Levi P. Morton (30th Vice President; 1925–1929)
- Nelson Rockefeller (41st Vice President; 1974–1977)

In addition to the above, presidents Theodore Roosevelt, Calvin Coolidge, Harry Truman, Lyndon Johnson, Gerald Ford and George H.W. Bush all served as vice-president before becoming president.

== Nobel Prize recipients ==
=== Nobel Peace Prize recipients ===
- President Theodore Roosevelt
- President Jimmy Carter
- Vice President Charles G. Dawes
- Secretary of State Elihu Root
- Secretary of State Frank B. Kellogg

=== Nobel Prize for Literature recipient ===
- Sir Winston Churchill

== Military ==
=== Medal of Honor recipients ===
The following 43 SAR Compatriots are known to have received the United States Congressional Medal of Honor. It is possible that there are other Medal of Honor recipients who were SAR Compatriots. The number recipients for each conflict is as follows: Civil War – 17, Indian Wars – 6, Spanish–American War – 1, Philippines – 2, Vera Cruz – 1, Peacetime – 3, World War II – 8, Korea - 2, Vietnam – 3. Only two of these recipients, Major General Patrick Brady and Captain Gary M. Rose, are living as of 2025.

This link is the National Society of the Sons of the American Revolution Medal of Honor Recipient timeline: https://www.sar.org/sar-compatriot-medal-of-honor-recipients/

(The rank indicated is the highest held by the individual and not necessarily that held at the time the Medal of Honor was earned or awarded.)

==== Civil War ====
- Lieutenant General Nelson A. Miles, USA – U.S. Army Commanding General, 1895–1903.
- Major General Theodore S. Peck, VTNG – Adjutant General of Vermont
- Major General William R. Shafter, USA – Commanded the Fifth Army Corps during the Siege of Santiago.
- Major General David S. Stanley, USV – hero of the Battle of Franklin during the Civil War.
- Brevet Major General Lewis Addison Grant, USV – Assistant Secretary of War.
- Brevet Major General Rufus Saxton, USV – Defended Harper's Ferry during the Civil War.
- Brevet Major General Orlando Willcox, USA – Wounded in action at the Battle of Bull Run.
- Brigadier General Horatio Collins King, NYNG - Received Medal of Honor for actions near Dinwiddie Courthouse.
- Brigadier General Edmund Rice, USA – Earned the Medal of Honor at the Battle of Gettysburg.
- Brevet Brigadier General Byron Mac Cutcheon, USV – Brigade commander during the Civil War.
- Brevet Brigadier General Horace Porter, USV – President General of the SAR from 1892 to 1897.
- Brevet Brigadier General Philip S. Post, USV – Civil War veteran and U.S. Representative.
- Brevet Brigadier General Edward W. Whitaker, USV – Cavalry officer during the Civil War.
- Brevet Colonel Clinton A. Cilley, USV - Received the Medal of Honor for actions at the Battle of Chickamauga.
- Brevet Lieutenant Colonel George G. Benedict, USV - Received Medal of Honor for actions at the Battle of Gettysburg.
- Brevet Major Ira H. Evans, USV - Received the Medal of Honor for heroism at the Battle of Hatcher's Run in Virginia.
- Captain George Washington Brush, USV – Commanded a company of the 34th United States Colored Troops (USCT).

==== Indian Wars ====
- Brigadier General John B. Babcock, USA – Veteran of the Civil War and earned the Medal of Honor during the Indian Wars.
- Brigadier General Oscar F. Long, USA – Served in the campaign against Chief Joseph.
- Colonel John C. Gresham, USA - received the Medal of Honor for actions at Wounded Knee.
- Colonel Charles H. Heyl, USA - received the Medal of Honor for actions against hostile Indians.
- Lieutenant Colonel John O. Skinner, USA - Received Medal of Honor for actions against hostile Indians while serving as a civilian contract surgeon.
- First Lieutenant Powhatan H. Clarke, USA – Commanded African-American Cavalrymen (a.k.a. "Buffalo Soldiers") against Apache Indians.

==== Spanish-American War ====
- Colonel Theodore Roosevelt, USV (posthumous recipient) - Only person to receive both the Medal of Honor and the Nobel Peace Prize.

==== Philippine Insurrection ====
- Lieutenant Colonel Bernard A. Byrne, USV - Received the Medal of Honor for heroic actions in the Philippines.
- Major John Alexander Logan Jr., USV (posthumous recipient) - Died during his Medal of Honor action in the Philippines.

==== Vera Cruz ====
- Admiral Frank F. Fletcher, USN - Commander of the Vera Cruz expedition.

==== Peacetime (non-combat) ====
- Major General Adolphus Greely, USA – Civil War veteran and Arctic explorer.
- Rear Admiral Richard E. Byrd Jr., USN – Awarded Medal of Honor for first flight over the North Pole.
- Lieutenant William Lowell Hill, USN – Awarded Medal of Honor for rescuing a sailor from drowning.

==== World War II ====
- General of the Army Douglas MacArthur, USA – Legendary general (General MacArthur approved an SAR service medal, the Patriot Medal, bearing his likeness, and was the first recipient following his death in 1964.)
- General Jonathan Wainwright, USA – Commanded the defense of the Philippines.
- Brigadier General Theodore Roosevelt Jr., AUS (posthumous recipient) – Landed at Utah Beach on D-Day.
- Brigadier General Joseph Foss, SDANG – Marine fighter pilot on Guadalcanal and Governor of South Dakota.
- Major Robert Hugo Dunlap, USMC – Commanded a company of Marines at Iwo Jima.
- Chief Warrant Officer Hershel W. Williams, USMCR – Last surviving World War II Medal of Honor recipient.
- Technical Sergeant Charles H. Coolidge, USA – Infantry soldier who served in France during World War II.
- Sergeant John D. Hawk, USA – Earned the Medal of Honor at the Battle of the Falaise Pocket.

==== Korean War ====
- Colonel Ralph Puckett, Jr., USA
- Corporal Fred B. McGee, USA (posthumous recipient)

==== Vietnam ====
- Vice Admiral James Bond Stockdale, USN – Prisoner of War in Vietnam.
- Major General Patrick Brady, USA – Vietnam War helicopter pilot.
- Captain Gary Michael Rose, USA - Received the Medal of Honor for actions in Laos.

=== Military and naval officers ===
- Admiral of the Navy George Dewey – Hero of the Battle of Manila Bay
- General of the Armies Ulysses S. Grant – Commanding General of the Union Army and President of the United States
- General of the Armies John J. Pershing – U.S. Army Chief of Staff and commander of the American Expeditionary Force in the First World War
- General of the Army Dwight Eisenhower – Supreme Commander of Allied Forces Europe
- General of the Air Force Henry H. Arnold, USAF – Commander of the U.S. Army Air Force in World War II
- Fleet Admiral William F. Halsey – Commander of the 3rd Fleet in World War II
- General Joseph E. Johnston, CSA – Confederate general
- General Frederick Kroesen – Vice Chief of Staff of the United States Army
- General James N. Mattis, USMC – 26th Secretary of Defense and Commander the United States Joint Forces Command 2007 to 2010.
- General Charles P. Summerall – U.S. Army Chief of Staff and president of The Citadel
- General William C. Westmoreland – Commander of Military Assistance Command Vietnam (MACV)
- Admiral Thomas H. Moorer – Chairman of the Joint Chiefs of Staff
- Admiral David Dixon Porter – Senior admiral of the U.S. Navy from 1870 to 1891
- Admiral Harry D. Train II – NATO Supreme Allied Commander Atlantic
- Lieutenant General Simon B. Buckner, CSA – Veteran of the Civil War and Governor of Kentucky
- Lieutenant General Joseph Wheeler, CSA – Veteran of the Civil War and the Spanish–American War
- Lieutenant General Theodore G. Stroup, USA – Deputy Chief of Staff, Personnel
- Lieutenant General Guy Swan, USA – Commanding General, Fifth US Army
- Lieutenant General David H. Ohle, USA – Deputy Chief of Staff, Personnel
- Vice Admiral James Bond Stockdale, USN – President of the Naval War College
- Major General James A. Adkins, USA – 28th Adjutant General of Maryland
- Major General Thomas M. Anderson – Veteran of the Civil War, Spanish–American War and the Philippine Insurrection
- Major General Joseph Cabell Breckinridge Sr., USV – Veteran of the Civil War and the Spanish–American War
- Major General Donald Burdick, USA – Director, Army National Guard
- Major General Darius N. Couch, USV – Union Army general during the Civil War
- Major General George Crook, USA - Veteran of the Civil War and Indian campaigns.
- Major General Frederick D. Grant, USV – Son of President Ulysses S. Grant
- Major General Ulysses S. Grant III – Grandson of President Ulysses S. Grant
- Major General Curtis Guild Jr., MVM – Governor of Massachusetts
- Major General William Henry Fitzhugh Lee, CSA – Son of General Robert E. Lee
- Major General George Owen Squier USA, – Chief Signal Officer of the United States Army in World War I, inventor of telephone carrier multiplexing in 1910 and Muzak background music
- Rear Admiral Charles Johnston Badger – Superintendent of the United States Naval Academy
- Rear Admiral John R. Bartlett – Oceanographer
- Rear Admiral George Belknap
- Rear Admiral Charles Edgar Clark – Captain of the battleship USS Oregon during the Spanish–American War
- Rear Admiral Walter S. Crosley – Navy Cross recipient
- Rear Admiral Lewis A. Kimberly
- Rear Admiral Winfield Scott Schley – Hero of the Battle of Santiago de Cuba
- Rear Admiral Yates Stirling – Veteran of the American Civil War and the Spanish–American War
- Rear Admiral John L. Worden – Commander of the USS Monitor
- Brigadier General James Devereux, USMC – Recipient of the Navy Cross and congressman
- Brigadier General Charles Wheaton Abbot Jr., RING – Adjutant General of Rhode Island
- Brigadier General George Andrews – Adjutant General of the United States Army
- Brigadier General George Lippitt Andrews
- Brigadier General William H. Bisbee – Veteran of the Civil War and Spanish–American War (lived to age 102)
- Brigadier General Charles A. Coolidge – Veteran of the Civil War and Spanish–American War.
- Brigadier General Charles Duke, USAF – Apollo 16 lunar module pilot.
- Brigadier General Elisha Dyer Jr., RIM – Adjutant General of Rhode Island
- Brigadier General Winfield Scott Edgerly – Veteran of the Indian Wars and the Spanish–American War.
- Brigadier General James Roosevelt, USMCR – Recipient of the Navy Cross and the Silver Star.
- Brigadier General George Miller Sternberg – U.S. Army Surgeon General.
- Brigadier General Charles Foster Tillinghast Sr., RING – Veteran of the Spanish–American War and World War I
- Brevet Brigadier General Edwin S. Greeley, USV – Union Veteran of the Civil War
- Commodore Alfred Brooks Fry, NYNM - Civil engineer and commander of the New York Naval Militia.
- Captain Charles V. Gridley, USN – Captain of the USS Olympia at the Battle of Manila Bay.
- Colonel William Hayward – Commander of the Harlem Hellfighters during World War I.
- Colonel Ashley Chadbourne McKinley, USAF – Photographer on first flight over the South Pole.
- Colonel Theodore Roosevelt, USV – Spanish–American War veteran and leader of the Rough Riders.
- Colonel Joseph W. Vance, USV - Adjutant General of Illinois.
- Lieutenant Colonel John Q. Cannon, USV – Spanish-American War veteran and former Mormon leader.
- Lieutenant Colonel Russell Benjamin Harrison, USV – Veteran of the Spanish–American War and son of President Benjamin Harrison.
- Lieutenant Colonel Archibald Roosevelt, AUS – Veteran of both world wars and four time recipient of the Silver Star.
- Commander Franklin Roosevelt Jr., USN – Recipient of the Silver Star and Congressman.
- Major Washington Irving Lincoln Adams, NA – Politician, banker and veteran of World War I, descendant of President John Adams and president general of the SAR from 1922 to 1923.
- Major Archibald Butt, USA – Presidential aide who died on the RMS Titanic.
- Major Kermit Roosevelt, AUS – Served in the British and American armies in both world wars and recipient of the Military Cross.
- Brevet Major Augustus P. Davis, USV – Founder of the Sons of Union Veterans of the Civil War.

== Public officials ==
=== Cabinet officers ===
- Charles F. Adams III – Secretary of the Navy
- Russell A. Alger – United States Secretary of War
- Joseph W. Barr – Secretary of the Treasury
- Thomas F. Bayard – Secretary of State
- Herbert Hoover – Secretary of Commerce
- Charles Evans Hughes – Supreme Court Chief Justice, Secretary of State and Governor of New York
- Frank B. Kellogg – Secretary of State
- Jim Mattis - General and United States Secretary of Defense
- Franklin Roosevelt – Assistant Secretary of the Navy
- Theodore Roosevelt – Assistant Secretary of the Navy
- Elihu Root – Secretary of War and Secretary of State
- Donald Rumsfeld – Secretary of Defense
- John Sherman – Secretary of State, Secretary of the Treasury and United States Senator, author of the Sherman Anti-Trust Act
- Henry L. Stimson – Secretary of War during World War II

=== Diplomats ===
- Angier Biddle Duke – Ambassador to Denmark
- David Jayne Hill – Ambassador to Germany
- John Langeloth Loeb Jr. – Ambassador to Denmark
- Thomas W. Palmer – Ambassador to Spain
- Horace Porter – Ambassador to France
- G. Mennen Williams – Ambassador to the Philippines
- Henry L. Wilson – Diplomat and Ambassador to Mexico 1909–1913

=== Governors ===
- Sherman Adams – Governor of New Hampshire and chief of staff to President Eisenhower
- Russell A. Alger – Governor of Michigan
- Augustus O. Bourn – Governor of Rhode Island
- Simon B. Buckner – Governor of Kentucky
- Morgan Bulkeley – Governor of Connecticut, United States Senator, Mayor of Hartford and longtime president of Aetna Insurance
- Harry F. Byrd – Governor and United States senator from Virginia
- Elias Carr – Governor of North Carolina
- Lawton Chiles – U.S. Senator and Governor of Florida
- Owen Vincent Coffin – Governor of Connecticut
- Roy Cooper – Governor of North Carolina
- Channing H. Cox – Governor of Massachusetts
- Colgate Darden - Governor of Virginia
- Cushman Kellogg Davis – Governor of Minnesota
- Westmoreland Davis - Governor of Virginia
- Thomas E. Dewey – Governor of New York and presidential candidate
- Elisha Dyer Jr. – Governor of Rhode Island
- James Philip Eagle – Governor of Arkansas
- Charles Edison – Governor of New Jersey and son of Thomas Edison
- Bob Ehrlich – Governor of Maryland
- Phillips Lee Goldsborough – Governor of Maryland
- Robert S. Green – Governor of New Jersey
- Curtis Guild Jr. – Governor of Massachusetts
- Eric Holcomb – Governor of Indiana
- Lucius F. Hubbard – Governor of Minnesota and brigadier general during the Spanish–American War
- Robert Floyd Kennon – Governor of Louisiana
- Charles D. Kimball – Governor of Rhode Island
- Charles W. Lippitt – Governor of Rhode Island
- Arch A. Moore Jr. – Governor of West Virginia
- Wes Moore - Governor of Maryland
- Levi P. Morton – Vice President of the U.S. and Governor of New York
- Franklin Murphy – Governor of New Jersey
- Martin O'Malley – Governor of Maryland and presidential candidate
- Chase Osborn – Governor of Michigan
- Rick Perry – Governor of Texas
- John Garland Pollard - Governor of Virginia
- Chuck Robb - Governor of Virginia
- Henry Roberts – Governor of Connecticut
- Nelson A. Rockefeller – Governor of New York and Vice President of the United States
- Winthrop Rockefeller – Governor of Arkansas
- Theodore Roosevelt – Governor of New York
- John G. Rowland – Governor of Connecticut
- Leverett Saltonstall – Governor of Massachusetts
- Josh Stein – Governor of North Carolina
- Royal C. Taft – Governor of Rhode Island
- E. Lee Trinkle - Governor of Virginia
- William M. Tuck - Governor of Virginia
- Edwin Warfield – Governor of Maryland
- G. Mennen Williams – Governor of Michigan
- Charles S. Whitman – Governor of New York
- Rollin S. Woodruff – Governor of Connecticut

=== United States senators ===
- Lamar Alexander – United States senator from Tennessee
- Russell A. Alger – United States senator from Michigan
- Thomas F. Bayard Jr. - United States senator from Delaware
- Scott Brown – United States senator from Massachusetts
- Quentin N. Burdick – United States senator from North Dakota
- Harry F. Byrd - United States senator from Virginia
- Harry F. Byrd Jr. – United States senator from Virginia
- Royal S. Copeland – United States senator from New York
- John W. Daniel - United States senator from Virginia
- Cushman Kellogg Davis - United States senator from Minnesota
- Chauncey M. Depew – United States senator, member of the Skull and Bones Society and President of the Empire State Society SAR from 1890 to 1899
- Sam Ervin – United States senator and Distinguished Service Cross recipient
- William P. Frye – United States senator from Maine
- Carter Glass - United States senator from Virginia, President pro tempore of the United States Senate
- Barry M. Goldwater – United States senator from Arizona and presidential candidate
- Chuck Grassley - United States senator from Iowa and President pro tempore of the United States Senate
- Marcus A. Hanna – United States senator from New York
- Hamilton Fish Kean – United States senator from New Jersey
- Kenneth B. Keating – United States senator from New York and Ambassador to India and Israel
- Henry F. Lippitt – United States senator from Rhode Island
- Henry Cabot Lodge – United States senator from Massachusetts
- Richard Lugar – United States senator from Indiana
- John S. McCain, III – United States senator from Arizona
- Mitch McConnell – United States senator from Kentucky and United States Senate Minority Leader
- Jesse H. Metcalf – United States senator from Rhode Island
- John Holmes Overton – United States senator from Louisiana
- Thomas W. Palmer – United States senator from Michigan
- Gary Peters – United States senator from Michigan
- Orville H. Platt – United States senator from Connecticut
- A. Willis Robertson - United States senator from Virginia
- Chuck Robb - United States senator from Virginia
- Leverett Saltonstall – United States senator and governor of Massachusetts
- Rick Scott — United States senator and former governor of Florida
- Robert Taft Jr. – United States senator from Ohio
- Herman Talmadge – United States senator from Georgia
- Strom Thurmond – United States senator from South Carolina
- John Tower – United States senator from Texas
- Roger Wicker – United States senator from Mississippi

=== U.S. representatives ===
- Richard S. Aldrich – U.S. representative from Rhode Island
- Hale Boggs – Majority Leader, U.S. House of Representatives
- Colonel William Campbell Preston Breckinridge, CSA – U.S. representative from Kentucky
- Charles E. Chamberlain – U.S. representative from Michigan
- Byron M. Cutcheon – U.S. representative from Michigan
- Brigadier General James P. S. Devereux, USMC – U.S. representative and Navy Cross recipient
- Charles H. Grosvenor – U.S. representative
- Gilbert Gude – U.S. representative
- W. H. F. Lee - U.S. representative from Virginia, and was a Virginia SAR founding member and one of its first Vice Presidents
- Jefferson M. Levy – U.S. representative from New York and owner of Monticello
- John J. Rhodes – U.S. representative for 30 years
- John H. Rutherford - U.S. representative from Florida
- Franklin Delano Roosevelt Jr. – U.S. representative
- Henry Stockbridge – U.S. representative
- David Jenkins Ward – U.S. representative
- Bob Wilson – U.S. representative from California

=== Judges ===
- David Josiah Brewer – Associate justice of the Supreme Court
- George E. Bushnell – Chief Justice of the Michigan Supreme Court
- Pell Cooper – North Carolina District Court judge
- Alexander B. Hagner - Associate justice of the Supreme Court
- Wallace McCamant – Federal judge
- Alan Eugene Norris – Federal judge
- Seth Shepard - Chief Justice Court of Appeals for the District of Columbia
- Abram Penn Staples - Justice of the Supreme Court of Virginia
- William Howard Taft – Chief Justice of the United States

=== Foreign royalty and nobility ===
- King Juan Carlos I – King of Spain
- King Felipe VI – King of Spain
- Francisco de Borbón von Hardenberg – relative of the Spanish royal family
- Francisco de Borbón y Escasany, 5th Duke of Seville – relative of the Spanish royal family
- Sir Winston Churchill – Prime Minister of the United Kingdom
- Hélie de Noailles, 10th Duke of Noailles – French diplomat
- Étienne, Marquis de Certaines – French aristocrat
- Jacques, Comte de Trentinian – French aristocrat
- Count Thierry de Seguins-Cohorn – French aristocrat
- Duke Alexander zu Mecklenburg – German aristocrat
- Duke Borwin zu Mecklenburg – German aristocrat
- George Herbert, 8th Earl of Carnarvon

Note - HRH William, Prince of Wales and Prince Harry, Duke of Sussex are eligible for membership in the SAR by right of their descent from Corporal Benajah Strong (1740–1809) of Coventry, Connecticut.

=== Other public officials ===
- R. B. Babington – Town Alderman of Gastonia, North Carolina
- Colonel Louis R. Cheney – Mayor of Hartford, Connecticut
- Schuyler Colfax III - Mayor of South Bend, Indiana
- Arthur W. Coolidge – Lieutenant Governor of Massachusetts
- George P. Cronk – Los Angeles City Council member, 1945–52
- Arthur W. Dennis – Lieutenant Governor of Rhode Island
- Michael Elston – Assistant United States Attorney, Chief of Staff of the Office of the Deputy Attorney General, 118th SAR President General
- Seymour Lowman – Lieutenant Governor of New York
- Winthrop Paul Rockefeller – Lieutenant Governor of Arkansas
- Theodore Roosevelt – Police commissioner of New York City
- Ernest E. Rogers – Lieutenant Governor of Connecticut

== Other distinguished members ==
- Henry L. P. Beckwith Jr. – Genealogist and historian
- Thomas W. Bicknell – Educator and anti-segregationist
- Luther Blount – Inventor and shipyard owner
- George Madison Bodge – Author, historian, and genealogist
- John Nicholas Brown II – Philanthropist
- Charles W. Burpee – Newspaper editor
- John Q. Cannon – Former Mormon leader.
- Nick Clooney – American journalist, anchorman, and television host. He is the father of Academy Award-winning actor George Timothy Clooney
- John L. Dodd – Lawyer and 116th President General of the SAR
- Michael Douglas – Actor and producer
- Reverend Timothy Dwight V - President of Yale University
- Peter Lynn Foster – World aviation record holder, World-record athlete and aeronautical engineer.
- Edward Miner Gallaudet – Founder of the Columbia Institution for the Deaf
- Henry Louis Gates, Jr – Professor and chairman of the African American Studies Program at Harvard University and television host
- Elbridge Thomas Gerry – Social reformer and commodore of the New York Yacht Club
- Benjamin Apthorp Gould – Astronomer
- Kelsey Grammer – Actor and comedian
- Reverend Samuel Harrison Greene - Vice President of the Northern Baptist Convention
- John B. Hattendorf – Naval historian and professor at the United States Naval War College
- William Randolph Hearst – Newspaper publisher and U.S. Representative
- William Randolph Hearst Jr. – Newspaper editor
- Benjamin Newhall Johnson – Attorney and historian
- William Ingraham Koch – American billionaire businessman, sailor, collector and 1992 winner of America's Cup
- Walter S. Logan - President of the American Bar Association
- Nate Morris – American businessman and entrepreneur, founder of Rubicon Technologies
- William Osborn McDowell – Founder of the SAR
- Norman Vincent Peale – Author and minister
- H. Paul Pressler – Texas appeals court justice and leader of the Conservative Resurgence in the Southern Baptist Convention
- John D. Rockefeller – Oil refiner
- Theodore Roosevelt – Author and conservationist
- Mike Rowe – Television personality
- Adam Schnelting – Soldier and Missouri politician
- Elliott Fitch Shepard – Lawyer and newspaper owner
- Ricky Skaggs – Country and bluegrass musician
- Joseph Fielding Smith, Jr. - President of The Church of Jesus Christ of Latter-day Saints
- George Albert Smith – President of the Church of Jesus Christ of Latter-day Saints
- John Spencer-Churchill – Artist and nephew of Winston Churchill
- Lowell Thomas – Author and news reporter
- George Washington Vanderbilt II – Owner of the Biltmore estate
- Frank Elbridge Webb – Industrial engineer and presidential candidate in 1928 and 1932
- Edgar Williamson Jr. – Insurance executive
- James Woods – Actor and producer
