= James C. McConville =

Retired American general (born 1959)

James McConville
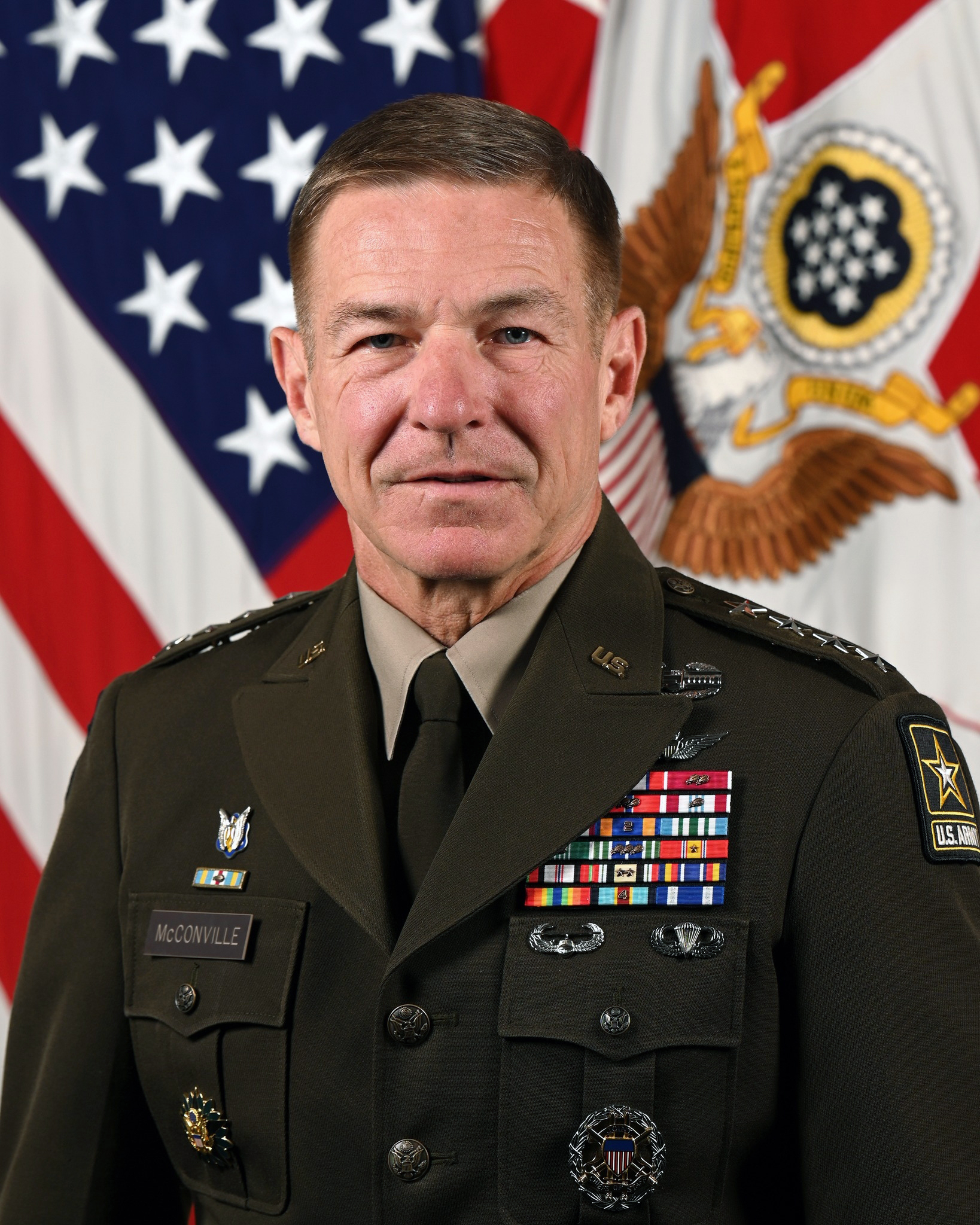
- Official portrait, 2022
- Born: James Charles McConville; 16 March 1959 (age 67); Quincy, Massachusetts, U.S.
- Education: United States Military Academy (BS); Georgia Institute of Technology (MS)
- Military career
- Allegiance: United States
- Branch: United States Army
- Service years: 1981–2023
- Rank: General
- Commands: Chief of Staff of the Army; Vice Chief of Staff of the Army; 101st Airborne Division; 4th Brigade, 1st Cavalry Division; 2nd Squadron, 17th Cavalry Regiment
- Conflicts: War in Afghanistan; Iraq War
- Awards: Army Distinguished Service Medal (2); Legion of Merit (3); Bronze Star (3)
- James C. McConville's voice McConville's opening statement at a Senate Armed Services Committee hearing on the FY2023 Army budget Recorded 5 May 2022

James Charles McConville (born 16 March 1959) is an American retired general who last served as the 40th chief of staff of the United States Army from 2019 to 2023. He was born and raised in Massachusetts, before graduating from the United States Military Academy and being commissioned as an Army officer in 1981.

He was initially in the Infantry Branch before becoming an Army aviator and serving as a helicopter pilot. McConville was deployed to Iraq and Afghanistan several times, including as the commander of the 4th Brigade, 1st Cavalry Division in Iraq, and as the commander of the 101st Airborne Division in Afghanistan. He became the longest serving commander of the 101st Airborne, from 2011 to 2014, and later served as the deputy chief of staff for personnel of the Army from 2015 to 2017. He served as the 36th vice chief of staff of the United States Army from 2017 to 2019. As the chief of staff from 2019, he continued the Army modernization program and presided over the Army's response to the COVID-19 pandemic in the United States.

== Early life and education ==
James Charles McConville was born on 16 March 1959 to Joe and Barbara McConville. His father was a United States Navy veteran of the Korean War. He was born and raised in the Merrymount neighborhood of Quincy, Massachusetts, near Boston. He graduated from Archbishop Williams High School in Braintree and then attended the United States Military Academy at West Point, New York, being commissioned as an Infantry officer in the United States Army after his graduation in 1981. McConville was nominated to the U.S. Military Academy by Senator Ted Kennedy. He earned a Bachelor of Science degree at West Point, a Master of Science degree in Aerospace Engineering from Georgia Institute of Technology in 1990, and was a 2002 National Security Fellow at Harvard University. He also attended the United States Army Command and General Staff College, graduating in 1993.

== Military career ==
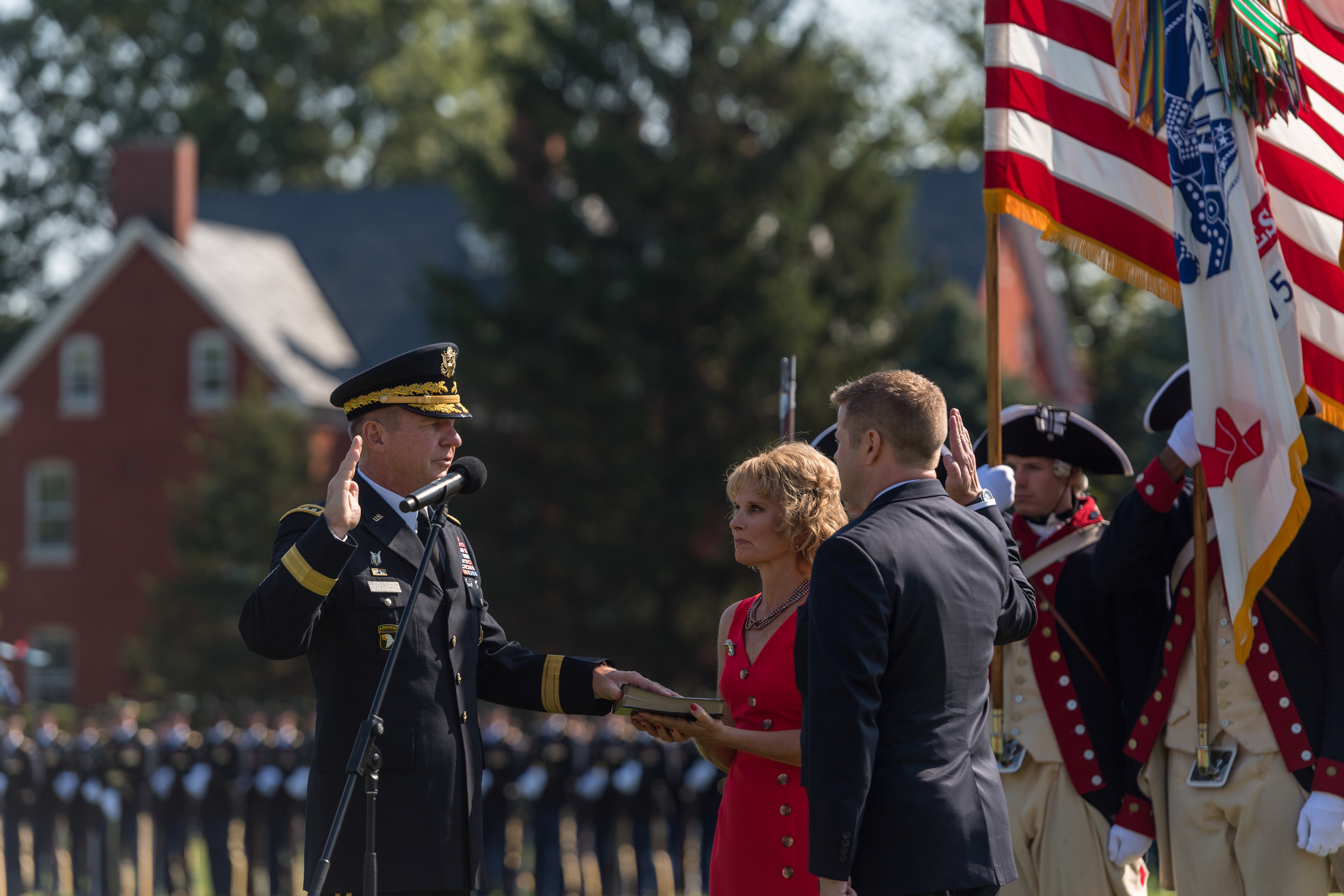
McConville is sworn in as Chief of Staff of the Army by acting Secretary of the Army Ryan D. McCarthy, 9 August 2019

McConville became a master army aviator qualified in the OH-58 Kiowa Warrior, the AH-64D Longbow Apache, the AH-6, AH-1 Cobra and other aircraft. Early in his career, McConville's assignments included 2nd Squadron, 10th Cavalry Regiment in 1982, and command of an air cavalry troop in 2nd Squadron, 9th Cavalry Regiment, 7th Infantry Division (Light) at Fort Ord, California, from 1982 to 1986. He was later the S-3 officer for the Flight Concepts Division at Fort Eustis, Virginia, in 1990, S-3 of the 5th Squadron, 9th Cavalry, from 1994 to 1995, then S-3 of the 25th Combat Aviation Brigade, 25th Infantry Division, from 1995 to 1996. McConville was a J5 strategic planner in the U.S. Special Operations Command at MacDill Air Force Base, Florida, from 1996 to 1998, followed by command of 2nd Squadron, 17th Cavalry Regiment in 101st Airborne Division at Fort Campbell, Kentucky, from 1998 to 2000. He was the division's G-3 officer from 2000 to 2001.

Starting from 2002 McConville commanded the 1st Cavalry Division's 4th Brigade at Fort Hood, Texas, a unit with 64 helicopters, including during its deployment in the Iraq War from 2004 to 2005. His air cavalry brigade took part in hundreds of combat missions in Iraq and was selected as the 2004 AAAA Aviation Unit of the Year. McConville was Executive Officer to the Vice Chief of Staff of the Army from 2005 to 2007, then Deputy Commanding General (Support) for 101st Airborne Division, as well as for Combined Joint Task Force 101 and Regional Command East in Afghanistan during Operation Enduring Freedom from 2008 to 2009. Much of his time in Afghanistan was spent focusing on development programs. Starting from 2009, he was Deputy Chief and Chief of the Office of Legislative Liaison.

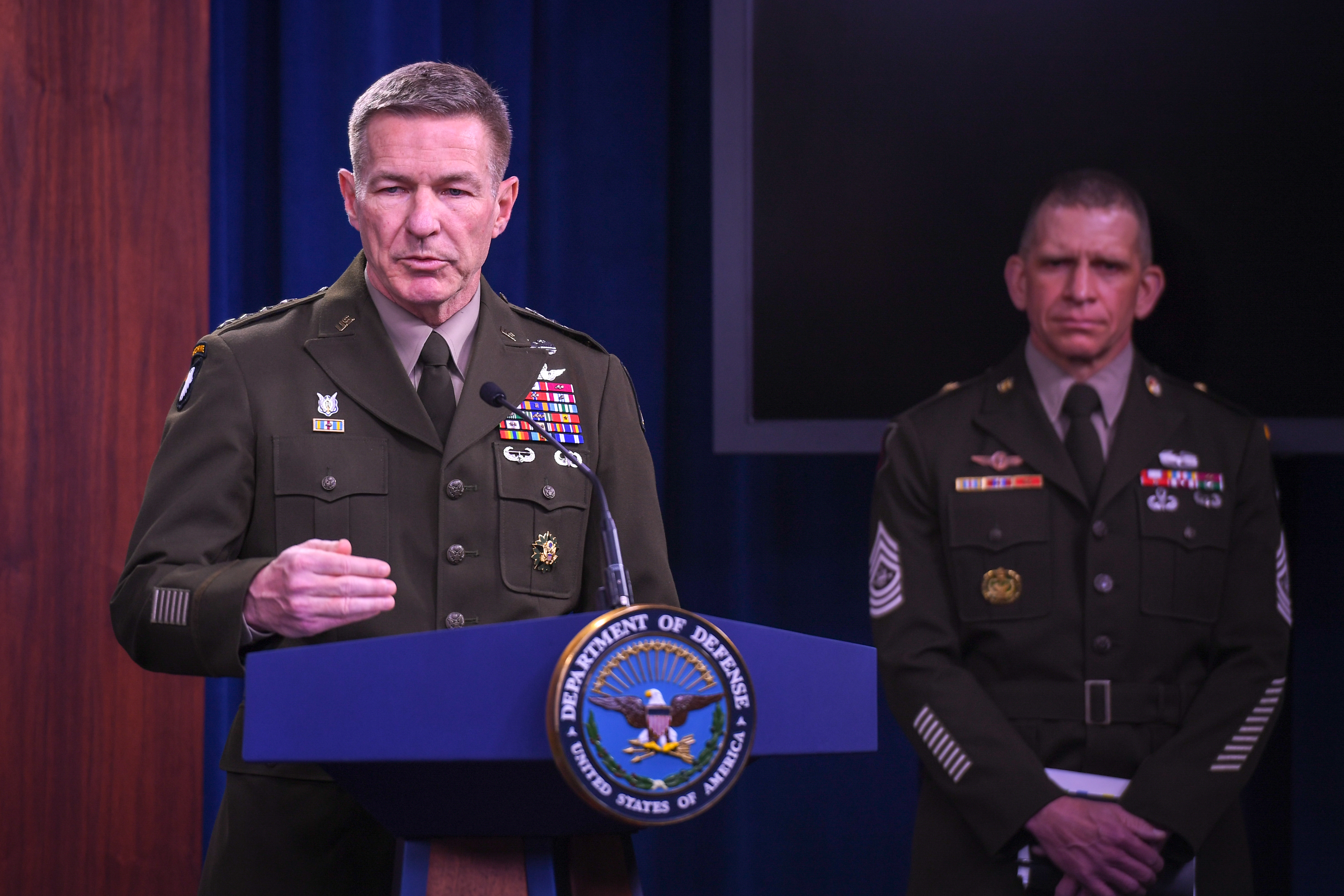
McConville speaks at a press conference about COVID-19, in March 2020.

He became the commanding general of the 101st Airborne Division on 12 August 2011. During his tenure, the division was deployed to Afghanistan, where he also led Combined Joint Task Force 101 in Regional Command East. McConville commanded the 101st Airborne Division until 20 June 2014, becoming its longest serving commander, and the longest serving division commander in Army history. His next assignment was as Deputy Chief of Staff for Personnel (G-1) of the U.S. Army in Washington, D.C.

He was nominated for appointment as vice chief of staff on 24 April 2017, for chief of staff Mark Milley. On 25 March 2019, McConville was nominated for appointment as chief of staff of the Army. He took office on 9 August 2019, succeeding Milley, and becoming the first aviator to be the head of the Army. In that role, he continued the Army modernization program that he had worked on with Milley when he was the vice chief, and presided over the Army's response to the COVID-19 pandemic. McConville visited Europe in July 2022, where he met with representatives from the armies of 30 European countries and discussed NATO's response to the Russian invasion of Ukraine. He relinquished office as chief of staff on 4 August 2023.

== Awards and decorations ==
Combat Action Badge
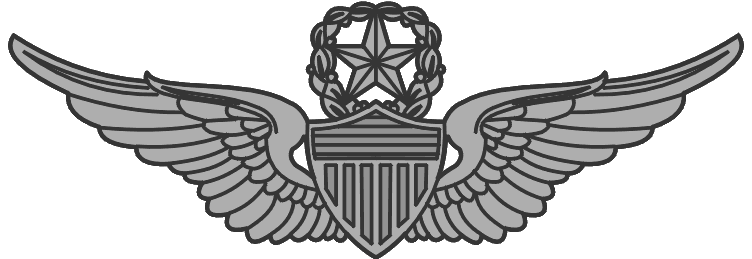
Master Army Aviator Badge
Air Assault Badge
Basic Parachutist Badge
Office of the Joint Chiefs of Staff Identification Badge
Army Staff Identification Badge
101st Airborne Division Combat Service Identification Badge
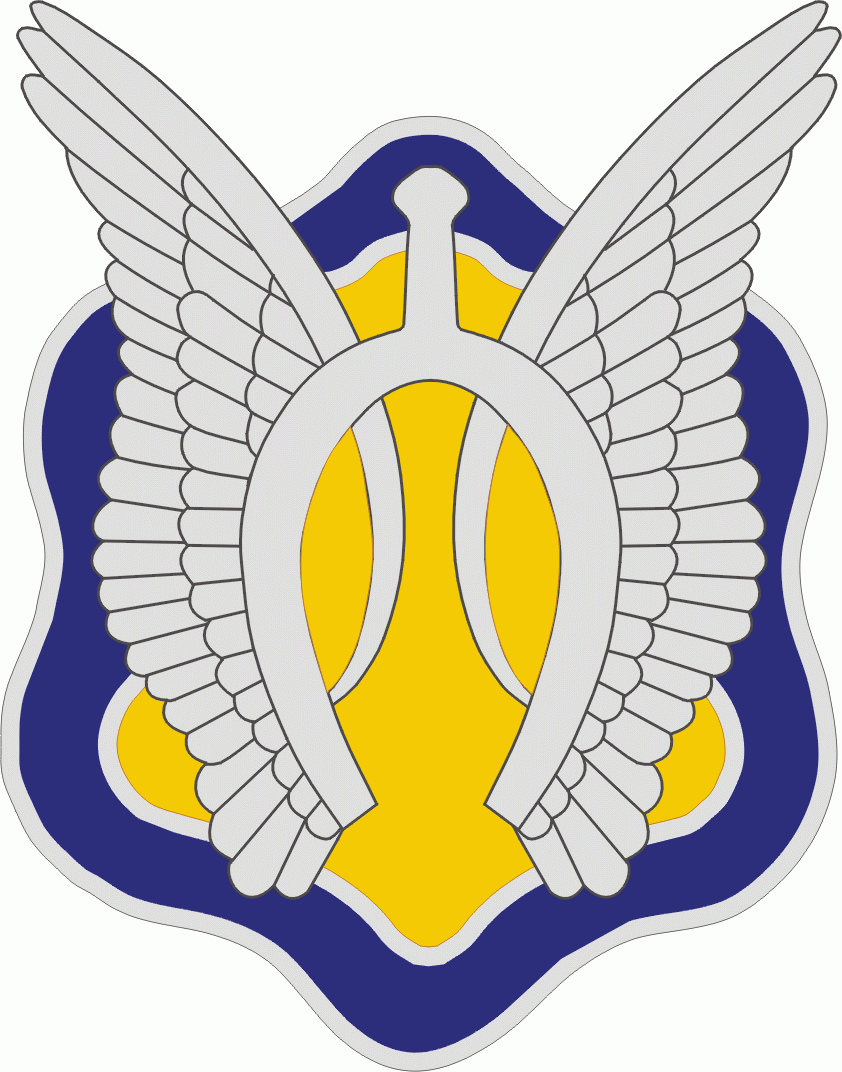
17th Cavalry Regiment Distinctive Unit Insignia
6 Overseas Service Bars

Army Distinguished Service Medal with one bronze oak leaf cluster
Legion of Merit with two oak leaf clusters
Bronze Star Medal with two oak leaf clusters
Defense Meritorious Service Medal with oak leaf cluster
Meritorious Service Medal with two oak leaf clusters
Air Medal with bronze award numeral 2
Joint Service Commendation Medal
Army Commendation Medal with oak leaf cluster
Army Achievement Medal with three oak leaf clusters
Joint Meritorious Unit Award with oak leaf cluster
National Defense Service Medal with service star
Afghanistan Campaign Medal with two campaign stars
Iraq Campaign Medal with two campaign stars
Global War on Terrorism Service Medal
Army Service Ribbon
Army Overseas Service Ribbon with award numeral 4
NATO Medal for service with ISAF
Kartika Eka Paksi Utama (Army Meritorious Service Star), First Class (Indonesia)

== Personal life ==
McConville and his wife, Maria, have three children serving in the military.

Military offices
Preceded by John F. Campbell	Commander of the 101st Airborne Division; 2011–2014	Succeeded by Gary J. Volesky
Preceded by Howard B. Bromberg	Deputy Chief of Staff for Personnel of the United States Army; 2015–2017	Succeeded by Thomas C. Seamands
Preceded by Daniel B. Allyn	Vice Chief of Staff of the United States Army; 2017–2019	Succeeded by Joseph M. Martin
Preceded by Mark Milley	Chief of Staff of the United States Army; 2019–2023	Succeeded by Randy George
