= Deputy Chief of Staff G-1 Personnel of The United States Army =

Part of the Department of the Army Headquarters

Deputy Chief of Staff G-1 Personnel of the United States Army
- Country: United States
- Branch: Army
- Garrison/HQ: The Pentagon, Washington, D.C.

Commanders
- DCS G-1: LTG Brian S. Eifler

The Office of the Deputy Chief of Staff for Personnel, Department of the Army, United States Army, also known as the G-1, is responsible for development, management and execution of all manpower and personnel plans, programs and policies throughout the entire U.S. Army. As the principal human relations of the U.S., Army, it is dedicated to supporting and empowering soldiers, civilian employees, military families and veterans worldwide in peace or war. As such the office oversees recruiting, retention and sustainment of a high quality volunteer force through innovative and effective training programs. The primary objective of the office is to ensure readiness of its personnel to serve the needs of the Army as a whole across the full spectrum of its operations.

== Organization ==
The Office includes in its organization:

- Public Affairs Office
- Management Support Office
- Army G-1 Chief Information Office
- Assistant G-1 for Civilian Personnel
- Military Personnel Management Directorate
  - Enlisted Division
    - Professional Development Branch
    - Distribution and Readiness Branch
    - Analytical Cell
    - Training Requirements Division
    - Enlisted Accessions Division
  - Officer Division
  - Operations Division
- Human Systems Integration Directorate (MANPRINT)
- U.S. Army Research Institute for the Behavioral and Social Sciences (ARI)
- Army Resiliency Directorate
- Human Resources Command
- Plans and Resources Directorate
  - Military Strength Analysis and Forecasting Division
  - Resources Division
    - Resource Development Branch
    - Program Analysis Branch
  - Compensation and Entitlements Division
    - Military Pay Branch
    - Travel and Transportation Branch
  - Plans Division
    - Operations and Analysis Branch
    - Combat Support/Services Support Branch and Combat Arms Branch
    - Concepts Integration Branch
  - Manpower Allocation Division
  - Manpower Policy, Plans, and Programs Division

== List of Deputy Chiefs of Staff for Personnel ==
No.	Deputy Chief of Staff		Term		
No.	Portrait	Name	Took office	Left office	Term length
Assistant Chief of Staff for Personnel (1950–1956)
20	Donald P. Booth	Major General; Donald P. Booth (1902–1993)	1955	1956	~1 year, 0 days
Deputy Chief of Staff for Personnel (1956–present)
21	Walter L. Weible	Lieutenant General; Walter L. Weible (1896–1980)	1956	1957	~1 year, 0 days
22	Donald P. Booth	Lieutenant General; Donald P. Booth (1902–1993)	1957	1958	~1 year, 0 days
23	James F. Collins	Lieutenant General; James F. Collins (1905–1989)	1958	1961	~3 years, 0 days
24	Russell L. Vittrup	Lieutenant General; Russell L. Vittrup (1906–1992)	1961	1963	~2 years, 0 days
25	James L. Richardson	Lieutenant General; James L. Richardson (1909–1987)	1963	1965	~2 years, 0 days
26	James K. Woolnough	Lieutenant General; James K. Woolnough (1910–1996)	1965	1967	~2 years, 0 days
27	Albert O. Connor	Lieutenant General; Albert O. Connor (1914–1989)	1967	1969	~2 years, 0 days
28	Walter T. Kerwin Jr.	Lieutenant General; Walter T. Kerwin Jr. (1917–2008)	1969	1972	~3 years, 0 days
29	Bernard W. Rogers	Lieutenant General; Bernard W. Rogers (1921–2008)	1972	1974	~2 years, 0 days
30	Harold G. Moore Jr.	Lieutenant General; Harold G. Moore Jr. (1922–2017)	1974	1977	~3 years, 0 days
31	DeWitt C. Smith Jr.	Lieutenant General; DeWitt C. Smith Jr. (1920–2005)	1977	1978	~1 year, 0 days
32	Robert G. Yerks	Lieutenant General; Robert G. Yerks (1928–2021)	1978	1981	~3 years, 0 days
33	Maxwell R. Thurman	Lieutenant General; Maxwell R. Thurman (1931–1995)	1981	1983	~2 years, 0 days
34	Robert M. Elton	Lieutenant General; Robert M. Elton (born 1932)	1983	1987	~4 years, 0 days
35	Allen K. Ono	Lieutenant General; Allen K. Ono (1933–2016)	1987	1990	~3 years, 0 days
36	William H. Reno	Lieutenant General; William H. Reno (born 1936)	1990	1992	~2 years, 0 days
37	Thomas P. Carney	Lieutenant General; Thomas P. Carney (1940–2019)	1992	1994	~2 years, 0 days
38	Theodore G. Stroup	Lieutenant General; Theodore G. Stroup (born 1940)	1994	1996	~2 years, 0 days
39	Frederick E. Vollrath	Lieutenant General; Frederick E. Vollrath (1940–2017)	1996	1998	~2 years, 0 days
40	David H. Ohle	Lieutenant General; David H. Ohle (born 1944)	21 September 1998	August 2000	~1 year, 315 days
41	Timothy J. Maude	Lieutenant General; Timothy J. Maude (1947–2001)	August 2000	11 September 2001 †	~1 year, 41 days
42	John M. LeMoyne	Lieutenant General; John M. LeMoyne (born 1943)	October 2001	October 2003	~2 years, 0 days
43	Franklin L. Hagenbeck	Lieutenant General; Franklin L. Hagenbeck (born 1949)	~October 2003	June 2006	~2 years, 243 days
44	Michael Rochelle	Lieutenant General; Michael Rochelle (born 1950)	June 2006	August 2009	~3 years, 61 days
-	Gina S. Farrisee	Major General; Gina S. Farrisee; Acting	August 2009	February 2010	~184 days
45	Thomas P. Bostick	Lieutenant General; Thomas P. Bostick (born 1956)	2 February 2010	22 May 2012	2 years, 110 days
46	Howard B. Bromberg	Lieutenant General; Howard B. Bromberg	21 July 2012	4 August 2014	2 years, 14 days
47	James C. McConville	Lieutenant General; James C. McConville (born 1959)	4 August 2014	26 May 2017	2 years, 295 days
48	Thomas C. Seamands	Lieutenant General; Thomas C. Seamands (born 1959)	26 May 2017	3 August 2020	3 years, 69 days
49	Gary M. Brito	Lieutenant General; Gary M. Brito (born 1963/1964)	3 August 2020	5 August 2022	2 years, 2 days
50	Douglas F. Stitt	Lieutenant General; Douglas F. Stitt	5 August 2022	12 July 2024	1 year, 342 days
-	Roy A. Wallace	Roy A. Wallace; Acting	12 July 2024	2 August 2024	21 days
51	Brian S. Eifler	Lieutenant General; Brian S. Eifler	2 August 2024	Incumbent	2 years, 95 days
