= General Reno =

General Reno may refer to:

- Jesse L. Reno (1823–1862), Union Army major general
- Marcus Reno (1834–1889), Union Army brevet brigadier general
- William H. Reno (born 1936), U.S. Army lieutenant general
