= Brian S. Eifler =

American Army lieutenant general

Lieutenant General Brian S. Eifler
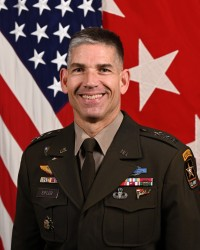
- Born: 30 June 1968 (age 58); Farmington Hills, Michigan, U.S.
- Education: Central Michigan University (BA); U.S. Army War College (MSS)
- Military career
- Allegiance: United States
- Branch: United States Army
- Service years: 1990–present
- Rank: Lieutenant General
- Commands: 11th Airborne Division; United States Army Alaska; 3rd Brigade, 25th Infantry Division; Special Troops Battalion, 75th Ranger Regiment; 1st Battalion, 6th Infantry Regiment
- Conflicts: Operation Uphold Democracy; Operation Iraqi Freedom; War in Afghanistan; Operation Inherent Resolve
- Awards: Army Distinguished Service Medal; Defense Superior Service Medal; Legion of Merit (4); Bronze Star Medal (3)

Brian Spencer Eifler (born 30 June 1968) is a United States Army lieutenant general who has served as the deputy chief of staff for personnel of the United States Army (G-1) since August 2024. He served as the first commanding general of the recently reactivated 11th Airborne Division and the Deputy Commander of Alaskan Command from 2021 to 2024. On 6 June 2022, USARAK reflagged to 11th Airborne Division as part of the implementation of the Army's arctic strategy. He has also served as the Deputy Commander for Operations of the 10th Mountain Division and Operation Inherent Resolve from July 2017 to November 2018.

== Military career ==
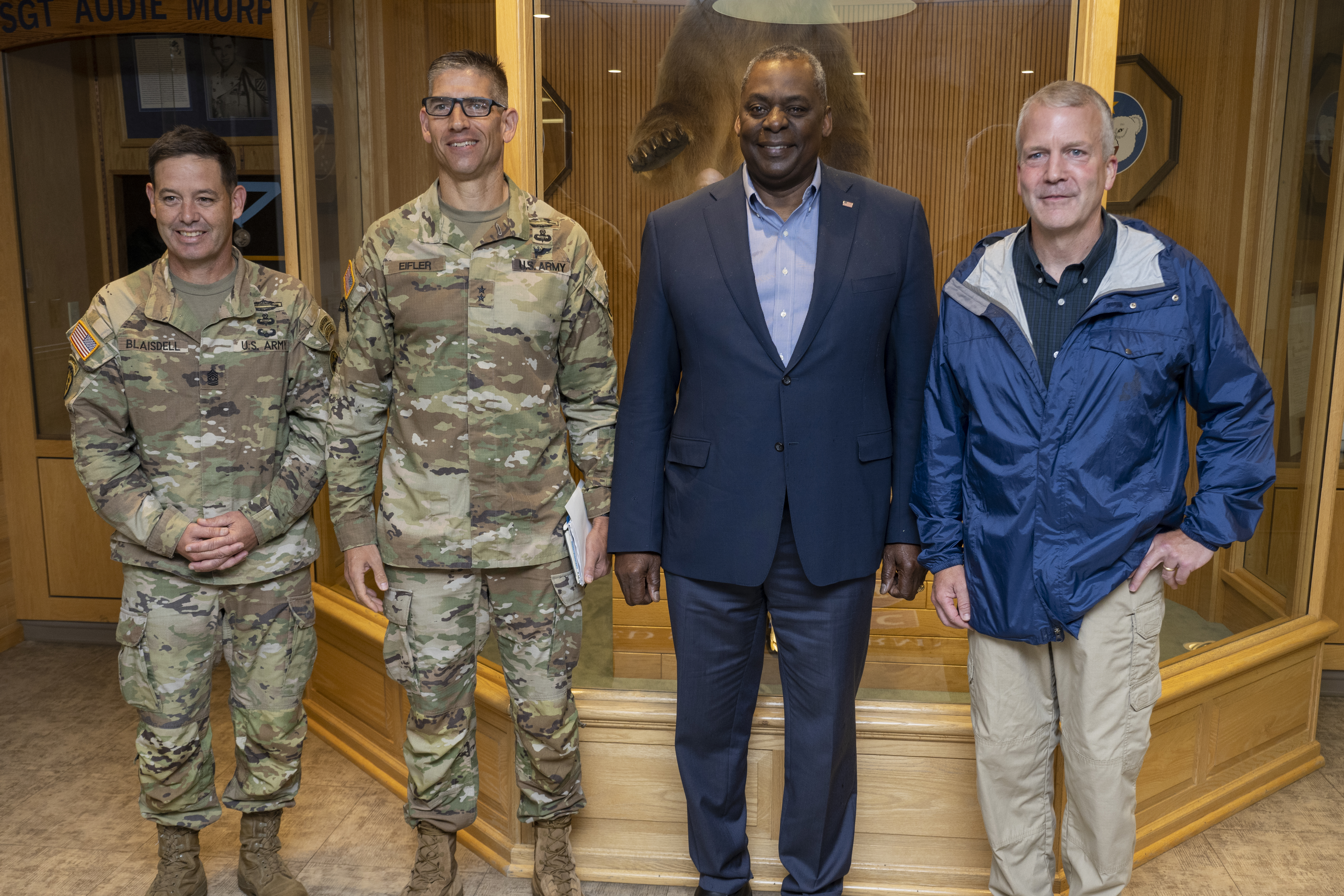
Eifler (middle left) with Secretary of Defense Lloyd Austin (middle right)

In 1990, Eifler graduated from Central Michigan University with a bachelor's degree in Interpersonal and Public Communication, gaining a commission as an infantry officer via the Reserve Officers' Training Corps program. As part of his professional military education, he went on to graduate from the United States Army Command and General Staff College and received a master of strategic studies degree from the United States Army War College in 2012.

As the commanding general of 11th Airborne Division and the Deputy Commander of Alaskan Command, Eifler plays a vital role in the implementation of the United States Arctic Strategy.

In May 2024, Eifler was nominated for promotion to lieutenant general and assignment as deputy chief of staff for personnel of the United States Army.

=== Promotions ===
Rank	Date Confirmed by US Senate
Lieutenant General	31 July 2024
Major General	25 February 2021
Brigadier General	31 October 2017
Colonel	3 December 2009
Lieutenant Colonel	30 September 2005
Major	6 October 2000

=== Recent Assignments ===
Eifler's recent assignments include Commanding General, United States Army Alaska; Chief, Legislative Liaison, Office of the Secretary of the Army; Deputy Commanding General (Operations), 10th Mountain Division and Operation Inherent Resolve

=== Awards and decorations ===
Combat Infantryman Badge
Expert Infantryman Badge
Ranger tab
Master Parachutist Badge
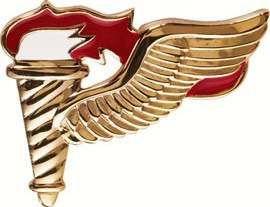
Pathfinder Badge
Army Staff Identification Badge
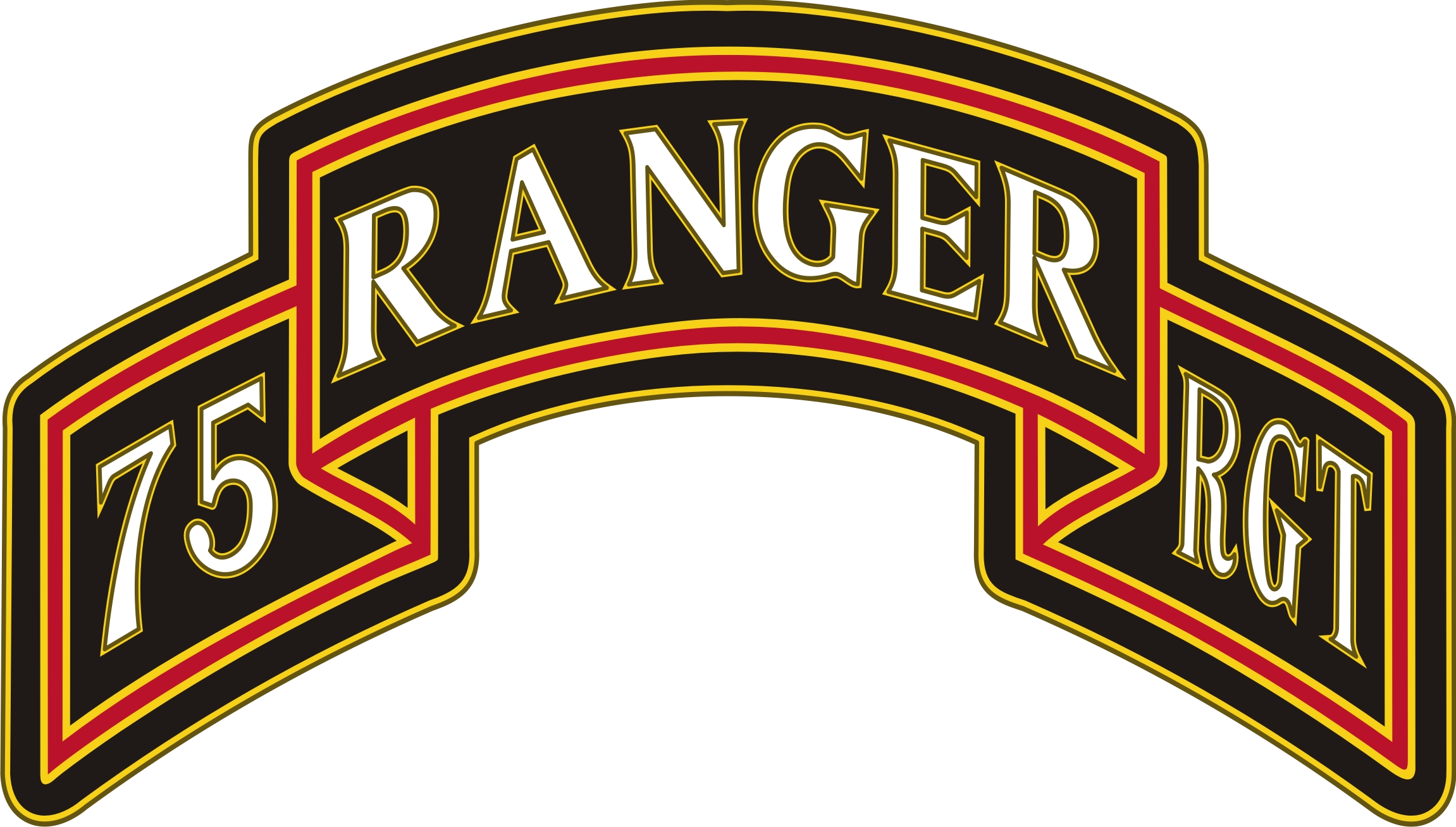
75th Ranger Regiment CSIB
Royal Thai Army Parachutist Badge
Army Distinguished Service Medal
Defense Superior Service Medal
Legion of Merit with three bronze Oak Leaf Clusters
Bronze Star Medal with two bronze Oak Leaf Clusters
Meritorious Service Medal with two bronze Oak Leaf Cluster
Army Commendation Medal with V device and three bronze Oak Leaf Clusters
Army Achievement Medal with two bronze Oak Leaf Clusters
Presidential Unit Citation
Joint Meritorious Unit Award one bronze Oak Leaf Cluster
|Valorous Unit Award one bronze Oak Leaf Cluster
Philippine Republic Presidential Unit Citation
National Defense Service Medal w/ one bronze service star
Armed Forces Expeditionary Medal
Afghanistan Campaign Medal
Iraq Campaign Medal with two bronze service stars
Inherent Resolve Campaign Medal
Global War on Terrorism Expeditionary Medal
Global War on Terrorism Service Medal
Korea Defense Service Medal
Humanitarian Service Medal
Military Outstanding Volunteer Service Medal
Army Service Ribbon
Overseas Service Ribbon with a bronze award numeral 5

Military offices
Preceded by Xavier Brunson	Deputy Commanding General (Operations) of the 10th Mountain Division; 2017–2018	Succeeded by ???
Preceded by Brian E. Winski	Chief Legislative Liaison of the United States Army; 2018–2021	Succeeded by Trevor J. Bredenkamp
Preceded by Joseph R. Calloway	Commanding General of the 11th Airborne Division and Deputy Commander of the United States Alaskan Command; 2021–2024	Succeeded by Joseph E. Hilbert
Preceded by Douglas Stitt	Deputy Chief of Staff for Personnel of the United States Army; 2024–present	Incumbent
