= DeWitt C. Smith Jr. =

American Army general

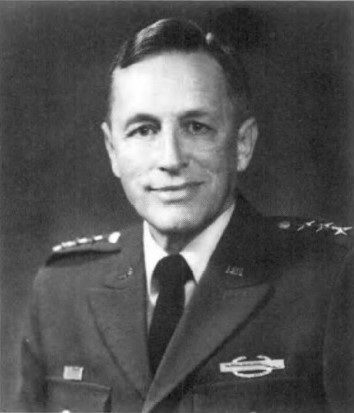
- Born: 31 August 1920; Baltimore, Maryland
- Died: 21 July 2005 (aged 84); New London, Connecticut
- Military career
- Allegiance: United States
- Branch: United States Army
- Service years: 1942–1980
- Rank: Lieutenant General
- Commands: U.S. Army War College
- Conflicts: World War II; Korean War; Vietnam War
- Awards: Distinguished Service Medal (2); Silver Star Medal; Legion of Merit (4); Bronze Star Medal (2); Purple Heart (3)

DeWitt Clinton Smith Jr. (31 August 1920 – 21 July 2005) was a United States Army lieutenant general who served as the Deputy Chief of Staff for Personnel from 1977 to 1978. He was also the longest serving commandant of the U.S. Army War College, serving from 1974 to 1977 and again from 1978 to 1980.

== Early life and education ==
Born in Baltimore and raised in Bethesda, Maryland, Smith graduated from Bethesda-Chevy Chase High School. He then attended Oberlin College but dropped out to join the fight against fascism in Europe at the outset of World War II. After the war, Smith completed a bachelor's degree in government and politics at the University of Maryland. He later graduated from the Army Command and General Staff College in 1956, the Armed Forces Staff College in 1962 and the Army War College.

== Military career ==
After leaving college, Smith enlisted in the Canadian Army under an assumed name. His father found out and arranged for his discharge. After the United States entered World War II, Smith enlisted in the U.S. Army on 28 October 1942. Sent to basic training, noncommissioned officers school and then officer candidate school at Fort Benning, he was commissioned as a second lieutenant of infantry on 12 July 1943. He served with the 53rd Armored Infantry Battalion, 4th Armored Division in Europe, earning a Silver Star Medal, two Bronze Star Medals and three Purple Hearts.

Released from active duty in 1946, Smith remained in the Army Reserves while completing his education. He returned to active duty during the Korean War.

Smith later commanded the 2d Brigade, 3d Armored Division in Germany and a combat brigade of the 1st Infantry Division in Vietnam.

In 1974, Smith was appointed commandant of the Army War College. Promoted to lieutenant general in 1977, he served as the Deputy Chief of Staff for Personnel until 1978 when he planned to retire from active duty. Instead he ended up switching places with Robert G. Yerks, his successor at the Army War College. Yerks took up the Deputy Chief of Staff position while Smith returned to the Army War College as commandant. He served there until 1980 when he left military service.

== Personal ==
Smith was the son of DeWitt Clinton Smith Sr. and Gladys Benson Smith.

Smith was married to Margaret Elizabeth "Betty" Bond (26 December 1923 – 31 March 2018). They had two sons, four daughters and twelve grandchildren.

After retirement, Smith and his wife settled in Niantic, Connecticut. After suffering a stroke, he died at Lawrence & Memorial Hospital in New London, Connecticut. Smith was buried at Arlington National Cemetery on 3 October 2005. His wife was interred beside him on 4 June 2018.
