= Ogdensburg Free Academy =

Location
- 1100 State Street; Ogdensburg, New York; Northern New York; Ogdensburg, Saint Lawrence County, New York 13669; United States; 44.688°N 75.484°W

Information
- School type: Public high school
- Religious affiliation: freedom of religion
- Founded: 1868
- Status: Open
- School district: Ogdensburg City School District
- Superintendent: Kevin Kendall
- Principal: Cynthia Tuttle (9–12), Stephen Putman (7–8)
- Grades: 7–12
- Age range: 11–19
- Hours in school day: 7
- Colours: Royal Blue and White
- Athletics: Football, cross-country, cheerleading, soccer, swimming, winter track, hockey, basketball, spring track, lacrosse, golf, baseball and softball
- Athletics conference: Section X
- Mascot: The Blue Devil
- Nickname: OFA
- Team name: Blue Devils
- Rivals: Salmon River, Malone, and Governour
- Yearbook: The Devilog
- Website: www.ogdensburgk12.org/

Ogdensburg Free Academy is a public high school in Ogdensburg, New York. It consists of around 750 or more students in the 7th through 12th grade. The famous Golden Dome is located on State Street and attracts residents from across the North Country. Every year, the Ogdensburg Boys & Girls Clubs of America hosts an 'Expo' where local businesses can get the most advertisement. There are also performances (such as the local dance studio or choir) in the Golden Dome.

== History ==
Ogdensburg Free Academy was founded in 1868.

In March 2020, Ogdensburg Free Academy, along with other schools in the area, closed due to the COVID-19 pandemic. It remained closed until the end of the school year, with classes being held online.

== Academics ==
Ogdensburg Free Academy is ranked 425th in New York State, and 5,125th in the nation. The AP participation rate is 23%, minority enrollment is 2%, and 54% of enrolled students are economically disadvantaged. It performs slightly below the state median.

== Athletics ==
Ogdensburg Free Academy's sports teams are known as the Blue Devils.

OFA is home to the Van Dusen track meet, one of the oldest sporting events in New York history.

Ogdensburg Free Academy offers the following sports:

=== Fall sports ===
- Cheerleading (Varsity)
- Boys’ Cross Country (Varsity, Modified)
- Girls’ Cross Country (Varsity, Modified)
- Football (Varsity, JV, Modified)
- Boys’ Soccer (Varsity, JV, Modified)
- Girls’ Soccer (Varsity, JV, Modified)
- Girls’ Swimming (Varsity, Modified)
- Volleyball (Varsity, JV, Modified)

=== Winter sports ===
- Boys’ Basketball (Varsity, JV, Modified 8th, Modified 7th)
- Girls’ Basketball (Varsity, JV, Modified 8th, Modified 7th)
- Cheerleading (Varsity)
- Boys’ Ice Hockey (Varsity)
- Girls’ Ice Hockey (Varsity, merger with Canton)
- Boys’ Indoor Track and Field (Varsity, Modified)
- Girls’ Indoor Track and Field (Varsity, Modified)
- Wrestling (Varsity, JV, Modified)
- Boys’ Bowling (Varsity)
- Girls’ Bowling (Varsity)

=== Spring sports ===
- Baseball (Varsity, JV, Modified)
- Softball (Varsity, JV, Modified)
- Boys’ Lacrosse (Varsity, Modified)
- Girls’ Lacrosse (Varsity, Modified)
- Boys’ Outdoor Track and Field (Varsity, Modified)
- Girls’ Outdoor Track and Field (Varsity, Modified)
- Golf (Varsity)

=== Intramurals ===
- Weight Training (Grades 7-12)

== Performances and Fine Arts ==
Ogdensburg Free Academy offers many opportunities to students interested in the arts.

=== Art ===
The art department offers a wide variety of classes such as Studio Art, which covers a wide range of different media, as well as more specialized classes such as sculpting, ceramics, painting, and digital art to grades 9 through 12. Students in 7th grade must also take one semester of an art class.

Every year in the fall and spring, the school hosts an art show showcasing entries from grades K-12 throughout the school district in the James F. Montpelier art gallery.

=== Music ===
The music department offers both band and chorus for grades 9-12, as well as a separate middle school band and chorus for grades 7–8. There is also a separate Jazz Band for 7-12.

=== Theater ===
The OFA Drama Club puts an annual musical on in the first weekend of December. Participation is not mandatory. Grades 8-12 are allowed to audition for speaking roles, or alternatively participate in the ensemble alongside Grade 7. In addition, Grades 7-12 are allowed to join the crew to help with the lights, audio, and any props that need to be moved on and off stage. Only Grade 12 students taking Theater Tech as an elective and specially trained personnel are allowed to man the ropes on stage.

== Alumni ==
- Douglas Stitt, U.S. Army general
- Pete Gogolak, the first soccer-style placekicker in American professional football,
- Charlie Gogolak, his younger brother who also became a professional football placekicker, played football games there.
