= Gary Brito =

United States Army general

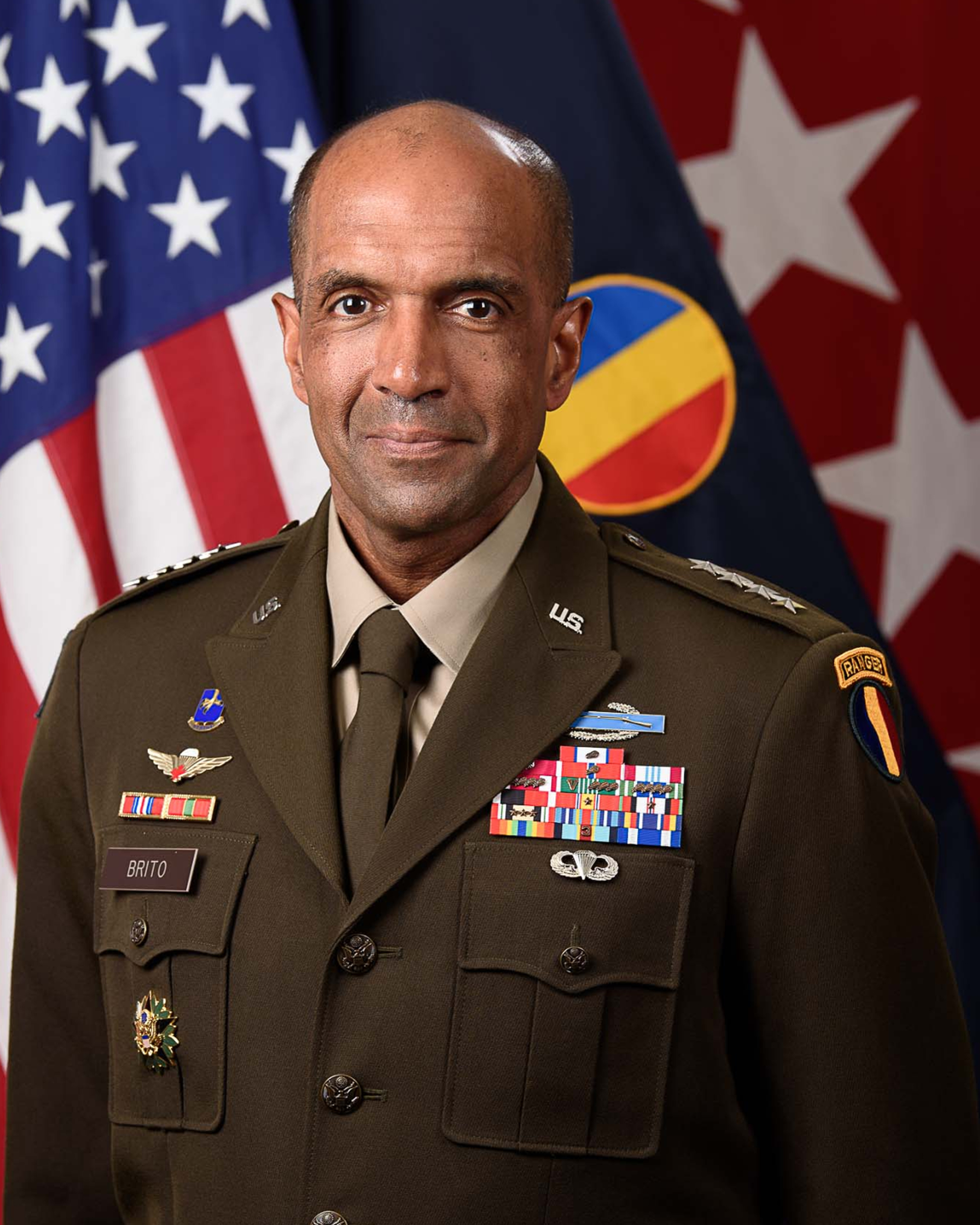
- Born: 1963 or 1964 (age 62–63); Hyannis, Massachusetts, U.S.
- Military career
- Allegiance: United States
- Branch: United States Army
- Service years: 1987–2025
- Rank: General
- Commands: United States Army Training and Doctrine Command; Fort Benning; Fort Polk; 120th Infantry Brigade; 1st Battalion, 15th Infantry Regiment
- Conflicts: War in Afghanistan; Iraq War
- Awards: Army Distinguished Service Medal (2); Legion of Merit (6); Bronze Star Medal (2)
- Gary Brito's voice Brito's opening statement at a House Armed Services subcommittee hearing on talent management and reorganization Recorded February 8, 2022

Gary M. Brito (born 1963 or 1964) is a United States Army general who served as Commanding General, United States Army Training and Doctrine Command from September 2022 to September 2025. He served as Deputy Chief of Staff, G-1 of the United States Army from July 2020 to August 2022. He was also the first African American of Cape Verdean ethnicity to command Fort Benning. Further commands included the Joint Readiness Training Center and Fort Polk; the 120th Infantry Brigade, 1st Army; and 1st Battalion, 15th Infantry Regiment.

Born and raised in Hyannis, Massachusetts, he was commissioned in 1987 from ROTC at the Pennsylvania State University.

Brito earned a Bachelor of Science degree in Community Studies from the Pennsylvania State University. He later received a master's degree in Human Resource Management from Troy State University and another master's degree in Joint Strategy and Campaign Planning from the Joint Advanced Warfighting School.

== Awards and decorations ==
Combat Infantryman Badge
Ranger tab
Basic Parachutist Badge
Army Staff Identification Badge
Canadian Parachutist badge
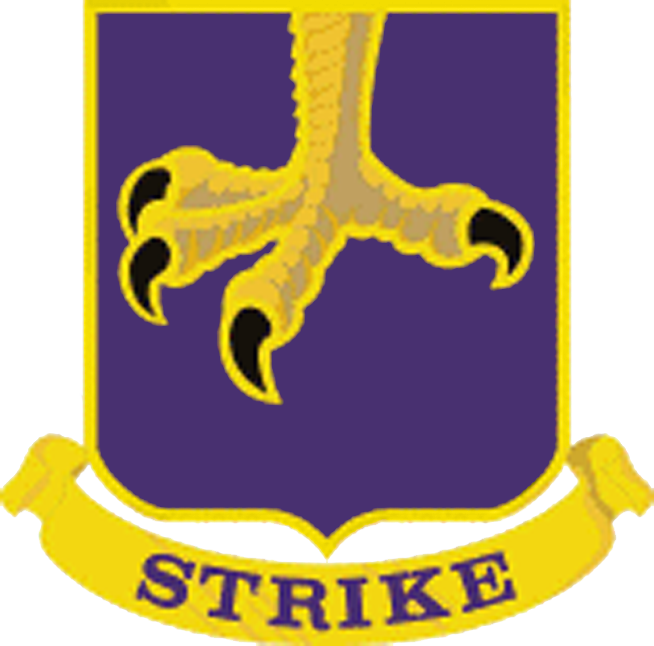
502nd Infantry Regiment Distinctive Unit Insignia
3rd Infantry Division Shoulder Sleeve Insignia
5 Overseas Service Bars

Army Distinguished Service Medal with one bronze oak leaf cluster
Legion of Merit with silver oak leaf cluster
Bronze Star Medal with oak leaf cluster
Defense Meritorious Service Medal
Meritorious Service Medal with four oak leaf clusters
Army Commendation Medal with Valor device and three oak leaf clusters
Army Achievement Medal with four oak leaf clusters
Valorous Unit Award
Superior Unit Award
Army of Occupation Medal
National Defense Service Medal with one bronze service star
Afghanistan Campaign Medal with service star
Iraq Campaign Medal with three service stars
Global War on Terrorism Expeditionary Medal
Global War on Terrorism Service Medal
Army Service Ribbon
Army Overseas Service Ribbon with bronze award numeral 3
NATO Medal for service with ISAF

Military offices
Preceded by Sean M. Jenkins	Deputy Commanding General (Support) of the 25th Infantry Division; 2015	Succeeded by Patrick Matlock
Preceded by Bryan P. Fenton	Deputy Commanding General (Operations) of the 25th Infantry Division; 2015–2016	Succeeded by Stephen L. Michael
Preceded by Timothy P. McGuire	Commanding General of the Joint Readiness Training Center; 2016–2018	Succeeded by Patrick Frank
Preceded by Eric J. Wesley	Commanding General of the United States Army Maneuver Center of Excellence; 2018–2020	Succeeded by Patrick J. Donahoe
Preceded by Thomas C. Seamands	Deputy Chief of Staff for Personnel of the United States Army; 2020–2022	Succeeded by Douglas Stitt
Preceded by Paul E. Funk II	Commanding General of United States Army Training and Doctrine Command; 2022–2025	Position Abolished
