= Thomas C. Seamands =

United States Army general

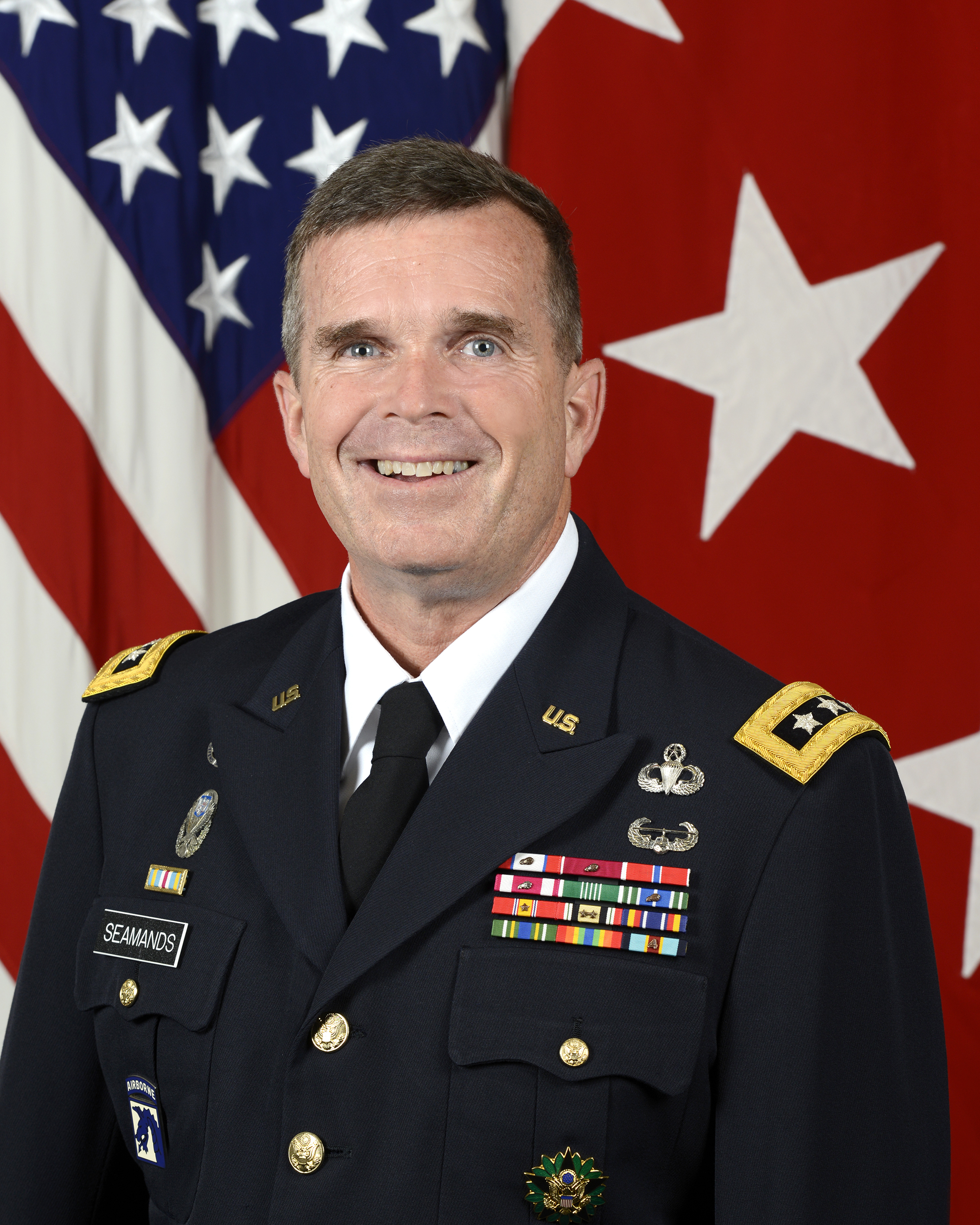
- Born: August 8, 1959 (age 67)
- Military career
- Allegiance: United States
- Branch: United States Army
- Service years: 1981–2020
- Rank: Lieutenant General

Thomas C. Seamands became the U.S. Army's 48th Deputy Chief of Staff, G-1 on 26 May 2017. He is responsible for developing, managing, and executing manpower and personnel plans, programs, and policies for the total Army. Prior to this assignment, he served as the Commanding General of the United States Army Human Resources Command, Fort Knox, Kentucky.

== Early life and education ==
Lieutenant General Thomas C. Seamands earned a Bachelor of Science degree in Business Management from the University of Dayton and was commissioned through the ROTC program into the Adjutant General's (AG) Corps. He is a graduate of the AG Officer Basic Course, AG Officer Advanced Course, and the Army Command and General Staff College. He attained a Master of Science Degree in Management from Webster University, was the Army's Leadership and Management Fellow at the John F. Kennedy School of Government, Harvard University and a Fellow at MIT's Seminar XXI: Foreign Politics, International Relations and the National Interest.

== Military career ==
Lt. Gen. Seamands retired from his position as Army G-1 in August 2020. Prior to his appointment as Deputy Chief of Staff, G-1, Seamands was previously assigned as the Director of Personnel Management, Army G-1. In addition to his assignment as Commanding General of the Army Human Resources Command, his other command assignment include Commander, 82d Replacement Detachment, Fort Bragg, North Carolina; and Commander, 556th Personnel Services Battalion, 25th Infantry Division, Schofield Barracks, Hawaii.

Staff assignments include, Assistant Chief of Staff, G-1, 25th Infantry Division, Schofield Barracks, Hawaii; Assistant Chief of Staff, G-1, XVIII Airborne Corps, Fort Bragg, North Carolina; and Chief, General Officer Management Office, Office of the Army Chief of Staff, Pentagon. Seamands combat deployments include Assistant Chief of Staff, CJ-1, Multi-National Corps – Iraq.

Military offices
Preceded by James C. McConville	Deputy Chief of Staff for Personnel of the United States Army; 2017–2020	Succeeded by Gary M. Brito
