= Thomas P. Carney =

United States Army general (1941–2019)

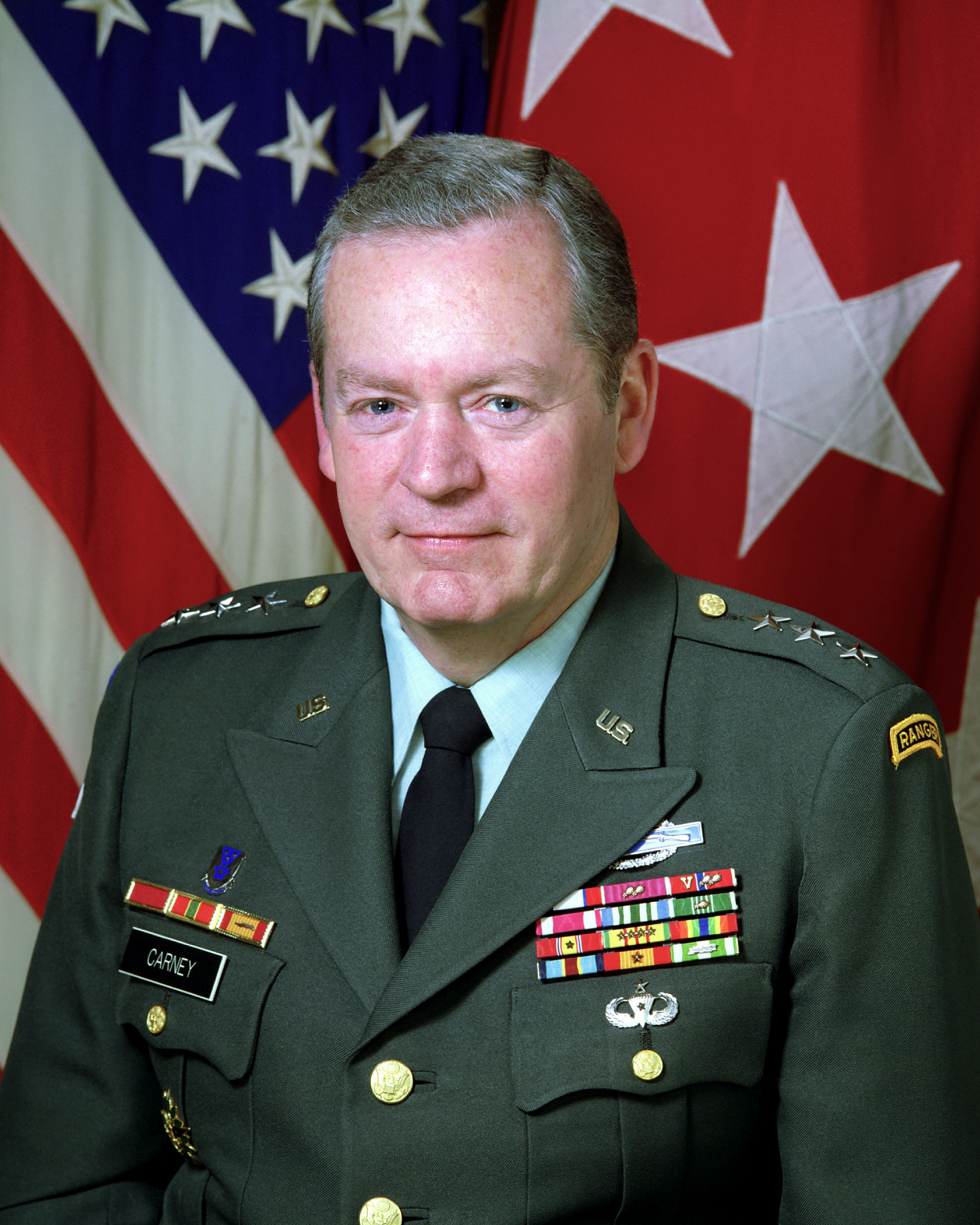
- Born: Thomas Patrick Carney; June 19, 1941; Cleveland, Ohio, US
- Died: July 20, 2019 (aged 78) Naples, Florida, US
- Branch: United States Army
- Service years: 1963–1994
- Rank: Lieutenant general
- Commands: Deputy Chief of Staff G-1 Personnel of The United States Army; 5th Infantry Division; U.S. Army Recruiting Command; 3rd Brigade, 2nd Infantry Division; 2nd Battalion, 87th Infantry Regiment
- Conflicts: Vietnam War

Thomas Patrick Carney (June 19, 1941 – July 20, 2019) was a lieutenant general in the United States Army who served as Deputy Chief of Staff G-1 Personnel of The United States Army from 1992 to 1994. Born and raised in Cleveland, he attended St. Ignatius High School and was elected president from the Class of 1959. Carney earned a B.S. degree from the United States Military Academy in 1963 and an M.S. degree in operations research from the Naval Postgraduate School in 1971. He received two Distinguished Service Medals and three awards of the Legion of Merit.

After his death, Carney was interred at Arlington National Cemetery on December 11, 2019.
