= Robert M. Elton =

United States Army general (1932–2024)

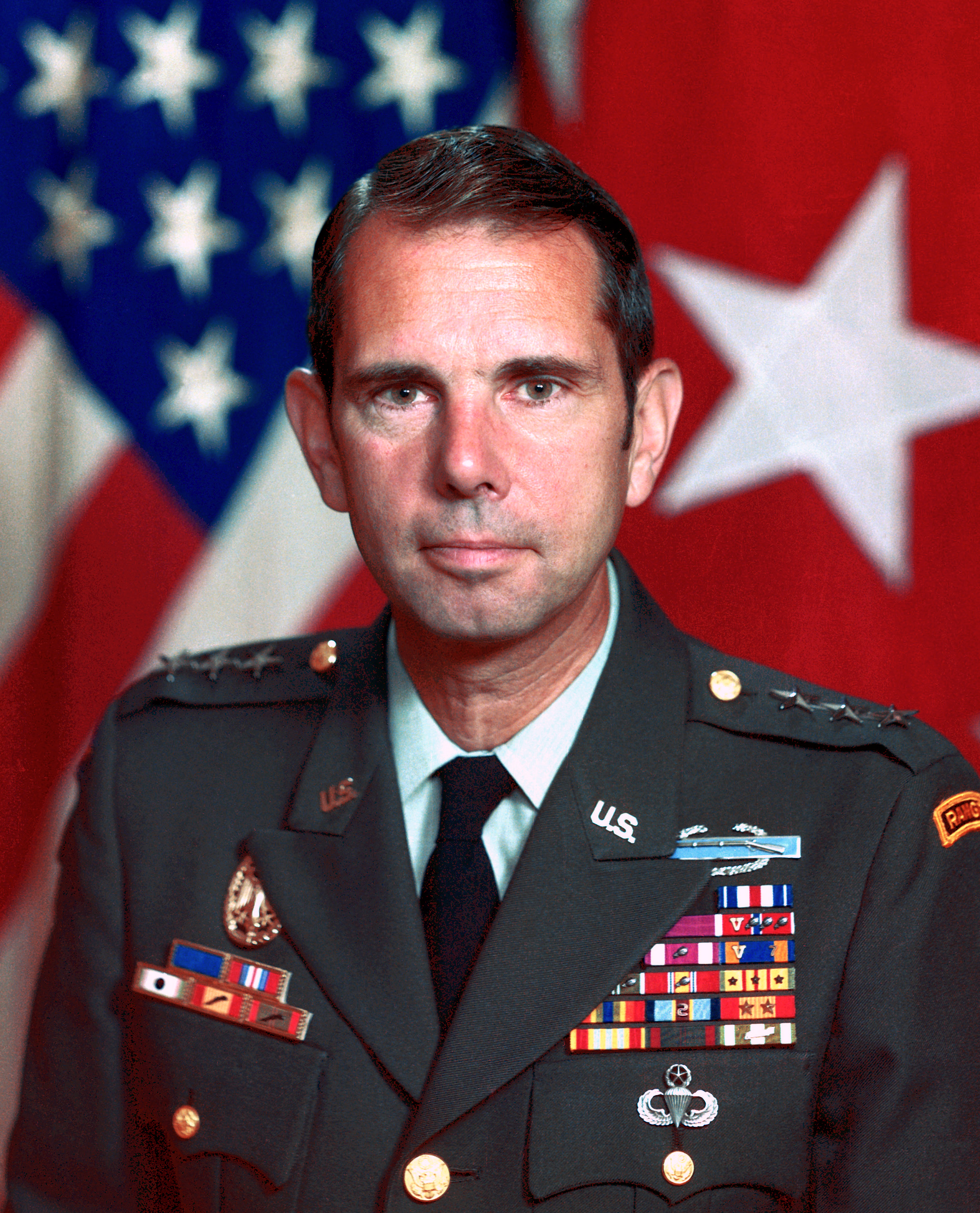
- Born: September 13, 1932; Cleveland, Ohio, U.S.
- Died: March 12, 2024 (aged 91) Boerne, Texas, U.S.
- Allegiance: United States of America
- Branch: United States Army
- Service years: 1954–1987
- Rank: Lieutenant General
- Commands: Deputy Chief of Staff G-1 Personnel of The United States Army; 9th Infantry Division; 2nd Brigade, 82nd Airborne Division; 3rd Battalion, 506th Infantry Regiment
- Conflicts: Vietnam War
- Awards: Silver Star Medal; Legion of Merit; Bronze Star Medal (4); Meritorious Service Medal (2); Air Medal (7)

Robert Moffat Elton (September 13, 1932 – March 12, 2024) was a United States Army lieutenant general who served as Deputy Chief of Staff G-1 Personnel of The United States Army from 1983 to 1987. He earned a B.S. degree from the United States Military Academy in June 1954 and an M.S. degree in engineering physics from the University of Virginia in 1963. He died on March 12, 2024.
