= Russell L. Vittrup =

American Army general

Russell Lowell Vittrup
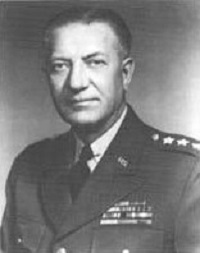
- Born: 28 July 1906; Rockdale, Texas
- Died: 7 December 1992 (aged 86); Washington, D.C.
- Military career
- Allegiance: United States
- Branch: United States Army
- Service years: 1929–1965
- Rank: Lieutenant General
- Commands: 24th Infantry Division; 33rd Infantry Regiment
- Conflicts: World War II
- Awards: Distinguished Service Medal; Legion of Merit (2); Bronze Star Medal

Russell Lowell Vittrup (28 July 1906 – 7 December 1992) was a United States Army lieutenant general who served as chief of staff of the United States European Command from June 1963 to June 1965. He previously served as the U.S. Army Deputy Chief of Staff for Personnel from 1961 to 1963.

== Early life and education ==
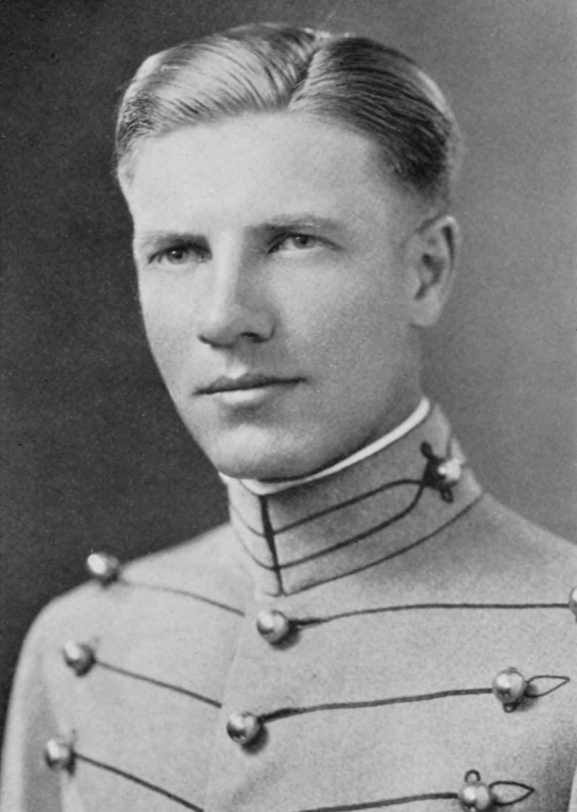
As a West Point cadet

Born in Rockdale, Texas and raised in Dallas, Vittrup attended Southern Methodist University for one year before being appointed to the United States Military Academy. He graduated with a B.S. degree in 1929 and was commissioned as a second lieutenant of infantry. Vittrup later graduated from the Army Command and General Staff College in 1941, the National War College in 1948 and the Army War College in 1951.

== Military career ==
During World War II, Vittrup served in a series of staff positions. In June 1943, he was assigned to Allied Force Headquarters in Algiers. He then moved with the headquarters to Italy, where he helped to plan the invasion of Southern France. During the last years of the war, Vittrup participated in the invasions of Southern France and Germany.

After the war, Vittrup commanded the 33rd Infantry Regiment at Fort Kobbe in the Panama Canal Zone. As a brigadier general, he was chief of the Army section of the Joint U.S. Military Assistance Group in Athens, Greece from August 1952 to September 1953. As a major general, Vittrup commanded the 24th Infantry Division in South Korea. In 1958, while serving as the Army’s deputy commander for operations in the Pacific, Vittrup negotiated a military aid package with Indonesia.

Vittrup was promoted to lieutenant general effective 1 April 1961. After serving as Deputy Chief of Staff for Personnel at the Pentagon, he was sent to Paris to serve as chief of staff of the U.S. European Command. He retired from active duty on 1 June 1965.

== Personal ==
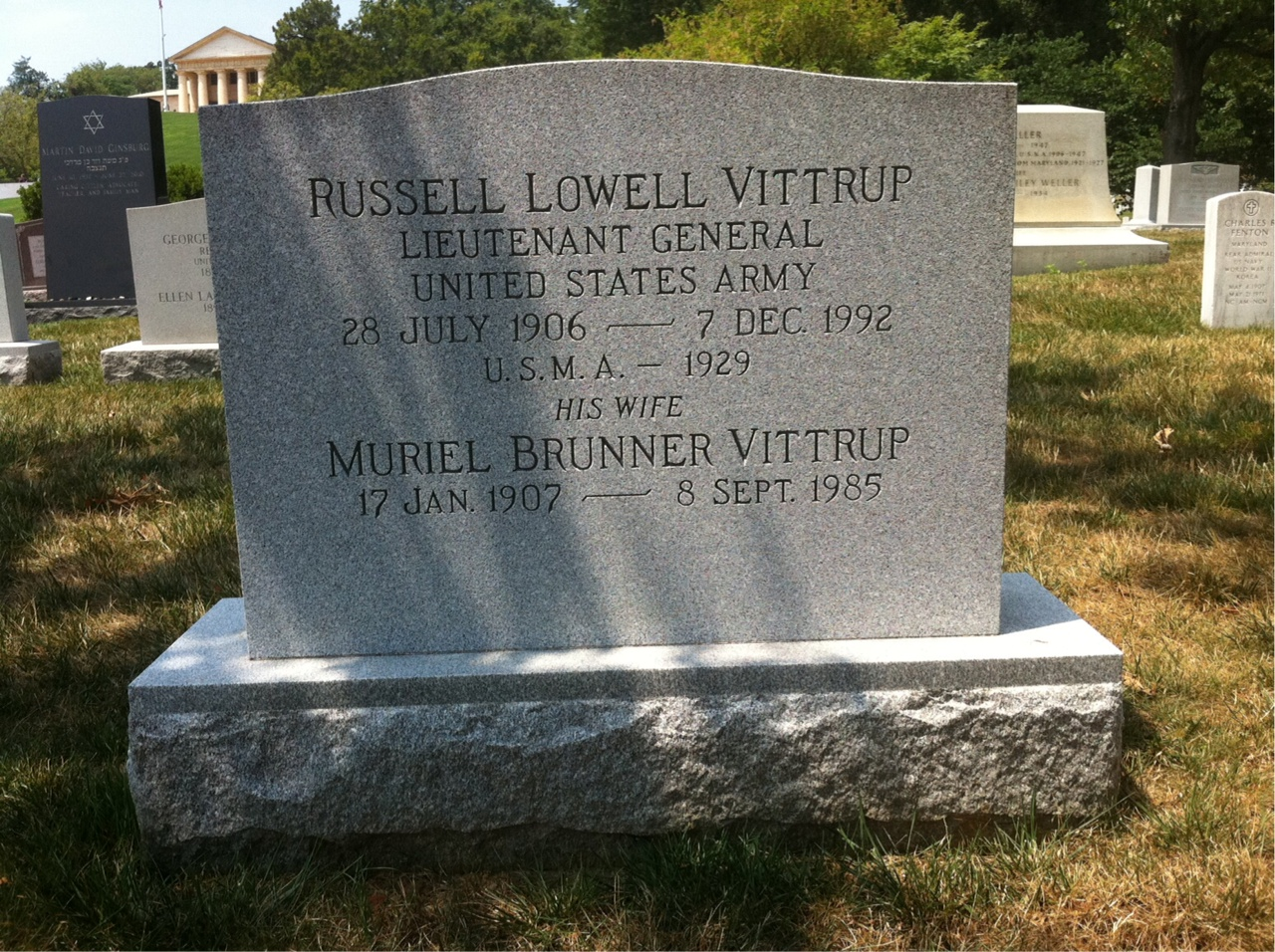
Vittrup's grave at Arlington National Cemetery

Vittrup married Muriel Louise Brunner (17 January 1907 – 8 September 1985) on 6 September 1930. They had a son, daughter and four grandchildren. Their son John Frederick Vittrup (20 April 1933 – 28 December 1968) was an U.S. Army major and physician.

Vittrup moved to Fort Belvoir, Virginia after the death of his wife. He died of cardiopulmonary arrest at the Walter Reed Army Medical Center. Vittrup and his wife were interred at Arlington National Cemetery.
