= Edgar Williamson Jr. =

American politician (1903–1981)

Edgar Williamson Jr. (November 24, 1903 - April 1981) was an American Republican Party politician who served four terms in the New Jersey General Assembly. He attended public schools in East Orange, New Jersey and worked as a Realtor and insurance executive. He was the Vice President of Firemen's Insurance Company. He served as a member of the East Orange Zoning Board of Adjustment, and as Chairman of the Essex County Young Republicans. He was elected to the New Jersey State Assembly in 1937, and was re-elected in 1938, 1939 and 1940. Williamson was a member of the Sons of the American Revolution and served as its President General from 1955 through 1956.

He was a descendant of Richard Williamson (1593–1659), who emigrated to the United States from England in 1607.
