= Douglas Stitt =

U.S. Army general

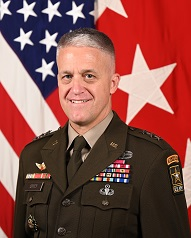
- Official portrait, 2024
- Education: Norwich University (BA); Canadian Forces Staff College (MDS); United States Army War College (MSS)
- Military career
- Allegiance: United States
- Branch: United States Army
- Service years: 1990–2024
- Rank: Lieutenant General
- Conflicts: War in Afghanistan; Iraq War
- Awards: Army Distinguished Service Medal; Legion of Merit (2); Bronze Star Medal
- Douglas Stitt's voice Stitt's opening statement at a House Armed Services Military Personnel Subcommittee hearing on the 2023 military personnel posture Recorded March 29, 2023

Douglas Fraser Stitt is a retired United States Army lieutenant general who last served as the deputy chief of staff for personnel of the United States Army. He previously served as the director of military personnel management.

== Early life ==
Stitt is the son of Janet A., and Wesley L. Stitt, a superintendent of the Ogdensburg City School District. He is a 1986 graduate of Ogdensburg Free Academy. He is a 1990 graduate of Norwich University.

== Career ==
In February 2022, he was nominated for promotion to lieutenant general and assignment as deputy chief of staff for personnel of the United States Army.

Military offices
Preceded by Joseph R. Calloway	Director of the Officer Personnel Management Directorate of the United States Army Human Resources Command; 2017–2019	Succeeded by Thomas J. Edwards Jr.
Preceded by Joseph R. Calloway	Director of Military Personnel Management of the United States Army; 2019–2022	Succeeded by Hope C. Rampy
Preceded by Gary Brito	Deputy Chief of Staff for Personnel of the United States Army; 2022–2024	Succeeded by Roy A. Wallace; Acting
