= 4th Brigade Combat Team, 1st Armored Division =

- 1st Armored Division shoulder sleeve insignia
- Active: 2008–2015
- Country: United States of America
- Branch: Regular Army
- Type: Armored
- Size: 4,000+
- Part of: 1st Armored Division
- Garrison/HQ: Fort Bliss
- Nickname: Highlander
- Mottos: Strength and Honor
- Engagements: Iraq War

Commanders
- Notable commanders: [[Peter Newell, D. Scott McKean]]

The 4th Brigade Combat Team, 1st Armored Division "Highlanders", was an armored brigade combat team (ABCT) of the 1st Armored Division, United States Army. The brigade was mechanized and its major combat equipment included the M1A2SEP Abrams tank, M2A3 & M3A3 Bradley infantry fighting vehicle, M109A6 Paladin howitzer, M1151 HMMWV and MRAP (armored vehicle).

== Current organization ==
At the time of their inactivation, 4th Brigade Combat Team, 1st Armored Division consisted of the following elements:

- 2nd Squadron, 13th Cavalry Regiment "Saber"
- 4th Battalion, 6th Infantry Regiment "Regulars"
- 1st Battalion, 77th Armor Regiment "Steel Tigers"
- 2nd Battalion, 29th Field Artillery Regiment "Pathfinders"
- 123rd Brigade Support Battalion "Iron Support"
- 2nd Engineer Battalion "Sapper Steel"

== Insignia ==
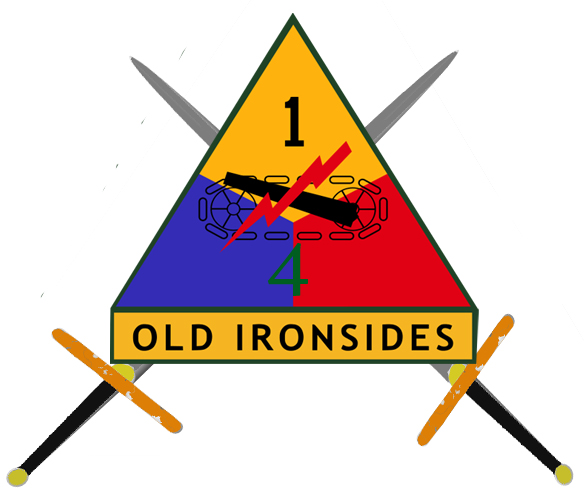
4th Brigade insignia is displayed prominently on Brigade Headquarters at Ft Bliss, TX

Soldiers assigned to the brigade wore the shoulder sleeve insignia of the 1st Armored Division. Each brigade within the 1st Armored Division created their own unique insignia in relation to their brigade nickname. The 4th Brigade's nickname was "The Highlander Brigade" and for that reason the 1st Armored Division Shoulder Sleeve insignia bearing the Arabic numeral 4 below the cannon and track symbols. The 4 is green, reminiscent of the second color of the Armor branch displayed on armor unit guidons. The shoulder sleeve insignia is that super imposed onto two crossed Scottish broadsword, weapons commonly associated with the highlands of Scotland.

The unit's nickname "Highlander" alluded to the West Texas highlands--Franklin Mountains (Texas)—surrounding Fort Bliss. Additionally, this is a historical reference to the 1st Armored Division's participation in campaigns across the North Apennine Mountains during World War II.

== Unit history ==
4th BCT was organized in 2005 at Fort Bliss, Texas. It was originally part of the 1st Cavalry Division. The brigade reflagged to the 1st Armored Division on 4 March 2008. The first commander of the Highlander Brigade was Colonel Stephen Twitty. The unit was the first brigade combat team to be activated at Fort Bliss from the 1st Armored Division. The division relocated to Fort Bliss in 2012 as a result of Base Realignment and Closure, 2005. On 25 June 2013, Army force restructuring plans were announced. As part of the plan, the division deactivated its 3rd Brigade Combat Team following its 2014 deployment to Afghanistan. The 4th BCT was reflagged as the 3rd Brigade Combat Team "Bulldog" in April 2015.

=== Operation Iraqi Freedom ===
Security Force Assistance: The unified action to generate, employ, and sustain local, host-nation, or regional security forces in support of legitimate authority.

— Field Manual 3-07, Oct2008.

The entire brigade deployed to the Iraq War in May 2009. The brigade was to be the proof of principle unit for the Advise and Assist Brigade concept also known as Brigade Combat Team-Stability (BCT-S/BCT-A). The 4th BCT, 1AD focused on security force assistance during the deployment. The unit operated in the Southern Iraqi provinces of Al Muthanna, Dhi Qar, and Maysan under Multinational Division, South (MND-S).

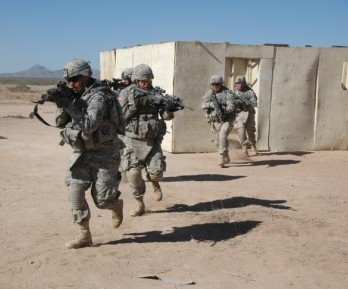
Highlander soldiers exit building at National Training Center, Fort Irwin, Calif.

=== Operation New Dawn ===
In August 2011 4th Brigade deployed to Iraq. All of 4th Brigade's battalions were assigned to bases and forward operating bases in the north and west of Iraq except for 1st Battalion, 77th Armor Regiment, which was based in southern Iraq and was assigned as the theater wide Quick Reaction Force directly under United States Army Central/Third Army. When the governments of the United States and Iraq could not come to an agreement regarding immunity for US personnel in Iraq 4th Brigade was one of the last units to withdraw from Iraq as part of the closing of Operation New Dawn.

=== Operation Enduring Freedom ===
Shortly after the brigade's return from Iraq in February 2012, members of the brigade were warned of another imminent deployment. 4th Brigade was selected by the Army as one of the new security forces advise and assist teams (SFAAT). These small teams would deployment to Afghanistan advising Afghan National Army and Afghan National Police command teams and staff from the battalion to corps level.

After a monthlong training rotation at the Joint Readiness Training Center at Fort Polk, Louisiana, the first of three groups of SFAATs deployed in May 2012. While soldiers were awarded the Purple Heart Purple Heart, no 4th Brigade soldiers died while deployed.

The 4th Brigade's commanding officer Colonel Terry Cook returned with the last of the teams and the brigade colors in June 2013.

=== Inactivated units ===
On 10 June 2015, Special Troops Battalion "Strike Force" was inactivated and replaced with the 2nd Engineer Battalion "Sapper Steel"
