= Theodore G. Stroup =

United States Army general

Theodore G. Stroup, Jr.
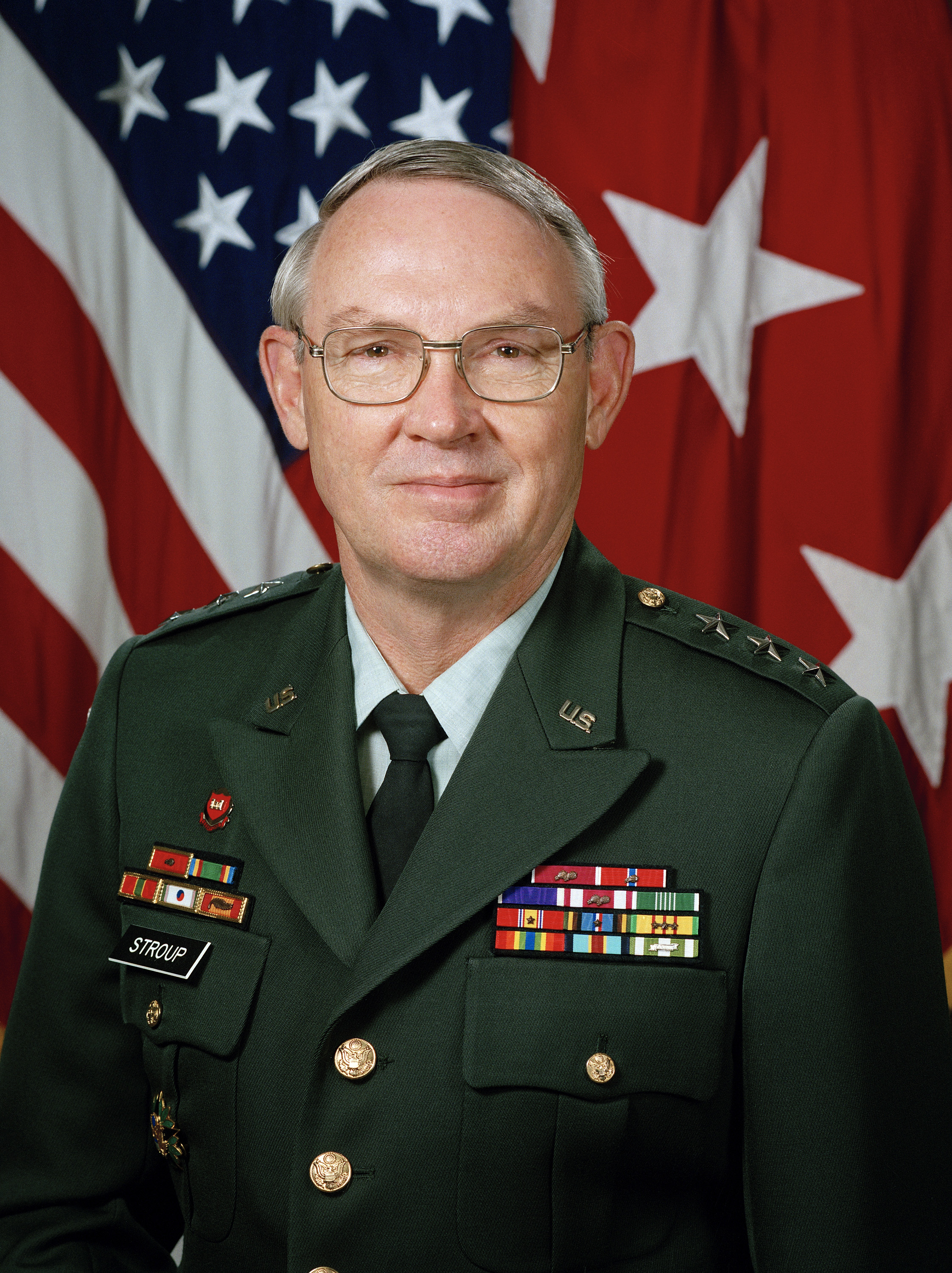
- Nickname: Ted
- Born: March 11, 1940 (age 86); St. Petersburg, Florida, U.S.
- Allegiance: United States of America
- Branch: United States Army
- Service years: 1962–1996
- Rank: Lieutenant General
- Commands: Deputy Chief of Staff G-1 Personnel of The United States Army; Fort Worth District, U.S. Army Corps of Engineers; 293rd Engineer Battalion, U.S. Army Europe; Company C, 864th Engineer Battalion
- Conflicts: Vietnam War
- Awards: Distinguished Service Medal Legion of Merit (3); Bronze Star Medal (2); Purple Heart; Meritorious Service Medal (3)

Theodore Glen Stroup, Jr. (born March 11, 1940) is a retired United States Army Lieutenant General (LTG) who served as Deputy Chief of Staff G-1 Personnel of The United States Army from 1994 to 1996.

LTG Stroup was commissioned through the United States Military Academy in 1962. He earned a master's degree in civil engineering from Texas A&M University in 1965 and is a registered professional engineer in Texas and Pennsylvania. Stroup later received an M.B.A. degree from The American University and graduated from the Army War College.
