= David H. Ohle =

American military officer (born 1944)

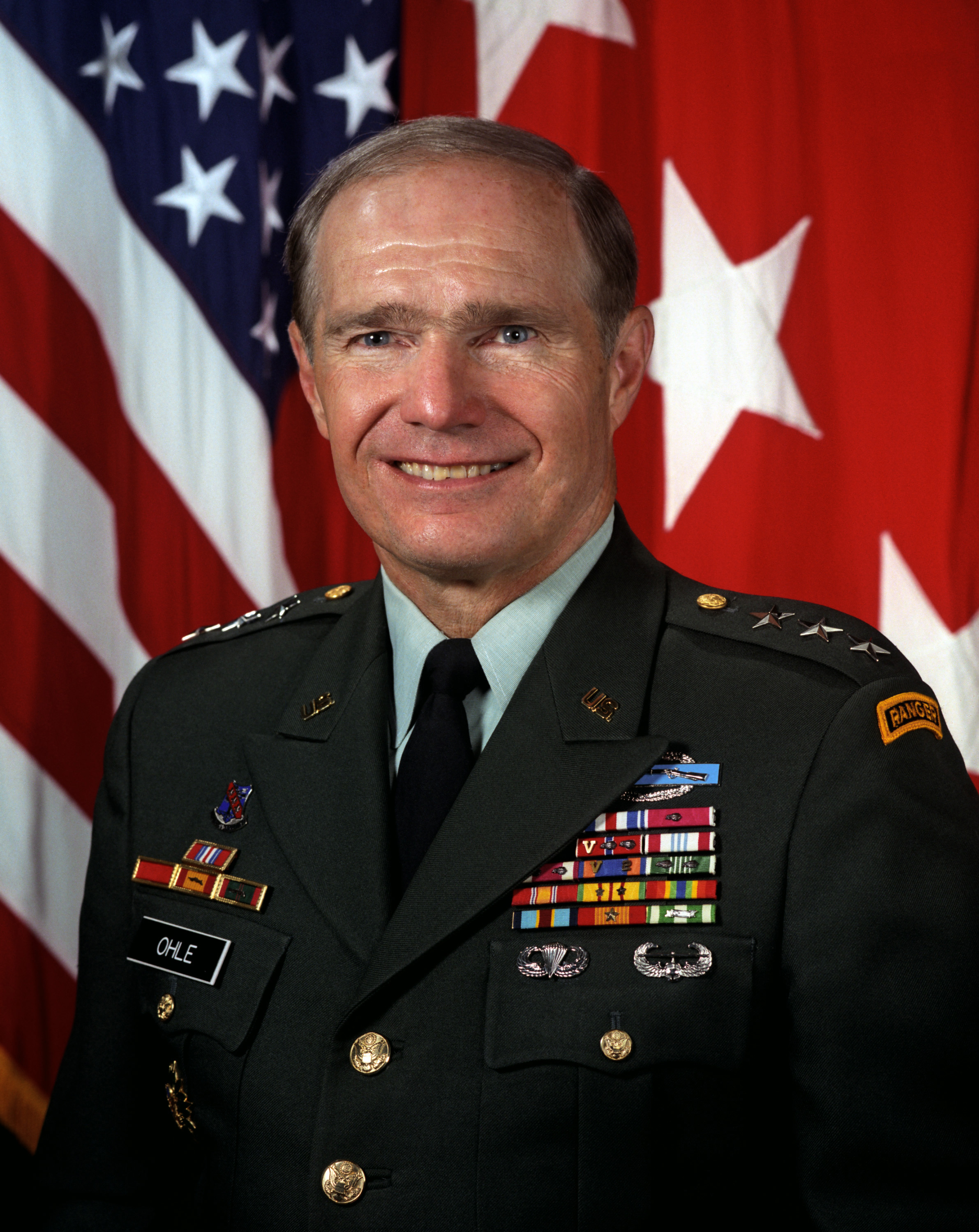
- Born: October 16, 1944 (age 81); Youngstown, Ohio, U.S.
- Allegiance: United States of America
- Branch: United States Army
- Service years: 1968–2000
- Rank: Lieutenant General
- Commands: Deputy Chief of Staff G-1 Personnel of The United States Army
- Conflicts: Vietnam War
- Awards: Silver Star Medal; Legion of Merit (2); Bronze Star Medal (3); Defense Meritorious Service Medal; Meritorious Service Medal (3); Air Medal (2)

David Henry Ohle (born October 16, 1944) is a retired United States Army lieutenant general who served as Deputy Chief of Staff G-1 Personnel of The United States Army from 1998 to 2000.

Born in Youngstown, Ohio and raised in Steubenville, Ohio, Ohle graduated from the United States Military Academy with a B.S. degree in 1968. He later earned an M.A. degree in psychology from the Ohio State University in 1974.

Ohle served two combat tours in Vietnam and commanded a Ranger company there. He was awarded the Silver Star Medal, three Bronze Star Medals and two Air Medals. Ohle later commanded an infantry battalion at Fort Campbell and an infantry brigade at Schofield Barracks. He subsequently served as assistant commander of the 1st Infantry Division at Fort Riley.
