= William H. Reno =

United States Army general

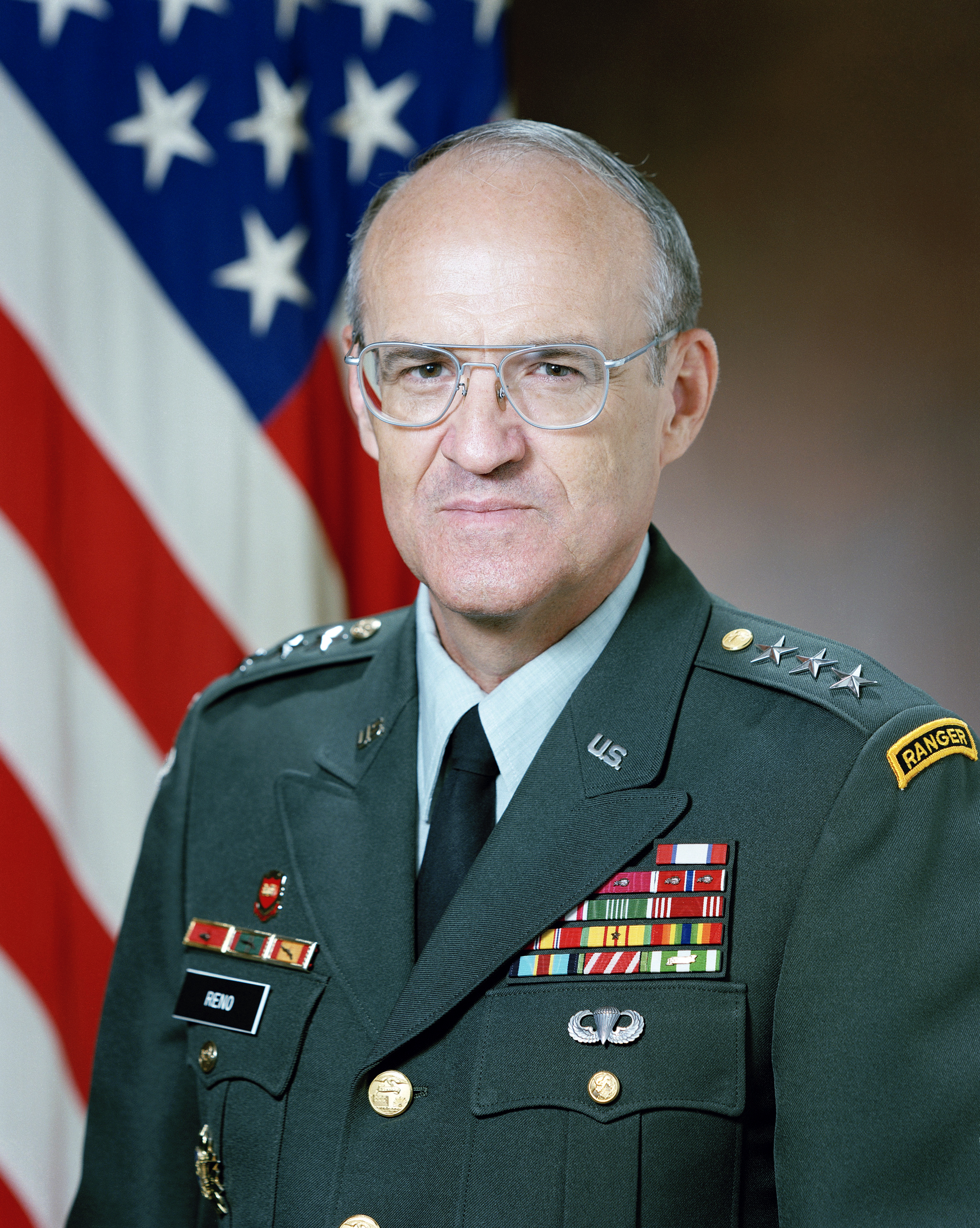
- Nickname: Bill
- Born: January 26, 1936 (age 90); Smithville, Oklahoma, U.S.
- Allegiance: United States of America
- Branch: United States Army
- Service years: 1954–1992
- Rank: Lieutenant General
- Commands: Deputy Chief of Staff G-1 Personnel of The United States Army; Memphis District, U.S. Army Corps of Engineers
- Conflicts: Vietnam War

William Henry Reno (born January 26, 1936) is a retired United States Army lieutenant general who served as Deputy Chief of Staff G-1 Personnel of The United States Army from 1990 to 1992. Born in Smithville, Oklahoma, he enlisted in the Army on August 23, 1954. Reno was subsequently appointed to the United States Military Academy and graduated in 1961 with a B.S. degree in military science. He later attended Princeton University, earning both an M.A. degree and an M.S. degree in civil engineering in 1967.
