= Robert G. Yerks =

American lieutenant general (1928–2021)

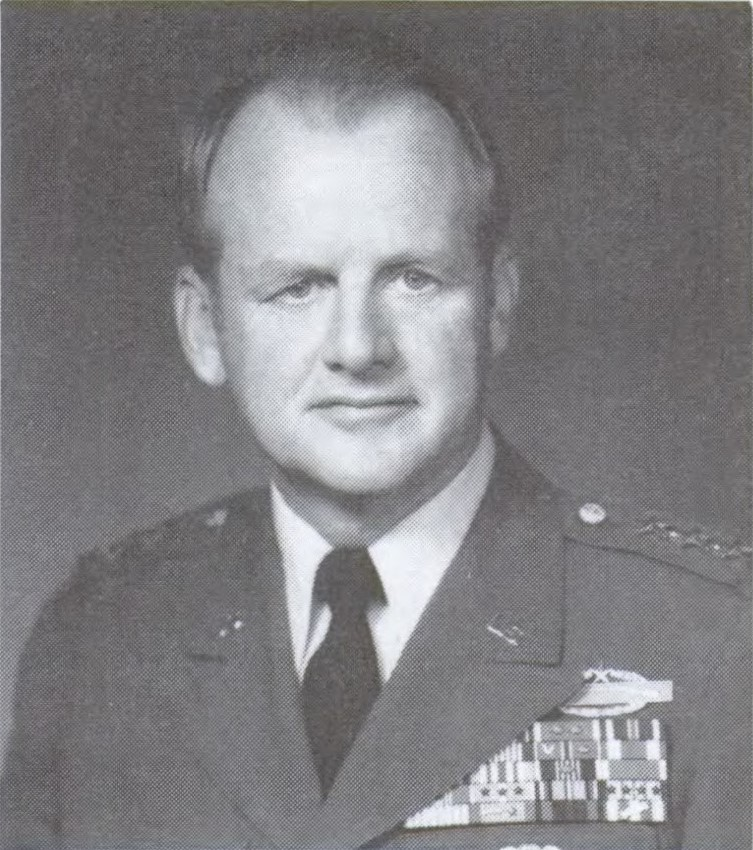
- Born: October 24, 1928; Ossining, New York, U.S.
- Died: July 25, 2021 (aged 92) Buckeye, Arizona, U.S.
- Buried: Arlington National Cemetery
- Allegiance: United States
- Branch: United States Army
- Service years: 1951–1981
- Rank: Lieutenant General
- Commands: Deputy Chief of Staff G-1 Personnel of The United States Army; United States Army War College; United States Army Military District of Washington; 1st Brigade, 2nd Infantry Division; 2nd Battalion, 327th Infantry Regiment
- Conflicts: Korean War; Vietnam War
- Awards: Distinguished Service Medal; Silver Star Medal (2); Legion of Merit (3); Distinguished Flying Cross; Soldier's Medal; Bronze Star Medal (5); Purple Heart (2); Meritorious Service Medal; Air Medal (11)

Robert George Yerks (October 24, 1928 – July 25, 2021) was a United States Army lieutenant general who served as Deputy Chief of Staff G-1 Personnel of The United States Army from 1978 to 1981.

Yerks was a 1951 graduate of the United States Military Academy. He was deployed to Korea with the 15th Infantry, 3rd Infantry Division in 1952, earning two Bronze Star Medals and a Purple Heart. Yerks graduated from the Army Command and General Staff College in 1961 and the Armed Forces Staff College in 1964. From May 1967 to May 1968, he was deployed to Vietnam where he commanded the 2nd Battalion, 327th Infantry, 101st Airborne Division and earned two Silver Star Medals, the Distinguished Flying Cross, the Soldier's Medal, three more Bronze Star Medals and a second Purple Heart. In July 1970, Yerks became commander of the 1st Brigade, 2nd Infantry Division in Korea.

Promoted to brigadier general, Yerks served as assistant commander of the 9th Infantry Division at Fort Lewis. As a major general, he served as commanding officer of the Military District of Washington from August 1, 1975 to July 15, 1977. On August 1, 1977, he became commandant of the Army War College. As Deputy Chief of Staff for Personnel, Yerks launched the Army's "Be All You Can Be" recruiting campaign.

== Later life ==
After retirement, Yerks worked for the International Trust Company in Monrovia, Liberia. In 2000, he was nominated to receive the Nobel Peace Prize for his contribution to ending the Liberian Civil War. In 2007, Yerks was conferred an honorary Doctor of Humanities degree by Eastern Kentucky University. He is the last man since Theodore Roosevelt to be nominated for both a United States Medal of Honor and a Nobel Peace Prize.

== Personal ==
Yerks married Iris Alma Charlotte Anderson (April 19, 1929 – April 6, 2013) on June 10, 1951 in Ossining, New York. The couple had five sons, five daughters and twenty-five grandchildren.
