= Howard B. Bromberg =

United States Army general

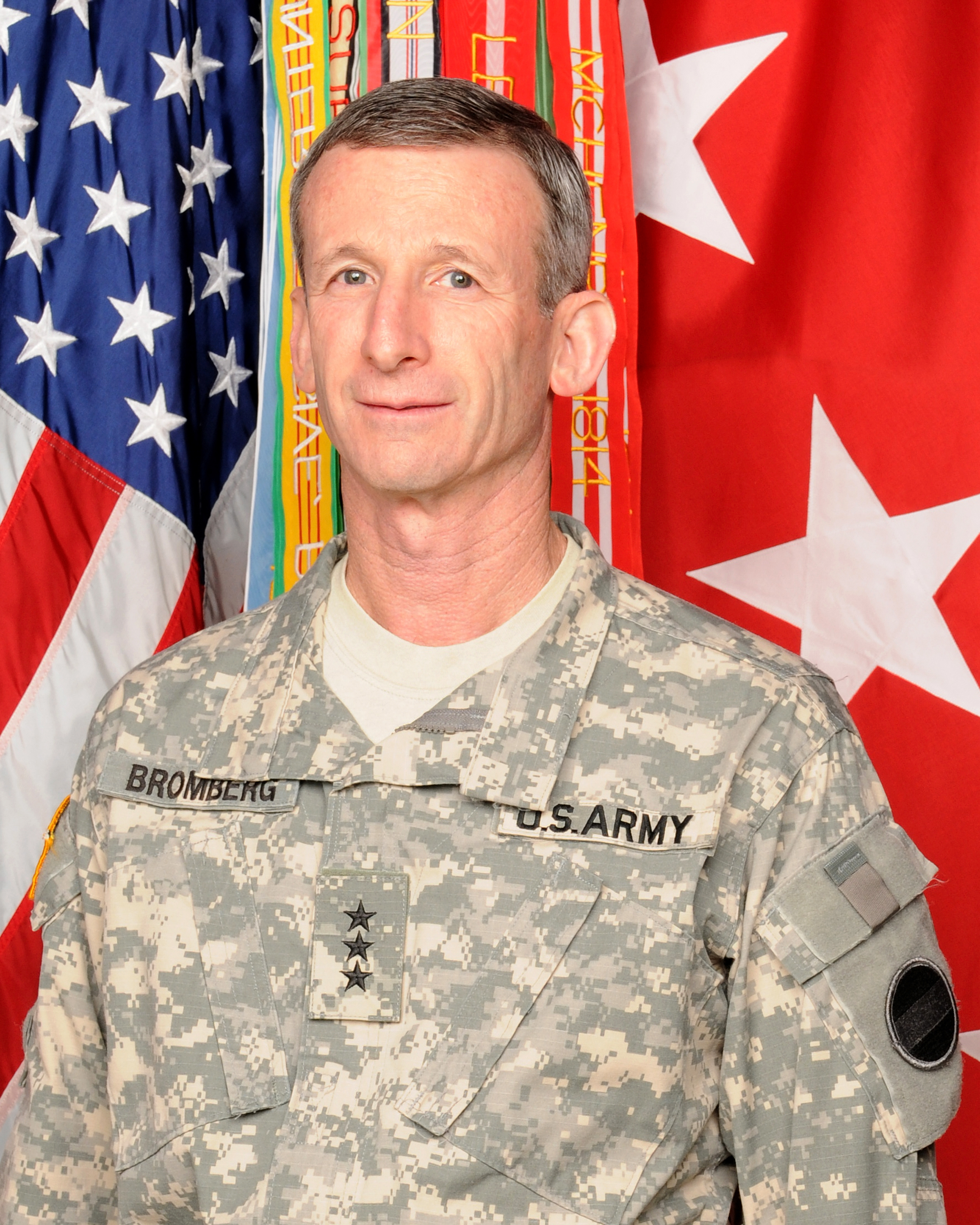
- Lieutenant General Howard B. Bromberg
- Children: 2
- Military career
- Allegiance: United States
- Branch: United States Army
- Service years: 1977–2015
- Rank: Lieutenant General
- Commands: Fort Bliss; 32nd Army Air and Missile Defense Command; 11th Air Defense Artillery Brigade; 1st Battalion, 43rd Air Defense Artillery Regiment
- Conflicts: Gulf War
- Awards: Army Distinguished Service Medal (3); Defense Superior Service Medal (2); Legion of Merit (4); Bronze Star Medal; Purple Heart

Howard B. Bromberg is a retired United States Army lieutenant general. He was commissioned as an Air Defense Artillery officer in 1977.

== Early life and education ==
Bromberg was born to a Jewish family in California.

Bromberg attended the University of California, Davis, where he graduated with a bachelor's degree in agricultural economics and management.

== Military career ==
Bromberg started his military life in 1977, as a second lieutenant in the Air Defense Artillery (ADA). As an officer in the ADA, he held many commands throughout his long military career. He commanded all aspects from a platoon on up to installation commander. In October 2014 Bromberg completed 37 years in the United States Army, serving as a lieutenant general. Bromberg is currently the vice president and deputy for strategy and business development, air and missile defense for Lockheed Martin Corporation.

As the United States Army Deputy Chief of Staff, G–1, Bromberg acted as the responsible official to the ASA (M&RA), providing advice and assistance to the ASA (MR&A), this was in addition to his responsibilities and authorities as deputy chief of staff, G–1 on the Army Staff.
