= KMAC Museum =

American art museum

KMAC Contemporary Art Museum
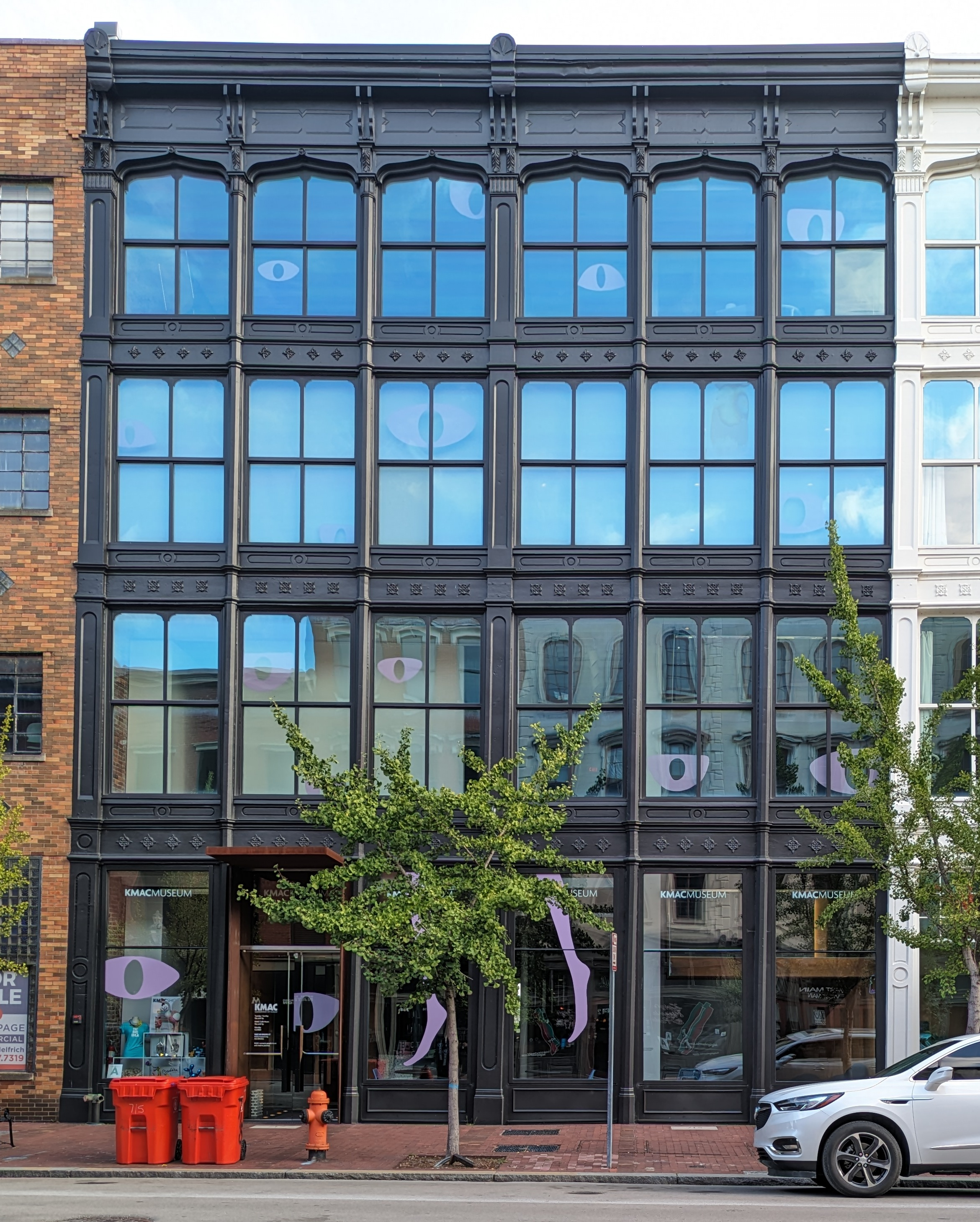
- Established: 1981
- Location: 715 West Main Street; Louisville, Kentucky 40202
- Coordinates: 38.257471°N 85.76226°W
- Type: Contemporary art
- Director: Michelle E. Staggs
- Website: www.kmacmuseum.org

KMAC Contemporary Art Museum is an American art museum that "connects people to Art and Creative Practice". The museum is a 501c3 organization located in the West Main District of downtown Louisville, Kentucky.

== History ==
The museum was founded in 1981 as the Kentucky Art and Craft Foundation to build interest in the state's craft heritage which quickly led to a one of a kind collection of American Folk Art from the region. In 2001, the organization relocated to its current home, a four-story historic cast iron structure. At that time, the organization changed its name to the Kentucky Museum of Art and Craft, still focusing on contemporary Kentucky artisans. The new building provided more gallery space for exhibitions and educational programs.

In 2016, after closing nearly for a year, the organization completed a $3 million renovation and restoration of the Main Street building by Christoff: Finio Architects, NY., formally changed the name to KMAC Contemporary Art Museum and achieved sponsorship of free daily admission. The museum now offers free programming for 100,000 students, community members and tourists, alike. KMAC Museum is currently enrolled in the American Alliance of Museums accreditation program.

The museum is near the Kentucky Science Center, the Louisville Slugger Museum & Factory, the Frazier History Museum and the Muhammad Ali Center, which gives the nickname of the area as "Museum Row".

== See also ==
- List of attractions and events in the Louisville metropolitan area
