= Sons of the American Revolution =

Patriotic lineage organization of the United States

- Abbreviation: SAR
- Named after: American Revolution
- Predecessor: Sons of Revolutionary Sires
- Established: April 30, 1889 (137 years ago)
- Founded at: Fraunces Tavern, New York City
- Type: Non-profit, patriotic lineage society; service organization
- Tax ID no.: 53-0116355
- Legal status: Federally chartered nonprofit corporation
- Headquarters: 809 West Main Street, Louisville, Kentucky, U.S.
- Coordinates: 38°15′28″N 85°45′49″W
- Region served: Worldwide
- Members: ~39,000 (2026)
- Official language: English
- President General: W. Allen Greenly
- Secretary General: T. Brooks Lyles
- Treasurer General: K. Scott Collins
- Chancellor General: Tracy A. Pounders
- Publication: SAR Magazine; The SAR Colorguardsman (e-magazine); Spirit of '76 (Note: The precursor of the SAR Magazine, circulated from 1894 to 1906.)
- Affiliations: Daughters of the American Revolution; Children of the American Revolution
- Website: sar.org

The Sons of the American Revolution (SAR), formally the National Society of the Sons of the American Revolution (NSSAR), is a federally chartered, lineage‑based membership organization for men who can document direct descent from a patriot of the American Revolution. Founded in 1889 at Fraunces Tavern in New York City, the Society promotes the study and interpretation of the Revolutionary era, supports educational and civic programs related to American independence, and encourages public engagement with the nation's founding principles. Membership is open to individuals who can demonstrate lineal descent from persons who rendered military, civil, or recognized patriotic service in support of the Revolution, and the organization operates through a national headquarters in Louisville, Kentucky, along with state societies and local chapters across the United States and abroad.

The SAR traces part of its institutional heritage to the Sons of Revolutionary Sires, a California lineage organization founded in 1876 during the Centennial celebrations of American independence. Its national formation in 1889 emerged from organizational disagreements with the earlier Sons of the Revolution (SR), whose structure required state societies to remain subordinate to the New York Society. William Osborne McDowell, a New Jersey civic leader, organized the SAR as an independent national body and later assisted in founding the Daughters of the American Revolution (DAR), establishing parallel hereditary societies for men and women descended from Revolutionary patriots.

The Society sponsors youth scholarship contests, awards for public service and civic achievement, historical commemorations, genealogical research initiatives, and partnerships with educational and veterans organizations. Its efforts contributed to the establishment of national observances such as Constitution Day, Flag Day, and Bill of Rights Day. The SAR maintains state‑level societies across the United States and international societies in Europe and other regions.

The National Society operates the SAR Genealogical Research Library and is developing the SAR Education Center and Museum, which houses a collection of Revolutionary‑era artifacts at its Louisville headquarters. It publishes the quarterly SAR Magazine, annual proceedings of its National Congress, and historical yearbooks documenting its membership and activities. The Society received its federal charter on June 9, 1906, signed by President Theodore Roosevelt, who was himself a member.

== History ==
The SAR traces its origins to late‑19th‑century hereditary and patriotic movements and developed into a national organization with state societies and local chapters. Its history includes early organizational debates, federal recognition, and participation in major national commemorations.

The earliest hereditary society formed to honor the Patriots of the American Revolution was the Sons of Revolutionary Sires (SRS), founded in San Francisco on July 4, 1876, during the Centennial celebrations of the Declaration of Independence. The SRS brought together descendants of Revolutionary War participants who wished to commemorate the nation's founding and preserve the memory of those who supported American independence. When the National Society of the Sons of the American Revolution (SAR) was established in 1889, the SRS affiliated with the new national organization and reorganized as the California Society of the SAR, a continuity noted in early SAR Yearbooks.

A separate lineage society, the Sons of the Revolution (SR), had been founded earlier in New York City on February 22, 1876, by John Austin Stevens. Stevens envisioned an exclusive hereditary society modeled on the Society of the Cincinnati, with centralized authority vested in the New York society.

In 1889, William Osborne McDowell, a New Jersey businessman and civic leader, attempted to organize a New Jersey branch of the SR. McDowell objected to the SR's requirement that all state societies remain subordinate to New York and advocated instead for a national, broadly accessible organization of descendants of Revolutionary patriots.

On April 30, 1889, the centennial of George Washington's first inauguration, McDowell organized the National Society of the Sons of the American Revolution at Fraunces Tavern in New York City and became its first registered member. Later that same year, McDowell collaborated with six women to establish the Daughters of the American Revolution (DAR), creating parallel lineage organizations for men and women descended from Revolutionary‑era figures.

=== Early state societies ===
In the months surrounding the formation of the National Society, state‑level societies were organized rapidly across the country. Several had already been established prior to the national founding—including California, whose lineage traces to the Sons of Revolutionary Sires (1876)—while others formed in the weeks and months that followed. Early SAR publications, including Historical Notes of the Sons of the American Revolution (1890), record the following state societies and their dates of organization:

State Societies of the Sons of the American Revolution (Founding Dates)
State Society	Date Organized	Notes
California	July 4, 1876	Organized during the national Centennial celebrations, the Sons of Revolutionary Sires reflected California's strong civic‑patriotic culture in the late 19th century. Its 1889 reorganization into the California SAR aligned the society with the newly standardized national structure, making California one of the few states whose SAR roots pre‑date the National Society itself.
New York	December 4, 1883	First state formed as the Sons of the American Revolution; later renamed as Empire State Society SAR. New York's early organization grew out of prominent hereditary‑patriotic circles in Manhattan and Brooklyn, including descendants active in the New‑York Historical Society. Its 1883 founding provided the structural model later adopted by the National Society in 1889, giving New York a unique role as both precursor and anchor of the SAR's national identity.
New Jersey	March 7, 1889	Formed just weeks before the National Society, New Jersey's early membership drew heavily from Trenton and Newark civic leaders involved in Revolutionary War commemorations at Washington's Crossing and Monmouth. This gave the society a strong interpretive focus on New Jersey's battlefield heritage from the outset. The first SAR membership number was assigned to New Jersey.
Connecticut	April 2, 1889	Connecticut's founding reflected the state's deep tradition of town‑based historical societies and genealogical research. Early members included descendants active in the Connecticut Historical Society and local commemorations of the state's militia and Continental Line, giving the society a strong documentary orientation.
Vermont	April 2, 1889	Vermont's early SAR leadership emerged from civic groups celebrating the legacy of the Green Mountain Boys and Ethan Allen. The society's initial membership emphasized frontier‑Revolution narratives and the preservation of local militia records, many of which were held in town clerks' offices.
New Hampshire	April 24, 1889	New Hampshire's formation was closely tied to Portsmouth and Concord historical circles documenting the state's early resistance to British taxation. Its proximity to the National Society's founding date made New Hampshire one of the last pre‑National organizations, contributing to the rapid consolidation of New England SAR activity.
Alabama	June 18, 1889	As the first post‑National state society, Alabama's founding demonstrated the SAR's swift expansion into the South. Early members included Birmingham and Montgomery civic leaders involved in state‑level commemorations of Revolutionary‑era frontier settlements and early territorial governance.
Tennessee	December 2, 1889	Tennessee's early SAR activity drew from Nashville and Knoxville historical organizations documenting the state's Revolutionary‑era frontier militias, including the Overmountain Men. This gave the society a distinctive regional identity rooted in trans‑Appalachian Revolutionary history.
Minnesota	December 26, 1889	Organized by St. Paul and Minneapolis civic leaders during the SAR's rapid expansion into the Upper Midwest; early membership drew from descendants involved in regional historical societies documenting pioneer settlement.
Arkansas	1889	Established sometime in 1889, with founding activity centered in Little Rock; the 1890 Notes record Arkansas as one of the earliest Southern societies formed after the National Society, though the precise date was not preserved.
Wisconsin	January 14, 1890	Founded during the Midwest's rapid organizational push following the 1889 national reorganization; early membership drew heavily from Milwaukee civic leaders
Indiana	January 16, 1890	Organized by Indianapolis attorneys and judges who had previously participated in Centennial‑era commemorations, reflecting strong legal‑professional leadership in the society's formation.
Michigan	January 18, 1890	Formed through Detroit historical circles that had collaborated with the Michigan Pioneer and Historical Society, giving the SAR a foundation in existing genealogical networks.
Delaware	January 29, 1890	Established by Wilmington descendants active in Revolutionary‑era commemorations; early membership overlapped with the Delaware Historical Society's patriotic programming.
West Virginia	January 31, 1890	Organized soon after statehood's 25th anniversary, with founding members emphasizing West Virginia's unique Civil War–era separation from Virginia and its Revolutionary‑era frontier heritage.
Illinois	February 11, 1890	Built on Chicago's strong tradition of hereditary and veterans' organizations; early officers included prominent civic reformers involved in the city's historical societies.
Virginia	February 12, 1890	Formed by Virginia congressmen meeting in Washington, D.C.; the founding president was The Honorable William Wirt Henry, grandson of Patrick Henry, giving the society unusually direct lineage to a major Patriot leader.
Rhode Island	February 1890	Organized shortly after Illinois by Providence descendants active in early Rhode Island colonial‑heritage groups; the society emphasized Rhode Island's naval contributions to the Revolution.
South Carolina	April 18, 1890	Organized one day before North Carolina. South Carolina's early SAR leadership drew from Charleston and Columbia civic groups involved in commemorations of the state's Revolutionary‑era backcountry campaigns, including Cowpens and Kings Mountain. The society's founding reflected strong interest in documenting Patriot militia traditions and the state's influential role in the Southern theater.
North Carolina	April 19, 1890	North Carolina's Patriots Day founding underscored the state's longstanding emphasis on Revolutionary heritage, particularly the Mecklenburg Resolves and the Overmountain campaign. Early members included leaders from Raleigh and Charlotte historical societies who were active in preserving colonial and frontier records.
Georgia	February 14, 1891	Georgia's formation reflected growing SAR momentum across the South in the early 1890s. Early membership centered in Atlanta and Savannah, drawing from genealogical circles documenting families connected to the state's Revolutionary frontier, coastal defenses, and early political leadership.
Massachusetts	April 19, 1891	Massachusetts' Patriots Day founding aligned the society with the state's deep commemorative traditions surrounding Lexington and Concord. Early members included Boston‑area historians and descendants active in the Massachusetts Historical Society, giving the organization a strong documentary and interpretive foundation.
Maryland	April 21, 1891	Early hereditary activity was SR (1876); SAR society formed later. Maryland's SAR grew out of earlier hereditary‑patriotic activity associated with the Sons of Revolutionary Sires, which had a presence in Baltimore during the Centennial era. The 1891 SAR organization formalized this lineage interest, drawing from civic leaders engaged in preserving records of Maryland's Continental Line and early state governance.
Pennsylvania	April 23, 1893	Early hereditary activity was SR (1876); SAR society formed later. Although Pennsylvania had Centennial‑era hereditary groups, its SAR society was not formally organized until 1893. Early leadership came from Philadelphia and Pittsburgh historical circles documenting the state's pivotal Revolutionary contributions, including Valley Forge, the Continental Congress, and Pennsylvania's militia structure.
France	September 16, 1897	The France Society, established in Paris, was the SAR's first overseas chapter and reflected the organization's commitment to commemorating Franco‑American cooperation during the Revolution. Early membership included American expatriates and French descendants connected to officers who served under Rochambeau, Lafayette, and de Grasse. SAR France was driven by General Horace Porter, former President General of the National SAR (1892–1897), who had just been appointed U.S. Ambassador to France.

=== Federal charter ===
On June 9, 1906, the National Society of the Sons of the American Revolution received a congressional charter under Title 36 of the United States Code. The act, signed by U.S. President Theodore Roosevelt, formally recognized the SAR as a patriotic and historical society with a national public mission.

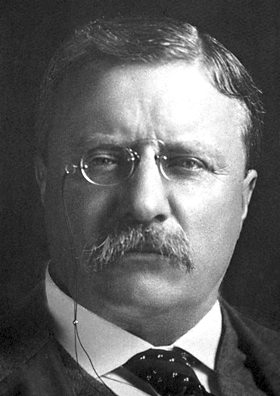
U.S. President Theodore Roosevelt, member of the Sons of the American Revolution, signed the federal charter on June 9, 1906.

The charter placed the SAR among a small group of hereditary and commemorative organizations granted federal recognition during the early 20th century, including the Daughters of the American Revolution and the American Legion. Congressional charters of this era were intended to acknowledge organizations that contributed to civic education, historical preservation, and patriotic instruction.

The SAR charter outlined the Society's purposes, including:

- perpetuating the memory of the men and women of the American Revolution;
- promoting historical research and the preservation of documents and relics;
- fostering true patriotism and love of country;
- maintaining and extending institutions of American freedom.

The act also established the SAR as a non‑profit corporation, defined its governance structure, and authorized it to hold property, receive bequests, and conduct national programs in support of its educational mission. Federal recognition strengthened the Society's ability to collaborate with government agencies, museums, and schools in developing historical and commemorative initiatives.

Congress amended the charter in 2007 to update corporate governance provisions and clarify the Society's authority to operate as a modern non‑profit organization.

== Membership ==
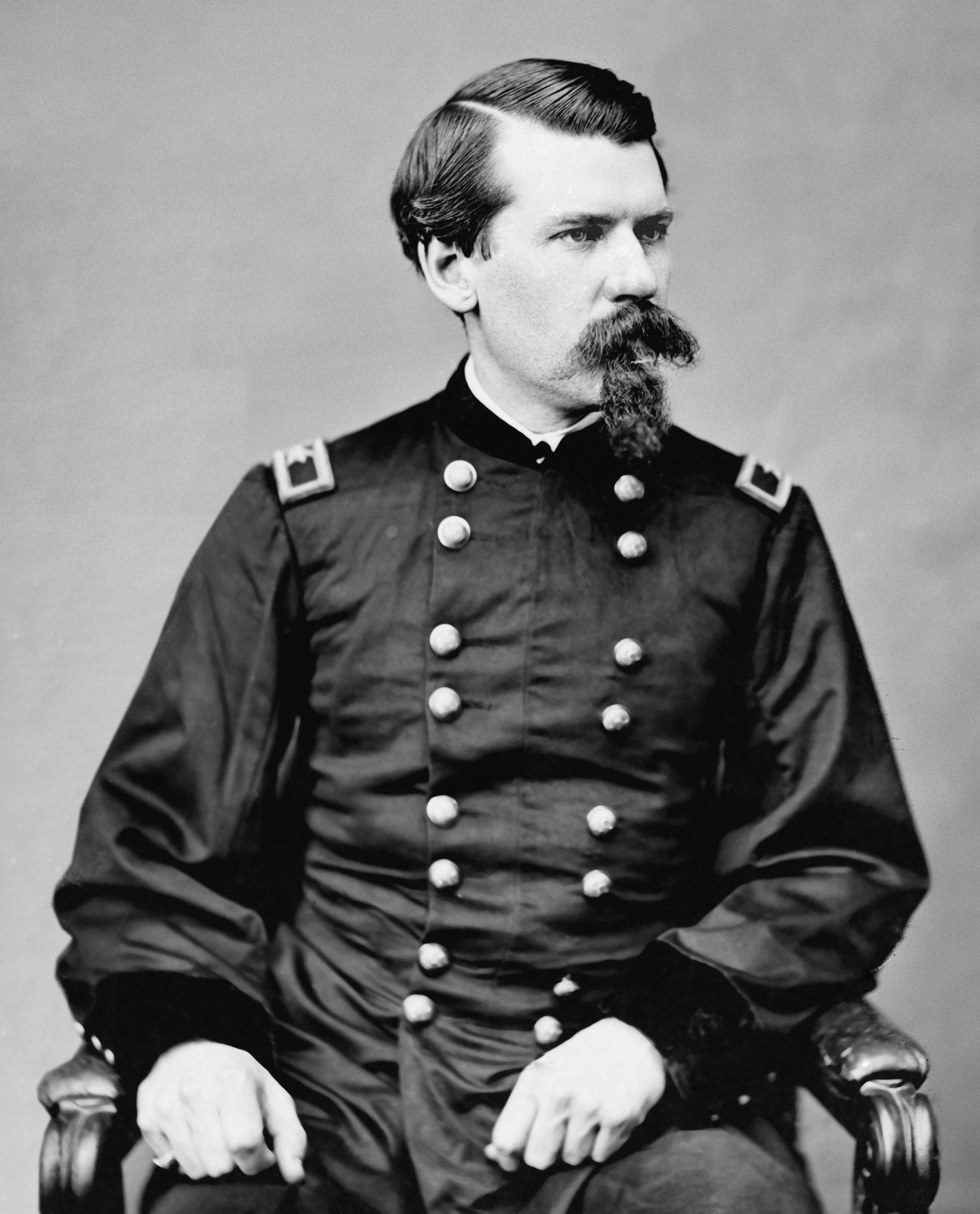
U.S. Army Brevet Brigadier General Horace Porter, president general from 1892 to 1897.

Membership in the National Society of the Sons of the American Revolution (SAR) is open to any male who can demonstrate lineal descent from a Patriot who supported the cause of American independence during the American Revolution. The SAR defines a Patriot as an individual (male or female) who rendered acceptable military, civil, or patriotic service between 1775 and 1783.

Applicants must provide documented proof of lineal bloodline descent from a Patriot ancestor, typically through birth, marriage, and death records, along with historical evidence of the ancestor's qualifying service. Applications are reviewed at the chapter, state, and national levels before approval.

The SAR permits the use of DNA evidence as supporting documentation in membership applications when used in conjunction with traditional genealogical records; however, DNA results alone are not accepted as proof of lineal descent.

=== Qualifying patriot service ===
The SAR recognizes several categories of qualifying service, including military, civil, and patriotic contributions that supported American independence.

- Military service — Service in the Continental Army, Continental Navy, Continental Marines, state militias, or state navies.
- Civil service — Service in governmental or administrative roles supporting the Revolutionary cause, including members of Committees of safety, colonial or state legislatures, and other recognized civil offices.
- Patriotic service — Non‑military contributions that materially aided the Revolution, such as furnishing supplies, signing oaths of allegiance, taking association tests, providing transportation or logistical support, or performing other documented acts that advanced the Patriot cause. This category also includes payment of Revolutionary War–era supply taxes, which were levied to procure provisions and materials for the American forces.
- Foreign service in support of American independence — Soldiers and sailors from allied nations, including France, Spain, the Dutch Republic, and various German states, whose service in North America or in direct support of American independence is recognized by the SAR.

Although the SAR generally recognizes qualifying service performed between April 19, 1775, and November 26, 1783, certain documented acts of support that occurred before the outbreak of hostilities are also accepted. These exceptions include participation in events such as the Boston Tea Party (1773) and the Battle of Point Pleasant (1774), both of which are recognized by the SAR as valid patriotic service when properly documented.

=== Application process ===
Prospective members typically apply through a local chapter, which assists with genealogical documentation and verification. Approved applications are forwarded to the state society and then to the national organization for final review. Members may file supplemental applications to recognize additional Patriot ancestors.

No state society or chapter may discriminate against an applicant on the basis of race or creed. The Sons of the American Revolution claims a membership of over 38,5000 members in over 550 chapters representing all 50 states in the United States, as well as societies in Canada, France, Spain, Germany, Switzerland, and the United Kingdom. Overall, more than 200,000 descendants have been admitted since the founding of the S.A.R. in 1890.

=== Membership types ===
The National SAR recognizes several membership categories defined in its national bylaws and membership policies. Regular membership is available to adult applicants who document direct lineage to a patriot of the American Revolution. Junior membership is offered to individuals under the age of 18 who meet the same lineage requirements. The Society also provides life membership for individuals who elect a one‑time dues payment in accordance with national policies. Additional categories defined in national guidance include dual membership for individuals belonging to more than one state society and associate membership for certain qualifying individuals connected to SAR activities.

==== Regular, life, dual and junior membership ====
Regular membership is available to adult applicants who document direct descent from a patriot who supported the American Revolution through military, civil, or patriotic service. Regular members pay annual dues through their chapter and state society and maintain active status by meeting national and state requirements.

Life membership is offered to individuals who elect a one‑time dues payment in accordance with national policies. Life members remain in good standing without annual National SAR dues obligations, and their status is recognized across all state societies and chapters. Some states and chapters have their own life or perpetual membership programs, such as those documented in the administrative materials of the Texas Society.

Dual membership is available to SAR members who wish to belong to more than one state society. Dual members maintain active status in each state society in which they hold membership and may participate in chapter activities, state meetings, and leadership roles across multiple jurisdictions, subject to the bylaws of each society.

Junior membership is available to individuals under the age of 18 who meet the same lineage requirements as regular members. Junior members are enrolled through a parent or guardian and may transition to regular membership upon reaching adulthood. SAR also recognizes a membership pathway for graduates of the Children of the American Revolution (C.A.R.), who may apply using previously verified lineage documentation recorded through that organization.

==== Transfers and reinstatements ====
SAR membership policies also outline procedures for transferring membership between state societies or local chapters, and reinstating former members. These processes are governed by national membership policies and are administered through state societies and chapters.

==== Supplemental applications ====
In addition to documenting a qualifying patriot ancestor for regular membership, SAR members may submit supplemental applications to record additional Revolutionary War ancestors in their lineage. State societies track supplemental activity at varying levels of detail. The Virginia Society has published statistical analyses of supplemental applications submitted by its members, based on data from the SAR Patriot Records System (PRS). According to the Virginia SAR, members of the state society have collectively submitted more than 3,000 supplemental applications, and several individuals have documented exceptionally large numbers of additional patriot ancestors, including three members with more than forty supplemental applications each.

==== Emeritus membership ====
National SAR offers emeritus member status to any compatriot who has been a paid a cumulative total of 50 years of regular membership. An emeritus member no longer pays National dues. While the 50-year requirement for emeritus status is established globally under national bylaws, individual state societies retain the authority to determine whether to waive their own state and local chapter dues for these members.

==== Memorial membership ====
Memorial membership is a special form of posthumous recognition available to deceased male ancestors who would have qualified for regular membership but did not apply during their lifetime. A memorial member is enrolled upon request of a living male descendant who provides full lineage documentation and evidence of the ancestor's eligibility for patriot service. Memorial memberships do not confer active or voting status, but the ancestor is recorded in the National SAR membership rolls and receives a commemorative certificate issued in his name. Memorial membership also establishes a verified lineage pathway that may be used by descendants in future SAR applications.

==== Ladies auxiliary ====
Although SAR membership is limited to individuals who meet lineage requirements, many state societies and chapters have affiliated Ladies Auxiliary organizations that support SAR activities. The National Ladies Auxiliary Sons of the American Revolution (NLASAR) is formally recognized by the National Society as an important partner organization. According to SAR, members of the NLASAR "are held in the highest esteem by the National Society" and have contributed significant fundraising support for SAR programs. As of 12 July 2021, NLASAR bylaws state that "Membership in the NLASAR shall be open to all women who wish to support SAR and its mission." Members of the NLASAR regularly attend Trustees Meetings and National Congresses and organize their own events in coordination with SAR activities.

=== Membership history ===
Membership by year
Year	Total Membership
Apr 1891	2,657
May 1908	11,493
Dec 1916	14,800
Dec 1917	15,700
Dec 1918	16,200
Dec 1921	27,000
Mar 1922	16,830
Mar 1923	17,703
Mar 1926	18,348
Mar 1927	19,324
Jan 1963	18,600
Jul 1986	23,185
Apr 1990	24,424
Apr 1991	24,765
Apr 1992	24,235
Apr 1993	24,112
Apr 1994	24,331
Jul 1, 1996	25,386
Jul 1, 2006	26,733
Nov 2013	32,013
Apr 2014	30,669
Aug 22, 2016	33,992
Aug 26, 2019	36,658
Aug 20, 2020	36,621
Jul 21, 2021	36,767
Aug 18, 2022	37,022
Aug 14, 2023	37,263
Aug 27, 2024	36,292
Aug 21, 2025	36,766
Aug 19, 2026	38,331

Membership in the SAR has grown steadily since the Society's founding in 1889, with totals regularly reported in early Official Bulletins, annual Proceedings, and later congressional documents. Early twentieth‑century reports show the Society expanding as state societies and local chapters were established across the country.

- In 1900, the SAR reported approximately 4,000 members nationwide, reflecting the early growth of state societies and the establishment of chapters in major cities.
- By 1908, the Society had already surpassed 11,000 members, reaching 11,493 according to the Official Bulletin, and continued to grow steadily into the 1920s as sesquicentennial commemorations and expanded public programming increased national visibility.
- Mid‑century Proceedings record continued growth, with membership exceeding 20,000 by the early 1960s as new chapters were chartered and genealogical interest increased.
- A 2006 act of Congress amending the SAR's federal charter noted that the Society had "more than 27,000 members" at the time.
- By 2026, membership reached an all‑time high of nearly 39,000 members with more than 550 chapters in the United States and abroad, a growth trend attributed in part to increased public engagement surrounding the America 250 commemorations.

These figures reflect long‑term organizational growth and the expansion of genealogical, educational, and commemorative programs across national, state, and chapter levels.

=== Inclusion initiatives ===
In the 21st century, the Sons of the American Revolution has expanded efforts to recognize and include descendants of historically underrepresented Patriot groups. Several new chapters have been chartered with predominantly African American membership descended from documented Black and free men of color Patriots. The Patriot Isaac Carter Chapter of the North Carolina Society SAR—recognized as the first SAR chapter composed primarily of descendants of a free man of color from the historic Harlowe community in Carteret and Craven counties—was established to honor Patriot Isaac Carter. In Virginia, the Abraham Brown Chapter was chartered to commemorate Abraham Brown, a free African American landowner who provided material support to the Continental Army.

The Society has also broadened recognition of Native American Patriot contributions, exemplified by the Nansemond Indian Patriots Chapter SAR, formed in partnership with the Nansemond Indian Nation. In 2022, the SAR formally recognized the Oneida Nation with its Distinguished Patriotic Leadership Award for its historic support of the American Revolution. During a ceremony in Wisconsin, SAR representatives honored the Nation's contributions as one of the few Native nations to ally with the Continental forces, providing warriors, food, and strategic assistance during the conflict. These actions form part of the SAR's broader efforts to acknowledge historically underrepresented groups whose contributions were essential to the success of the Revolution.

The SAR also recognizes women as qualifying Patriots when documented evidence shows they provided material support, civil service, or paid wartime taxes during the Revolutionary period. Genealogical research and state‑level initiatives have increasingly highlighted the contributions of women—both married and widowed—whose property, labor, or public service supported the Patriot cause. This expanded documentation has led to broader recognition of women's roles in the Revolution and increased numbers of members joining the Society through female Patriot lines.

These developments accompany wider national and state‑level initiatives to identify, verify, and commemorate Black, Indigenous, female, and other historically overlooked Patriot ancestors.

== Organization ==
The SAR is organized as a national membership society with a multi‑tiered structure consisting of the National Society, regional districts, state societies, and local chapters. Governance is exercised through elected officers, a board of trustees, and standing committees.

=== National Society ===
The National Society of the Sons of the American Revolution serves as the governing body for the organization and oversees national programs, publications, membership standards, and coordination among state societies. It is led by a President General, elected annually at the National Congress, along with a slate of national officers and an executive committee responsible for administrative and strategic functions. The National Society maintains the SAR Genealogical Research Library, the Education Center and Museum, and national headquarters operations in Louisville, Kentucky.

=== Districts ===
Districts serve as intermediate administrative groupings of state societies and provide regional coordination for SAR activities. Each district consists of several neighboring state societies and is overseen by a Vice President General elected at the National Congress.

Districts facilitate communication between the National Society and state societies, support regional events and Color Guard activities, and assist with leadership development and organizational planning.

Additional district-level coordination is provided through regional Vice Presidents General, who represent their districts and support state societies within their assigned region.

=== State societies ===
State societies constitute the primary administrative units of the SAR and exist in all fifty states. Each state society is chartered by the National Society and operates under its own bylaws while adhering to national membership standards and program guidelines. State societies coordinate statewide educational programs, historical commemorations, Color Guard activities, and youth scholarship contests. They also serve as the approving authority for membership applications before they are forwarded to the National Society for final verification.

In addition to its state-level organizations, the SAR charters several international societies that function at an equivalent administrative level. These include the France Society, Germany Society, Spain Society, United Kingdom Society, and other overseas societies that support SAR members residing abroad and promote Revolutionary-era historical education in their respective regions. International societies participate in national programs, submit delegates to the National Congress, and maintain partnerships with local historical institutions and expatriate communities.

=== Local chapters ===
Local chapters form the grassroots level of the SAR and conduct most member-facing activities, including community outreach, historical presentations, grave-marking ceremonies, and partnerships with schools and veterans' organizations. Chapters are organized geographically within each state society and are led by elected officers who manage programs, meetings, and local initiatives. Many chapters maintain relationships with local historical societies, museums, and civic groups to promote Revolutionary-era education and preservation.

=== National Congress ===
The National Congress is the annual governing assembly of the SAR and serves as the organization's highest decision-making body. Delegates from state societies convene to elect national officers, adopt resolutions, amend bylaws, and receive reports from committees and national programs. The Congress rotates among host cities across the United States and includes historical tours, commemorative events, and educational presentations related to the American Revolution. Proceedings of the Congress are published annually and serve as the official record of organizational governance.

The Sons of the American Revolution hosts two Leadership Meetings and one National Congress every year. The two leadership meetings are held in the Spring and Fall in Louisville, KY at the Brown Hotel. The National Congress is held at a different location every year during the Summer; recent locations include: Renton, Washington (2021), Savannah, Georgia (2022), Orlando, Florida (2023), Lancaster, Pennsylvania (2024), Uncasville, Connecticut (2025), and Greensboro, North Carolina (2026).

=== Committees ===
The National Society maintains a structured system of standing and special committees responsible for administering programs, overseeing governance, and supporting the organization's educational and historical mission. Committees operate under authority granted by the National Society's bylaws and report annually to the National Congress through written reports and presentations.

Standing committees oversee core organizational functions, including membership review, genealogical standards, finance, budget, communications, historical sites and celebrations, museum operations, and library development. Program-focused committees administer national youth contests, awards for public service, Color Guard coordination, veterans support initiatives, and educational outreach activities.

Special committees may be appointed by the President General to address emerging needs, long-term planning, or specific projects such as technology modernization, strategic development, or major commemorative events. Committee membership typically includes representatives from state societies, subject-matter experts, and national officers, ensuring broad participation in organizational governance and program administration.

State societies and local chapters also maintain committees as appropriate to support their own programs, events, and administrative needs, reflecting the decentralized structure of the SAR and its emphasis on local initiative within national guidelines.

=== Governance ===
The governance of the National Society of the Sons of the American Revolution is established through its Constitution and Bylaws, which define the authority of national officers, the responsibilities of committees, and the relationship between the National Society, districts, state societies, and local chapters. The National Society is led by a President General, elected annually at the National Congress, who serves as the chief executive officer and presides over meetings of the Executive Committee and the Board of Trustees.

National officers include the President General, Vice Presidents General, Secretary General, Treasurer General, Chancellor General, Genealogist General, Historian General, Librarian General, Registrar General, Surgeon General, and Chaplain General. These officers oversee administrative functions, membership verification, financial management, historical programming, and the maintenance of national facilities. Vice Presidents General represent the SAR's regional districts and serve as liaisons between the National Society and state societies.

The Board of Trustees functions as the principal governing body between sessions of the National Congress. It is composed of national officers, past Presidents General, and elected trustees from state societies, and is responsible for approving budgets, overseeing national programs, and implementing policies adopted by the Congress. The Executive Committee, a smaller body consisting of key national officers, manages day‑to‑day operations and addresses urgent matters requiring action between meetings of the Board of Trustees.

Governance at the state and chapter levels follows a parallel structure. State societies elect their own presidents and officers, maintain bylaws consistent with national standards, and oversee committees responsible for membership, programs, and historical activities. Local chapters elect officers and administer community‑level programs, educational outreach, and commemorative events. This multi‑tiered governance model allows the SAR to coordinate national initiatives while preserving local autonomy and encouraging broad participation across its membership.

=== SAR Foundation ===
The SAR Foundation is the nonprofit charitable arm of the National Society and supports the educational, historical, and preservation initiatives of the SAR. Established to provide a structured mechanism for philanthropic contributions, the Foundation manages fundraising activities, administers grants, and oversees endowments that assist national programs such as historical research, youth contests, educational outreach, and preservation of Revolutionary‑era materials.

The Foundation operates as a separate 501(c)(3) entity with its own board of trustees and financial reporting requirements, consistent with federal regulations governing charitable organizations. Funds raised by the Foundation support initiatives including the SAR Museum and Education Center, scholarly programs such as the SAR Annual Conference on the American Revolution, and grants to state societies and chapters for educational and commemorative projects.

Although closely affiliated with the National Society, the Foundation functions independently in its financial administration and governance, ensuring compliance with nonprofit standards while advancing the SAR's mission through educational and historical programming.

== Programs and activities ==
The SAR conducts a wide range of educational, commemorative, genealogical, and public‑service programs at the national, state, and chapter levels. These activities support the Society's mission to promote patriotism, preserve Revolutionary‑era history, and encourage civic engagement.

=== Youth contests and scholarships ===
The SAR sponsors several national youth contests designed to encourage the study of American history, civic responsibility, and patriotic themes. Major programs include the SAR Essay Contest (grades 9–12), the Historical Orations Contest (grades 9–12), the Video Contest (grades 6–12), the Brochure Contest (grades 6–8), the Poster Contest (grades 3–5), and the Eagle Scout Scholarship program. State societies and local chapters administer preliminary rounds, with national winners recognized at the annual National Congress. These contests form one of the Society's most visible educational outreach efforts and regularly attract participation from schools, scouting organizations, and community groups.

=== Historical commemorations ===
Historical commemorations are a central component of SAR activity. Chapters and state societies conduct ceremonies marking Revolutionary War battle anniversaries, patriot grave dedications, and historical site recognitions. Many events are held in partnership with local historical societies, museums, and government agencies. The National Society participates in major national observances, including Independence Day commemorations, Constitution Day programs, and events honoring Revolutionary War veterans and patriots.

The society is active in promoting "patriotism", and was instrumental in the establishment of Constitution Day.

Throughout the early twentieth century, the Sons of the American Revolution and its state societies participated in a variety of patriotic commemorations and memorial efforts. These activities often involved cooperation with civic institutions, state and federal agencies. Examples include:

- In 1910, the Illinois SAR petitioned Congress for funds to complete and furnish the crypt of the chapel at the U.S. Naval Academy in Annapolis as a permanent resting place for John Paul Jones.
- In 1985, the Connecticut SAR participated in the successful effort to have Nathan Hale formally designated as the official state hero of Connecticut, an action later codified by the state legislature.

==== Grave marking and commemorations ====
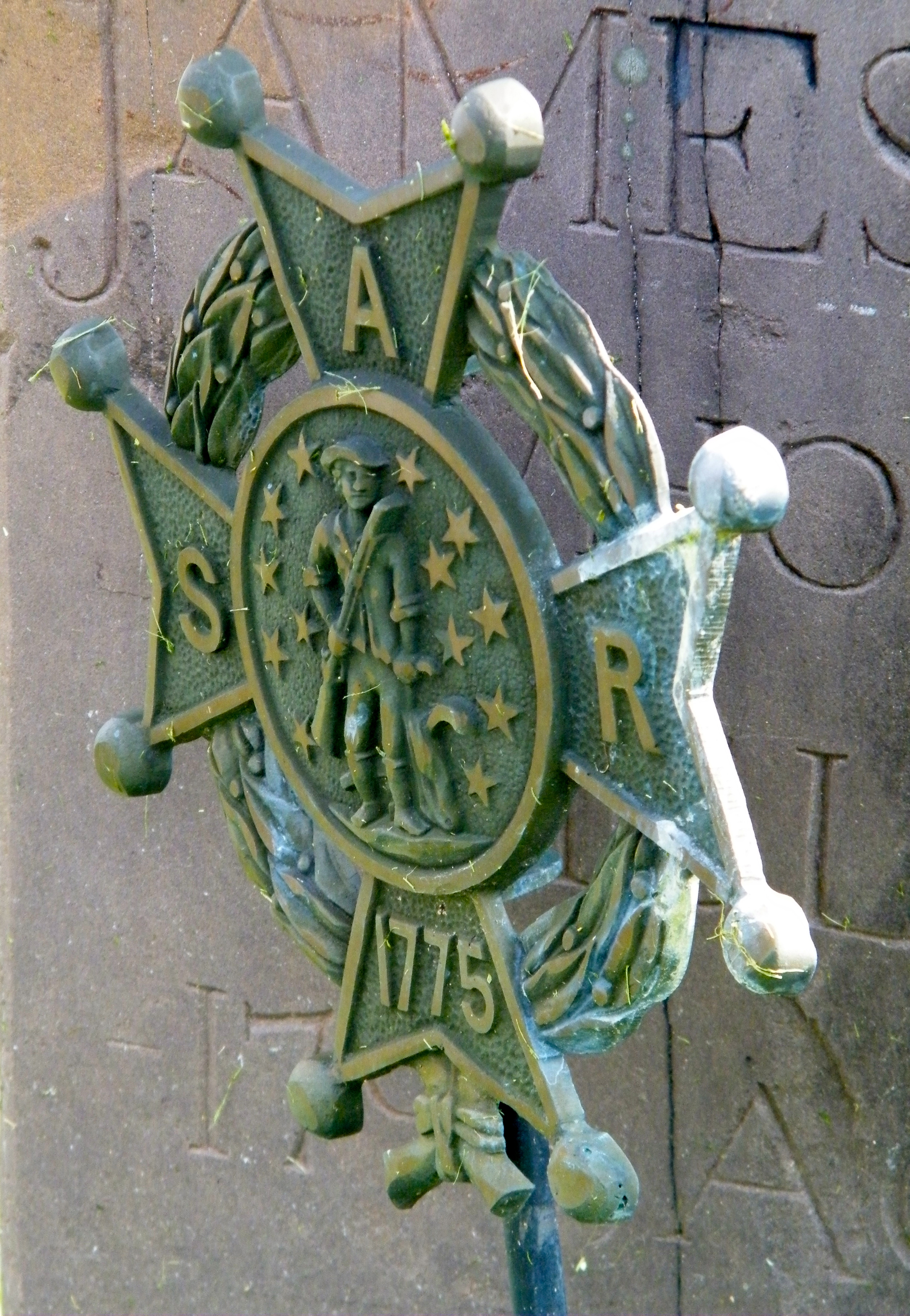
Sons of the American Revolution grave marker at the Opequon Presbyterian Church Cemetery in Opequon, Virginia.

SAR chapters regularly conduct grave‑marking ceremonies to honor Revolutionary War patriots and early SAR members. These events typically include historical presentations, color guard participation, and the placement of SAR‑authorized markers. Grave marking has been a longstanding activity of state societies and chapters, reflecting the organization's mission to preserve Revolutionary‑era memory and promote public awareness of local patriot history.

Many cemeteries impose regulations on the types of markers permitted. While traditional bronze markers on metal stakes remain authorized by the National Society, numerous municipal and perpetual‑care cemeteries require flat stone markers to avoid maintenance issues associated with upright metal objects.

SAR chapters frequently coordinate with cemetery management to ensure that marker placement complies with local rules and long‑term care policies.

==== Memorials and historical markers ====
SAR state societies and chapters also create memorials at significant Revolutionary War sites, battlefields, and historically important locations. These memorials may take the form of bronze plaques, interpretive signage, or other permanent markers installed in cooperation with local governments, park authorities, or historical organizations. Such projects highlight local Revolutionary War history and commemorate events or individuals associated with the struggle for independence. In addition to site‑specific memorials, several SAR state societies have partnered with the William G. Pomeroy Foundation to install Patriot Burials® markers. These roadside historical signs identify cemeteries containing multiple Revolutionary War patriot burials and provide public visibility for sites that may not have individual grave markers. The program expands SAR's commemorative work beyond single graves to broader burial landscapes, often involving collaboration with municipal cemetery boards and local historical groups.

In 1923, the SAR played a significant role in the early preservation of the Saratoga battlefield. According to the National Park Service, SAR members were among the first national advocates for protecting the site and helped purchase two farms that later became part of what is now Saratoga National Historical Park. The organization also sponsored commemorative events and supported federal efforts to secure and interpret the battlefield for public use.

==== National commemorations ====
For four major national anniversaries—the centennial in 1876, the sesquicentennial in 1926, the bicentennial in 1976, and the semiquincentennial in 2026—Congress created commissions to coordinate nationwide celebrations of the American Revolution and the founding of the United States. The SAR has participated in each of these commemorative periods through historical research, public ceremonies, educational programs, and collaboration with civic and patriotic organizations.

During the 1926 sesquicentennial, SAR chapters and state societies organized public commemorations, historical pageants, and patriotic observances marking the 150th anniversary of the Declaration of Independence. Contemporary newspaper coverage noted the involvement of hereditary and patriotic societies, including SAR members, in local and regional celebrations. Many events were conducted jointly with veterans' organizations and historical societies, reflecting the Society's expanding role in public historical interpretation during the early twentieth century.

The SAR played an active role in the 1976 bicentennial, supporting national and local celebrations coordinated by the American Revolution Bicentennial Administration. Chapters conducted grave‑marking programs, Color Guard appearances, and educational outreach in schools and museums. Veterans' organizations documented joint commemorations with lineage societies, including SAR participation in bicentennial ceremonies, parades, and memorial observances. Academic studies of bicentennial activities also noted the involvement of hereditary societies in public programming and historical interpretation.

For the 2026 semiquincentennial, the SAR participates in America 250, contributing historical research, genealogical documentation, and program development through state‑level and chapter‑level America 250 committees. These efforts include supporting local commemorations, assisting partner organizations, and expanding public access to Revolutionary‑era history as part of the nationwide anniversary observance

=== Color Guard ===
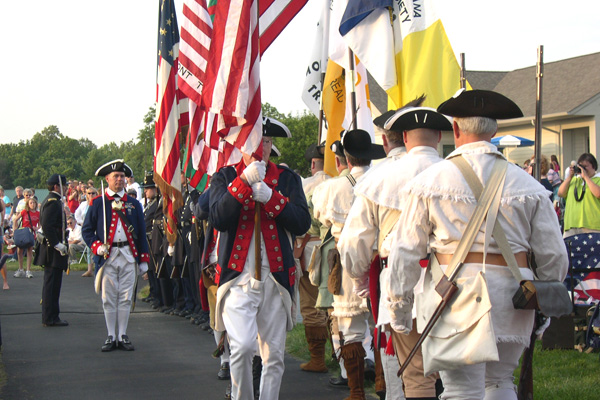
The color guard of Sons of the American Revolution's Indiana chapter alongside the recreated 19th U.S. Infantry Regiment at an outdoor Independence Day concert with the Indianapolis Symphony Orchestra in Indianapolis in 2006.

The SAR Color Guard is one of the organization's most recognizable public‑facing programs. Members appear in period attire at parades, historical ceremonies, educational events, and civic observances. Color Guard units exist at the chapter, state, district, and national levels, with the National Color Guard participating in significant national commemorations and representing the Society at major public events. The program emphasizes historical interpretation, public education, and ceremonial protocol.

=== Veterans support ===
The SAR maintains programs dedicated to supporting veterans and active‑duty military personnel. Chapters conduct outreach to veterans' homes, participate in Wreaths Across America events, color guard honors for Honor Flights, and present awards recognizing service and achievement within the armed forces and to the military veterans. The Society also administers awards for ROTC and JROTC cadets, encouraging leadership, citizenship, and academic excellence among young military students.

=== Educational outreach ===
Educational outreach is conducted through classroom presentations, teacher workshops, historical exhibits, and partnerships with schools and libraries. Many chapters provide educational materials on the American Revolution, sponsor essay and oration contests, and collaborate with educators to promote the study of early American history. The National Society's Education Center and Museum supports these efforts by offering exhibits, interpretive programs, and digital resources.

=== Genealogical and historical research ===
The SAR promotes genealogical research through its Genealogical Research Library, publications, and support for members documenting Revolutionary War ancestry. The Society collaborates with genealogical organizations, national archives, and historical institutions to preserve records and encourage scholarly study of Revolutionary‑era individuals and events. Research initiatives also support the verification of patriot service and the preservation of historical documentation. The Sons of the American Revolution petitioned Congress to store Revolutionary era documents in a fire-proof building in the Smithsonian Institution and make them available to the public.

The National Society sponsors the SAR Annual Conference on the American Revolution, an academic conference established to advance scholarly research on the Revolutionary era. Hosted by the SAR Foundation, the conference brings together historians, researchers, and educators for presentations, panel discussions, and publication‑focused collaboration on emerging scholarship related to the American Revolution. Conference proceedings and associated publications contribute to the Society's broader efforts to support historical inquiry and promote public understanding of the Revolution.

=== Partners in Patriotism ===
The SAR participates in the Partners in Patriotism program, a national initiative that encourages collaboration with other patriotic, civic, educational, and veterans' organizations. Through this program, chapters and state societies work with groups such as the Daughters of the American Revolution, the Children of the American Revolution, the American Legion, the Veterans of Foreign Wars (VFW), Wounded Warriors, Scouting America, and local historical societies to promote public understanding of the American Revolution and support community service activities.

Partners in Patriotism activities include joint commemorations, wreath‑laying ceremonies, historical presentations, youth program sponsorships, and veterans' outreach initiatives. Collaborative events often take place at historic sites, cemeteries, schools, and civic venues, reflecting the program's emphasis on public engagement and shared patriotic purpose. Many SAR chapters maintain ongoing relationships with partner organizations, coordinating annual observances such as Constitution Day, Veterans Day, Flag Day, Memorial Day, and local Revolutionary War anniversaries.

The program also supports veterans' initiatives through cooperation with organizations such as Wounded Warriors, which frequently partners with lineage and civic groups to support injured service members and promote public awareness of military sacrifice. These partnerships broaden the reach of SAR programs and strengthen connections between lineage societies, veterans' groups, and community organizations working to preserve Revolutionary‑era history and promote civic awareness.

=== Patriot Research System ===
The SAR Patriot Research System (PRS) is a centralized, publicly accessible database maintained by the National Society to document Revolutionary War patriots and the genealogical lines of SAR members. The system contains verified service records, biographical summaries, lineage information, and supporting documentation submitted through SAR membership applications and supplemental records.

The PRS serves as a research tool for historians, genealogists, educators, and prospective members seeking to identify Revolutionary War patriots and confirm lines of descent. Entries include details on military, civil, and patriotic service, along with references to archival sources, pension files, muster rolls, and state records. The system is continually expanded as new applications are approved and as historical research clarifies or updates existing patriot information.

The PRS also supports the Society's educational mission by providing curated biographies, service summaries, and historical context for thousands of patriots. Many state societies and chapters encourage members to submit expanded biographies, source citations, and historical narratives to improve the accuracy and completeness of the database.

The SAR Patriot Records System tracks lineage connections between members and Revolutionary War Patriots. As of 25 September 2026, John Hart, a New Jersey signer of the Declaration of Independence, is the most‑represented Patriot in the Society, with 127 SAR members documented as his descendants.

=== Awards and recognitions ===
The SAR administers a broad system of awards recognizing public service, historical scholarship, civic achievement, and contributions to the preservation of American history. Awards are presented to educators, public officials, law enforcement officers, firefighters, EMS personnel, veterans, and community leaders. Many awards are administered at the chapter and state levels, with national awards conferred at the National Congress. These programs support the Society's mission to promote patriotism, honor public service, and encourage historical awareness.

The SAR maintains an extensive system of internal recognitions for its own members at the chapter, state, district, and national levels. These awards acknowledge service to the Society, leadership, historical research, Color Guard participation, and contributions to organizational growth. Major awards include the Minuteman Medal, the Patriot Medal, the Distinguished Service Medal, the Meritorious Service Medal, the Roger Sherman Commendation Medal, and the Henry Knox Achievement Medal, each recognizing different levels of sustained service and achievement within the SAR.

State societies and chapters also confer their own awards, such as chapter medals of service, certificates of appreciation, and recognitions for program leadership, committee work, and community outreach. This multi‑tiered awards structure encourages participation across all levels of the organization and highlights the diverse contributions of SAR members to the Society's mission.

In addition to its internal recognitions, the SAR also presents several high‑level awards to individuals who are not members of the Society. The Gold Good Citizenship Medal is the highest award the SAR can bestow on a non‑member and recognizes exceptional public service, leadership, or civic contributions at the national level. The Distinguished Patriot Award and Distinguished Patriotic Leadership Award is presented to individuals and organizations, respectively, who have made outstanding contributions to the nation in government, military service, or public life. These external awards highlight the Society's role in honoring exemplary civic achievement beyond its own membership.

==== Gold Good Citizenship Medal ====
The SAR's second highest award, the highest being the Minuteman Medal for outstanding service to the SAR, is the Gold Good Citizenship Medal. The medal was first awarded in 1956 and is awarded to leaders in the public service, the military, philanthropy and other fields of endeavor. Membership in the SAR is not a requirement to receive the award.

===== Notable recipients of the Gold Good Citizenship Medal =====
The following is a list of notable recipients of the SAR Gold Good Citizenship Medal, organized by U.S. presidents in chronological order, followed by an alphabetical directory of all other individuals.

- President Harry S Truman
- President Ronald Reagan
- President George H.W. Bush
- President George W. Bush
- President Joseph Biden
- Senator Lamar Alexander
- Stephen Ambrose – author
- General Earl E. Anderson, USMC
- Neil Armstrong – astronaut
- James A. Baker III – Secretary of the Treasury
- Ezra Taft Benson – Mormon president and Secretary of Agriculture
- Senator Lloyd Bentsen
- British Prime Minister Tony Blair
- Lieutenant General Walter Boomer, USMC
- Tom Brokaw – Newscaster and author
- Zbigniew Brzezinski – National Security Advisor
- Senator Harry F. Byrd
- Senator Harry F. Byrd, Jr.
- King Juan Carlos I – King of Spain
- Vice President Dick Cheney
- Senator Lawton Chiles
- General Raymond G. Davis, USMC
- Walt Disney – animator and film maker
- Senator Pete Domenici
- Lieutenant General Ira C. Eaker, USAF
- Milton Eisenhower – educator
- Enes Kanter Freedom – athlete and human rights activist
- Senator Barry Goldwater
- Major General Ulysses S. Grant III, USA
- General Lewis B. Hershey, USA
- Charlton Heston – actor
- Lieutenant General Russel L. Honoré, USA
- Lee Iacocca – automotive executive
- Governor Frank Keating
- General William A. Knowlton, USA
- General Lyman L. Lemnitzer, USA – Chairman of the Joint Chiefs of Staff
- Senator John Davis Lodge
- Senator Trent Lott
- Senator Connie Mack
- Senator Joe Manchin
- John O. Marsh, Jr. – Secretary of the Army
- Senator Charles M. Mathias
- General James Mattis, USMC – Secretary of Defense
- Senator John L. McClellan
- David McCullough – historian
- Admiral Kinnaird R. McKee, USN
- Edwin Meese III – Attorney General
- King Mohammed V – King of Morocco
- Representative Sonny Montgomery
- Admiral Thomas H. Moorer, USN – Chairman of the Joint Chiefs of Staff
- Senator Sam Nunn
- Justice Sandra Day O'Connor
- General Peter Pace, USMC – Chairman of the Joint Chiefs of Staff
- Major General George S. Patton IV, USA
- H. Ross Perot – entrepreneur
- General Colin Powell, USA – Chairman of the Joint Chiefs of Staff
- Vice President Dan Quayle
- Admiral Hyman Rickover, USN
- Governor Winthrop Rockefeller
- Governor George W. Romney – automotive executive and Secretary of Housing and Urban Development
- General Carlos Romulo – President of the Philippines
- Mike Rowe – television personality
- Senator Leverett Saltonstall
- Justice Antonin Scalia
- Alan Shepard – astronaut
- General Gordon Sullivan – U.S. Army Chief of Staff
- Justice Clarence Thomas
- Senator John Tower
- Lieutenant General Arthur G. Trudeau, USA
- Lieutenant Colonel Matt Urban, USA – Medal of Honor recipient
- General James A. Van Fleet, USA
- Representative Carl Vinson
- John Wayne – actor
- Woody Williams – astronaut

== Headquarters and facilities ==
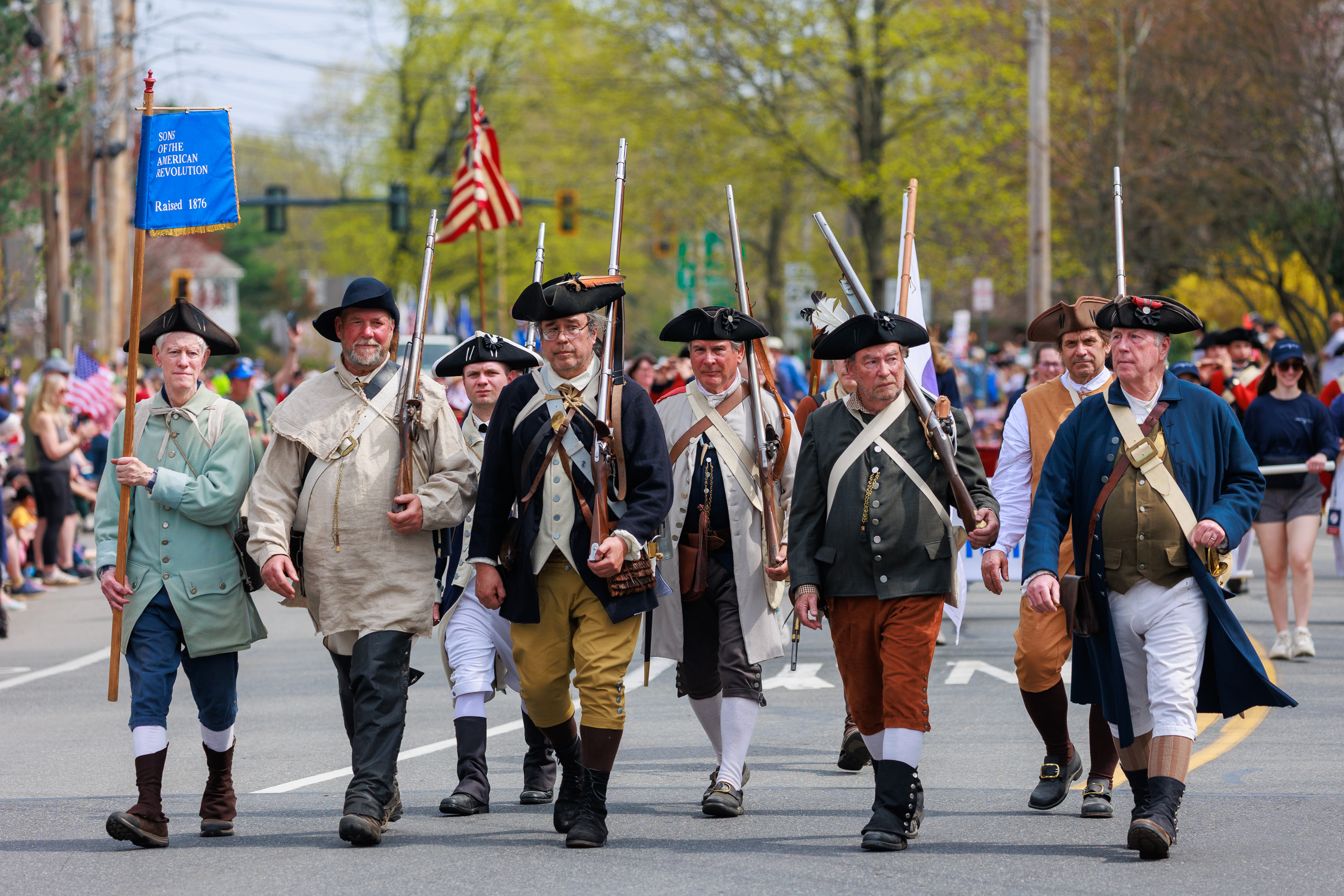
Sons of the American Revolution march in the 2025 Patriots' Day parade in Lexington, Massachusetts

The national headquarters of the National Society of the Sons of the American Revolution is located at 809 West Main Street in Louisville, Kentucky, along the city's Museum Row. The facility houses the organization's administrative offices and the SAR Genealogical Research Library, which maintains collections related to Revolutionary War genealogy and history. It is also the planned site of the SAR Education Center and Museum, an initiative intended to expand the society's educational and historical programming. The library and museum collections include original and reproduction artwork depicting Revolutionary War figures and events, as well as uniforms, flags, documents, and other colonial‑era artifacts.

Since its founding in 1889, the SAR has maintained three national headquarters. The first was established in New York City shortly after the organization's formation, where early administrative records were kept. In the early twentieth century, the headquarters moved to Washington, D.C., reflecting the society's growing national profile and its involvement in federal commemorative activities. In 1977, during an administrative transition following the resignation of Executive Director Warren S. Woodward, headquarters operations were briefly carried out in Alexandria, Virginia, before the society relocated permanently to Louisville in 1978.

The SAR relocated its headquarters to Louisville in 1978, though the present Main Street facility was acquired much later. The SAR Genealogical Research Library moved into the building in 2010, and the administrative offices followed in 2014, completing the transition to the current headquarters complex. For many years prior to the society's move into its present facility, national meetings were held at the nearby Galt House Hotel, which continues to serve as a major venue for SAR events. In addition to SAR gatherings, the Galt House has hosted significant national genealogical conferences in Louisville; most recently, the SAR served as the host society for the National Genealogical Society's annual conference held at the hotel. Louisville has long played a role in national SAR gatherings; the city hosted one of the earliest National Congresses in 1897, with sessions held at the Galt House Hotel, a venue that continues to serve as the principal site for major SAR events in the city.

Trustees meet twice annually at the Louisville headquarters during the Spring Leadership Meeting (March) and Fall Leadership Meeting (September), where committee reports and the national budget are considered. The SAR also holds an annual National Congress, typically in late June or early July, at rotating locations throughout the United States. Congress sessions include the election of national officers, consideration of constitutional amendments, and other national business.

=== Genealogical library ===
The National Society of the Sons of the American Revolution has held a collection of genealogical reference dating back to 1889. Materials were originally kept by the Secretary General or Registrar General up until 1926, when the materials were moved to the Registrar General's office in Washington, D.C., in 1927, this collection was moved to the recently purchased Sixteenth Street Headquarters Building, and the collection had grown to 914 books by 1933. From this point until the move of Headquarters from Washington, D.C., to Louisville, Kentucky, the book collection grew at a rapid pace, growing to approximately 25,000 items by 1988. At this point, the Library was on the Second floor of the Headquarters building on South Fourth Street, and possessed a 544-square-foot vault for books not out in the library due to space.

Because of continuing growth, the Sons of the American Revolution Library was moved in 2010 to a renovated building on West Main Street in the heart of the Historic Museum District of downtown Louisville. By this point, the Library collection had grown to over 58,000 items, mostly covering the Revolutionary War period, but also containing other genealogical materials. The library collection includes family histories, state genealogy materials, federal censuses, Revolutionary War pension applications, and CD collections, and the library separates materials based on State. The library also provides access to online research databases, including Ancestry.com, Fold3.com, and Heritage Quest Online.

It was supported by several other patriotic societies, including the Society of American Wars and the United States Daughters of 1812. The Daughters of the American Revolution stocked it in its library and even considered merging it with another of its own magazines. It ceased publication in 1906.

=== Education center and museum ===
The SAR maintains the SAR Genealogical Research Library and the developing SAR Education Center and Museum at its national headquarters in Louisville. The Education Center and Museum is a long‑term initiative of the SAR Foundation designed to expand public access to Revolutionary War history through curated exhibits, educational programming, and interactive installations. According to the SAR Foundation, the center will include galleries interpreting the causes, events, and legacy of the American Revolution, as well as spaces dedicated to genealogy, patriot biographies, and youth education.

The museum collection includes original and reproduction artwork, uniforms, flags, documents, and other colonial‑era items related to Revolutionary War history. These materials support the society's mission to preserve and interpret the history of the American Revolution and the patriots who fought for independence.

=== State‑level facilities ===
Most state societies of the Sons of the American Revolution do not own or operate historic properties. A notable exception is the Connecticut Society, which has maintained several Revolutionary‑era sites since the late nineteenth century. The Society has owned and operated the historic War Office in Lebanon, Connecticut, since 1891. The building served as the headquarters of the Connecticut Council of Safety during the American Revolution and is now interpreted by the Society as a museum.

In addition to the War Office, the Connecticut SAR owns and manages two historic Nathan Hale Schoolhouses—one located in East Haddam and the other in New London—both associated with the Revolutionary War service of Nathan Hale.

== Publications ==
The National Society of the Sons of the American Revolution (National SAR) maintains a continuous record of its genealogical lineages, institutional history, and regional activities through several iterations of its official national publication. What is known today as The SAR Magazine began in 1906 and has evolved through four major branding eras, supplemented by independent and local periodicals. Today, SAR Magazine remains one of the longest‑running hereditary society publications in the United States.

=== Flagship publication history ===
- Official Bulletin of the National Society of the Sons of the American Revolution (1906–1923): Launched in 1906, the Official Bulletin served as the primary record for transactions of the general officers, national trustees, and executive committees. It was responsible for tracking regional chapter activities, member obituaries, and indexing newly approved application lineages.
- The Minute Man (1923–1930): In December 1923, the national society rebranded the periodical as The Minute Man, though it retained Official Bulletin as a subtitle on its masthead. This era expanded the publication's scope to include more historical scholarship, focus on patriotic education, and coverage of national congresses.
- The Sons of the American Revolution Magazine (1930–1967): The title was simplified in 1930 to explicitly align with the corporate identity of the organization, maintaining its standard quarterly distribution format.
- The SAR Magazine (1967–present): The modern, quarterly flagship color magazine contains peer-reviewed historical features on the American Revolutionary War, updates on the SAR Patriotic Research System, state society and chapter news, and national leadership initiatives.

=== Allied and regional publications ===
- The Spirit of '76 (1894–1906): While not owned or managed as an in-house corporate publication of the SAR, this independent historical monthly magazine operated as the dominant news vehicle and public organ for the SAR, the Daughters of the American Revolution (DAR), and other hereditary organizations during their formative periods.
- State Society Bulletins: Many state-level societies publish standalone journals and newsletters to coordinate state committee and local chapter actions, such as the Virginia SAR Bulletin and the Texas Society SAR Bulletin.

Although SAR Magazine has not received trade or industry awards, it is regularly cited in library and periodical directories as a membership publication focused on historical, genealogical, and organizational content. The magazine is indexed in standard periodical reference sources and is distributed to members of the Society as part of its quarterly publication program.

== Symbols and insignia ==
The insignia of the SAR incorporates symbols associated with the American Revolution and the Society's historical identity. The official emblem consists of a Maltese cross with a central medallion depicting a Minuteman surrounded by the Society's name and founding date. This design, adopted in the late nineteenth century, reflects the influence of contemporary patriotic and hereditary organizations that employed heraldic imagery in their membership badges.

The SAR membership badge is suspended from a ribbon of blue and buff, colors historically associated with the Continental Army's uniform facings. Members may wear the badge on formal occasions, while a smaller rosette in the same colors is commonly worn on civilian attire. Officer insignia incorporate variations of the badge with additional devices or ribbon distinctions indicating national, state, district, or chapter office.

The Society also maintains an official flag featuring the SAR emblem on a field of blue and buff. The flag is used at national meetings, state society events, and public ceremonies, including Color Guard appearances and commemorative observances. Many state societies and chapters maintain their own flags or banners incorporating local heraldic elements or state symbols.

Color Guard members wear period attire representing Continental Line, militia, or other Revolutionary‑era units, often accompanied by SAR insignia on sashes, gorgets, or accoutrements. These uniforms are used for ceremonial purposes and public commemorations rather than reenactment, reflecting the Society's role in historical interpretation and patriotic observance.

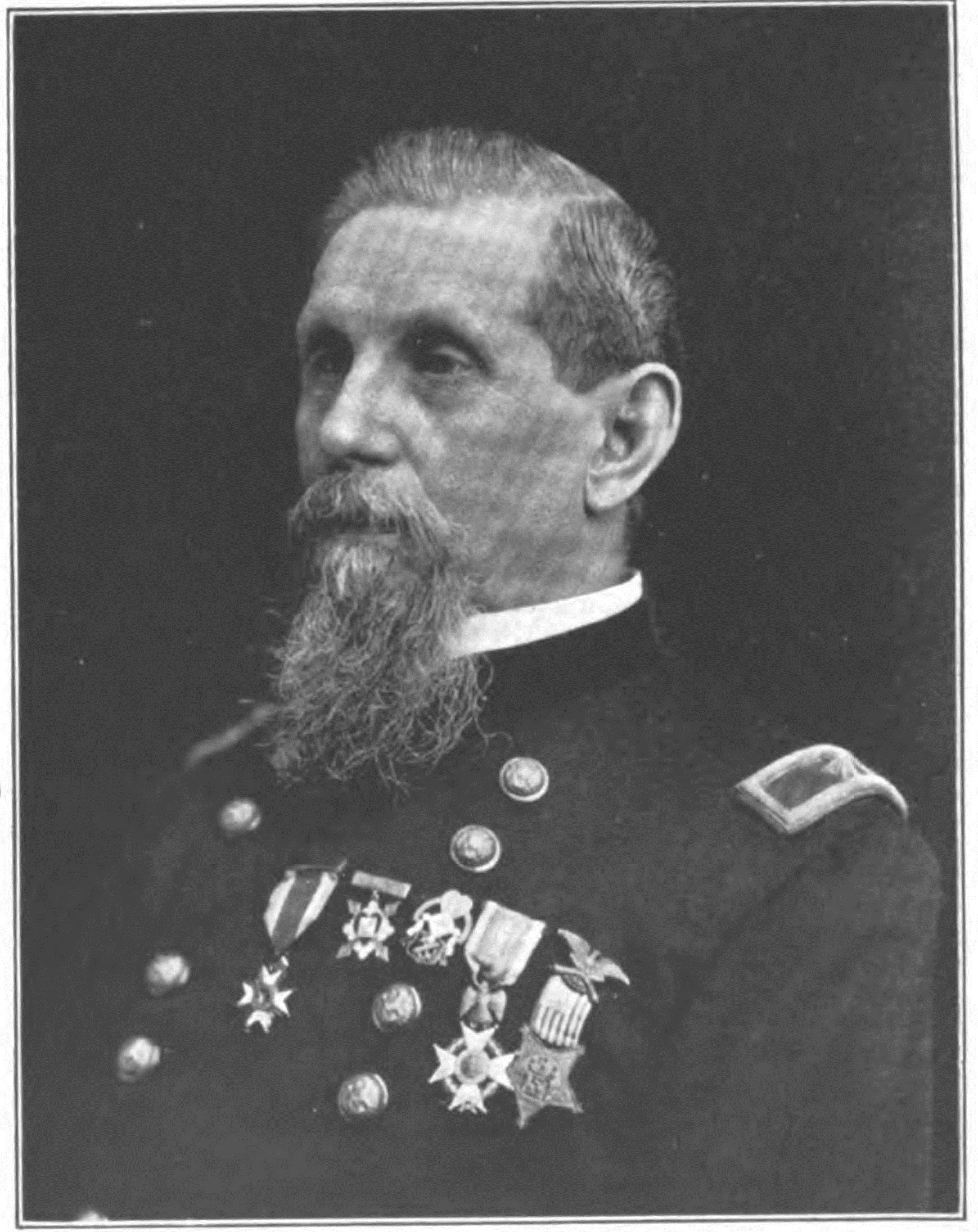
Brigadier General Edwin S. Greeley, president general from 1904 to 1905, wearing the badge of the Sons of the American Revolution. Arranged left to right across his left breast, the SAR badge occupies the fourth position.

The design of the membership badge draws inspiration from the cross of the Order of St. Louis, a French military decoration created under King Louis XVI. The SAR adopted this form in recognition of France's support for the American Revolution, particularly the military assistance provided to the Continental Army. Surrounding the central medallion are the words "Libertas et Patria," or "Liberty and Country."

The insignia is normally worn suspended by a ribbon of blue, white, and buff on the wearer's left breast. National officers and former state and chapter presidents may wear the insignia suspended from a neck ribbon in the Society's colors. The rosette is worn on the left lapel on less formal occasions.

The SAR's medal system, described in the Awards and recognitions section, follows a standardized hierarchy of gold, silver, and bronze medals corresponding to national, district, state, and chapter levels. These medals incorporate the Society's emblem and ribbon colors, maintaining consistency with the broader insignia tradition. In accordance with the Society's protocol, full‑size SAR medals are typically worn on suits or sport coats during semi‑formal or organizational events. For formal evening attire, including black‑tie occasions, members wear miniature medals mounted on a bar in place of full‑size decorations. These conventions parallel the practices of other hereditary and patriotic societies and reflect long‑standing norms for civilian wear of organizational insignia.

== Leadership ==
The national leadership of the SAR consists of elected officers, a board of trustees, and various national committees responsible for administering the Society's programs, governance, and strategic direction. Officers are elected annually at the National Congress and serve one‑year terms, with eligibility and duties defined in the SAR Constitution and Bylaws. The principal national officers include the President General, Vice Presidents General, Secretary General, Treasurer General, Chancellor General, Genealogist General, Historian General, Librarian General, Surgeon General, Chaplain General, and Registrar General.

The President General serves as the chief executive officer of the Society, presiding over the National Congress, leadership meetings, and meetings of the board of trustees. Vice Presidents General oversee the SAR's regional districts, providing coordination among state societies and representing their districts on the board. Other general officers supervise specific administrative and programmatic areas, including finance, membership, genealogy, historical interpretation, archives, and ceremonial functions.

The board of trustees, composed of national officers, Vice Presidents General, and designated representatives from state societies, manages the Society's affairs between National Congresses. It meets at the Spring and Fall Leadership Meetings in Louisville, Kentucky, where trustees review committee reports, approve budgets, and consider policy matters. Numerous standing and special committees support the work of the board by overseeing programs such as membership, youth contests, historical research, veterans' outreach, education, and national events.

State societies and local chapters maintain parallel leadership structures, with elected officers responsible for administering programs at their respective levels. State presidents coordinate activities among chapters, represent their societies at national meetings, and participate in regional district operations. Chapter presidents and officers manage local initiatives, meetings, and community outreach. This multi‑tiered leadership structure enables coordination across national, regional, state, and local levels while supporting the Society's mission to preserve and promote the history of the American Revolution.

=== List of SAR presidents general ===
All General Officers, including those elected as President General, serve without compensation in such capacities.

1. Lucius Parmenias Deming, of Connecticut, 1889†
2. William Seward Webb, of New York, 1889–1892†
3. Horace Porter, of New York, 1892–1897★†
4. Edward Shepard Barrett, of Massachusetts, 1897–1898†
5. Franklin Murphy, of New Jersey, 1898–1900†
6. Joseph Cabell Breckinridge, of Kentucky, 1900–1901†
7. Walter S. Logan, of New York, 1901–1902†
8. Edwin Warfield, of Maryland, 1902–1903🏛️†
9. Edwin S. Greeley, of Connecticut, 1903–1905†
10. James Denton Hancock, of Pennsylvania, 1904–1905†
11. Francis Henry Appleton, of Massachusetts, 1905–1906†
12. Cornelius Amory Pugsley, of New York, 1906–1907†
13. Nelson Alvin McClary, of Illinois, 1907–1908†
14. Henry Stockbridge Jr., of Maryland, 1908–1909†
15. Morris Beach Beardsley, of Connecticut, 1909–1910†
16. William Allen Marble, of New York, 1910–1911†
17. Moses Greeley Parker, of Massachusetts, 1911–1912†
18. James McElroy Richardson, of Ohio, 1912–1913†
19. Rogers Clark Ballard Thruston, of Kentucky, 1913–1915†
20. Newell Bertram Woodworth, of New York, 1915–1916†
21. Elmer Marston Wentworth, of Iowa, 1916–1918†
22. Louis Annin Ames, of New York, 1918–1919†
23. Chancellor Livingston Jenks Jr., of Illinois, 1919–1920†
24. James H. Preston, of Maryland, 1920–1921†
25. Wallace McCamant, of Oregon, 1921–1922⚖️†
26. W. I. Lincoln Adams, of New Jersey, 1922–1923†
27. Arthur Preston Sumner, of Rhode Island, 1923–1924†
28. Marvin Harrison Lewis, of Kentucky, 1924–1925†
29. Harvey Foote Remington, of New York, 1925–1926†
30. Wilbert Hamilton Barrett, of Michigan, 1926–1927†
31. Ernest E. Rogers, of Connecticut, 1927–1928†
32. Ganson Depew, of New York, 1928–1929†
33. Howard Rowley, of California, 1929–1930†
34. Josiah Alexander Van Orsdel, of Washington, D.C., 1930–1931⚖️†
35. Benjamin Newhall Johnson, of Massachusetts, 1931–1932‡
36. Frederick William Millspaugh, of Tennessee, 1932–1933†
37. Arthur Milton McGrillis, of Rhode Island, 1933–1935†
38. Henry Fennimore Baker, of Maryland, 1935–1936†
39. Messmore Kendall, of New York, 1936–1940†
40. Smith Lewis Multer, of New Jersey, 1943–1946†
41. Allen Laws Oliver, of Missouri, 1946–1947†
42. A. Herbert Foreman, of Virginia, 1947–1948†
43. Charles Bunn Shaler, of Pennsylvania, 1948‡
44. Benjamin Harrison Powell III, of Texas, 1948–1949†
45. John Whelchel Finger, of New York, 1949–1950†
46. Wallace Clare Hall, of Michigan, 1950–1952†
47. Ray Omer Edwards, of Florida, 1952–1953†
48. A. Alexander le Pelletier de la Houssaye, of Louisiana, 1953–1954†
49. Milton Miles Lory, of Iowa, 1954–1955†
50. Edgar Williamson Jr., of New Jersey, 1955–1956†
51. Eugene Pendleton Carver Jr., of Massachusetts, 1956–1957†
52. George Edward Tarbox Jr., of Colorado, 1957–1958†
53. Walter Allerton Wentworth, of New York, 1958–1959†
54. Charles Aubrey Jones, of Ohio, 1959–1960†
55. Herschel Stratton Murphy, of New Jersey, 1960–1961†
56. Horace Yeargin Kitchell, of Mississippi, 1961–1962†
57. Charles Arner Anderson, of Ohio, 1962–1963†
58. Robert Leon Sonfield, of Texas, 1963–1964†
59. Harry Thomas Burn, of Tennessee, 1964–1965†
60. Howard Emerson Coe, of Connecticut, 1965–1966†
61. Kenneth Godfrey Smith, of Pennsylvania, 1966–1967†
62. Len Young Smith, of Illinois, 1967–1968†
63. Walter Gage Sterling, of Texas, 1968–1969†
64. James Bronson Gardiner II, of New York, 1969–1970†
65. Walter Reville Martin, of Rhode Island, 1970–1971†
66. Eugene Clifford McGuire, of Ohio, 1971–1972†
67. Ryall Stapleton Morgan, of Alabama, 1972–1973†
68. Marion Howard Crawmer, of Michigan, 1973–1974†
69. M. Graham Clark, of Missouri, 1974–1975†
70. Robert Duval Savage, of Pennsylvania, 1975–1976†
71. Matthew Bacon Sellers III, of Florida, 1976–1977†
72. Wilson King Barnes Sr., of Maryland, 1977–1978†
73. Calvin Ellsworth Chunn, of California, 1978–1980†
74. Arthur Mansfield King, of Kansas, 1980–1981†
75. Richard Henry Thompson Jr., of Florida, 1981–1982†
76. Howard Laverne Hamilton, of Virginia, 1982–1983†
77. Warren Griffin Hayes Jr., of Pennsylvania, 1983–1984†
78. Carl Francis Bessent, of Maryland, 1984–1985†
79. Benjamin Hume Morris, of Kentucky, 1985–1986†
80. Clovis Hunter Brakebill, of Texas, 1986–1987†
81. Nolan Wendell Carson, of Ohio, 1987–1988†
82. Charles Francis Printz, of West Virginia, 1988–1989†
83. James Roger Westlake, of Georgia, 1989–1990†
84. James Robert Calhoun, of New Mexico, 1990–1991†
85. George Henry Brandau, of Texas, 1991–1992†
86. Paul Howard Walker, of Massachusetts, 1992–1993†
87. Robert Bell Vance Sr., of Georgia, 1993–1994†
88. Stewart Boone McCarty Jr., of Washington, D.C., 1994–1995†
89. William C. Gist Jr., of Kentucky, 1995–1996
90. Reon Glessner Hillegass Jr., of Virginia, 1996–1997†
91. Carl K. Hoffman II, of Florida, 1997–1998†
92. Russell Duff Page, of Illinois, 1998–1999†
93. Howard F. Horne Jr., of Delaware, 1999–2000†
94. Bruce Baird Butler, of Louisiana, 2000–2001‡
95. Larry D. McClanahan, of Tennessee, 2001–2002†
96. B. Rice Aston, of Texas, 2002–2003†
97. Raymond G. Musgrave, of West Virginia, 2003–2004†
98. Henry N. McCarl, of Massachusetts, 2004–2005†
99. Roland G. Downing, of Delaware, 2005–2006
100. Nathan E. White Jr., of Texas, 2006–2007
101. Bruce A. Wilcox, of Virginia, 2007–2008
102. David N. Appleby, of Missouri, 2008–2009
103. Edward F. Butler, of Texas, 2009–2010
104. J. David Sympson, of Kentucky, 2010–2011
105. Larry J. Magerkurth, of California, 2011–2012†
106. Stephen Arthur Leishman, of Delaware, 2012–2013†
107. Joseph W. Dooley, of Virginia, 2013–2014
108. Lindsay C. Brock, of Florida, 2014–2015
109. Thomas E. Lawrence, of Texas, 2015–2016
110. J. Michael Tomme Sr., of Georgia, 2016–2017
111. Larry T. Guzy, of Georgia, 2017–2018
112. Warren M. Alter, of Arizona, 2018–2019
113. John T. Manning, of New Hampshire, 2019–2021
114. Davis L. Wright, of Delaware, 2021–2022
115. C. Bruce Pickette, of Alabama, 2022–2023
116. John L. Dodd, of California, 2023–2024
117. Darryl Addington, of North Carolina, 2024–2025
118. Michael J. Elston, of Virginia, 2025–2026
119. W. Allen Greenly, of Georgia, 2026–2027

† denotes deceased ‡ denotes died in office ★ denotes Medal of Honor recipient ⚖️ denotes an Article III judge 🏛️ denotes Governor

=== Honorary presidents general ===
After the organization of the Sons of the American Revolution, Colonel Adolphus S. Hubbard the originating president of the Sons of the Revolutionary Sires since its formation in California in 1876, guided the Sires to become the California Society, Sons of the American Revolution. Thereafter, the National Society adopted at its first National Congress in Louisville on April 30, 1890, a resolution that the former President of the Society of Sons of Revolutionary Sires, be considered a past President General of the Sons of the American Revolution.

At the third National SAR Congress held April 30, 1892, the National Society adopted the same honor to the late General Albert M. Winn. At the 77th National SAR Congress, Harold Putnam, who served as Executive Secretary from 1950 to 1966, was so honored.

1. Adolphus S. Hubbard, 1890
2. Albert M. Winn, 1892 (posthumously)
3. Harold Putnam, 1967

== In popular culture ==
The Sons of the American Revolution has appeared in a variety of cultural and media contexts related to genealogy, historical memory, and the legacy of the American Revolution. The Society and its activities have been referenced in major newspapers, including The New York Times and The Washington Post, particularly in coverage of historical commemorations, Color Guard appearances, and patriotic observances.

The Sons of the American Revolution has appeared occasionally in American film and television as a cultural reference associated with lineage societies and traditional patriotic organizations. In the television drama The West Wing, the SAR is mentioned in the Season 1 episode "Let Bartlet Be Bartlet", in which Josh Lyman jokingly characterizes a political figure as belonging to the organization, using it as shorthand for conventional or old‑guard political views.

SAR members and research materials have been featured in several documentary programs on the American Revolution, including productions associated with Ken Burns, state historical societies, and public television affiliates. The Society's role in genealogical verification has also been noted in popular genealogy media, including episodes of Who Do You Think You Are? and related publications.

Themes associated with hereditary lineage societies, patriotic service, and Revolutionary‑era preservation—central to the SAR's mission—have been discussed in commentary surrounding films such as National Treasure (2004), which explore the cultural fascination with the nation's founding documents and historical artifacts.

== See also ==
- List of hereditary and lineage organizations in the United States
- List of Members of the Sons of the American Revolution
- Daughters of the American Revolution
- Children of the American Revolution
