= Moses Greeley Parker =

American physician

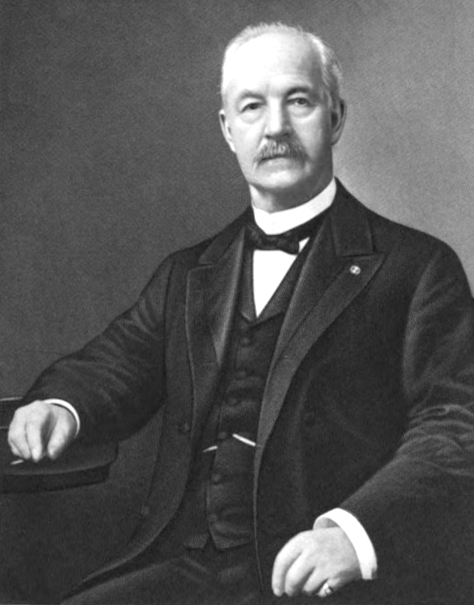
- Dr. Moses Greeley Parker
- Born: 12 October 1842; Dracut, Massachusetts, U.S.
- Died: 1 October 1917 (aged 74); Lowell, Massachusetts, U.S.
- Education: Harvard Medical School
- Occupations: Physician, author
- Scientific career
- Fields: Medicine
- Workplaces: United States Army

Moses Greeley Parker (1842–1917) was an American physician, author, and public intellectual known for his work in medicine, telecommunications, and civic leadership. He served as a surgeon during the American Civil War and later became prominent in New England for his advocacy of telephone system reforms and his philanthropic contributions. Parker also served as the President General of the National Society of the Sons of the American Revolution.

== Early life and education ==
Moses Greeley Parker was born on October 12, 1842, in Dracut, Massachusetts. He attended local schools before enrolling in Harvard Medical School, from which he graduated in 1864.

== Career ==
=== Civil War service ===
After completing medical school, Parker enlisted as a surgeon in the United States Army during the American Civil War. He served in several major military hospitals and supervised the construction and operation of a 4,000‑bed facility, one of the largest wartime hospitals of its era.

=== Medical practice and public life ===
Following the war, Parker established a medical practice in Lowell, where he became known for his public lectures and writings on contemporary social and scientific issues.

=== Telecommunications contributions ===
Parker advocated for the use of numerical identifiers rather than names for telephone exchanges—a reform later adopted by multiple telecommunications companies. His investments in the American and New England Telephone Companies contributed significantly to his personal wealth.

=== Sons of the American Revolution ===
Parker was active in hereditary and patriotic societies and was elected as the President General of the National Society of the Sons of the American Revolution. His tenure emphasized historical education and national civic engagement.

== Legacy ==
Parker's will established the Parker Lecture Series, an ongoing cultural and educational program in Lowell, Massachusetts.

The Moses Greeley Parker Memorial Library in Dracut, Massachusetts was founded in his honor and continues to serve the community.

== See also ==
- American Civil War
- Alexander Graham Bell
