= SAR Education Center and Museum =

Museum in Louisville, Kentucky

- Location in Kentucky SAR Education Center and Museum (the United States)
- Established: July 4, 2026
- Location: 809 West Main Street, Louisville, Kentucky, USA
- Coordinates: 38°15′28″N 85°45′49″W
- Type: History museum; Education center
- Key holdings: Exhibits on the American Revolution and genealogy; Articles of Association signing page
- Collections: Revolutionary War artifacts; genealogical and educational materials
- Founder: Sons of the American Revolution
- Presidents: Daniel R. McKelvie; President, SAR Foundation
- Architects: Solid Light, Inc.
- Owner: Sons of the American Revolution
- Public transit access: TARC Main @ 8th Street (Routes 4, 6, 17, 40)
- Parking: 8th & Main Parking Garage
- Website: www.sarfoundation.org/education/the-sar-museum-and-education-center/

The SAR Education Center and Museum is a planned museum at the headquarters of the National Society of the Sons of the American Revolution (SAR) in the West Main District of Louisville, Kentucky. The facility will occupy approximately 6,250 square feet (581 m^{2}) within the SAR's headquarters complex and is scheduled for full opening in 2027, with a partial opening planned for July 4, 2026.

The museum is located alongside the SAR Genealogical Research Library, which maintains one of the largest private collections of Revolutionary‑era genealogical and historical materials.

== History ==
Plans for the SAR Education Center and Museum were announced as part of a broader initiative to expand the SAR's national headquarters in advance of the United States Semiquincentennial. The project was conceived to provide public exhibits, educational programming, and interpretive galleries highlighting patriots of the American Revolution.

In 2024, the SAR detailed a $30 million expansion of its headquarters in downtown Louisville, including the museum, an educational center, interactive displays, and a theatre.

== Design and development ==
The museum is being developed as a 6,250 square feet (581 m^{2}) exhibit space within the SAR headquarters. Its design emphasizes immersive, technology‑driven interpretation of the Revolutionary era, combining traditional gallery displays with digital interactives, thematic environments, and educational programming areas. The layout includes spaces for rotating exhibits, multimedia presentations, and public events aligned with the SAR's mission of historical education and civic engagement.

Exhibit planning and media design are led by Solid Light, Inc., a Louisville‑based firm specializing in museum environments and experiential storytelling. The firm's concept integrates high‑tech installations, narrative‑driven galleries, and interactive components intended to highlight Revolutionary‑era patriots and explore the political, military, and social history of the period. Solid Light previously led the redesign of the American Civil War Museum in Richmond, Virginia, a project noted for its integration of immersive media and narrative‑driven historical interpretation.
