= Hillerich & Bradsby =

American baseball equipment manufacturer

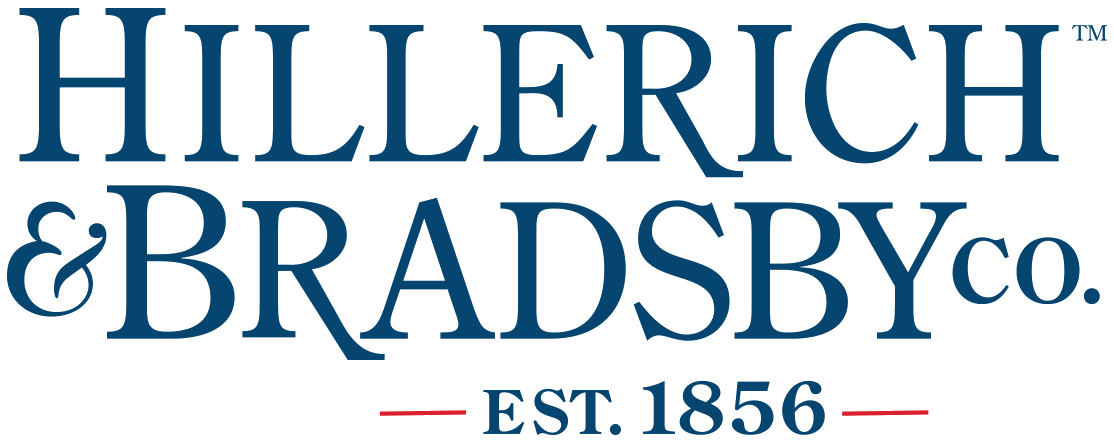
- Formerly: J.F. Hillerich & Son (1855–1916)
- Type: Private
- Industry: Sports equipment
- Founded: 1855; 171 years ago
- Founders: John A. "Bud" Hillerich; Frank Bradsby
- Headquarters: Louisville, Kentucky, United States
- Key people: John A. Hillerich IV (CEO, 2001–present)
- Products: Baseball bat, gloves
- Brands: Bionic
- Number of employees: 177 (2015)
- Divisions: Bionic Gloves
- Website: hillerichandbradsby.com

Hillerich & Bradsby Company (H&B) is an American manufacturing company located in Louisville, Kentucky, that produces baseball bats for Wilson Sporting Goods, which commercializes them under the "Louisville Slugger" brand.

The company also operates the Louisville Slugger Museum & Factory in downtown Louisville, and produces gloves for sports such as golf, cycling, fitness, and gardening under the "Bionic Gloves" brand.

Until 2015, H&B owned the "Louisville Slugger" brand. In that year they sold it to Wilson, although their factory still makes the baseball bats bearing that name.

== History ==
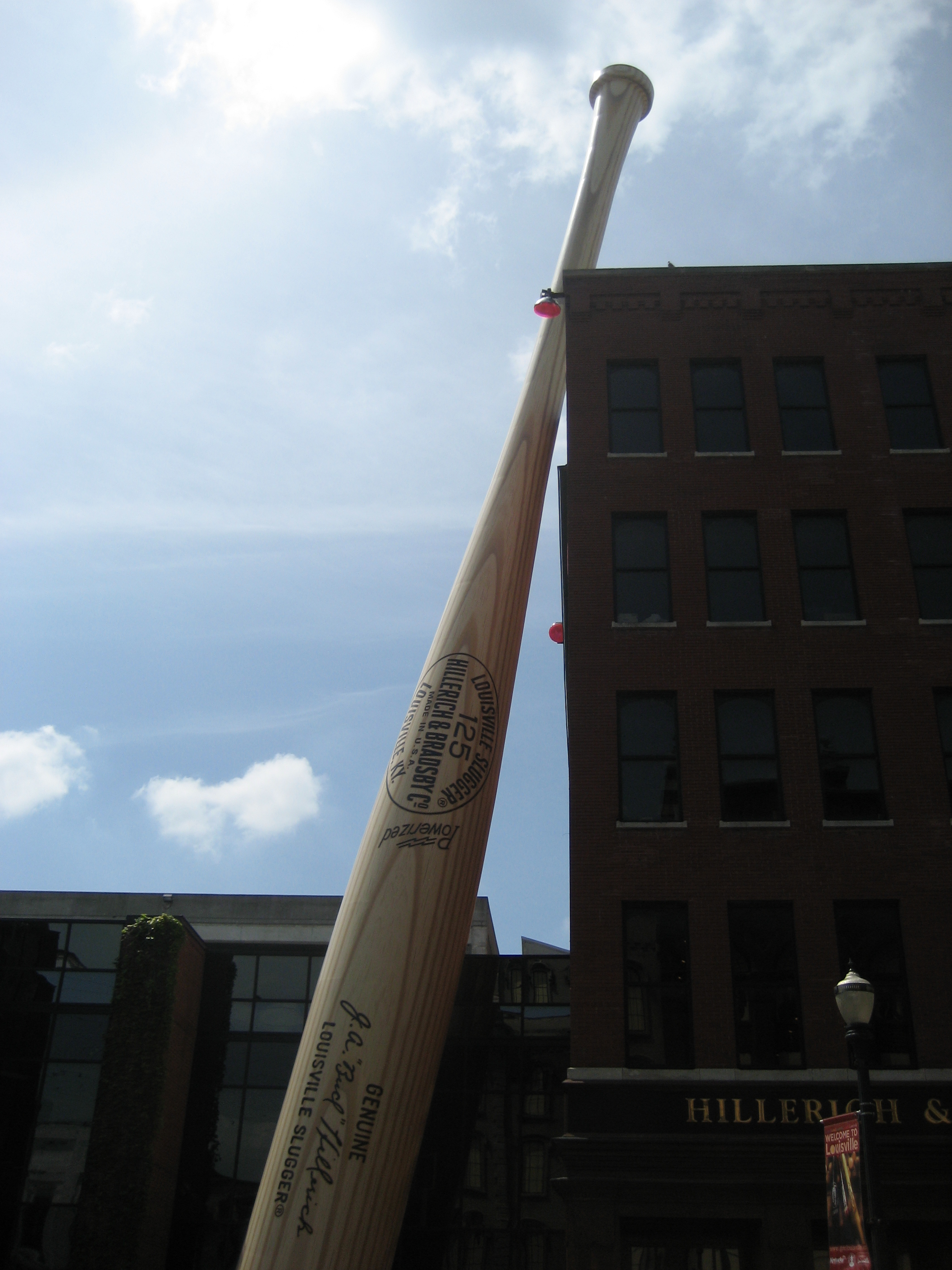
The "Largest Bat in the World" outside the Louisville Slugger Museum & Factory

J. F. Hillerich opened his woodworking shop in Louisville in 1855. During the 1880s, Hillerich hired his seventeen-year-old son, John "Bud" Hillerich.

Company legend has it that Bud, who played baseball himself, slipped away from work one afternoon in 1884 to watch Louisville's major league team, the Louisville Eclipse. The team's star, Pete "Louisville Slugger" Browning, mired in a hitting slump, broke his bat. Bud invited Browning to his father's shop to hand-craft a new bat to his specifications. Browning accepted the offer, and got three hits to break out of his slump with the new bat the first day he used it. Browning told his teammates, which began a surge of professional ball players to the Hillerich woodworking shop. This story has been challenged by alternate versions of when the first bat was made, involving either Arlie Latham or Gus Weyhing.

J. F. Hillerich was uninterested in making bats. He saw the company future in stair railings, porch columns and swinging butter churns. For a brief time in the 1880s, he turned away ball players. Bud saw the potential in producing baseball bats, and the elder Hillerich eventually relented to his son.

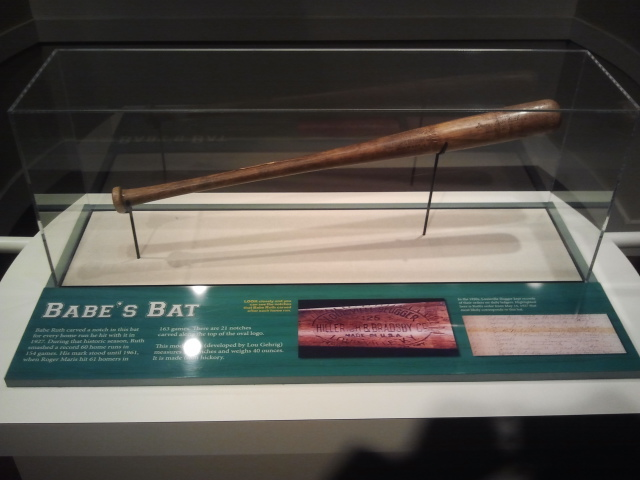
Hillerich & Bradsby bat used by Babe Ruth in a 1927 game, exhibited at the Louisville Slugger Museum & Factory

The bats were sold under the name "Falls City Slugger" until Bud Hillerich took over his father's company in 1894, and the name "Louisville Slugger" was registered with the US Patent Office. In 1905, Honus Wagner signed a deal with the company, becoming likely the first American athlete to endorse an item of sports equipment.

Frank Bradsby, a salesman, became a partner in 1916, and the company's name changed to "The Hillerich and Bradsby Co." By 1923, H&B was selling more bats than any other bat maker in the country, and legends like Ty Cobb, Babe Ruth (R-43), and Lou Gehrig were all using them. R-43 is the company model number for the bats used by Babe Ruth.

In 1916, Hillerich and Bradsby began manufacturing golf clubs, eventually creating the PowerBilt brand for the clubs. Several major golf championships were won by players using PowerBilt clubs, including the Masters Tournament in 1967, 1971, 1979, and 1987.

During World War II, the company produced wooden rifle stocks and billy clubs for the U.S. Army. In 1954, the company purchased Larimer and Norton, Inc., a Pennsylvania lumber company to ensure a supply of hardwood for their products.

In 1976, the company moved across the Ohio River, to Jeffersonville, Indiana, to take advantage of the railroad line there. In 1996, the company returned to Louisville.

=== 21st century ===
In 2005, Hillerich & Bradsby sold its majority interest in its Louisville TPS hockey equipment business. TPS Hockey was acquired three years later by Sher-Wood.

In 2015, Hillerich and Bradsby sold its Louisville Slugger division to Wilson Sporting Goods, an arm of Amer Sports which itself is an arm of the Chinese company Anta Sports. Hillerich and Bradsby continues (as of 2021) to manufacture Louisville Slugger bats in its Louisville factory, but under the aegis of Wilson Sporting Goods.

Hillerich and Bradsby CEO John A. Hillerich IV said that he had wanted to keep the bat business in the family, but that the sale was made because the company no longer can compete with larger, multinational companies that have more resources. Since 2001 Louisville slugger's market share of MLB players using their bats has been on a steady decline.

In 2016, Hillerich & Bradsby sold its PowerBilt golf club division to Hilco Streambank, an arm of Hilco Global.

This left the company with its Bionic Gloves division and its ownership and operation of the Louisville Slugger Museum & Factory. The factory continues (as of 2021) to manufacture bats, but only as the exclusive manufacturer for Wilson Sporting Goods, which sells them under the Louisville Slugger brand; the museum is open to the public and has various permanent and rotating exhibits, and provides factory tours.

In 1997, Louisville Slugger became the Official Bat of Major League Baseball (MLB). This partnership allowed the company to use the MLB trademark logo on the bats as well as bats being showcased during events like the All-Star Game, Home Run Derby, and World Series. This partnership ended in 2025 when Marucci Bats became the official bat of Major League Baseball.

== Threat to wood sources ==
Over 90% of bats ever produced by Hillerich & Bradsby have been made from Northern white ash grown in proprietary forests on the New York–Pennsylvania border. Ash trees in the US are under attack from the emerald ash borer, an invasive insect species native to Asia and first detected in Michigan in 2002. Very few ash trees remain in H&B's forests. The company is beginning to heavily utilize other woods such as maple and birch as a substantial part of North America's ash forests have been totally destroyed.

== Sponsorship ==
Besides its products, H&B attaches the Louisville Slugger name to other entities as a sponsor. The Cincinnati Reds' Triple A affiliate, the Louisville Bats, play at Louisville Slugger Field in downtown Louisville. The Louisville Slugger name is also attached to awards for top power-hitters at both the high school and college levels, and the Silver Slugger Award given annually to the Major League Baseball player with the best offensive output in each position. The Louisville Slugger Batting Champion award is given to the American Legion "player with the highest batting average during national competition."

== See also ==
- Louisville Slugger Museum & Factory

== Bibliography ==
- Hill, Bob (2000). Crack of the Bat: The Louisville Slugger Story. Sports Publishing LLC. ISBN 1-58382-012-4.
