= West Main District, Louisville =

- West Main Street Historic District
- U.S. National Register of Historic Places
- U.S. Historic district
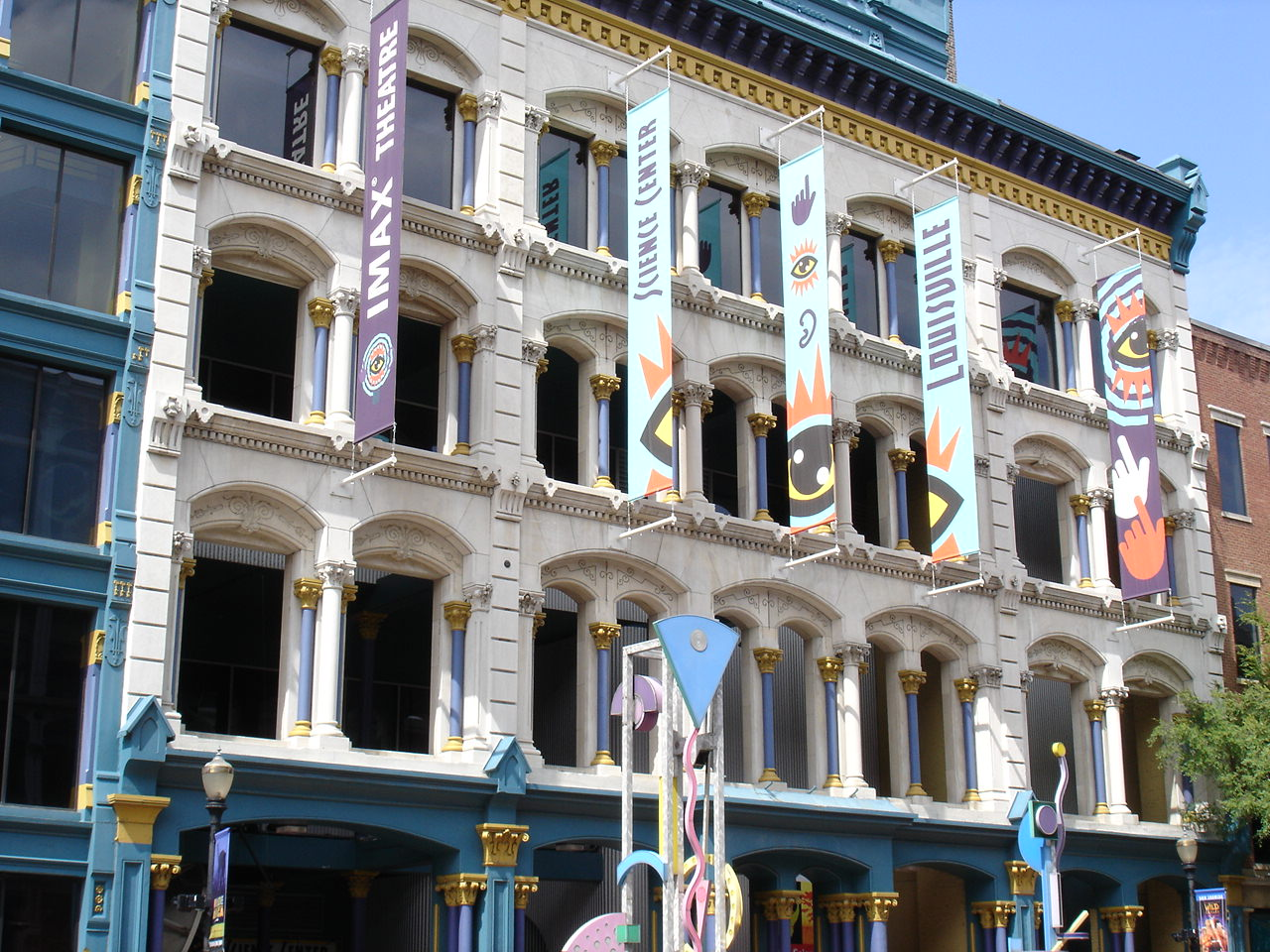
- Kentucky Science Center

- Location within Kentucky Location within the United States
- Location: Louisville, Kentucky
- Coordinates: 38.25723°N 85.7621°W
- Built: 1878
- Architect: Clarke, C.J.
- Architectural style: Late Victorian, Italian Villa
- NRHP reference No.: 74000884
- Added to NRHP: March 22, 1974

The West Main District is one of the five districts of downtown Louisville, Kentucky. The district, or a portion of it, is listed in the National Register of Historic Places as West Main Street Historic District, due to its containment of some of the oldest structures in the city. The buildings of this district boast the largest collection of cast iron façades of anywhere outside New York's SoHo district. The district also features "Museum Row", a collection of several notable museums located within just a few blocks of each other.

The district, named for its main corridor of West Main Street, includes the 800-600 blocks of Main and the southern side of the 500 block.

== Attractions ==
Many attractions are located in the West Main District.

- "Museum Row"
  - Frazier History Museum
  - National Society of the Sons of the American Revolution
    - SAR Education Center and Museum
  - Kentucky Museum of Art and Craft
  - Kentucky Science Center
  - Louisville Slugger Museum
  - Muhammad Ali Center
- Early Times Distillery
- 21c Museum Hotel
- Fort Nelson Park
- The Kentucky Center
- Riverfront Plaza/Belvedere
- Actors Theatre of Louisville
- KFC Yum! Center

== See also ==
- Cherokee Triangle, Louisville
- Cityscape of Louisville, Kentucky
- East Market District, Louisville
- Geography of Louisville, Kentucky
- Old Louisville
- Whiskey Row
