= Kentucky Science Center =

Science museum in Louisville, Kentucky

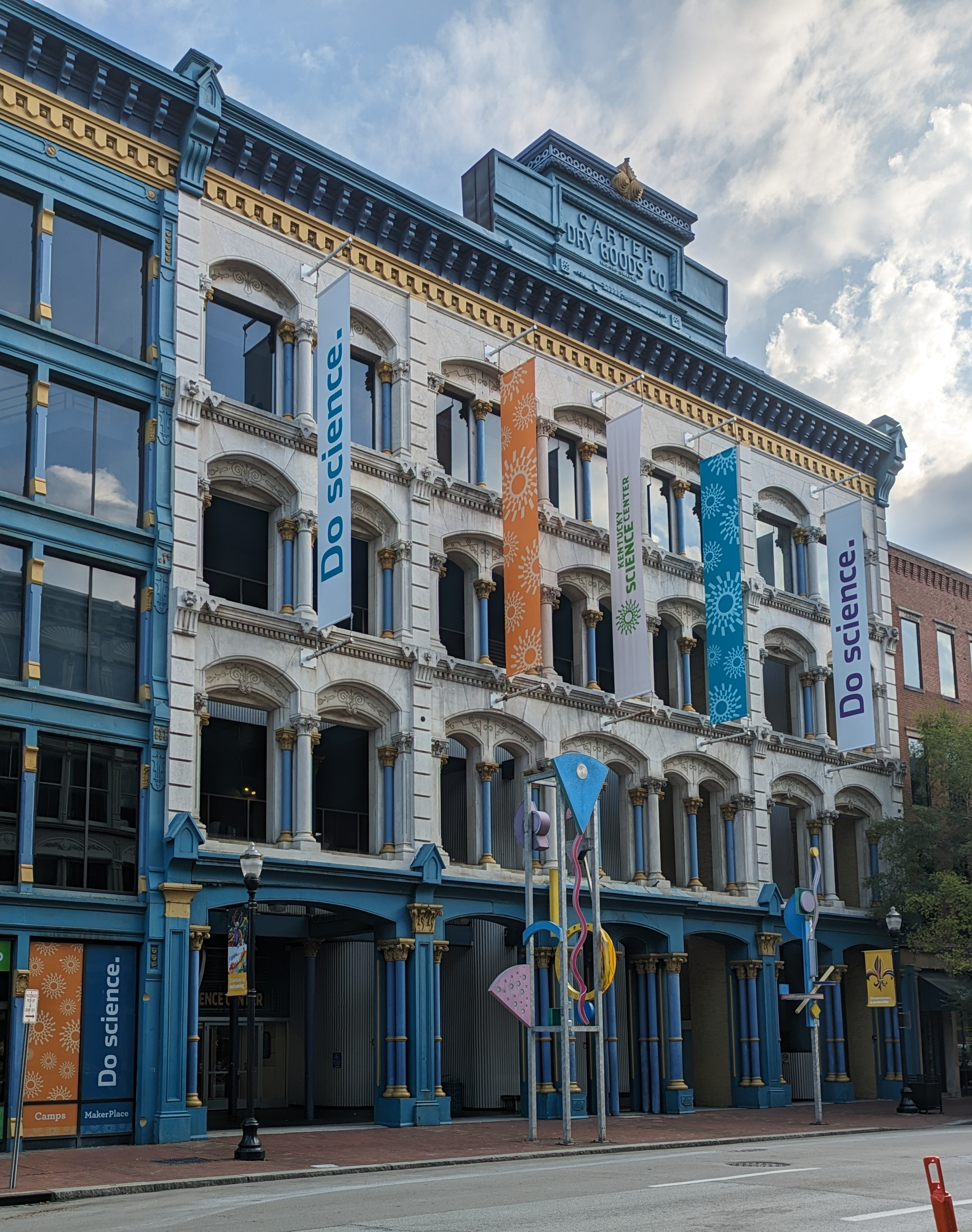
- Front facade of the Kentucky Science Center
- Former name: Louisville Museum of Natural History & Science
- Established: 1871
- Location: 727 West Main Street; Louisville, Kentucky 40202
- Coordinates: 38.257638°N 85.762687°W
- Type: Science
- CEO: Mike Norman
- Chairperson: David Tandy
- Public transit access: TARC (Route 4, 77)
- Parking: On site
- Website: kysciencecenter.org

The Kentucky Science Center, previously known as the Louisville Museum of Natural History & Science and then Louisville Science Center, is Kentucky's largest science museum. Located in Louisville, Kentucky, on "Museum Row" in the West Main District of downtown, the museum operates as a non-profit organization. It was founded in 1871 as a natural history collection. Many students in Kentucky take field trips to the Kentucky Science Center.

There are about 550,000 visitors annually. A special hands-on area for children, featuring six educational activity sections, was renovated and renamed as KidZone in 1998.

The building is located at 727 West Main Street and is about 150,000 sq ft (14,000 m^{2}). The distinctive cast-iron facade limestone building was originally built in 1878 as a dry goods warehouse. The city purchased the property in 1975, and the museum moved to the premises in 1977, subsequently winning several design awards for its preservation of the building. A four-story digital theater was added in 1988 and renovated in early 2014.

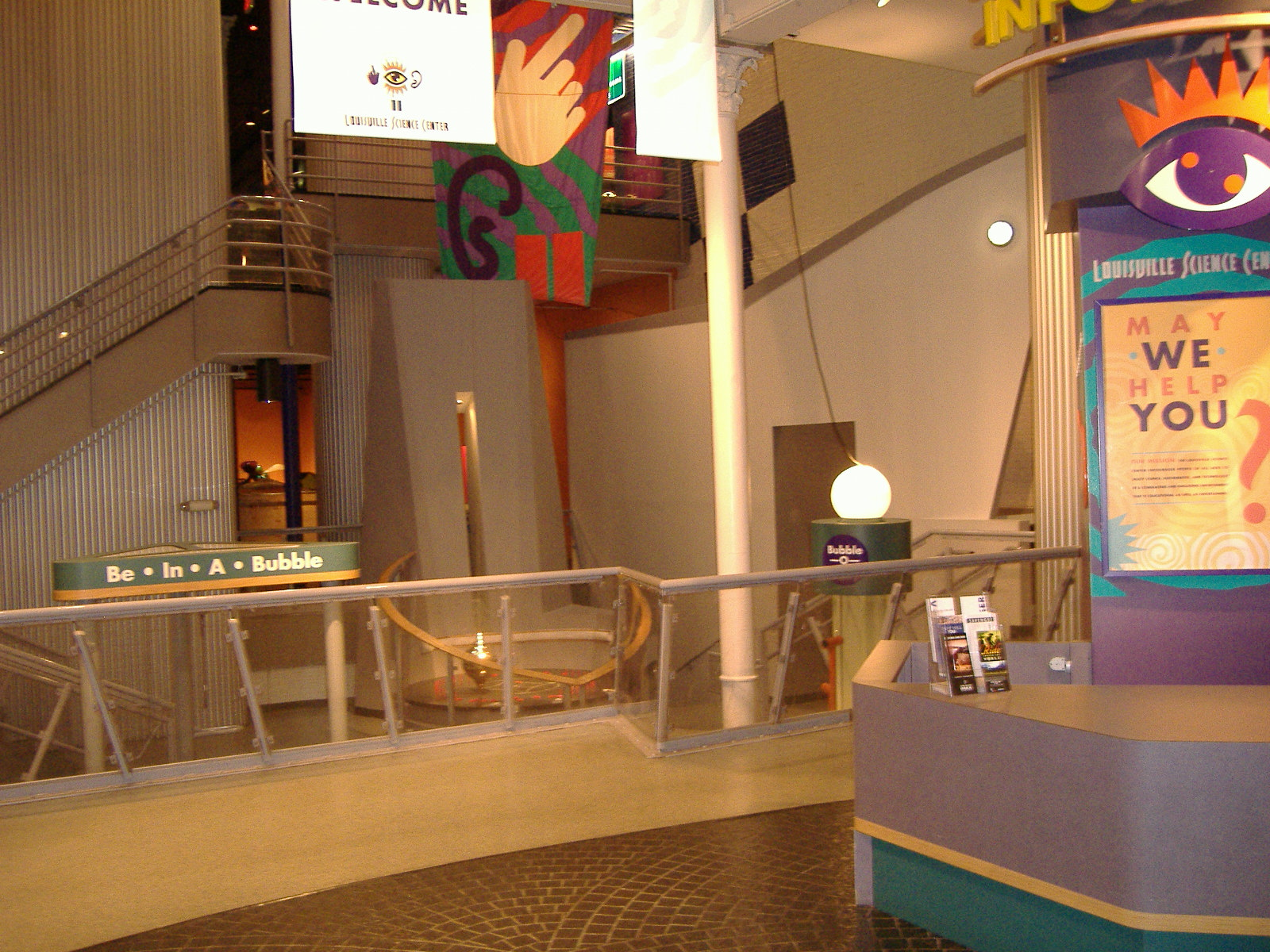
The lobby area; the pendulum has been a fixture of the building for decades

The pendulum has been a fixture of the building for decades.

On January 11, 2007, it was announced that the Kentucky Science Center would acquire the Alexander Building, which was built in 1880, adjacent to the original building.

In 2009, the center opened a Science Education Wing on the building's first floor. The wing includes four science-workshop labs equipped for "hands-on participation". The five-story Alexander Building is nearly 37,000 square feet (3,400 m^{2}).

== See also ==
- Tchaenhotep – a Third Intermediate Period mummy owned by the center
- List of attractions and events in the Louisville metropolitan area
- List of museums in the Louisville metropolitan area
