= Louisville Slugger Museum & Factory =

Attraction in Kentucky, US

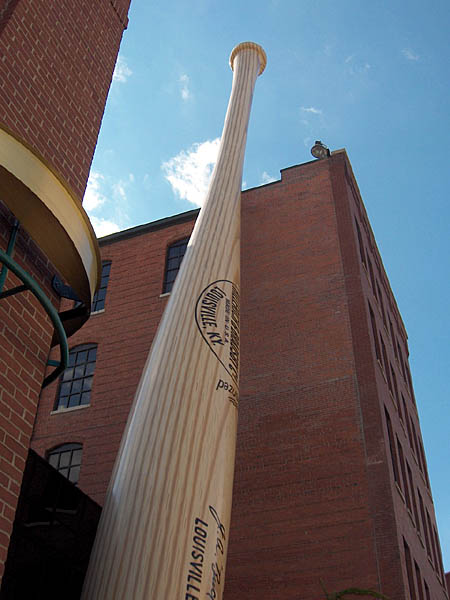
- The World's Largest Baseball Bat stands outside of the museum entrance
- Established: 1996
- Location: 800 West Main Street; Louisville, Kentucky 40202
- Coordinates: 38°15′25.7″N 85°45′48.9″W
- Visitors: 326,595 (2017)
- Website: sluggermuseum.com

The Louisville Slugger Museum & Factory, is a museum and factory tour attraction located in Louisville, Kentucky's "Museum Row", part of the West Main District of downtown. The museum showcases the story of Louisville Slugger baseball bats in baseball and in American history. The museum also creates temporary exhibits with more of a pop culture focus, including collaborations with the Norman Rockwell Museum, the Charles M. Schulz Museum and Research Center, Coca-Cola, LEGO artists Sean Kenney and Jason Burik, Topps Trading Cards, The Children's Museum of Indianapolis, and Ripley's Believe It or Not!.

The building also houses corporate offices for Hillerich & Bradsby (H&B) and its two other divisions, Bionic Gloves and PowerBilt Golf Clubs. Wilson Sporting Goods also maintains much of its Louisville Slugger sales force in the building after purchasing the brand from H&B in 2015. The Hillerich family maintains ownership of the museum and bat factory.

== History ==
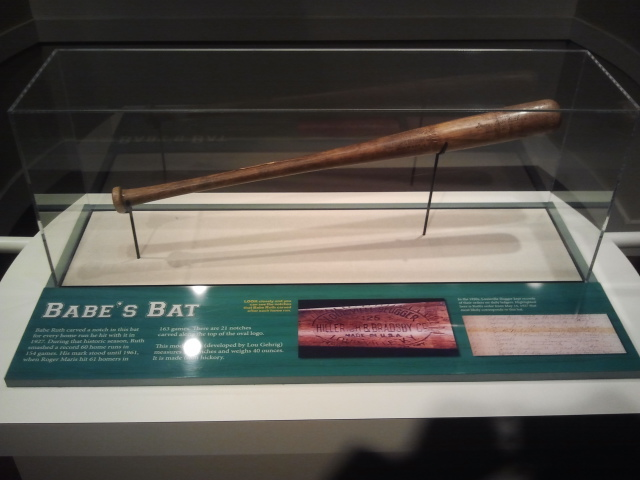
Hillerich & Bradsby bat used by Babe Ruth in a 1927 game, exhibited at the museum

The facility is the fourth location where Louisville Slugger bats have been made. The original shop was on South First Street in Louisville between Main and Market Streets. It was there that family legend suggests J. A. "Bud" Hillerich made a bat for Louisville Eclipse star Pete Browning after Browning broke his bat during a game in which Hillerich attended in July 1884. The next day, Browning got three hits with the bat and the legend was born. In 1901, the factory moved to the corner of South Preston and Finzer Streets, where they would stay until 1974. This site was vacant for many years after, but the land was donated to the city in 2015 to be developed into a community space. From 1974 to 1996, Louisville Sluggers were actually made in Jeffersonville, Indiana, just across the Ohio River at a facility called Slugger Park, while H&B maintained corporate offices on Broadway in Louisville.

Starting in the early 1990s, H&B CEO John A. "Jack" Hillerich III began looking to move production back to Louisville. Hillerich wanted to bring the factory back together with the business offices while also providing a place for the public to connect with the Louisville Slugger brand. Eventually, a site at 8th and Main Streets was chosen, the site of a former tobacco warehouse. After extensive renovations, the Museum & Factory opened in July 1996 with a gala of Hall of Fame players, including Ted Williams, Stan Musial, Ernie Banks, Harmon Killebrew and Pee Wee Reese.

The museum underwent additional major renovations in 2008, led by Formations of Portland, Oregon. In 2013, the Museum & Factory broke its own attendance record, drawing more than 303,000 visitors; this record was broken yet again in 2017, with attendance reaching 326,595. Another round of renovations, the most extensive since 2008, was completed in 2023.

The museum routinely travels around the country with a pop-up version of the experience called the Mobile Museum. These experiences often include old-time bat making demonstrations, a "Hold a Piece of History" exhibit and assorted team-specific exhibits, games and giveaways. Since 2013, the museum has visited U.S. Cellular Field, Miller Park, Busch Stadium, Progressive Field and Victory Field as well as Winter Warm-Ups for the Detroit Tigers, Cincinnati Reds, Chicago Cubs, Chicago White Sox and Cleveland Indians. A Mobile Museum was also set up at the 2015 Major League Baseball All-Star Game Fan Fest in Cincinnati, and the 2017 ACC baseball tournament Fan Fest at Louisville Slugger Field.

== Exhibits ==
=== Attractions ===
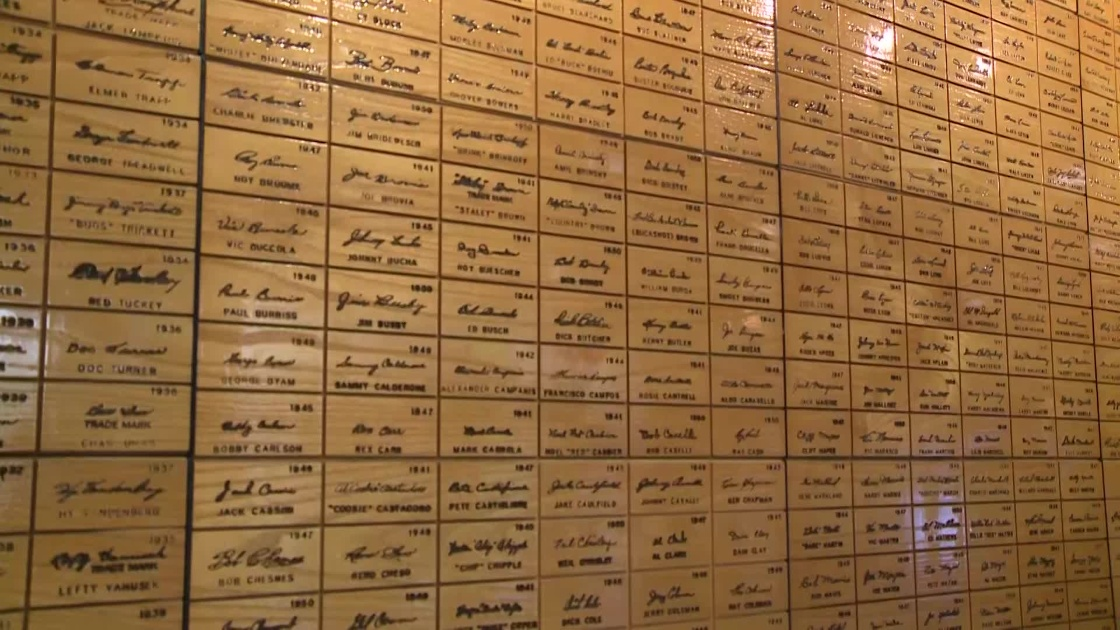
The Signature Wall at Louisville Slugger Museum & Factory. Honus Wagner was the first player to sign a promotional contract with Hillerich & Bradsby in 1905, becoming the first athlete to endorse a product in history.

- World's Largest Baseball Bat – Guinness World Records for largest baseball bat is 120 ft. tall. and weighs 68,000 pounds.
- Signature Wall – Giant wooden wall in foyer displaying signatures of every Louisville Slugger contract player.
- Museum Gallery – Variety of interpretive and interactive exhibits (see below).
- Factory Tour – Tour of the world-famous Louisville Slugger bat factory.
- Bat Vault – Guest look into room where all Louisville Slugger bat models are kept and are allowed to hold select replica models.
- Batting Cages – Guests can use historic bat models or the latest Louisville Slugger composite models to swing for the fences.
- Museum Store – Gift store featuring Louisville Slugger items, historic memorabilia from Hunt Auctions and personalized bats.

=== Museum exhibits ===
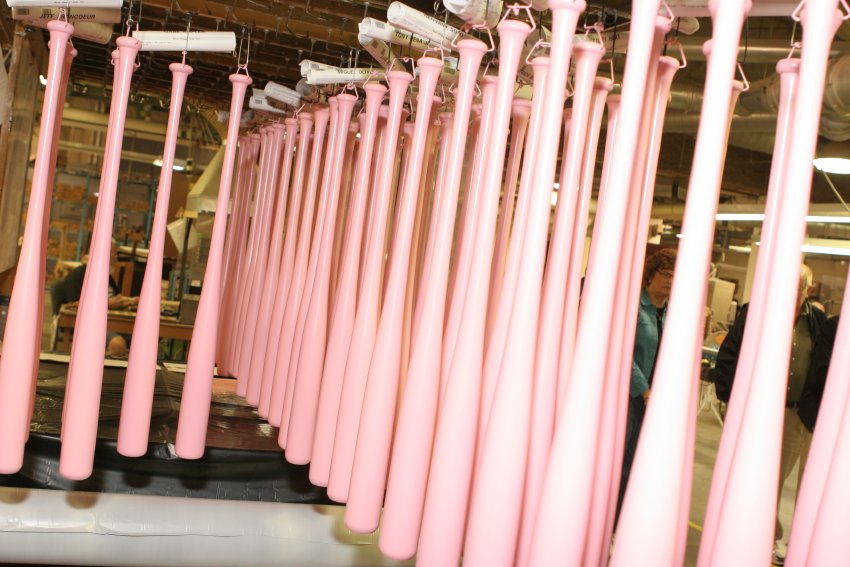
In 2006, H&B CEO John Hillerich IV visited a factory in Canada that was making pink baseball bats. He brought this idea back to the United States and quickly gained support, and Louisville Slugger has made pink bats for Mother's Day ever since.

- History of the Bat – Guests learn about the making of the first Louisville Slugger by 17-year-old Bud Hillerich for Louisville Eclipse star Pete Browning.
- Hold a Piece of History – Hold a game-used bat from Hall of Fame players, such as Babe Ruth, Johnny Bench and Ken Griffey Jr. as well as representatives of all 30 MLB teams.
- Player's Choice – Displays models of bats used by to MLB Players as well as the latest composite bats.
- Feel the Heat – Guests see what it's like to face a 90 MPH fastball.
- Old-Time Bat Making Demonstrations – See hand-turners use a lathe to demonstrate how bats used to be made.
- Burn-Brander – Docents demonstrate the process of "burn branding" bats.
- Statue collection – The museum has lifelike statues of Babe Ruth, Ted Williams, Ken Griffey Jr., Derek Jeter (2011), Jackie Robinson (2016), Roberto Clemente (2021), and Hank Aaron (2022). The statues are built by LifeFormations, a studio in Cincinnati, using a fiberglass body, steel supports, and silicone skin. On March 12, 2025, a statue of Mo'ne Davis was unveiled at the museum, which made Davis the first non-Major League Baseball player to have a statue of themselves there.

=== Factory tour ===
The tour of the Louisville Slugger bat factory consists of five stops showing how the famous bats are made. Tours typically last around 30 minutes. Though full production may not be in place on evenings, weekends and holidays, bat making still occurs on every tour and all guests receive a complimentary mini-bat at the end.

In 2015, the Louisville Slugger Museum & Factory was named the twelfth most beautiful factory in the world by CMMS Software Insight.

== Living Legend Award ==
Starting in 2007, Louisville Slugger Museum & Factory has awarded a "Living Legend" Award. The Award coincides with an annual memorabilia auction from Philadelphia-based auction house Hunt Auctions.

=== List of Living Legend Award recipients ===
- 2007 – Ken Griffey Jr.
- 2008 – Frank Robinson
- 2009 – Hank Aaron
- 2010 – Ernie Banks
- 2011 – Johnny Bench
- 2012 – Tony Gwynn
- 2013 – Cal Ripken Jr.
- 2014 – Ozzie Smith
- 2015 – Andre Dawson
- 2016 – Dave Winfield
- 2017 – Frank Thomas
- 2019 – Mike Schmidt
- 2021 – Derek Jeter
- 2022 – Jim Thome
- 2023 – Rickey Henderson

== See also ==
- History of Louisville, Kentucky
- List of attractions and events in the Louisville metropolitan area
- List of museums in the Louisville metropolitan area
