= Union army =

Land branch of the army that fought for the Union during the American Civil War

- Flag of the United States from 1863 until 1865 (35 states/stars)
- Country: United States
- Type: Army
- Size: 2,128,948 (700,000 peak)
- Part of: U.S. Department of War
- Colors: Dark Blue
- March: "Battle Hymn of the Republic"
- Engagements: See battles American Indian Wars American Civil War: Fort Sumter; First Bull Run; Wilson's Creek; Forts Henry and Donelson; Shenandoah; South Mills; Richmond; Harpers Ferry; Munfordville; Shepherdstown; Chambersburg Raid; Mississippi River; Peninsula; Shiloh; Jackson's Valley Campaign; Second Bull Run; South Mountain; Antietam; Hartsville; Fredericksburg; Stones River; Chancellorsville; Gettysburg; Champion Hill; Vicksburg siege; Corydon; Chickamauga; Chattanooga; Wilderness; Atlanta; Spotsylvania; Sabine Pass; New Hope Church; Pickett's Mill; Cold Harbor; Plymouth; Fort Pillow; Petersburg siege; Kennesaw Mountain; Jonesborough; Franklin; Nashville; Appomattox Court House

Commanders
- Commander-in-Chief: President Abraham Lincoln (1861–1865); President Andrew Johnson (1865)
- Commanding General: MG Winfield Scott (1841–1861); MG George B. McClellan (1861–1862); MG Henry W. Halleck (1862–1864); GA Ulysses S. Grant (1864–1869)

During the American Civil War, the United States Army, the land force that fought to preserve the collective Union of the states, was often referred to as the Union army, Federal army, or Northern army. It proved essential to the restoration and preservation of the United States as a working, viable republic.

The Union army was made up of the permanent regular army of the United States, but further fortified, augmented, and strengthened by the many temporary units of dedicated volunteers, as well as including those who were drafted in to service as conscripts. To this end, the Union army fought and ultimately triumphed over the efforts of the Confederate States Army.

Over the course of the war, 2,128,948 men enlisted in the Union army, including 178,895, or about 8.4% being colored troops; 25% of the white men who served were immigrants, and a further 18% were second-generation Americans. 596,670 Union soldiers were killed, wounded or went missing during the war. The initial call-up in 1861 was for just three months, after which many of these men chose to reenlist for an additional three years.

== Formation ==
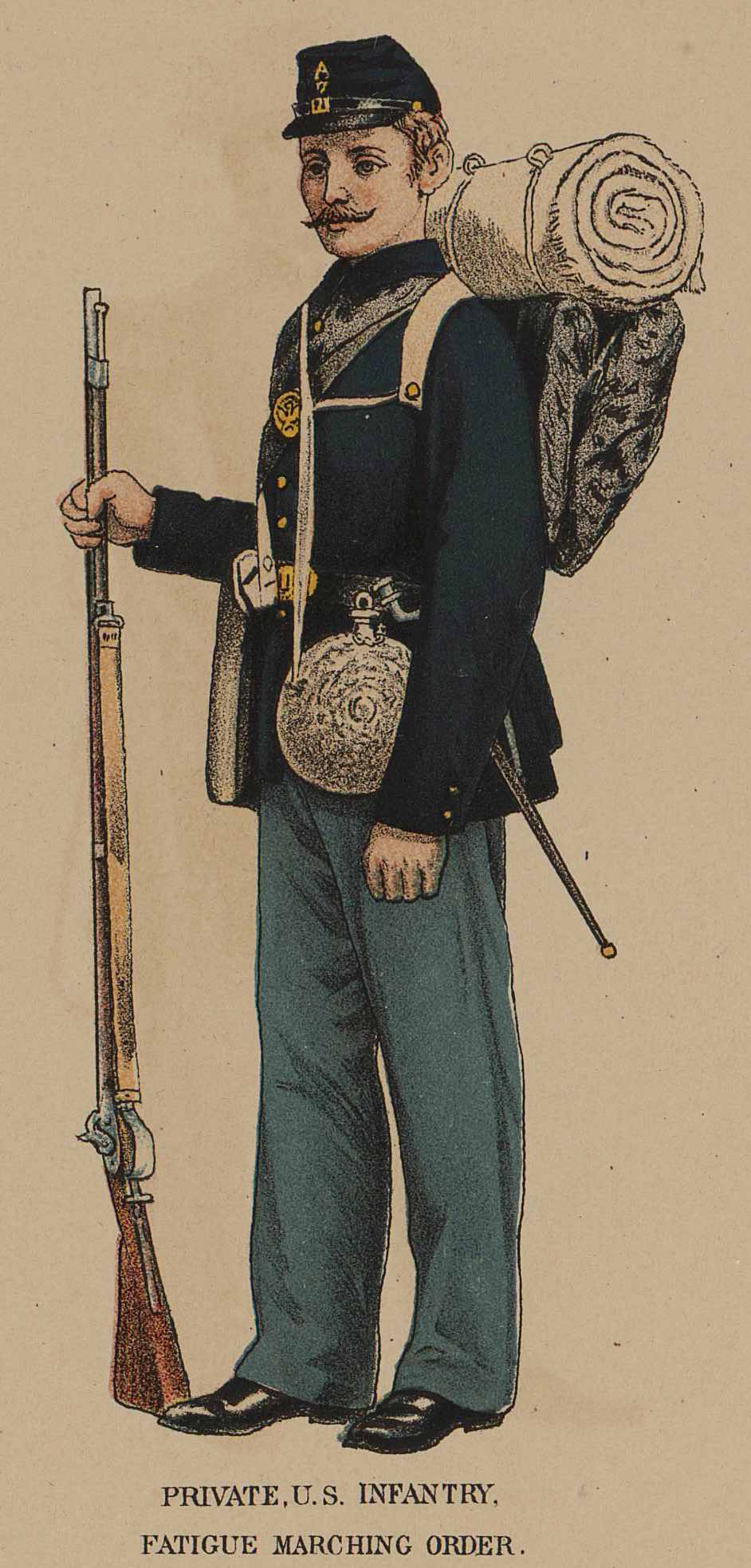
An illustration of a Union army private infantry uniform

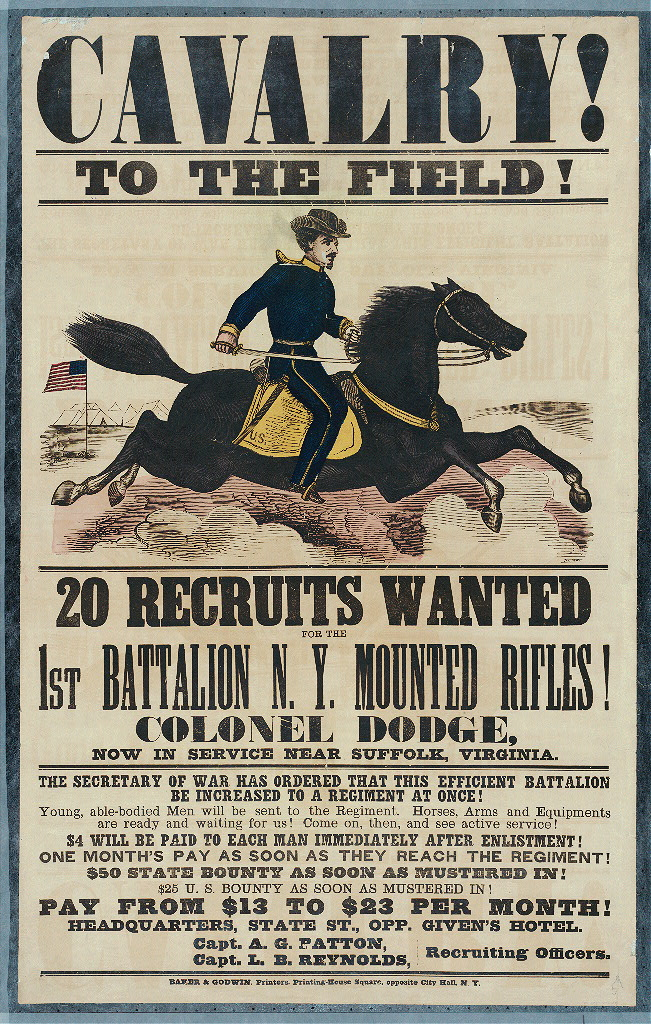
Recruiting poster for the 1st New York Mounted Rifles Regiment

When the American Civil War began in April 1861, the U.S. Army included ten regiments of infantry, four of artillery, two of cavalry, two of dragoons, and one of mounted rifles. The regiments were scattered widely. Of the 197 companies in the U.S. Army, 179 occupied 79 isolated posts in the West, and the remaining 18 manned garrisons east of the Mississippi River, mostly along the Canada–United States border and on the U.S. East Coast. There were only 16,367 servicemen in the U.S. Army, including 1,108 commissioned officers. Approximately 20% of these officers, most of them Southerners, resigned, choosing to tie their lives and fortunes to the Confederate army.

Almost 200 United States Military Academy graduates who previously left the U.S. Army, including Ulysses S. Grant, William Tecumseh Sherman, and Braxton Bragg, returned to service at the outbreak of the Civil War. This group's loyalties were far more evenly divided. Clayton R. Newell (2014) states, 92 wore Confederate gray and 102 put on the blue of the United States Army. Hattaway and Jones (1983), John and David Eicher (2001), and Jennifer M. Murray (2012), state that 99 joined the Confederate army and 114 returned to the Union forces.

With the Southern slave states declaring secession from the United States, and with a shortage of soldiers in the army, President Abraham Lincoln called on the states to raise a force of 75,000 troops for three months to put down the Confederate insurrection and defend the national capital in Washington, D.C.

Lincoln's call forced the border states to choose sides, and four seceded, making the Confederacy eleven states strong. It turned out that the war itself proved to be much longer and far more extensive in scope and scale than anyone on either side, Union North or Confederate South, expected or even imagined at the outset on the date of July 22, 1861. That was the day that Congress initially approved and authorized subsidy to allow and support a volunteer army of up to 500,000 troops to the cause.

The call for volunteers initially was easily met by patriotic Northerners, abolitionists, and even immigrants who enlisted for a steady income and meals. Over 10,000 German Americans in New York and Pennsylvania immediately responded to Lincoln's call, along with Northern French Americans, who were also quick to volunteer. As more men were needed, however, the number of volunteers fell and both money bounties and forced conscription had to be turned to. Many Southern Unionists would also fight for the Union army. An estimated 100,000 white soldiers from states within the Confederacy served in Union army units. Between April 1861 and April 1865, at least 2,128,948 men served in the United States Army, of whom the majority were volunteers.

It is a misconception that the South held an advantage because of the large percentage of professional officers who resigned to join the Confederate army. At the start of the war, there were 824 graduates of the U.S. Military Academy on the active list; of these, 296 resigned or were dismissed, and 184 of those became Confederate officers. Of the approximately 900 West Point graduates who were then civilians, 400 returned to the U.S. Army and 99 to the Confederacy. The ratio of U.S. Army to Confederate professional officers was 642 to 283. One of the resigning officers was Robert E. Lee, who had been offered the assignment as commander of a field army to suppress the rebellion. Lee initially disapproved of secession, but refused to bear arms against his native state, Virginia, and resigned to accept the position as commander of the Virginian Confederate forces. Lee eventually became the overall commander of the Confederate army.

The Confederacy had the advantage of having several military colleges, including The Citadel and Virginia Military Institute, but they produced fewer officers. Though officers were able to resign, enlisted soldiers did not have this right. As they usually had to either desert or wait until their enlistment term was over in order to join the Confederate States Army; though few are believed to have done so, their total number is unknown.

== Organization ==
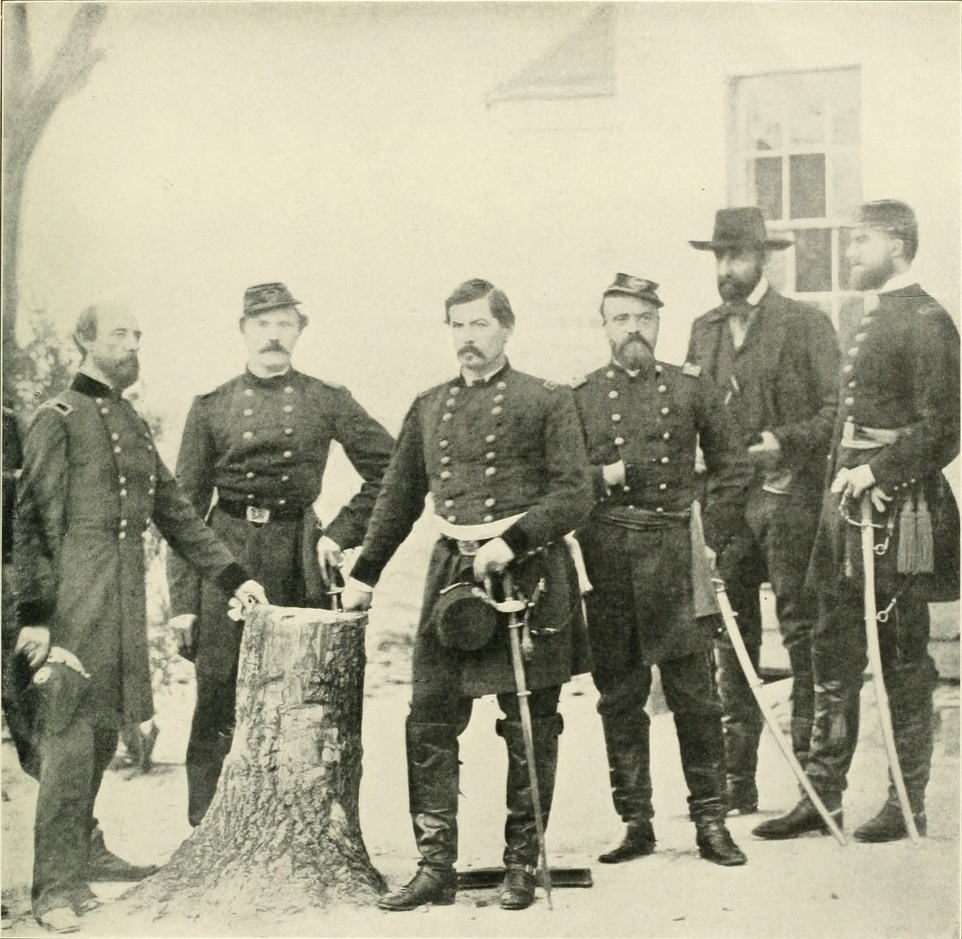
General George B. McClellan with staff and dignitaries, including from left to right: Gen. George W. Morell, Lt. Col. A.V. Colburn, Gen. McClellan, Lt. Col. N.B. Sweitzer, the Prince de Joinville (son of King Louis Philippe of France), and the prince's nephew, the Comte de Paris (on far right)

=== Leadership ===
U.S. President Abraham Lincoln exercised supreme command and control over the army in his capacity as commander-in-chief of the United States Armed Forces. Below him was the Secretary of War, who oversaw the administration of the army, and the general-in-chief, who directed the field operations of the army.

At the start of the war, Simon Cameron served as Secretary of War before being replaced in January 1862 by Edwin Stanton. The role of general-in-chief was filled by several men during the course of the war:

- Winfield Scott: July 5, 1841 – November 1, 1861
- George B. McClellan: November 1, 1861 – March 11, 1862
- Henry W. Halleck: July 23, 1862 – March 9, 1864
- Ulysses S. Grant: March 9, 1864 – March 4, 1869

The gap from March 11 to July 23, 1862, was filled with direct control of the army by President Lincoln and Secretary Stanton, with the help of an unofficial "War Board" that was established on March 17, 1862. The board consisted of Ethan A. Hitchcock, the chairman, with Department of War bureau chiefs Lorenzo Thomas (Adjutant General), Montgomery C. Meigs (Quartermaster General), Joseph G. Totten (Chief of Engineers), James W. Ripley (Chief of Ordnance), and Joseph P. Taylor (Commissary General).

Reporting directly to the Secretary of War were the bureau chiefs or heads of staff departments which made up the Department of War. These included, at the onset of the war, the adjutant general, inspector general, paymaster-general, judge advocate general, chief of engineers, chief of topographical engineers, quartermaster general, commissary general of subsistence, chief of ordnance, and surgeon general.

After the war started, the position of Provost Marshal General was also created. Originally established on September 24, 1862, as an office in the Adjutant General's department under Simeon Draper, it was made an independent department in its own right on May 1, 1863, under James B. Fry. The Signal Corps was created and deployed for the first time, through the leadership of Albert J. Myer.

One drawback to this system was that the authority and responsibilities of the Secretary of War, his Assistant Secretaries, and the General-in-Chief were not clearly delineated. Additionally, the efforts of the four "supply" departments (Quartermaster, Subsistence, Ordnance & Medical) were not coordinated with each other, a condition that would last throughout the war. Although the "War Board" could provide military advice and help coordinate military policy, it was not until the appointment of Ulysses Grant as General-in-Chief was there more than the vaguest coordination of military strategy and logistics.

=== Major organizations ===
The Union army was composed of numerous organizations, which were generally organized geographically.

Military division
A collection of Departments reporting to one commander (e.g., Military Division of the Mississippi, Middle Military Division, Military Division of the James). Military Divisions were similar to the more modern term Theater; and were modeled close to, though not synonymous with, the existing theaters of war.
Department
An organization that covered a defined region, including responsibilities for the Federal installations therein and for the field armies within their borders. Those named for states usually referred to Southern states that had been occupied. It was more common to name departments for rivers (such as Department of the Tennessee, Department of the Cumberland) or regions (Department of the Pacific, Department of New England, Department of the East, Department of the West, Middle Department).
District
A territorial subdivision of a Department (e.g., District of Cairo, District of East Tennessee). There were also Subdistricts for smaller regions.
Army
The fighting force that was usually, but not always, assigned to a District or Department but could operate over wider areas. An army could contain between one and eight corps, with an average of three. Some of the most prominent armies were:
- Army of the Cumberland, the army operating primarily in Tennessee, and later Georgia, commanded by William S. Rosecrans and George Henry Thomas.
- Army of Georgia, operated in the March to the Sea and the Carolinas commanded by Henry W. Slocum.
- Army of the Gulf, the army operating in the region bordering the Gulf of Mexico, commanded by Benjamin Butler, Nathaniel P. Banks, and Edward Canby.
- Army of the James, the army operating on the Virginia Peninsula, 1864–65, commanded by Benjamin Butler and Edward Ord.
- Army of the Mississippi, a briefly existing army operating on the Mississippi River, in two incarnations—under John Pope and William S. Rosecrans in 1862; under John A. McClernand in 1863.
- Army of the Ohio, the army operating primarily in Kentucky and later Tennessee and Georgia, commanded by Don Carlos Buell, Ambrose E. Burnside, John G. Foster, and John M. Schofield.
- Army of the Potomac, the principal army in the Eastern Theater, commanded by George B. McClellan, Ambrose E. Burnside, Joseph Hooker, and George G. Meade.
- Army of the Shenandoah, the army operating in the Shenandoah Valley, under David Hunter, Philip Sheridan, and Horatio G. Wright.
- Army of the Tennessee, the most famous army in the Western Theater, operating through Kentucky, Tennessee, Mississippi, Georgia, and the Carolinas; commanded by Ulysses S. Grant, William T. Sherman, James B. McPherson, and Oliver O. Howard.
- Army of Virginia, the army assembled under John Pope for the Northern Virginia Campaign.

Each of these armies was usually commanded by a major general. Typically, the Department or District commander also had field command of the army of the same name, but some conflicts within the ranks occurred when this was not true, particularly when an army crossed a geographic boundary.

The commanding officer of an army was authorized a number of aides-de-camp as their personal staff and a general staff. The general staff included representatives of the other combat arms, such as a chief of artillery and chief of cavalry (the infantry being typically represented by the commanding officer) and representatives of the staff bureaus and offices. The staff department officers typically assigned to an army or military department included an assistant adjutant general, a chief quartermaster, a chief commissary of subsistence, an assistant inspector general, an ordnance officer (all with the rank of colonel) and a medical director. The actual number of personnel assigned to an army's headquarters could be quite large: at Gettysburg the headquarters of General Meade (excluding engineers, the artillery reserve and the headquarters of each corps) was no less than 3,486 strong.

=== Tactical organizations ===
The military organization of the United States Army was based on the traditions developed in Europe, with the regiment being the basis of recruitment, training and maneuvering. However, for a variety of reasons there could be vast differences in the number of actual soldiers organized even into units of the same type. Changes in how units were structured during the course of the war, contrasts in organizational principals between regular and volunteer units, and even simple misnaming all played a role. Thus for example, comparing two infantry regiments at their full authorized strength one might have twice as many soldiers as the other. Furthermore, even when units were of equivalent size, their actual effectiveness depended greatly on training, leadership, equipment and other factors.

Union army tactical organizations
Name	Commander	Sub-units	Soldiers	Notes
Corps	Major general	2–6 divisions	36,000	Averaged three divisions, included a dedicated artillery brigade after 1863. See also Cavalry Corps.
Division	Major general	2–6 brigades	12,000	Averaged three brigades for infantry divisions, two brigades for cavalry. Also included attached artillery batteries until 1863.
Brigade	Brigadier general	2–12 regiments	4,000	Averaged four regiments for both infantry and cavalry. Artillery brigades consisted of between four and six batteries.
Regiment	Colonel	10 companies	1,000	Actual size would vary as attrition reduced the regiment down to several hundred soldiers or fewer. Artillery regiments consisted of twelve batteries but were purely administrative units.
Battalion	Major	Varied	Varied	With some exceptions, a battalion may refer to any two or more companies of a regiment or if a regiment consisted of between four and eight companies total.
Company	Captain	2 platoons	100	Cavalry equivalent referred to as a troop. Artillery equivalent referred to as battery, contain between four and six artillery pieces. Each platoon was further divided into 2 sections, each under a Lieutenant
Platoon	Lieutenant	2 sections	50	The platoon and section were temporary organizations, created by dividing the company when needed. The first platoon and first sections were always formed with an even number of files.

== Personnel ==
=== Regulars vs. volunteers ===
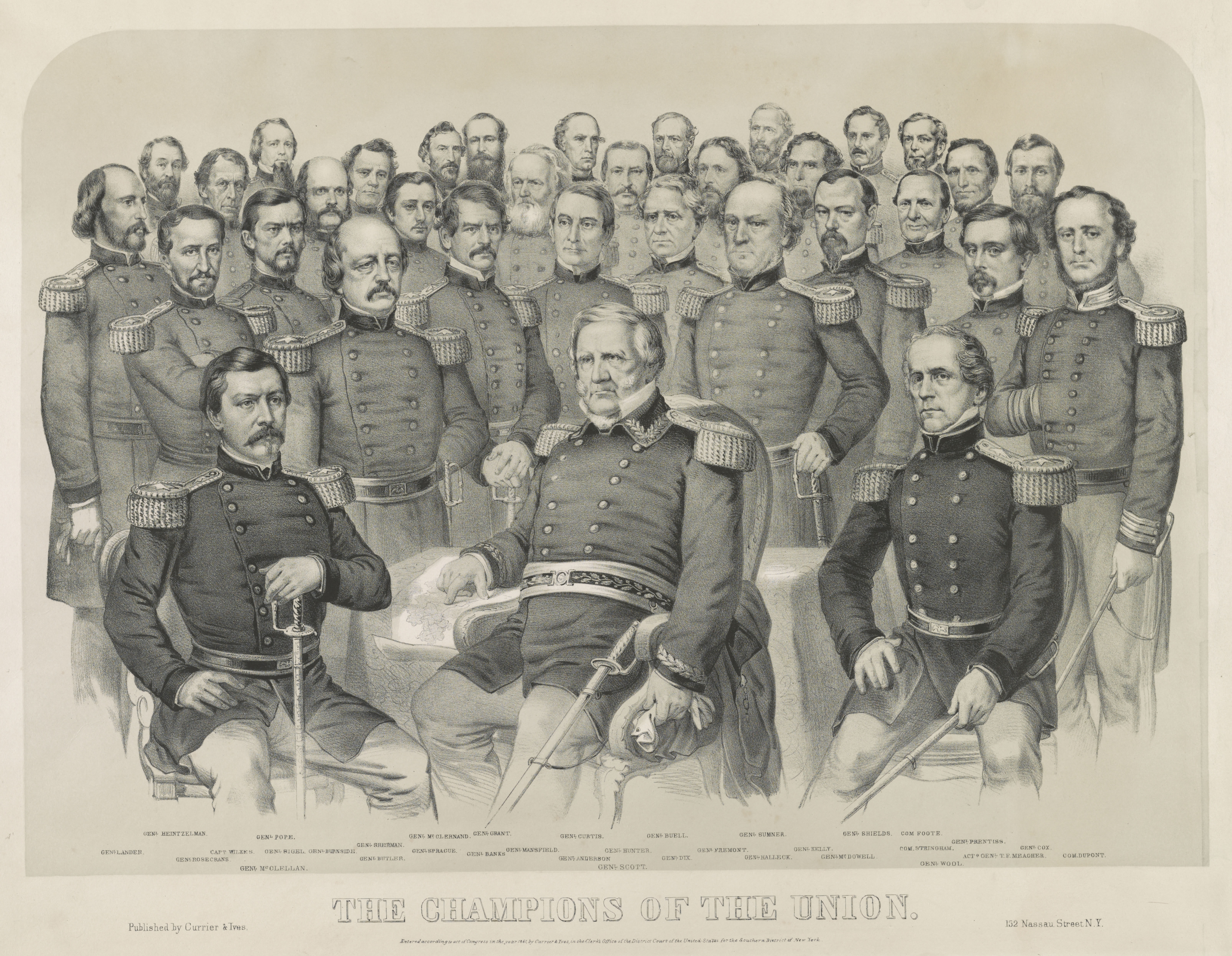
The champions of the Union, an 1861 lithograph by Currier and Ives

During the course of the Civil War, the vast majority of soldiers fighting to preserve the Union were in the volunteer units. The pre-war regular army numbered approximately 16,400 soldiers, but by the end while the Union army had grown to over a million soldiers, the number of regular personnel was still approximately 21,699, of whom several were serving with volunteer forces. Only 62,000 commissions and enlistments in total were issued for the regular army during the war as most new personnel preferred volunteer service. Due to their pre-war experience, they were considered by many as elite troops and during battles were often kept in reserve in case of emergencies.

Since before the Civil War, the American public had a generally negative view of the nation's armed forces, attributable to a Jeffersonian ideal which saw standing armies as a threat to democracy and instead valorized the "citizen soldier" as being more in keeping with American ideals of equality and rugged individualism. This attitude remained unchanged during the Civil War, and afterwards many would attribute the Union's victory to the volunteers rather than the leadership and staff work provided by the regular army. In return, officers of the regular army despised the militia and saw them as having dubious value. Commentators such as Emory Upton would later argue that the reliance on militia for the nation's defense was responsible for prolonging conflicts and making them more expensive in both money and lives spent.

Despite these attitudes towards the regulars, they would serve as an important foundation around which the Union army was built. In the disastrous First Battle of Bull Run, it was the regulars who acted as rearguard during the retreat while the volunteers fled, and when George McClellan was put in charge of what became the Army of the Potomac he used regular officers and non-commissioned officers to train the volunteers. Training the volunteers, especially in regards to critical administrative and logistical matters, remained an important function of the regulars during the war. This was particularly the case with regular army artillery, as they were more widely dispersed than the infantry and cavalry (making them more visible to the volunteers) and were assigned to specific units to train their volunteer counterparts.

In battle, the regulars' performance could impress even the most battle-hardened volunteers. At The Wheatfield during the Battle of Gettysburg, the regulars' fighting skill and orderly retirement under fire drew the admiration of many observers, including Prince Philippe, Count of Paris. As one volunteer put it, "For two years the U.S. Regulars taught us how to be soldiers [;] in the Wheatfield at Gettysburg, they taught us how to die like soldiers." The regulars became the standard by which the Volunteers were measured, and to be described as being as good or better than them was considered the highest compliment.

=== Officers ===
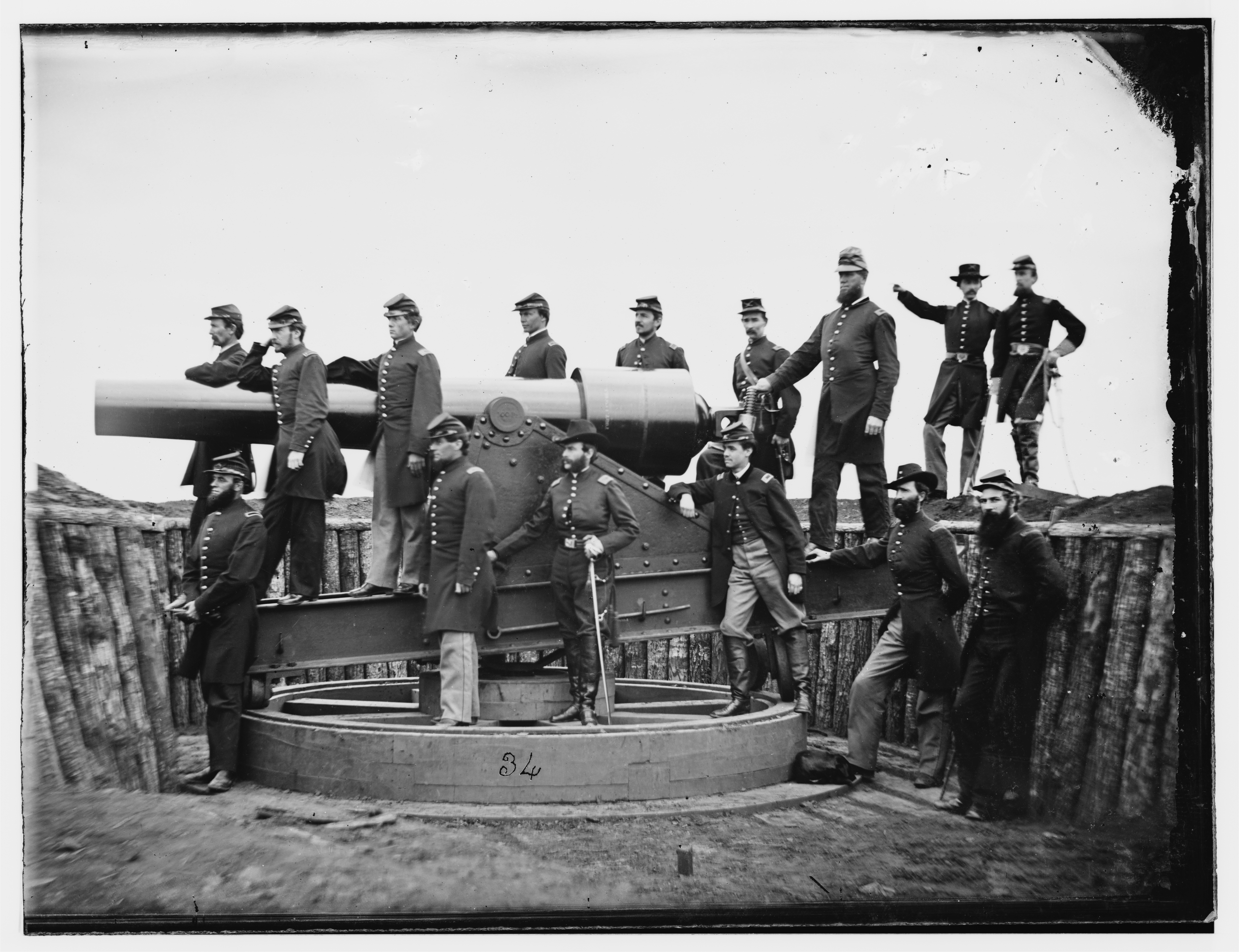
Officers of the 3rd Massachusetts Heavy Artillery Regiment defending the national capital of Washington, D.C., in 1865, the final year of the Civil War

Commissioned officers in the Union army could be divided in several categories: general officers, including lieutenant general, which was added on March 2, 1864, major generals and brigadier generals; field officers including colonels, lieutenant colonels and majors; and company officers including captains, first lieutenants and second lieutenants. There was further differentiation between line officers, who were members of the artillery, cavalry or infantry branches, and staff officers, who were part of the various departments and bureaus of the War Department. All line officers outranked staff officers except in cases pertaining to their staff assignment, in which they received their orders from their respective department chiefs. Regular general officers outranked volunteer general officers of the same grade regardless of their date of commission, a feature which could have become a subject of contention. The use of brevet ranks was also a common feature of the Union army.

Officer appointments depended on the commission grade and whether it was in the regular or volunteer forces. The President reserved the right to issue commission for all regular officers and for general officers in the volunteer forces. Volunteer field and company-grade officers could be commissioned by either the president or their respective governor. Company officers were also unique in that they were usually elected by members of their company. The political appointment and/or election of volunteer officers was part of a long-standing militia tradition and of a political patronage system common in the United States. While many of these officers were West Point graduates or had prior military experience, others had none, nor was military leadership a primary consideration in such appointments. Such a policy inevitably resulted in the promotion of inept officers over more able commanders. As the war dragged on and casualties mounted, governors reacted to their constituents' complaints and instead began to issue commissions on the basis of battlefield rather than political competence.

Officers tended to suffer a higher percentage of battle wounds on account of either the necessity of leading their units into combat and their conspicuousness when accompanied by staff and escorts.

Among memorable field leaders of the army were Nathaniel Lyon (first Union general to be killed in battle during the war), William Rosecrans, George Henry Thomas, William Tecumseh Sherman, Phil Sheridan, and Benjamin F. Butler.

Officer ranks

Rank group	General / flag officers			Senior officers			Junior officers
1861–1864
1861–1864	Major general Commanding the Army	Major general	Brigadier general	Colonel	Lieutenant colonel	Major	Captain	First lieutenant	Second lieutenant
1864–1866
1864–1866	Lieutenant general	Major general	Brigadier general	Colonel	Lieutenant colonel	Major	Captain	First lieutenant	Second lieutenant

- Lieutenant general: The rank of lieutenant general did not exist in the Union army for most of the war until February 1864, when an Act of Congress allowed for its creation. A single lieutenant general was authorized to serve as the commander of all the field armies and geographic departments of the United States, under the direction and at the pleasure of the President. By law, they were allowed two secretaries and four aides-de-camp with the rank of lieutenant colonel, and a chief of staff with the rank of brigadier general.
- Major general: Major generals were nominally the commanding officer of a division, although given the lack of higher grades of general officers they were also given command of army corps, field armies and geographic departments. In the event two or more officers of the same grade were present in the same army or department, command was decided by seniority. In an exception to this practice, the president was authorized by law to appoint a junior officer to command over his seniors. A major general was allowed a personal staff of three aides-de-camp. These were personally chosen by the general from among the captains and lieutenants of the army and would accompany him whenever his command changed, being separate from the general staff of the unit he commanded.
- Brigadier general: A brigadier general was typically in command of a brigade, but like major generals it was not uncommon for them to command larger units. They were responsible for the organization and administration of their command, particularly when operating independently. As with major generals they were also allowed a personal staff of two aides-de-camp of lieutenant grade.
- Colonel: A colonel was the commanding officer of a regiment, though they might also be assigned the commanding officer of larger units or expeditions. They oversaw the recruitment, organization and training of their regiment; conducted parades, reviews and inspections; and managed the administration of the unit, ensuring that soldiers were clothed, fed, armed and paid.
- Lieutenant colonel: A lieutenant colonel was the senior assistant to their regiment's colonel in carrying out his duties and taking command in his absence. When the regiment was split among several posts, the lieutenant colonel would command a detachment of four companies. Of those duties specific to a lieutenant colonel were taking care of the personal property of deceased officers; act as officer of the day for a brigade; and conduct regimental courts martial.
- Major: A major acted as an assistant to their regiment's colonel in carrying out his duties and commanded detachments of two or more companies. The specific duties of a major were also the same as a lieutenant colonel.
- Captain: A captain was the commanding officer of a company and saw to its administration. This included selecting (with the colonel's approval) and training non-commissioned officers, issuing punishments and conducting courts martial, and maintaining company records and books such as inventories and the muster roll. They also served as the officer of the day at a regimental camp or small post.
- Lieutenant: In the US Army there were three grades of lieutenant – first, second and brevet second. The last grade, limited to one per company, was given to West Point graduates and others worthy of the promotion but for whom there was no vacancy. Regardless of grade, lieutenants acted as assistants to the captain, and in his absence the senior-most lieutenant took command. Among their various duties they might be assigned to take the daily roll-call, conduct inspections of the troops, and assist with recordkeeping; oversee the posting of guards when in camp or pickets in the field, command patrols or escorts for general officers; and command fatigue parties. Lieutenants were also chosen to serve on their regiment's staff, and may be assigned in an acting capacity to serve on the general staff of a higher unit.

=== Enlisted personnel ===
Non-commissioned officers of the 93rd New York Infantry Regiment in Bealeton, Virginia, in August 1863

Non-commissioned officers (NCOs) were important in the Union army in maintaining the order and alignment of formations during marches, battles, and transitioning between the two. Sergeants in particular were vital in this role as general guides and their selection ideally reserved for the most distinguished soldiers. NCOs were also charged with training individuals in how to be soldiers. While the captain or other company-level officers were responsible for training the soldiers when assembled into squads, platoons or as a company, experienced NCOs could take over this training as well. NCOs were also responsible for the regimental colors, which helped the unit maintain formation and serve as a rally point for the regiment. Typically a sergeant was designated the standard-bearer and protected by a color guard of corporals who only opened fire in defense of the colors. There were a number of staff NCO positions including quartermaster sergeant, ordnance sergeant, and commissary sergeant.

NCOs in the volunteer forces were quite different from their regular counterparts as the war began. Appointed to their role as each regiment was created, they were often on a first-name basis with both their superior officers and the enlisted men they were tasked to lead. Discipline among friends and neighbors was not enforced as strictly as in the regular army, and while some NCOs brought with them prior battlefield experience (whether from the Mexican–American War or foreign military service) many at the start of the war were as equally ignorant as their officers in military matters. Training for these NCOs took place during off-duty hours and often involved lessons based on manuals such as Hardee's Tactics. One notable exception was Michigan, which designated Fort Wayne as a training center for both officers and NCOs. As the war progressed NCOs gained valuable experience and even drastic disciplinary measures such as execution by firing squad were carried out when deemed necessary. The promotion of soldiers to NCOs (and NCOs to officers) was also increasingly based on battlefield performance, although each state maintained their own standards for when and where promotions could be granted.

Enlisted ranks

Enlisted Rank Structure
Sergeant Major	Quartermaster Sergeant	Ordnance Sergeant	First Sergeant	Sergeant	Corporal	Musician	Private
						No insignia	No insignia

- Sergeant Major: The sergeant major was the senior-most enlisted soldier of a regiment and was expected to serve as a model for the other enlisted personnel. Appointed by the regiment's colonel, among his responsibilities was to issue orders to the first sergeants, maintain a roster of the sergeants and corporals detailed to various tasks, and assist the regimental adjutant in his duties. If a regiment didn't have a drum major or chief musician, he also had responsibility for overseeing the musicians.
- Quartermaster Sergeant: The quartermaster sergeant was appointed by the regimental quartermaster to assist him in carrying out his duties. This included maintaining the store of supplies and serving as foreman for various work parties. Separately, each Union cavalry company was also authorized a quartermaster sergeant who performed similar tasks but was answerable to the company commander and first sergeant.
- Commissary Sergeant: Appointed by the regimental commissary, the commissary sergeant was responsible for assisting him in requisitioning and issuing rations to the regiment. Union cavalry companies and some artillery companies were also authorized a commissary sergeant to perform similar tasks.
- Hospital Steward: Regimental hospital stewards were responsible for the care of sick and wounded soldiers and their transportation to a general hospital, along with overseeing of any hospital property and medicines. Appointed by the colonel on the advice of the regiment's senior surgeon, they could direct any musicians (and later any Ambulance Corps assets) to assist in carrying out these duties. Hospital stewards assigned to general hospitals acted as supervisors to the rest of the hospital staff (except for the doctors). A single steward was considered sufficient for a 150-bed hospital, while a 500-bed hospital would require three stewards: a chief steward charged with administration, one to act as pharmacist and a third overseeing the preparation of meals.
- First Sergeant: The first sergeant was the senior NCO of a company and appointed by the captain to serve as its immediate supervisor. Among his duties were taking roll call, arresting and confining soldiers for offenses committed, and overseeing the company stores (assisted by the company commissary and/or quartermaster sergeants if present).
- Sergeant: Sergeants were chosen from among a company's corporals and important for supervising the other soldiers. Each sergeant was in command of a squad of soldiers and directed them in carrying out their duties while in camp or garrison. In battle, sergeants kept the soldiers in ranks and prevented them from falling out; if necessary this included shooting them if they attempted to run away. Sergeants oversaw the changing of guards and pickets, confinement of prisoners (which, if numerous enough, would require one sergeant assigned as provost-sergeant), and led patrols and fatigue parties. One sergeant in the regiment would be chosen as the color sergeant and, protected by the color guard, carried the regimental colors on parade and in battle.

Sergeants in the artillery branch commanded individual cannons as the Chief of Piece and were responsible for keeping it maintained and directing its use in battle. Sergeants of the Ordnance Department (distinct from the separate rank of Ordnance Sergeant) were employed at the various arsenals and armories with manufacturing and caring for the various arms and equipment. They were referred to as master armorers, master carriage-makers or master blacksmiths early in the war. Sergeants of the Corps of Engineers, in addition to the normal duties of a sergeant, also had to be knowledgeable in the construction of bridges, forts and other military engineering projects. In the Signal Corps, a sergeant was assigned to each signal officer, from whom he took instruction in order to assist with the sending and receiving of signals and performing mounted reconnaissance.

- Corporal: The lowest grade of NCO, corporals would be chosen from among a company's most competent privates and given charge of various tasks and duties. They might be given charge of small parties carrying out fatigue, police or guard duties, and in the absence of the sergeant they may take on their duties. The five most distinguished corporals of a regiment would be chosen to act as the color guard and accompany the color sergeant.

Artillery corporals acted as gunners and would assist the Chief of Piece in maintaining and aiming the cannon. As with sergeants, corporals of the Ordnance Department were employed at its various facilities. Their formal titles were armorer, carriage-maker or blacksmith until revised later in the war. Likewise, corporals in the Corps of Engineers were also required to be knowledgeable in practical military engineering in addition to their soldierly skills.

- Private: Privates carried out the basic functions of being a soldier in the Union army. When in camp or garrison they filled in on the various work details and fatigue parties, stood guard and policed the local area. They might be assigned to extra duties such as the company cook, tailor, clerk or as orderlies. In the field they were employed in tasks commiserate with their roles as infantry, cavalry or artillery soldiers. This included being deployed as pickets, skirmishers or flankers.

Soldiers could also be employed in special duties that were not strictly military in nature: mechanics and laborers, hospital attendants and cooks, regimental armorers, officers' servants, pioneers, couriers, scouts and spies. In the Corps of Engineers, Ordnance Department, and Signal Corps, privates were further differentiated as first class or second class. First class Engineer and Ordnance privates were formerly referred to as artificers, while second class privates were formerly referred to as laborers.

=== Southern Unionists ===
Southerners who were against the Confederate cause during the Civil War were known as Southern Unionists. They were also known as Union Loyalists or Lincoln's Loyalists. Within the eleven Confederate states, states such as Tennessee (especially East Tennessee), Virginia (which included West Virginia at the time), and North Carolina were home to the largest populations of Unionists. Many areas of Southern Appalachia harbored pro-Union sentiment as well. As many as 100,000 men living in states under Confederate control would serve in the Union army or pro-Union guerilla groups. For instance, Gen. William Shermans personal escort on his March to the Sea was the 1st Alabama Cavalry Regiment, composed of men from eastern Tennessee and northern Alabama. Although Southern Unionists came from all classes, most differed socially, culturally, and economically from the region's dominant pre-war planter class.

=== Ethnic composition ===
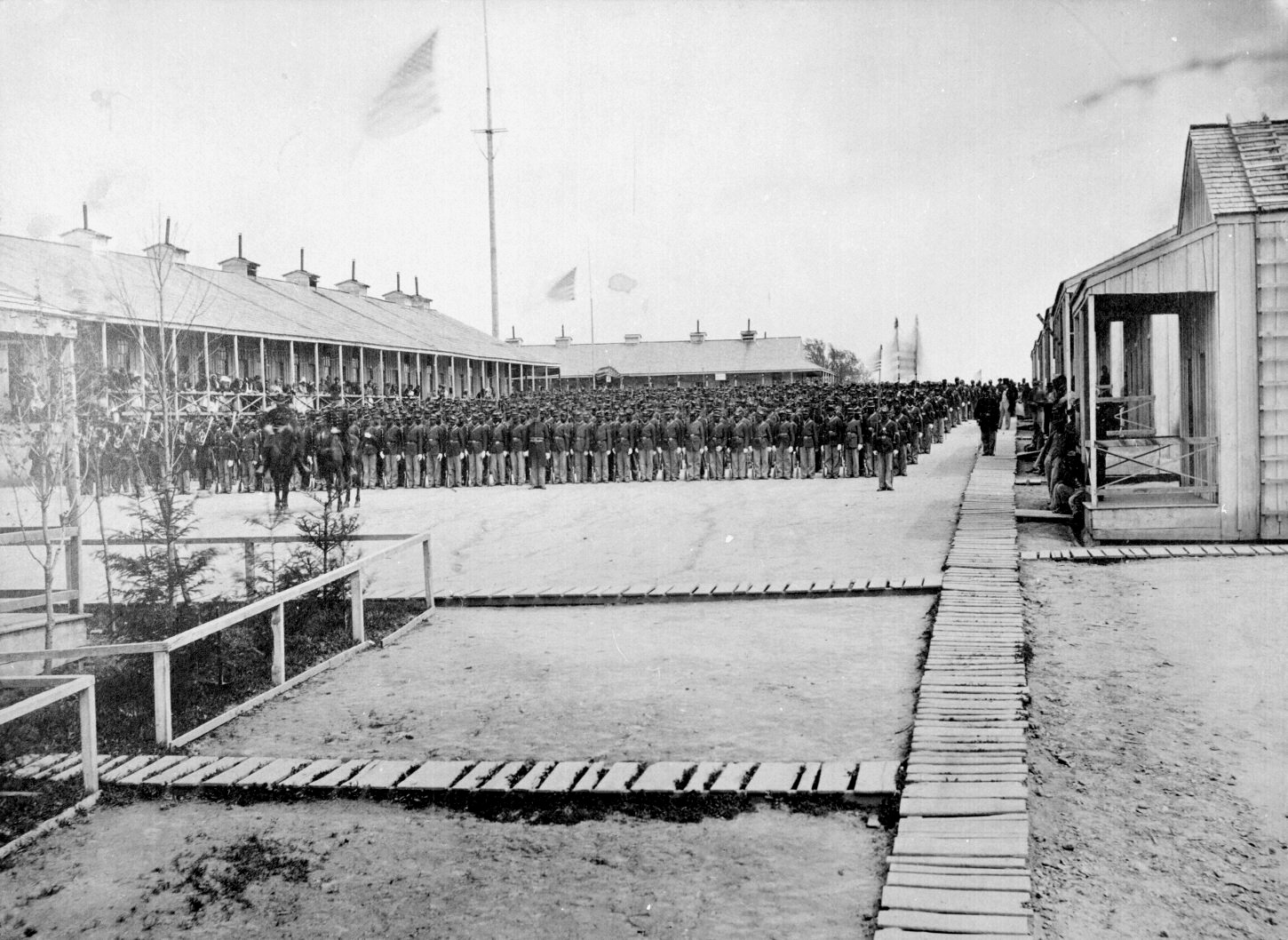
The 26th U.S. Colored Volunteer Infantry of the U.S. Colored Troops at Camp William Penn in present-day Cheltenham Township, Pennsylvania, in 1865

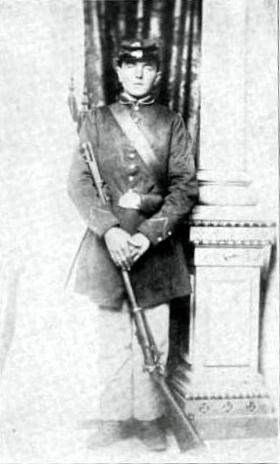
John Haag, a 21-year-old immigrant from Germany, affiliated with Company B of the 26th Wisconsin Infantry Regiment in August 1862

Native-born White Americans made up roughly two-thirds of the soldiers in the Union army, with the rest of many different ethnic groups, including large numbers of immigrants. About 25% of the white men who served in the Union army were foreign-born. The U.S. experienced its heaviest rate of immigration during the 1850s, and the vast majority of these people moved to the Northeastern states.

Among these immigrants, Germans constituted the largest group with a million arrivals between 1850 and 1860, many of them Forty-Eighters. Nearly as many Irish immigrants arrived during the same period. Immigrant soldiers were among the most enthusiastic in the Union army, not only from a desire to help save their adoptive home but to prove their patriotism towards it. To help cement immigrant enthusiasm and loyalty to the Union, several generals were appointed from these communities, including Franz Sigel and Michael Corcoran.

Ethnic composition of Union enlistments
Estimates	Origin
1,400,000	Native-born White American
216,000	Germans/German-American
210,000	African American
150,000	Irish-born
18,000 – 50,000	Canadian (Note: Alternative estimates place the number of enlistees much lower.)
50,000	English-born
49,000	Other (Scandinavian, Italian, Jewish, Mexican, Polish, Native American)
40,000	French/French-Canadian

Many immigrant soldiers formed their own regiments, such as the Irish Brigade, including the 69th New York, 63rd New York, 88th New York, 28th Massachusetts, 116th Pennsylvania; the Swiss Rifles (15th Missouri); the Gardes de Lafayette (55th New York); the Garibaldi Guard (39th New York); the Martinez Militia (1st New Mexico); the Polish Legion (58th New York); the German Rangers; Sigel Rifles (52nd New York, inheriting the 7th); the Cameron Highlanders (79th New York Volunteer Infantry); and the Scandinavian Regiment (15th Wisconsin). But for the most part, the foreign-born soldiers were scattered as individuals throughout units.

The Confederate army was less diverse: 91% of its soldiers were native-born white men and only 9% were foreign-born white men, with Irish being the largest group, other groups included Germans, French, British, and Mexicans. Most Mexicans happened to have been born when the Southwest was still part of Mexico. Some Confederate propaganda condemned foreign-born soldiers in the Union army, likening them to the German Hessian troops who fought alongside the British Army during the American Revolutionary War. A relatively smaller number of Native Americans, including members of Cherokee, Chickasaw, Choctaw and Muscogee peoples, fought for the Confederacy.

==== Italian Americans in the Union army ====
The great majority of Italian Americans, for both demographic and ideological reasons, served in the Union army (including generals Edward Ferrero and Francis B. Spinola). Six Italian Americans received the Medal of Honor during the war, among whom was Colonel Luigi Palma di Cesnola, who later became the first Director of the Metropolitan Museum of Arts in New York (1879–1904). Most of the Italian-Americans who joined the Union army were recruited from New York City. Many Italians of note were interested in the war and joined the army, reaching positions of authority. Brigadier General Edward Ferrero was the original commander of the 51st New York Regiment. He commanded both brigades and divisions in the eastern and western theaters of war and later commanded a division of the United States Colored Troops. Colonel Enrico Fardella, of the same and later of the 85th New York regiment, was made a brevet brigadier general when the war ended. Francis B. Spinola recruited four regiments in New York, was soon appointed Brigadier General by President Abraham Lincoln and given command of the Spinola Brigade. Later he commanded another unit, the famed Excelsior Brigade.

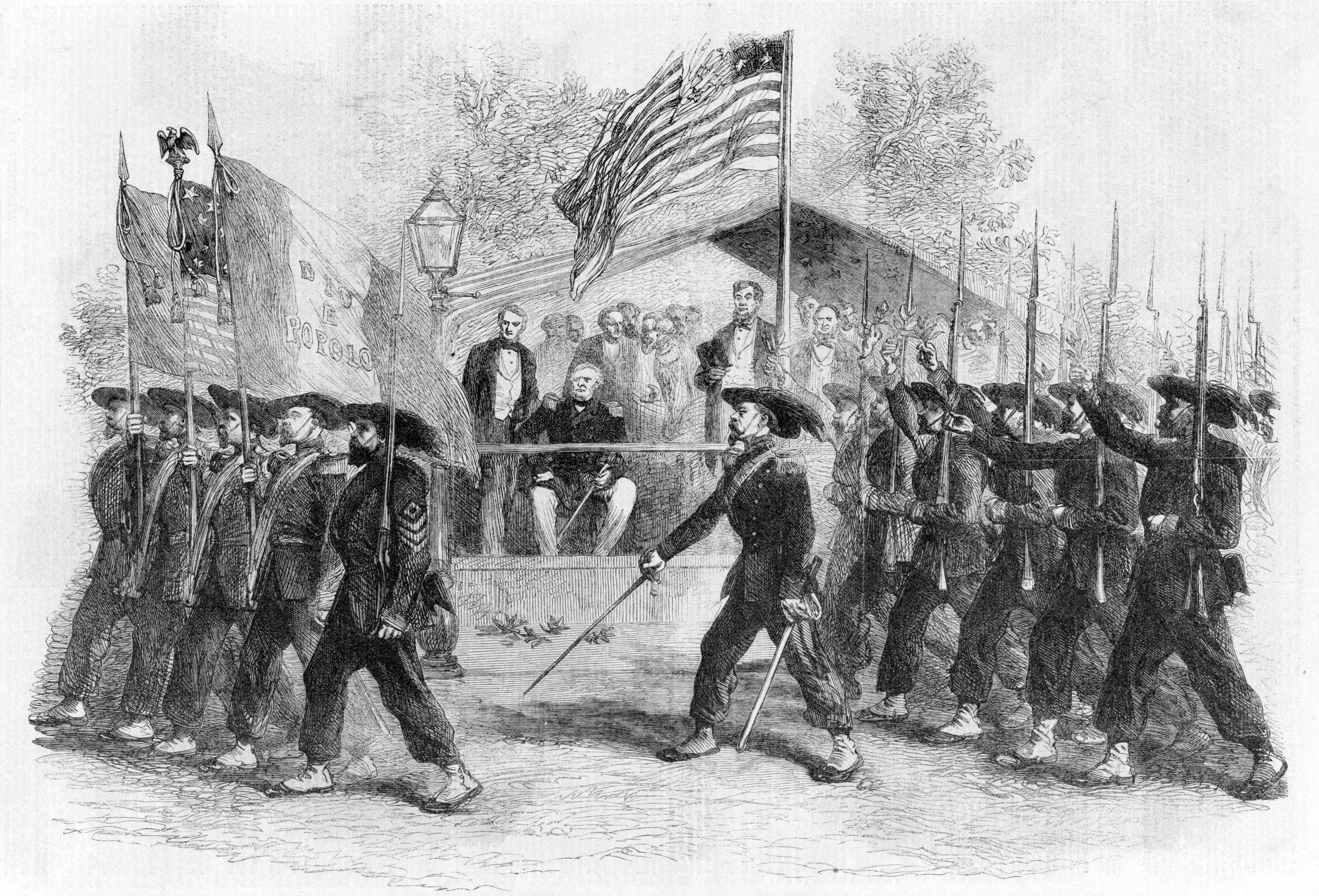
Review of the Garibaldi Guard by President Abraham Lincoln

The Garibaldi Guard recruited volunteers for the Union army from Italy and other European countries to form the 39th New York Infantry. At the outbreak of the American Civil War, Giuseppe Garibaldi was a very popular figure. The 39th New York Volunteer Infantry Regiment, of whose 350 members were Italian, was nicknamed Garibaldi Guard in his honor. The unit wore red shirts and bersaglieri plumes. They carried with them both a Union Flag as well as an Italian flag with the words Dio e popolo, meaning "God and people." In 1861 Garibaldi himself volunteered his services to President Abraham Lincoln. Garibaldi was offered a major general's commission in the U.S. Army through the letter from Secretary of State William H. Seward to H. S. Sanford, the U.S. Minister at Brussels, July 17, 1861.

Colonel Luigi Palma di Cesnola, a former Italian and British soldier and veteran of the Crimean War, commanded the 4th New York Cavalry and would rise to become one of the highest ranking Italian officer in the Union army. He established a military school in New York City where many young Italians were trained and later served in the Union army. Di Cesnola received the Medal of Honor for his actions during the Battle of Aldie. Two more famous examples were Francesco Casale and Luigi Tinelli, who were instrumental in the formation of the 39th New York Infantry Regiment. According to one evaluation of the Official Records of the Union and Confederate Armies, there were over 200 Italians who served as officers in the U.S. army.

==== African Americans in the Union army ====
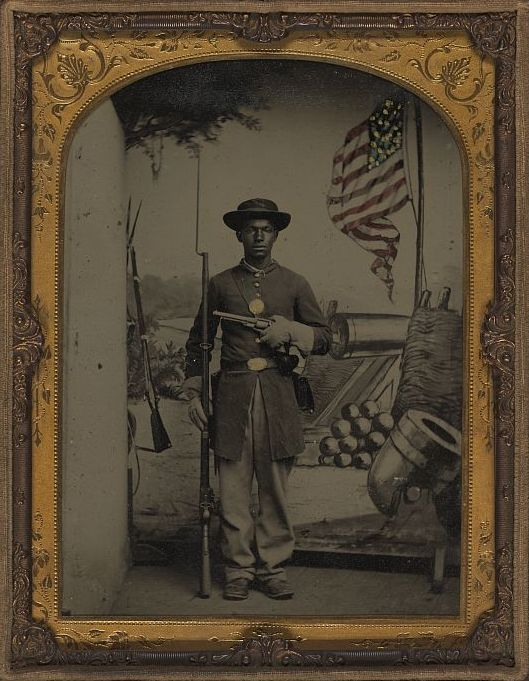
Portrait of an African American Union soldier at Benton Barracks

By 1860, the African American or Black population of the United States consisted of four million enslaved and half a million free Blacks. When the Civil War began, many freedmen in the North attempted to enlist in federal service but were barred from doing so. Popularly-held prejudices doubted whether Black people could be effective soldiers, and President Lincoln believed allowing their enlistment would anger Northern whites and alienate not just the South but the Border States too. However he eventually changed his mind and persuaded Congress to authorize the first official Black enlistment system in late 1862, which evolved into the United States Colored Troops.

Before they were allowed to enlist, many Black people volunteered their services to the Union army as cooks, nurses, and in other informal roles, and several volunteer regiments of Black troops were raised by the states. These included the 1st Kansas Colored Infantry Regiment, the first Black regiment to be raised and the first to engage in combat; the 1st Louisiana Native Guard, raised from both freedmen and escaped slaves after the Capture of New Orleans; and the 54th Massachusetts Infantry Regiment, which became the most famous Black unit after their valiant participation in the Battle of Fort Wagner. Their efforts helped to dispel the notion that Black soldiers were a liability, allowing about 200,000 Black soldiers to serve in the Union army during the Civil War.

Even as they served their country, Black soldiers were subject to discrimination. They were more often assigned to menial labor. Some Union officers refused to employ them in combat, but when they were they often had to use inferior weapons and equipment. Black soldiers were paid less than white soldiers ($10 vs $16 per month) until Congress yielded to public pressure and approved equal pay in June 1864. Black units were led predominantly by white officers, and while more than a hundred Black men were eventually made officers (not counting those passing as white), none were promoted to a rank higher than major. If captured by Confederate forces, Black soldiers risked being made slaves or summarily executed.

=== Women in the Union army ===
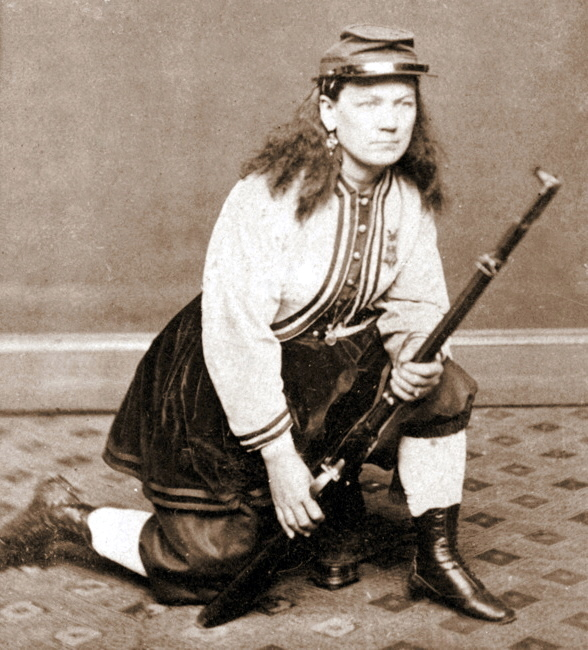
Kady Brownell, a vivandière from Rhode Island

Women took on many significant roles in the Union army and were important to its ultimate success on the battlefield. The most direct way they could help was to enlist and fight as soldiers, although women were officially barred from doing so. Nevertheless, it is believed hundreds of women disguised themselves as men in order to enlist. While many were discovered and forced to quit, others were only found out after they were killed in combat, and a number managed to serve throughout the entire war with their true identity successfully concealed.

One of the more traditional roles played by women in the Union army was that of camp followers. Thousands of white and Black women accompanied Union armies in an unofficial capacity to provide their services as cooks, laundresses, nurses and/or prostitutes. Many were the wives or other female relatives of the soldiers themselves who saw to their personal needs and (if time allowed) looked to the well-being of other soldiers. A somewhat more formal role for some camp followers was that of vivandière. Originally a female sutler, the role of vivandière expanded to include other responsibilities, including on the battlefield. Armed for their own protection, they brought water to thirsty soldiers, carried the regimental colors and rallied their fellow soldiers to fight, provided first aid or helped the wounded back to a field hospital. A related (and sometimes conflated) role was that of "daughter of the regiment". Often literally a daughter of one of the regimental officers, these women looked to the soldiers' well-being but also served as their regiment's "mascot" who inspired the men by wearing stylish clothing and enduring the same hardships as them. Some of the most prominent women to accompany the Union armies in the field include Anna Etheridge, Marie Tepe, and Nadine Turchin.

Women also sought to serve more formally as nurses in the Union army, many having been inspired by the work of Florence Nightingale during the Crimean War. However, there was strong resistance against these efforts at first. Societal prejudices saw women as too delicate and the job too unsuitable for women of social rank, particularly at the thought of unmarried women surrounded by thousands of men in close quarters. Nevertheless, Congress eventually approved for women to serve as nurses, to which Dorothea Dix – appointed Superintendent of Army Nurses – was responsible for setting hiring guidelines and starting a training program for prospective candidates. For the women who served, nursing during the Civil War was a hazardous occupation: grueling hours spent in close proximity to deadly diseases and nearby battlefields resulted in many suffering permanent disabilities or death. Added to this were the prejudices of the male medical officers in charge who did not want them there and frequently clashed with the nurses over issues of triage, patient treatments and hospice care. Tens of thousands of women served as nurses for the Union army, among whom are included Clara Barton, Susie King Taylor, Mary Edwards Walker, and Louisa May Alcott.

No less vital were the thousands of women who provided service to the Union army in the field of espionage. Early in the war, women were at a distinct advantage as spies, scouts, smugglers, and saboteurs: the idea of women participating in such dangerous lines of work was simply not considered. Eventually though their opponents recognized their existence, and while female spies caught in the act were not typically executed like their male colleagues, they still faced the threat of lengthy prison sentences. For self-evident reasons many of these activities were kept secret and any documentation (if it existed) was often destroyed. As such the identity of many of these women will never be known. Of those who became famous for their espionage work during or after the end of the war, prominent examples include Harriet Tubman, Mary Louvestre, Pauline Cushman, Elizabeth Van Lew, and Mary Bowser.

== Motivations ==
=== Anti-slavery sentiment ===
In his 1997 book examining the motivations of the American Civil War's soldiers, For Cause and Comrades, historian James M. McPherson states that Union soldiers fought to preserve the United States, as well as to end slavery, stating that:

While restoration of the Union was the main goal for which they fought, they became convinced that this goal was unattainable without striking against slavery.

— James M. McPherson, For Cause and Comrades: Why Men Fought in the Civil War (1997), p. 118, emphasis added.

McPherson states that witnessing the slave system of the Confederacy first-hand also strengthened the anti-slavery views of Union soldiers, who were appalled by its brutality. He stated that "Experience in the South reinforced the antislavery sentiments of many soldiers." One Pennsylvanian Union soldier spoke to a slave woman whose husband was whipped, and was appalled by what she had to tell him of slavery. He stated that "I thought I had hated slavery as much as possible before I came here, but here, where I can see some of its workings, I am more than ever convinced of the cruelty and inhumanity of the system."

== Army administration and issues ==
=== Adjutant General's Department ===
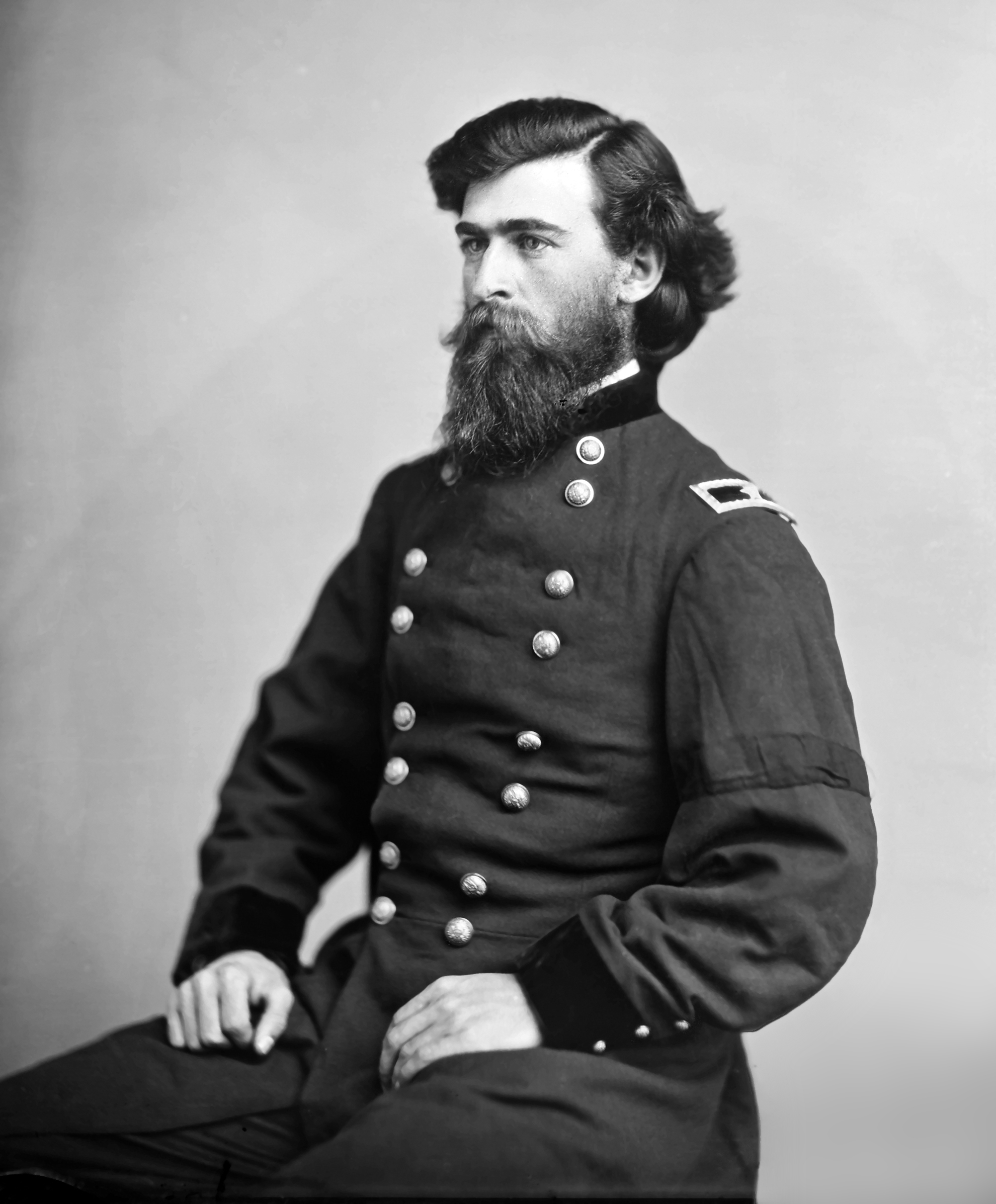
Llewellyn F. Haskell (1842–1929), United States Army officer and a Union general during the American Civil War

The responsibilities and functions of the Adjutant General's Department (AGD) were many and varied during the course of the Civil War, but principle among them was handling military correspondence between the President, Secretary of War and General-in-Chief, and the rest of the army. Other functions included administering recruitment, overseeing the appointment of chaplains, maintaining personnel records, and issuing instruction books and other forms. During the war, some of the department's responsibilities and functions were spun off to new offices while new ones were added. The recruitment of new white volunteers and draftees, and the suppression and punishment of absenteeism and desertion, was given to the newly formed Provost Marshal General's Bureau in May 1863, while the position of Commissioner for the Exchange of Prisoners was created to take over this function from the AGD. The Bureau of Colored Troops was created within the AGD specifically to oversee the creation of the United States Colored Troops, and in the final year of the war the AGD was given the responsibility for collecting and editing documents which would constitute The War of the Rebellion: A Compilation of the Official Records of the Union and Confederate Armies.

At the start of the Civil War, the AGD numbered just fourteen regular officers: the Adjutant General (AG) with the rank of colonel, a lieutenant-colonel, four brevet majors, and eight brevet captains. In August 1861 the AG was raised to major-general and the strength of the AGD increased to twenty officers, and a year later it was reorganized to constitute the AG, two colonels, four lieutenant-colonels, and thirteen majors. The small number of civilian clerical staff supporting the officers was also increased as the war progressed, including the addition of up to ten noncommissioned officers by 1862. However to meet the need for assistant adjutant generals authorized for each corps, division and brigade, appointments were made from among the volunteer forces, and by 1865 there were an additional 85 majors and 256 captains serving in these capacities. At the regimental level, one of the unit's lieutenants would be selected to serve as its adjutant.

In spite of the rapid increase of the army at the start presenting numerous challenges and being perpetually understaffed throughout the war, the AGD appears to have handled its responsibilities competently and with little disruption. The AGD also had fewer conflicts with field commanders compared to some of the other departments, partly because its authority was well-established and issued few controversial orders itself, and it was less affected by matters of procurement and emerging technologies.

Leadership

Colonel Lorenzo Thomas was named Adjutant General of the army on March 7, 1861, one day after Col. Samuel Cooper resigned to join the Confederacy. While Thomas served as the AG throughout the entirety of the war, he eventually ran afoul of Secretary Stanton, who reassigned him to the job of recruiting soldiers for black regiments in the western theater. From March 1863 on then, the assistant adjutant general Colonel Edward D. Townsend essentially was the acting AG in Washington.

=== Bureau of Military Justice ===
An office of the Judge Advocate had existed in the US Army since its founding, consisting at the start of the Civil War of a single officer with the rank of major and small civilian clerical staff in Washington. It was not until after the war began however that Congress formally authorized the appointment of a Judge Advocate General (JAG) and creation of the Bureau of Military Justice, a de facto department and forerunner to a true Judge Advocate General's Department. The principal functions of the JAG included conducting courts-martial and inquiries; codifying the laws of war and the military laws of the United States; reviewing the records of courts-martial, military commissions and inquiries; and asserting the jurisdiction of military commissions over civilians in times of war.

To meet the demands of a vastly larger army, Congress authorized in July 1862 the appointment of a JAG with the rank of colonel and for President Lincoln to appoint a judge advocate of volunteers with the rank of major for each army in the field. These judge advocates were to advise commanders on legal issues, prosecute offenses, and review and maintain the records of courts-martial and other proceedings in the field. A year later, Congress legislated the creation of the Bureau of Military Justice, gave it an appellant function, and authorized the JAG to head it as a brigadier general alongside an assistant JAG with the rank of colonel. With these authorizations came a small increase in the size of the clerical staff assisting the JAG.

During the war the JAG and his subordinates were able to satisfactorily handle the increased volume and complexity of legal matters that came with the exponential growth of the army. Among their most important accomplishments was the creation of the Lieber Code and, for the first time, collecting all precedents, decisions and opinions which had become US military law into a single digest and publishing it in early 1865. One of the most controversial issues associated with the bureau was the use of military commissions to try civilians, an issue which would not be settled until Ex parte Milligan was decided in 1866.

Leadership

The Civil War began with brevet Major John F. Lee serving as the judge advocate of the army until September 3, 1862, when Joseph Holt was formally appointed as JAG. Holt played an important parts in helping to expanding the office of the JAG and oversaw some of the most important and sensitive trials of the war. However Holt also made many enemies while JAG and was severely criticized for his handling of the trial of President Lincoln's assassins.

=== Bureau of Refugees, Freedmen, and Abandoned Lands ===
In March 1865 the Bureau of Refugees, Freedmen, and Abandoned Lands was created by Congress with a mandate to see to the needs of all Black freedmen and white refugees, and the management of all lands within the rebel states which had been abandoned or otherwise come into the possession of the United States. It consisted of a commissioner as head of the bureau, an assistant commissioner for each of the rebel states, and a small staff of one chief and nine other clerks. Additionally, any military officer could be assigned to duty on behalf of the bureau. Major General Oliver Otis Howard was appointed to head the bureau at its creation and lead it throughout its lifetime. While the Freedmen's Bureau was the center of much controversy during the Reconstruction era and some of the relief it provided was less than satisfactory, its most important contribution was in providing education to many Blacks and poor whites.

=== Corps of Engineers ===
The Corps of Engineers was a small part of the army prior to the Civil War but played an important role not only in the conflict but for the nation as a whole. The Corps was responsible for running the United States Military Academy at West Point, which supplied officers to all branches but whose top graduates were commissioned into the Corps. They were not only involved with military engineering such as constructing fortifications and harbor defenses but also oversaw civil engineering including building canals, bridges and similar projects. This focus on civil works did prevent the Corps from devoting its entire effort to the war though. Corps personnel acted as combat engineers during battle, helping to construct pontoon bridges, repair roads and bridges, dig trenches, and conduct reconnaissance. The Corps also exerted an influence beyond its small size as many of the Union's most prominent officers, including McClellan and Meade, were themselves trained as engineers and used their knowledge to influence the outcome of battles.

Prior to the war, the Corps of Engineers consisted of just forty-eight officers and a single company of 150 engineer troops. Engineer Company A was first created for the Mexican–American War and guarded President Lincoln at his first inauguration. It was organized with ten sergeants (master-workmen), ten corporals (overseers), two musicians, sixty-four first-class privates (artificers) and sixty-four second-class privates (laborers). In August 1861 Congress authorized the formation of three more companies to be organized the same as Engineer Company A, with all four organized into a single battalion (the US Engineer Battalion, later 1st Engineer Battalion), and the addition of two lieutenant colonels, four majors and six lieutenants to the Corps. The battalion had no formal headquarters but fell under the command of the most senior officer present. In March 1863, when the Corps of Topographical Engineers was disbanded and its function merged with the Corps of Engineers, Congress further revised the Corps to consist of a brigadier-general as Chief Engineer, four colonels, ten lieutenant-colonels, twenty majors, thirty captains, thirty first lieutenants and ten second lieutenants.

The US Engineer Battalion served ably as part of the Army of the Potomac, but on its own was insufficient to see to the army's need for engineers throughout the different theaters of war. A small number of volunteer engineer regiments were formed during the war, including the 1st Michigan Engineers and Mechanics Regiment, the 1st New York Engineer Regiment and the 1st United States Veteran Volunteer Engineer Regiment. However, in many cases engineering work was carried out by line soldiers under the supervision of officers with engineering backgrounds, if any were available. Most types of engineering work, such as digging simple earthworks or laying small bridges, did not require the specialized skills of engineers, which were required for complex endeavors like constructing pontoon bridges or forts. Union armies typically detailed soldiers to form company-sized detachments of pioneers to repair roads or bury the dead after a battle.

Leadership

Brigadier General Joseph Gilbert Totten was in charge of the Corps of Engineers when the Civil War began. Having held this position since 1838, his chief concern before the war was maintaining the nation's coastal fortifications. He effectively ran the Corps and maintained its independence until his abrupt death on April 22, 1864 due to pneumonia. He was replaced by Brigadier General Richard Delafield who served through the end of the war.

=== Corps of Topographical Engineers ===
The Corps of Topographical Engineers had been established in 1831 with the mission of exploration, surveying, and cartography, particularly in the American West. Topographical engineers (or "topogs") including John C. Frémont, Howard Stansbury, William H. Emory and Gouverneur K. Warren were instrumental in the westward expansion of the United States. During the war, the civilian nature of the Corps' mission was largely suspended and it undertook the role of reconnaissance, construction of defensive works and supplying maps to the army. In these conditions drawing a distinction between the two corps became increasingly impractical, until in March 1863 the Corps of Topographical Engineers was disbanded and its mission taken up by the Corps of Engineers.

The Topographical Engineers numbered forty-five officers before the Civil War. In August 1861 an additional two lieutenant colonels, four majors and six lieutenants were authorized by Congress. There were no enlisted men in the Corps, although when the Corps was expanded Congress also authorized a company of engineers for the Topographical Engineers to be modeled after the Corps of Engineers. However this company was never formed, and the actual size of the Corps shrank as a number retired, died, defected to the Confederacy or became general officers of the volunteers, until eventually the remaining officers were absorbed by the Corps of Engineers.

The most important role played by the Topographical Engineers, even after their merger with the regular Corps, was providing desperately-needed maps to army commanders. Each field army headquarters established their own topographical departments under the supervision of engineer officers, which would provide the army with maps necessary for a given campaign. Such departments themselves were staffed with teams of draughtsmen and assistants and stocked with printing presses, photographic and lithographic equipment.

Leadership

The Chief of Topographical Engineers at the start of the Civil War was Colonel John James Abert. Colonel Abert had been responsible for lobbying Congress to make the Corps an independent branch of War Department and was appointed to lead his creation in 1838. He retired in September 1861 and was replaced by Stephen Harriman Long, who remained in the position until the Corps was disbanded. Thereafter he continued to serve in the Corps of Engineers as the senior officer to the Chief Engineer.

=== Inspector General's Department ===
At the start of the Civil War, there was technically no Inspector General's Department, with neither a set of operating practices or centralized direction. Instead there were two Inspector Generals (IGs) with the rank of colonel whose duty was to conduct inspections and investigations to ensure the army was organized and operating at full readiness, but these were done in an ad-hoc manner at the discretion of the Secretary of War. As the war progressed and membership in the inspectorate increased, the duties of IGs and assistant IGs were continually redefined, to the extent that any time a problem was identified the common response was simply to assign an inspector to it. Eventually in January 1863 a permanent office of the IG was established in Washington, and it was from here that the process of exerting a centralized control over IGs in the field and crafting standard policies and procedures was started.

In August 1861, Congress authorized an increase of two additional IGs with the rank of colonel and five assistant IGs with the rank of major from among the regular army. This number stayed the same throughout the entire war, with the addition of a small civilian clerical staff once the Washington office was established. Congress eventually determined that each geographical department, army, corps, division and brigade would also be assigned an IG or assistant IG, however these positions were to be filled by regular or volunteer officers detailed from line units of the army or from the other staff departments.

The inspectorate faced many challenges during the Civil War, including hostility and lack of cooperation from some commanders and the mixed performance of some IGs in the field. Despite these issues it was able to successfully meet the challenges of the war overall, particularly with bringing under control the waste, fraud and abuse which had been rampant at the start of the conflict.

Leadership

At the start of the war the inspectorate consisted of Colonel Sylvester Churchill, the senior IG of the army, and Colonel Joseph K. Mansfield, the junior IG. Churchill however took leave in April 1861 on account of his health and formally retired in September that year, while Mansfield was promoted to major-general and left to command troops in May. Colonel Henry Lee Scott replaced Mansfield that same month, but when Churchill retired his position was given to Colonel Randolph Marcy, father-in-law to George McClellan, in the same month. Serving as the chief of staff to McClellan, Marcy did not formally take up his duties as senior IG until after the Battle of Antietam, by which point however his association with McClellan had soured Marcy's relationship with Secretary Stanton, who sent him on inspection tours of various geographical departments. Instead, the de facto leader of the inspectorate was whoever was the IG in charge of the Washington office, which was Colonel Delos Sacket between January 1863 and March 1864, and Colonel James Allen Hardie for the remainder of the war.

=== Medical Department ===
The Army Medical Department (AMD) was rivaled only by the Quartermaster's Department in the scope and complexity of its responsibilities: caring for sick and wounded soldiers, operating field and general hospitals, and acquiring and distributing medicine, medical equipment, hospital food and similar supplies. Functions such as evacuating soldiers off the battlefield or constructing hospitals were handled were handled by other departments, though later in the war the AMD assumed many of these roles. In March 1864 it was placed in charge of casualty evacuation (U.S. Ambulance Corps) and the organization and operation of medical supply trains. In December it was given control over the construction and equipping of military hospitals, and of hospital trains and hospital ships in February 1865. Other responsibilities assumed during the war included care for disabled veterans and their families, prisoners of war, refugees and freed slaves; maintaining medical records of the dead and wounded; and preparing a medical and surgical history of the war. The AMD started out the war staffed by a conservative and inflexible leadership which negatively impacted its functioning, but would eventually be rectified by war's end.

Regular army medical personnel
Position	1862	1863	1864	1865
Surgeon General (BG)	1	1	1	1
Assistant Surgeon General (COL)	1	1	1	1
Medical Inspector General (COL)	1	1	1	1
Medical Inspector (LTC)	8	16	16	16
Surgeon (MAJ)	50	50	50	50
Assistant Surgeon (CPT)	14	5	3	
Assistant Surgeon (1LT)	100	109	111	114
Medical Storekeeper	6	6	6	6
Medical Cadet	70	70	70	70
Hospital Steward	201	471	650	931

In April 1861 the AMD was the largest of the staff departments in the regular army: a Surgeon General (with the rank of colonel), thirty surgeons, eighty-three assistant surgeons, and fifty-nine Hospital Stewards. However this number was barely adequate to meet the needs of the army in peacetime, and in May 1861 an additional ten surgeons and twenty assistant surgeons were added to cover the new regular army regiments being raised. Later that year in August, Congress authorized the appointment of fifty medical cadets to be chosen from young men with a liberal education and prior medical experience. They had the rank and pay of West Point cadets and were to act as ambulance attendants in the field and assistants in general hospitals.

In April 1862, Congress authorized a substantial reorganization of the AMD. Beyond promoting the surgeon general to brigadier general and adding additional staff, one of the most controversial was the introduction of medical inspectors, as a number of these were appointed by Secretary Stanton for "political" purposes. Charged with supervising all aspects of sanitary conditions within the army, their purview included the inspection of quarters, camps, hospitals and transports; their duties were later expanded to include issuing certificates of discharge for reasons of disability. Congress also gave the surgeon general the authority to hire as many hospital stewards as necessary, and a month later they authorized the addition of six trained apothecaries and druggists as medical storekeepers.

Most regular army medical officers served in staff positions, whether at the office in Washington or out in the field as regimental surgeons, attending physicians in general hospitals, medical purveyors who ran medical supply depots and laboratories, or as the medical director of a division, corps, field army or military department. Medical directors oversaw the operation of field hospitals and the associate medical personnel, field sanitation and medical supply within their command. However, there was no statutory basis for their assignment, and it wasn't until February 1865 when Congress bowed to pressure and provided for officers serving in these capacities to receive rank, pay and emoluments appropriate to their responsibilities.

Added to the relatively small number of regular army medical personnel were a further 546 surgeons and assistant surgeons volunteers, appointed by the president to supplement regular army personnel in staff positions; another 5,532 civilian doctors employed under contract (mainly in general hospitals) as acting assistant surgeons; a small number of medical officers of the Veteran Reserve Corps; and the thousands of regimental surgeons and assistant surgeons appointed to the volunteer regiments by their respective state governors. Thousands more civilians were employed by the AMD as nurses, clerks, hospital attendants, laborers, etc. The AMD was further augmented by a number of private and semi-official philanthropic organizations, foremost among which was the United States Sanitary Commission (USCC).

The chaotic aftermath of the first Battle of Bull Run – no coordination between field hospitals and casualty evacuation, regimental surgeons refusing to treat soldiers from other units, and the few ambulance drivers robbing their charges or fleeing – exemplified the inadequacies of pre-war planning and preparations. Burdened with an aged and conservative leadership, it took the injection of more enlightened leaders to make the necessary reforms for the AMD to meet these new challenges. By the war's end, the AMD had implemented a better method of evacuating battlefield casualties to field hospitals and general hospitals, established laboratories to test and certify drugs and other medicines, identified reliable sources of supply and implemented effective contracting procedures, and increased the number of medical personnel to see to the needs of over a million men under arms.

Some challenges remained however, against which only small progress was made. Although improved field sanitation reduced disease rates and some advances like the use of chloroform proved helpful, a lack of aseptic surgery or general understanding of the germ theory led to many deaths from disease, shock or secondary infection. Psychological trauma was not well understood and the average soldier made due with an inadequate diet for maintaining their health. The AMD's reliance on the Quartermaster and Subsistence departments for transportation and rations respectively left these subject to interdepartmental rivalry until late in the war, and personal conflict between military commanders and their supporting medical personnel could lead to problematic health outcomes. Despite these faults, AMD personnel did their best to alleviate the suffering of their fellow soldiers and laid the groundwork for future improvement.

Leadership

The Surgeon General at the start of the war was Colonel Thomas Lawson, who at 97 years was on his deathbed and his duties were being carried out Major Robert C. Wood, one of his assistants. When he passed in May 1861 Lawson was succeeded by Clement Finley, another old soldier who was characterized by contemporaries as "utterly ossified and useless". Finley was slow to act, failed to reform the AMD to address the needs of the war, and particularly opposed to the use of female nurses. He was forced to retire by Secretary Stanton in April 1862 and replaced with William A. Hammond, who immediately went about reorganizing the AMD, eliminating red tape and promoting competent young men to positions of authority. His strong independent streak also earned the enmity of Secretary Stanton, who in September 1863 sent him on an extended tour of the western theater and made Colonel Joseph Barnes the acting Surgeon General. When Hammond was arrested, court-martialed and dismissed in August 1864, Barnes was promoted to fill his position. Barnes remained the Surgeon General until after the war's end and succeeded in continuing Hammond's reforms by maintaining an excellent relationship with Secretary Stanton.

=== Ordnance Department ===
The principal mission of the Ordnance Department (ORDD) during the Civil War was the development, procurement, storage, distribution and repair of all army ordnance and ordnance-related equipment such as limbers and caissons and accoutrements. It was also responsible for the procurement of horses to pull artillery until June 1861 when the Quartermaster Department took over that job. The department faced challenges during the war, particularly during the early months as it struggled to arm the vastly expanded Union army whilst traitorous forces seized control of a number of arsenals and depots. Eventually it was able to resolve many of these challenges and succeeded in providing thousands of field artillery pieces and millions of small arms for the Union army.

When the Civil War began the Ordnance Department was commanded by a Chief of Ordnance and authorized forty officers, many in command of the army's arsenals and depots; fifteen ORDD military storekeepers; seventy ordnance sergeants, often placed in supervisory roles including command of some depots and arsenals; and four hundred enlisted men, most of whom were employed as technicians at the armories and arsenals. Hundreds of civilians were also employed, not only as clerks and laborers but also technicians and supervisors. There were also artificiers on the rolls of the army's artillery regiments who were responsible for the maintenance of weapons within their regiments.

Even in peacetime the size of the ORDD was insufficient, as fifty-six officers alone would've been required to bring the arsenals to their full authorized strength, and it proved inadequate once the war began. In August 1861 Congress increased the authorized number of officers to forty-five: the Chief of Ordnance (brigadier general), two colonels, two lieutenant colonels, four majors, twelve captains, twelve first lieutenants, and twelve second lieutenants. This still was not enough, and so in March 1863 an additional lieutenant colonel, two majors, eight captains and eight first lieutenants were added, bringing the authorized strength to sixty-four officers where it would remain for the rest of the war. The number of ordnance sergeants and enlisted personnel were similarly increased on a yearly basis, until by 1865 they numbered 163 and 560 respectively, and the civilian staff was likewise increased.

In the field, each regiment was authorized an ordnance officer (to be chosen from among the unit's lieutenants) who, assisted by an ordnance sergeant, saw to the requisition and issuing of arms to the troops and management of the regimental ammunition train. For brigades and higher echelons of command, an ordnance officer was authorized to serve on the unit's staff with similar responsibilities. However unlike with the other supply departments, the ordnance department did not commission any volunteer officers to this role, instead relying on ORRD officers or (at division level and below) relying on regular officers filling the role as acting ordnance officers or combining the role with the assigned quartermaster.

The ORDD maintained a number of arsenals, armories and depots, where the majority of the army's arms, ammunition and other ordnance-related supplies were manufactured and/or stored. A number were seized before or at the war's outbreak, but more were created after fighting began and existing ones were expanded. By the middle of the war, the largest arsenals employed between one and two thousand civilians each. A substantial number of these employees were women and children, partly because they could be paid less than adult male workers, their small hands were thought to be better suited to assembling cartridges, and women were believed to be more safety-oriented. Their line of work was dangerous for obvious reasons, and a number died in accidental explosions during the war. In the single-worst accident of the war, the explosion at the Allegheny Arsenal, 70 of the 78 victims were women and girls.

United States Arsenals, Armories and Depots
Name	Location	Established	Notes
Springfield Armory	Springfield, MA	1794	Principal US Army armory
Harpers Ferry Armory	Harper's Ferry, VA	1796	Destroyed April 1861, seized by CSA
Allegheny Arsenal	Pittsburgh, PA	1814	
Watervliet Arsenal	Watervliet, NY	1814	
Champlain Arsenal	Vergennes, VT	1816	Discontinued 1855, reestablished 1861
Frankford Arsenal	Philadelphia, PA	1816	
Rome Arsenal	Rome, NY	1816	
Bellona Arsenal	Richmond, VA	1816	Discontinued 1835, seized by Virginia April 1861
Washington Arsenal	Washington, D.C.	1816	
Watertown Arsenal	Watertown, MA	1816	
Pikesville Arsenal	Pikesville, MD	1819	
Augusta Arsenal	Augusta, GA	1826	Seized by Georgia militia January 1861
Baton Rouge Arsenal	Baton Rouge, LA	1826	Seized by Louisiana militia January 1861
Kennebec Arsenal	Augusta, ME	1827	
St. Louis Arsenal	St. Louis, MO	1827	
Mount Vernon Arsenal	Mount Vernon, AL	1829	Seized by Alabama militia January 1861
Detroit Arsenal	Dearborn, MI	1832	
Apalachicola Arsenal	Apalachicola, FL	1833	Seized by Florida militia January 1861
New York Arsenal	Governors Island, NY	1836	
Fayetteville Arsenal	Fayetteville, NC	1836	Seized by North Carolina militia April 1861
Little Rock Arsenal	Little Rock, AR	1837	Seized by Arkansas authorities February 1861
Fort Monroe Arsenal	Old Point Comfort, VA	1838	
Charleston Arsenal	Charleston, SC	1841	Seized by South Carolina militia December 1860
Leavenworth Arsenal	Leavenworth, KS	1847	
Benicia Arsenal	Benicia, CA	1851	
San Antonio Arsenal	San Antonio, TX	1855	Seized by Texas militia February 1861
Vancouver Arsenal	Fort Vancouver, WA	1859	
Fort Union Arsenal	Fort Union, NM	1860	
Louisville Depot	Louisville, KY	1861	
Nashville Depot	Nashville, TN	1862	
Columbus Arsenal	Columbus, OH	1863	
Indianapolis Arsenal	Indianapolis, IN	1863	
Rock Island Arsenal	Rock Island, IL	1863	

The ORDD faced an immediate crisis when the war began as it was suddenly responsible for arming the rapidly-expanding number of troops being brought into Federal service. This job was made more difficult by actions taken by Secretary of War John B. Floyd before the war, when he ordered the transfer of large numbers of arms from Northern to Southern arsenals and the sale of Federal arms to various Southern states. When the Southern states did seize the arsenals within their territory, in addition to the gun-making equipment at Harper's Ferry they were able to acquire about 159,000 small arms, 429 cannons, and 4.5 million rounds of small arms ammunition. ORDD was forced to make up the immediate shortfall by contracting with private companies or purchasing from European powers; many weapons bought under contract proved to be inferior to government standards or sold at inflated prices, while European governments were happy to get rid of their obsolete weapons. Eventually the fraud and corruption was brought under control and ORDD was able to bring its arsenals' productions levels up to where they could meet the army's need. This can be seen with the rapid expansion of the Springfield Armory, which before the war averaged 800 muskets a month but by January 1863 was producing 24,000 muskets and rifles a month.

A more persistent issue faced by ORDD were efforts by members of Congress, the general public, and even President Lincoln to get them to adopt many new military technologies, particularly breech-loading and repeating rifles like the Spencer and Henry rifle. The department's senior leadership was unwilling to wholeheartedly embrace this technology without extensive field testing, and worried over delays from retooling manufacturing equipment and other logistical concerns that went with their adoption. Nevertheless, a limited number of these weapons were purchased and distributed to troops in the field, and trials were undertaken to determine which one would become the army's standard rifle for general use, although these weren't completed until well after the war ended.

After the war ORDD came under harsh criticisms, particularly over their conservatism in regards to new technology. However it did meet the challenge of equipping the Union army with many modern weapons and other materiel. From the beginning of the war to the end, Federal arsenals produced 7,892 cannons with over six million artillery shot and shell and six million pounds of grapeshot and canister shot; more than 4 million small arms with over a billion rounds of small arms ammunition; over 13,000 tons of gunpowder and 45,000 tons of lead; and nearly 3 million complete sets of infantry and cavalry accoutrements and horse equipment.

Leadership

Henry K. Craig was the Chief of Ordnance when the Civil War began, having served in that position since 1851. Craig received much of the blame for the poor state of affairs at the time, and angered many special interests by resisting the purchase of new and untested weapons in favor of increasing arsenal production and limiting purchases to reputable domestic and international sources. His obstinate behavior saw Craig relieved and replaced with James Wolfe Ripley on April 23, 1861. However Ripley was similarly resistant to these same private contractors and their Congressional backers, particularly with adopting breech-loading rifles, and so was forced to retire on September 15, 1863. His replacement, George D. Ramsay, was more open to the new weaponry but did not have the confidence of Secretary Stanton, who inserted Captain George T Balch into Ramsay's headquarters to "call the shots". Ramsay endured this situation until forced to retire on September 12, 1864. Alexander Brydie Dyer took over as Chief of Ordnance and served out the remainder of the war heading the department. While resistant to the lobbyists like his predecessors, Dyer was a more enthusiastic proponent of breech-loading and repeating rifles. He was also more bureaucratically adept and able to remain on good terms with Secretary Stanton.

=== Pay Department ===
The Pay Department had the responsibility of accounting for, maintaining records regarding, and disbursing of funds for payment to army personnel, including allowances and bounties, as well as settling claims against the government related to pay and allowances. It was not however responsible for payments on contracts and other obligations incurred by the Army as those were handled by the respective department. Payments to officers and soldiers was supposed to be made on a bi-monthly basis, although circumstances might see these delayed significantly (as much as by eight months in some cases).

As originally organized the Pay Department was headed by a paymaster general with the rank of colonel, two deputy paymasters general with the rank of lieutenant colonel, and twenty-five paymasters with the rank of major. There were also a small number of civilian clerks, but no enlisted personnel assigned to the department. Cash was received directly by the paymaster general from the Treasury Department and forwarded to the supervising paymaster of a given "pay district" or field headquarters. These funds were then distributed under armed guard to the officers and soldiers within the pay district. Pay districts generally coincided with the boundaries of military divisions, departments and districts, which as the army grew the number and size of pay districts grew likewise. This required the appointment of more paymasters during the course of the war and an increase in the number of civilian clerks, the latter of which reached a peak of 155 by 1864.

The rapid increase in the size of the army presented a significant challenge to the Pay Department, as the number of soldiers needed to be paid was over fifty times greater than the pre-war size. This was particularly the case for sick and wounded soldiers who were separated from their units and so harder to located. However while payments were occasionally delayed, it never got to the point where soldiers felt compelled to mutiny as had been done during the Revolution. In the four years and four months of the Civil War, the Pay Department disbursed $1,029,239,000 of which $541,000 was lost due to embezzlements and other causes, at an expense of $6,429,600.

Leadership

When the Civil War began, Colonel Benjamin F. Larned served as Paymaster General but was in poor health. He was temporarily relieved of duty in July 1862 due to illness and would die a few months later. From July until December of that year, Major Cary H. Fry served as the acting Paymaster General, when Timothy Andrews was appointed to the position. He would remain in that position until retiring in November 1864, when Benjamin Brice was appointed in his place and finished out the war as Paymaster General. Both Andrews and Brice argued that the position of Paymaster General should made a brigadier general and the number and rank of subordinate paymasters similarly increased, commensurate with the type of expansion other administrative departments experienced during the war, but their recommendations were ignored.

=== Provost Marshal General's Bureau ===
The Provost Marshal General's Bureau (PMGB) was created to oversee the apprehension of deserters, conduct counterespionage, and recover stolen government property. Originally established as an office of the AGD in September 1862, it was made an independent department in May 1863 as part of the Conscription Act of 3 March 1863. The Conscription Act also made it responsible for the administration of the draft system, with two other responsibilities added later that year: first with the management of the Invalid Corps in April, and then the recruitment of white volunteers in May. Intended only as temporary organization for the duration of the war the PMGB was effectively terminated in August 1866, whereupon all records, funds and responsibilities were transferred to the AGD.

Initially consisting of a single officer, the provost marshal general (PMG) himself, eventually the bureau was authorized fourteen additional officers split between several branches. However, a mix of officers from the regulars, volunteers, and Invalid Corps were also detailed to the PMGB to fulfill a number of rolls. Each congressional district was appointed a provost marshal who served on a "board of enrollment". The board included two other persons (one of whom was to be a licensed physician) and was charged with overseeing the enrollment of men for the draft. An enrolling officer could also be appointed per subdistrict (town, township or ward) on a temporary basis, as could special agents tasked with apprehending deserters. Additionally, all provost marshals and special agents were empowered to arrest any stragglers and send them to the nearest military post. By November 1864 the PMGB (not counting the Invalid Corps) included 4,716 officers and employees.

In the aggregate, the PMGB was successful in the enrollment and maintenance of sufficient manpower for the Union army. Over one million men were brought into the Union army at a cost of $9.84 per man (versus $34.01 per man prior to the bureau's formation) and the arrest and return to duty of over 76,500 deserters. The bureau was also able to raise $26 million to fully fund its enrollment and draft duties.

Leadership

When originally created as an office of the AGD, Colonel Simeon Draper was named the Provost Marshal General, which he held from October 1862 to March 1863. However, the PMGB did not live up to expectations under Draper's leadership. When it was made an independent department he was replaced with James Barnet Fry, who served as the PMG until the bureau's dissolution.

=== Quartermaster's Department ===
The Quartermaster's Department (QMD) was the most important and extensive department of the Union army, not least because it provided transportation services to the entire army, including the other supply departments. The QMD was responsible for the procurement, storage and distribution of supplies not already covered by another supply department, including various equipage (clothing, tents, stoves, etc.), horses and mules (Cavalry Bureau), forage and fuel, and non-Ordnance vehicles including wagons, ambulances and traveling forges. Other assumed responsibilities included the acquisition, construction and maintenance of various military structures such as barracks, hospitals, wharves, storehouses, etc.; the charter, purchase and maintenance of all riverine and ocean-going vessels used by the army and the Western Gunboat Flotilla; the construction, maintenance and management of all military railroad transportation (United States Military Railroad); the construction, maintenance and management of military telegraph lines (U.S. Military Telegraph Corps); management of all wagon trains in the field; the collection and burial of the dead and maintenance of national cemeteries; and any expenses associated with army movement and operations that did not fall under another department's purview.

The QMD at the start of the war consisted of just thirty-seven officers, seven military storekeepers, and thirteen civilian clerks at the office of the Quartermaster-General (QMG), a situation which was considered understaffed even for peacetime requirements. Within a month of the conflict's start, Congress passed an act to raise the number of officers to forty-nine, and again several months later it was raised to seventy-six, adding an assistant quartermaster-general (colonel) and additional numbers of deputy quartermaster-generals (lieutenant colonel), quartermasters (major) and assistant quartermasters (captain) to support the QMG (brigadier-general). Although a substantial increase, this was not enough to meet the needs of the QMD, and so more than nine hundred assistant quartermasters of volunteers were commissioned and a large number of regular and volunteer officers were detailed to serve as acting quartermasters during the war. Congress also authorized the number of storekeepers increased to twelve and the hiring of additional clerks and other civilian workers for the office (including women), which would grow to over 200 by 1863 and close to 600 by the war's end. To this were added the many civilians working at the quartermaster depots or with quartermasters in the field. Many of these workers were rowdy and difficult to manage, especially before Congress made QMD employees subject to military law and discipline. One exception were Black workers who proved more reliable and whom Quartermaster-General Meigs considered a great aid; by 1864 the QMD was largely reliant on them to fulfill various unskilled positions.

Officers of the QMD were assigned as commanders of the various quartermaster depots or to the staff of various field units (with the exception of regiments, whose quartermaster personnel were selected from among its own officers and NCOs). Depot commanders were responsible for the acquisition, storage and distribution of supplies and the disbursement of funds for transportation and other services. Supplies could be manufactured within the depot or purchased from commercial interests, usually as part of a low-bid contract but in an emergency on the open market. In the first three years of the war depot commanders themselves were responsible for managing these contracts, but by July 1864 a more centralized system requiring approval from the QMG's office had been implemented to improve accountability. Based on unit quartermasters' requests, supplies would be shipped to advanced depots or railheads, where the unit quartermasters arraigned to have them picked up and issued to the unit.

The principal depots of the QMD were located in Cincinnati, Milwaukee, New York, Philadelphia, Quincy, Illinois, Steubenville, Ohio, St. Louis, and Washington, D.C., with other major depots located in Baltimore, Chicago, Louisville, New Orleans, and San Francisco. New York, Philadelphia, and Washington were the primary depots supporting Union armies in the eastern theater, with Cincinnati, St. Louis, and Louisville the primary support depots in the western theater. Many advanced and temporary depots were established as needed, including at Alexandria, Virginia, Fort Monroe, City Point, Virginia, and Nashville, which could become as large and busy as any general depot. However, despite these depots being responsible for thousands of soldiers and millions of dollars in supplies, many of their commanders were only captains. Congress approved in July 1864 the appointment of ten depot commanders to the rank of colonel, while other commanders either received a volunteer commission or brevet rank of brigadier general for as long as they remained at their depot.

In the early months of the conflict, the QMD struggled to clothe, equip and transport the rapidly-growing Union army, especially as fraud, war profiteering and political interference was rampant. Under the able leadership of Quartermaster-General Meigs and legislation passed by Congress, this corruption was quickly brought under control and most quartermasters (with notable exceptions such as Justus McKinstry) proved to be able and law-abiding. Undoubtedly this was due in part to the requirement that quartermasters file a bond worth $10,000 that made them personally liable for their supplies. The exception to this was when the supplies were destroyed due to natural causes or to prevent them falling into enemy hands, a situation which perversely caused celebration among some quartermasters. While there were inevitably mistakes and other mishaps, the Union army was rarely deprived of the supplies and services provided by the QMD. Although the scope and scale of the Civil War was beyond any prewar planning, the professional competence of the department allowed it to quickly meet every challenge. It also exploited emerging technologies like railroads and steamboats with expertise to support the Union army like never before at a strategic and operational level.

Of the $1.8 billion spent by the Federal government during the war, over a billion of that was distributed by the Quartermaster Department. Among the staggering number of supplies and services acquired by the QMD include approximately a million horses and half a million mules; the movement by rail of over 1.2 million troops; 590 ocean-going vessels under charter or owned outright providing over 190,000 tons of shipping, with another 599 riverine vessels; over 1.6 million tons of coal and 500,000 cords of wood; over 22 million bushels of corn, 78 million of oat, 1.5 million tons of hay and 21,000 tons of straw and other fodder; more than $23 million for the rental, construction and maintenance of army property; and over 51,000 standard army wagons and 5,300 ambulances.

Leadership

The Quartermaster General at the start of the war was Joseph E. Johnston, who resigned shortly after on April 22, 1861, to join the Confederate army. Major Ebenezer S. Sibly served as acting QMG until Montgomery C. Meigs was appointed and took up his new duties on June 13, 1861. Considered one of the most effective leaders to serve in the Union army, Meigs oversaw the expansion of the QMD to meet the demands of the war and continued to lead it well after its end. Meigs was also a hands-on manager and from August 1863 to January 1864 he was busy handling logistical matters in the western theatre. During his absence, Colonel Charles Thomas served as acting QMG in Washington.

=== Signal Corps ===
The creation of a Signal Corps for the US Army was the result of Albert James Myer, an army surgeon who had developed a system of military signals based on sign language known as wigwag. Myer was appointed to the rank of major and to lead the Signal Corps (albeit as its only officer) effective June 27, 1860. During the early years of the Civil War the Signal Corps did not have any personnel other than Myer appointed to it. Instead, officers and enlisted men were sent from other units to Fort Monroe to learn his system and in turn teach others. Myer continued to campaign for a more formal and permanent Signal Corps, which was finally granted by Congress on March 3, 1863. However, a dispute between the Signal Corps and the U.S. Military Telegraph Corps over who controlled electrical telegraphy led Secretary Stanton to replace Myer with Maj. William Nicodemus in November of that year. After an inadvertent release of confidential information, Nicodemus was in turn replaced by Colonel Bejamin Fisher, who would remain the Corps' commander until the end of the war. The Signal Corps proved instrumental in coordinating the actions of the Union army during the Civil War and afterwards Congress appointed Myers to once again lead it in 1866.

=== Subsistence Department ===
The mission of the Subsistence Department was the purchase, storage and distribution of rations and related items in a timely manner. It was the smallest of the four supply departments, and even as the army grew to encompass over a million soldiers the department itself barely expanded in size. Yet it was able to meet its mission to such an extent that President Lincoln once remarked to an officer "Your department we scarcely hear of; it is like a well-regulated stomach, works so smoothly we are not conscious of having it."

The authorized strength of the department at the war's start was a Commissary General of Subsistence (CGS) with the rank of colonel, an assistant CGS with the rank of lieutenant colonel, and ten commissaries of subsistence (CS), two with the rank of major and the rest captains. Those not assigned to work at the office of the CGS in Washington were in charge of one of the subsistence depots or purchasing offices, or assigned to the staff of one of the military departments. Although there were no enlisted personnel in the department (all commissary positions at the regimental level being fulfilled by members of the regiment), a small civilian staff of clerks and laborers was assigned to the department.

To meet the needs of feeding the rapidly-expanding Union army, Congress authorized a CS with the rank of captain to be assigned to each brigade in July 1861, and in August 1861 the department was expanded with twelve additional officers, four majors and eight captains. A year later when army corps were officially created a CS with the rank of lieutenant colonel was authorized to serve on their staff, and in February 1863 the department was further expanded when the CGS was promoted to brigadier general, a second assistant CGS was added with the rank of colonel, and two additional majors were authorized. Eventually in March 1865 Congress formally recognized wartime requirements by authorizing a chief CS with the rank of colonel for each field army, military department and division, and principle subsistence depot; an assistant CS with the rank of colonel assigned to Washington; up to six CS with the rank of lieutenant colonel to serve as inspectors or special duty assignment; a chief CS with the rank of lieutenant colonel for each army corps; and a CS with the rank of major for each division.

The need to fill CS positions among the field units primarily came from volunteer officers or regular officers detailed to the duty, and by the end of the war there were 535 commissaries of subsistence of volunteers, bringing the total complement of officers in the department to 564. Although educating them in the principles of their duty was a constant problem, it was a minor one eventually fixed with time and experience, and those who could not meet the standards of the department were relieved of duty.

During the war the principle subsistence depots and purchasing offices were located in Baltimore, Boston, Chicago, Cincinnati, Louisville, Philadelphia, St. Louis, San Francisco and Washington, D.C. Depot commissaries, assisted by civilian clerks and laborers, received purchases in bulk at these locations and repackaged them for shipment to armies in the field. The actual transportation of rations was handled by the Quartermaster Department, requiring close cooperation between the two. Major beef depots were also established in Alexandria, Virginia, Louisville and Washington. During the war the department developed a highly effective system of base, advanced, and temporary depots, and mobile beef herds which followed behind Union forces in the field.

The success of the Subsistence Department in meeting the challenges of the war was noted by Secretary Stanton, who observed in 1865 that no operation conducted by the Union army failed on account of the department being unable to meet its obligations. In total, the department purchased over $361 million in foodstuff and miscellaneous subsistence items from July 1, 1861, to June 30, 1865. The vast quantities of items managed by the department included over 504 million pounds of hardtack, 223 million pounds of bacon, 200 million pounds of brown sugar, 106 million pounds of fresh beef, 64 million pounds of roasted coffee and more than 322,000 live beef cattle.

Leadership

At the Civil War's start, the CGS was George Gibson. Gibson, who at eighty-six was the oldest serving officer in the army, had been in this position since the department was first created in April 1818 and as such was responsible for establishing its procurement and distribution methods. When he died on September 29, 1861, he was succeeded by his deputy, Joseph Pannell Taylor. Taylor oversaw the department's expansion during the most eventful years of its history and served until his death on June 29, 1864. The senior assistant CGS Amos Beebe Eaton was promoted to the position upon Taylor's death and served as CGS for the rest of the war.

== Military tactics ==
The tactics of the Union army, as with their Confederate opponents, was derived from traditions developed in Europe around the use of smoothbore muskets: soldiers marching shoulder-to-shoulder in lines, columns and other formations in order to deliver volley fire on the enemy. The most notable development though was the widespread use of rifled muskets, which had an effective range of 500 yards versus the smoothbore's 100 yards. This led to predictions the defense would have the advantage over an attacker and render such linear tactics obsolete, which many contemporaries and early historians echoed. More recently, historians have questioned this narrative and argued based on research that most combat still took place at the range of smoothbore muskets and casualty rates were little different from during the Napoleonic Wars. Instead they assert these tactics still remained relevant during the Civil War.

In the first stage of an attack, preparatory fire would be carried out by field artillery and skirmishers. When possible a flanking maneuver was preferred, but if necessary a frontal assault was conducted, with feints to draw off the enemy's attention. Successive lines of infantry would advance on the enemy at a walking pace until the first line got to within 200 yards or less, whereupon (ideally) they broke into a charge to overrun the enemy's position, stopping only once to fire a volley. If successful the first line would regroup in place as the succeeding lines pass through to attack the next position; if they became bogged down or forced to retreat, the next line would pass through to continue the attack. More likely, the attackers stopped within 100 yards of the enemy and begin exchanging fire with them until using up their ammunition and either be driven off or press home with a bayonet charge.

Fieldworks were used extensively on the defensive thanks to the teachings of Dennis Hart Mahan at West Point. Even when not conducting a siege, such defensive fortifications would be constructed if time allowed. Examples included rifle pits, abatises, wire obstacles, land mines, and palisades. Truly impressive trench systems could be constructed thanks to the widespread use of Black laborers. If field fortifications were not available, the main defensive line would be formed around a strong terrain feature (stone wall, embankment, etc.) which ideally allowed for flanking fire. Supporting lines were placed behind the main line, on a hill overlooking it if possible but otherwise providing a ready reserve. Counter-battery fire would attempt to knock out the enemy's artillery while skirmishers harassed the attacker as they advanced. Once within range, the defending infantry attempted to drive off the enemy with superior firepower or, if timed right, a counter-charge of their own.

Union cavalry were rarely used in actual battle in the first years of the war, instead being parceled out on scouting and raiding missions and often at a disadvantage against their Confederate counterparts. Under energetic commanders like Philip Sheridan however the Union cavalry grew into its own and developed tactics unique from their European counterparts. Instead of masses of heavy cavalry charging enemy infantry, a cavalry force would leave a portion of its troopers mounted while the rest dismounted to engage the enemy in a firefight. The widespread employment of repeating firearms gave Union cavalry a particular advantage, especially when utilizing marching fire. If the firefight did not achieve success, the dismounted portion could clear any obstacles to allow the mounted portion to charge with revolvers and sabers, and if not successful the force could remount and use their mobility to attack from another direction. In this way an enemy could be defeated in detail as these successive attacks forced them to spread out and allowed isolated elements to eventually be overwhelmed.

== Desertions and draft riots ==
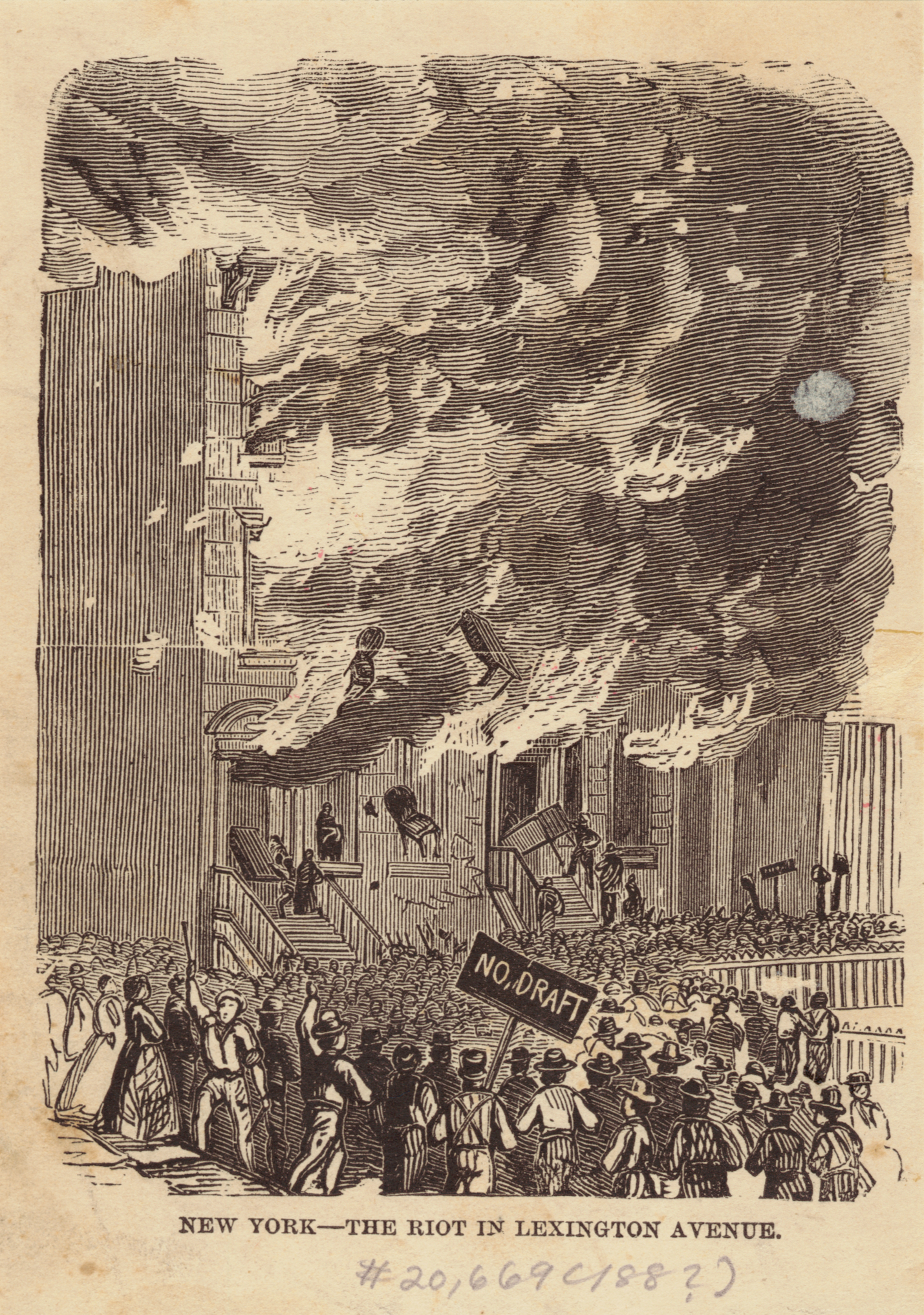
Rioters attacking a building during the New York anti-draft riots of 1863

Desertion was a major problem for both sides. The daily hardships of war, forced marches, thirst, suffocating heat, disease, delay in pay, solicitude for family, impatience at the monotony and futility of inactive service, panic on the eve of battle, the sense of war-weariness, the lack of confidence in commanders, and the discouragement of defeat (especially early on for the Union army), all tended to lower the morale of the Union army and to increase desertion.

In 1861 and 1862, the war was going badly for the Union army and there were, by some counts, 180,000 desertions. In 1863 and 1864, the bitterest two years of the war, the Union army suffered over 200 desertions every day, for a total of 150,000 desertions during those two years. This puts the total number of desertions from the Union army during the four years of the war at nearly 350,000. Using these numbers, 15% of Union soldiers deserted during the war. Official numbers put the number of deserters from the Union army at 200,000 for the entire war, or about 8% of Union army soldiers. Since desertion is defined as being AWOL for 30 or more days and some soldiers returned within that time period, as well as some deserters being labeled missing-in-action or vice versa, accurate counts are difficult to determine. Many historians estimate the "real" desertion rate in the Union army as between 9–12%. About 1 out of 3 deserters returned to their regiments, either voluntarily or after being arrested and being sent back. Many deserters were professional "bounty jumpers" who would enlist to collect the cash bonus and then desert to do the same elsewhere. If not caught and executed, this crime could pay well. While 147 deserters are known to have been executed by the Union Army during the Civil War, the majority sentenced to death were in fact reprieved including through the intervention of President Lincoln.

Irish immigrants were the main participants in the famous "New York Draft riots" of 1863. Stirred up by the instigating rhetoric of Democratic politicians, the Irish had shown the strongest support for Southern aims prior to the start of the war and had long opposed abolitionism and the free black population, regarding them as competition for jobs and blaming them for driving down wages. Alleging that the war was merely an upper-class abolitionist war to free slaves who might move north and compete for jobs and housing, the poorer classes did not welcome a draft, especially one from which a richer man could buy an exemption. The poor formed clubs that would buy exemptions for their unlucky members. As a result of the Enrollment Act, rioting began in several Northern cities, the most heavily hit being New York City. A mob reported as consisting principally of Irish immigrants rioted in the summer of 1863, with the worst violence occurring in July during the Battle of Gettysburg. The mob set fire to African American churches and the Colored Orphan Asylum as well as the homes of prominent Protestant abolitionists. A mob was reportedly repulsed from the offices of the staunchly pro-Union New York Tribune by workers firing two Gatling guns. The principal victims of the rioting were African Americans and activists in the anti-slavery movement. Not until victory was achieved at Gettysburg could the Union army be sent in; some units had to open fire to quell the violence and stop the rioters. Casualties were estimated as up to 1,000 killed or wounded. There were a few small scale draft riots in rural areas of the Midwest and in the coal regions of Pennsylvania.

== See also ==
- Grand Army of the Republic
- American Civil War Corps Badges
- Commemoration of the American Civil War
- Irish Americans in the American Civil War
- German Americans in the American Civil War
- Hispanics in the American Civil War
- Italian Americans in the Civil War
- Native Americans in the American Civil War
- Military history of African Americans
- Uniform of the Union army
- United States National Cemeteries
- National Union Party, the temporary party that Lincoln led to victory in the 1864 election
- Army of the Frontier
- Army of the Southwest
- I Corps
- II Corps
- III Corps
- IV Corps
- V Corps
- VI Corps
- VII Corps
- VIII Corps
- IX Corps
- X Corps
- XI Corps
- XII Corps
- XIII Corps
- XIV Corps
- XV Corps
- XVI Corps
- XVII Corps
- XVIII Corps
- XIX Corps
- XX Corps
- XXI Corps
- XXII Corps
- XXIII Corps
- XXIV Corps
- XXV Corps
- Cavalry Corps
