= Carbine (disambiguation) =

A carbine is a long arm firearm with a shortened barrel.

The word may also refer to:

- John Carbine (1855–1915), American baseball player
- Martha Vist Carbine, a character in the Japanese novel series Mobile Suit Gundam Unicorn
- Carbine (horse) (1885–1914), a champion New Zealand-bred Thoroughbred racehorse
- Carbine Studios, a videogame developer

== See also ==
- Carbine affair, a joint German/American law enforcement operation
- Carbine Club Stakes (ATC), a race named in honor of the racehorse
- VRC Carbine Club Stakes, a second race named after the horse
- Elaine Carbines, Australian politician
