= Alexander Brydie Dyer =

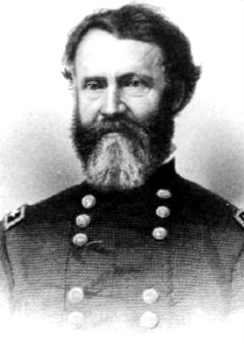
- Alexander B. Dyer

Chief of Ordnance of the U.S. Army
- In office September 12, 1864 – May 20, 1874
- Preceded by: George D. Ramsay
- Succeeded by: Stephen Vincent Benet

Personal details
- Born: January 10, 1815 Richmond, Virginia, US
- Died: May 20, 1874 (aged 59) Washington, D.C., US
- Resting place: Arlington National Cemetery
- Education: U.S. Military Academy

Military service
- Allegiance: United States
- Branch/service: United States Army
- Years of service: 1837–1874
- Rank: Brigadier General; Brevet Major General
- Commands: U.S. Army Ordnance Corps; Springfield Armory; Fort Monroe Arsenal; Little Rock Arsenal; Fayetteville Arsenal
- Battles/wars: Seminole Wars; Mexican–American War; American Civil War

Alexander Brydie Dyer (January 10, 1815 – May 20, 1874) was an American soldier in a variety of 19th century wars, serving most notably as a general and the Army's Chief of Ordnance for the U.S. Army Ordnance Corps during the American Civil War.

== Early life ==
Dyer was born at Richmond, Virginia, on January 10, 1815. He was the son of William Hay Dyer (1788–1862) and Margaret (née Brydie) Dyer (1796–1888), who later moved their family to Missouri.

Dyer graduated from the United States Military Academy in 1837 as 6th out of 50 cadets.

== Career ==
He served in the Seminole Wars 1837–38 in the 3rd US Artillery and as Lieutenant in the Ordnance Corps.

In the Mexican–American War in 1846–48, he was brevetted Captain for gallant conduct at the Battle of Santa Cruz de Rosales. He was promoted to full Captain in the Ordnance Department on March 3, 1853. Between the wars, Dyer commanded Fayetteville Arsenal (1851–1853), Little Rock Arsenal (1853–1855), and Fort Monroe Arsenal (1855–1861). He became a member of the Ordnance Board in 1859.

When the Civil War erupted Dyer stayed with the Union, and in August 1861 he was given command of the Springfield Armory in Springfield, Massachusetts, where his expansions and enlargement of operations gained notice. During his tenure at Springfield, Dyer was responsible for expanding the output of small arms for the Union Army. Doubts about the wisdom of placing a southerner in such a position of responsibility were rapidly dispelled as Dyer upgraded production with energy and dispatch. In 1862, Dyer was approached by his superiors concerning the possibility of his supplanting General Ripley as Chief of Ordnance, but he declined to take the assignment because he had great respect for his chief, and because he was in the middle of a major upgrading of weapons production at Springfield Armory.

On the retirement of General Ramsey, the previous Chief of Ordnance, on September 12, 1864, he was advanced three ranks and appointed as the 7th Chief of Ordnance of the United States Army with the rank of Brigadier General. On December 12, 1864, President Lincoln submitted his nomination to brevet Major General to the U.S. Senate, which confirmed the appointment on February 23, 1865.

During his ten years in the office, Dyer had to contend with the demands of inventors and unscrupulous contractors, who ultimately took their various complaints to Congress. Seeking to clear his name, Dyer asked for a court-martial. Failing in this, he requested a court of inquiry, which proved to be protracted and exhaustive. He was not only exonerated, but was declared to be an exemplary officer, worthy of emulation by all Army officers.

Dyer is known as being the first commander committed to the purchasing of a Gatling gun, one of the first designs of a machine gun. He is also known as the creator of the Dyer Shell, an artillery projectile for the 3-inch ordnance rifle, a principal artillery piece by the end of the Civil War.

After the war Dyer stayed in the army and continued his service as head of the Ordnance Department until his death.

== Personal life ==
Dyer was married to Elizabeth Beersheba Allen (1823–1891). Together, they were the parents of six children. Of note is his son, Colonel Alexander Brydie Dyer Jr. (1852–1920), West Point class of 1873; as the author of the Handbook for Light Artillery.

Dyer died on May 20, 1874, in Washington, D.C. He was buried in Oak Hill Cemetery. Dyer was reinterred at Arlington National Cemetery along with his wife on November 30, 1910.

== See also ==
- List of American Civil War generals (Union)

== Notes ==
Military offices
Preceded by Brigadier General George D. Ramsey	Chief of Ordnance of the United States Army; 1864–1874	Succeeded by Brigadier General Stephen Vincent Benet
