= Lorenzo Thomas =

American politician and army officer (1804–1875)

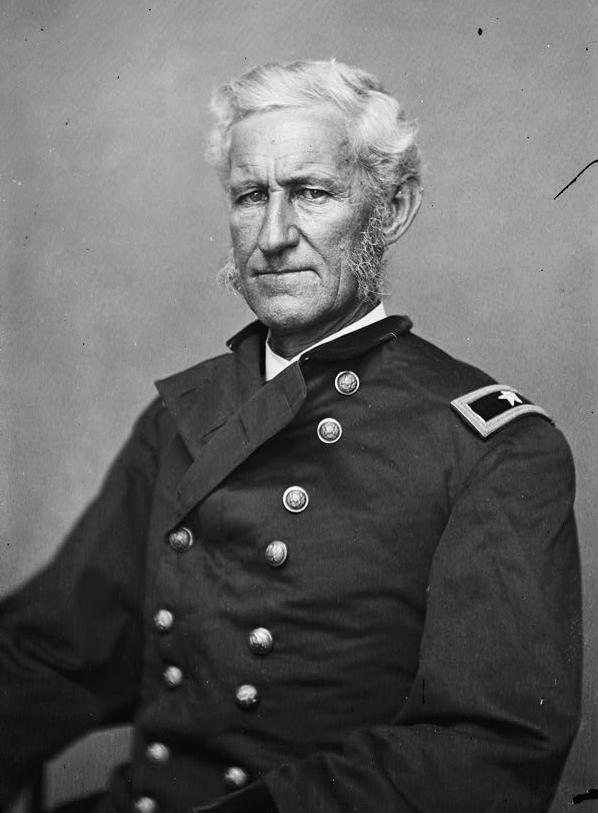
- Thomas c. 1860–1870

Adjutant General of the U.S. Army
- In office March 7, 1861 – February 22, 1869
- President: Abraham Lincoln; Andrew Johnson
- Preceded by: Samuel Cooper
- Succeeded by: Edward D. Townsend

Personal details
- Born: October 26, 1804 New Castle, Delaware, U.S.
- Died: March 2, 1875 (aged 70) Washington, D.C., U.S.
- Resting place: Oak Hill Cemetery
- Education: United States Military Academy

Military service
- Allegiance: United States • Union
- Branch/service: United States Army • Union Army
- Years of service: 1823–1869
- Rank: Brigadier General; Brevet Major General
- Battles/wars: Seminole Wars; Mexican-American War; Battle of Monterrey; American Civil War

Lorenzo Thomas (October 26, 1804 – March 2, 1875) was an American officer in the United States Army who was Adjutant General of the Army at the beginning of the American Civil War. After the war, he was appointed temporary Secretary of War by U.S. President Andrew Johnson, precipitating Johnson's impeachment.

== Early life ==
Thomas was born in New Castle, Delaware. He graduated from the United States Military Academy in 1823, and was commissioned a second lieutenant in the 4th U.S. Infantry. He fought in the Seminole War in Florida and, during the Mexican–American War, he was the chief of staff to General William O. Butler. He received a brevet promotion to lieutenant colonel for Monterrey, which was made permanent in 1852. From 1853 to 1861, he served as chief of staff to the commanding general of the U.S. Army, Winfield Scott.

== Civil War ==
Just before the start of the Civil War, Thomas was promoted to colonel and adjutant general of the U.S. Army on March 7, 1861. On August 10, 1861, President Abraham Lincoln appointed Thomas a brigadier general in the Regular Army, to rank from August 3, 1861, the date Lincoln sent the nomination to the U.S. Senate for confirmation. The Senate confirmed the appointment on August 5, 1861. Camp Thomas, a Regular Army training base in Columbus, Ohio, was named in his honor in July 1861. He held the position of adjutant general until he retired in 1869, except for a special assignment to recruit African-American troops in the Military Division of the Mississippi from 1863 to 1865.

Thomas did not get along well with Secretary of War Edwin M. Stanton and this assignment outside of Washington, D.C., was considered a form of banishment. Many historians have claimed Thomas was banished in disgrace after conspiring to defame Union General William T. Sherman as insane. Thomas was replaced by Brig. Gen. Edward D. Townsend as Adjutant General, who would serve until 1880.

On April 6, 1863, General Thomas was sent by the War Department to Helena, Arkansas to recruit freedmen into the U.S. Army. He created the first black troop in Arkansas, fighting for Union side as part of Bureau of Colored Troops, which was created by the War Department on May 22, 1863.

On March 8, 1866, U.S. President Andrew Johnson nominated Thomas to the grade of brevet major general in the Regular Army, and the Senate confirmed the appointment on July 14, 1866.

== Postbellum career ==
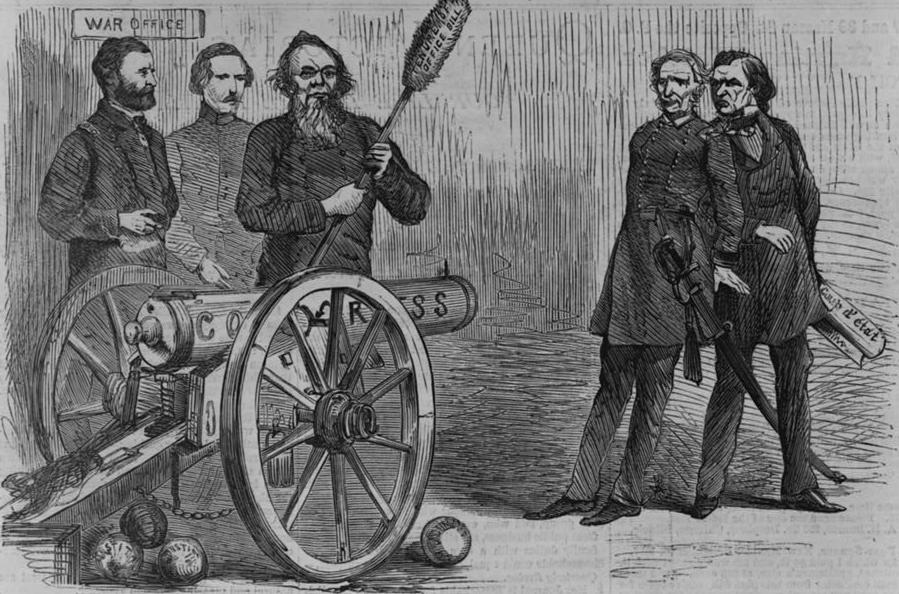
The Situation A Harper's Weekly cartoon gives a humorous breakdown of "the situation". Secretary of War Edwin Stanton aims a cannon labeled "Congress" on the side at Thomas and President Andrew Johnson to show how he was using Congress to defeat the president and his unsuccessful replacement. He also holds a rammer marked "Tenure of Office Bill" and cannonballs on the floor are marked "Justice". Ulysses S. Grant and an unidentified man stand to Stanton's left.

On February 21, 1868, President Johnson attempted to replace Stanton by appointing Thomas as Secretary of War ad interim. Thomas, still stinging from his bad treatment by Stanton, boasted of his ability and determination to oust him from office by force, if necessary. Some historians believe that it was this attitude in his testimony at Johnson's impeachment trial in the Senate that was partially responsible for Johnson's acquittal. Thomas retired from the Army on February 22, 1869, ten days before Johnson left office. He died in Washington, D.C. He is buried in Oak Hill Cemetery, Georgetown.

Fort Thomas, a military post established in Arizona Territory in 1876, was named for Thomas.

== See also ==
- List of American Civil War generals (Union)

Military offices
Preceded by Samuel Cooper	Adjutant General of the U.S. Army; 1861–1869	Succeeded by Edward D. Townsend
