= Hall Carbine Affair =

Profiteering scandal in the US Civil War

During the American Civil War, John Pierpont Morgan financed the purchase of 5,000 surplus rifles at $3.50 each, which were then sold back to the government for $22 each. The incident became renowned as a scandalous example of wartime profiteering. Interest in the incident was revived in 1910 as an indictment of Morgan.^{[2]}

== The Affair ==
The weapons, known as "Hall's Carbines", were purchased by arms dealer Arthur M. Eastman in a deal negotiated with James Wolfe Ripley, Brigadier General and head of the US Ordinance Bureau, in June 1861. Subsequently, Eastman agreed to sell the weapons to Simon Stevens for $12.50 each, if Stevens would provide financing in the amount of $20,000 to allow Eastman to complete the purchase from the government. Stevens quickly negotiated a sale to field general John C. Frémont for $22, promising to bore out the rifles to fifty-eight caliber. With the deal completed, Stevens obtained a loan of $20,000 from Morgan. The weapons were delivered to Eastman in August 1861, refurbished at a cost of approximately 75 cents each, and 2500 arms were delivered to Fremont by the end of August. Meanwhile, Stevens obtained a loan of $46,226.31 from another banker, Morris Ketchum, of which $37,500 were used to repay Eastman. Morgan was still owed $20,000, and was holding 2500 rifles as collateral. On Sept. 14, 1861, the US government paid for the first shipment, and Morgan released the remaining rifles for shipment to Fremont. A voucher in lieu of payment for the remaining funds due was sent to Morgan, who forwarded it to Ketchum.

== Reaction and evaluation ==
By the time the second payment was due to be paid in September 1861, a scandal was developing. Ripley discovered that Fremont had purchased the rifles without his authorization, and he felt that Fremont had been overcharged. Ripley complained to the Secretary of War, and the matter was reported in major newspapers on September 26, 1861. By the next day, a House investigating committee was looking into the matter. In 1863, a Congressional Committee on Government Contracts was highly critical of the arms merchants, writing: "Worse than traitors in arms are the men who pretending loyalty to the flag, feast and fatten on the misfortunes of the nation, while patriot blood is crimsoning the plains of the South and bodies of their countrymen are moldering in the dust."

Interest in the affair was rekindled in 1910 with the publication of Gustavus Myers' History of the Great American Fortunes, which included a chapter on J. P. Morgan. The matter then became a cause célèbre, attracting a wide range of commentary. Myers said that the rifles were more likely to blow the rifleman's thumb off than they were to cause any damage to the enemy. An earlier version of the rifle was known to be subject to this problem. Gordon Wasson argued that there was no evidence Morgan knew that he was participating in a scheme to profit from the chaotic situation at the onset of the Civil War. However, Matthew Josephson had earlier asserted that Morgan certainly did know, because he had presented the government with a bill for $58,175 before he delivered the remaining rifles that were being held as collateral. Reviewing the evidence, Charles Morris concluded that it was "implausible" that Morgan did not know about the profitability of the endeavor. Jan Irvin pointed out that Gordon Wasson became vice president for public relations for J. P. Morgan after completing his book, which attempted to exonerate Morgan. As early as 1937, Wasson had been working to influence historians Allan Nevins and Charles McLean Andrews regarding Morgan's role in the affair, and then he used Nevins's report as a reference for his own book on the topic. John Steinbeck made reference to the affair in his novel The Winter of Our Discontent, first published in 1961, as evidence of the transgressions of ethical standards in the accumulation of J.P. Morgan's wealth.

== See also ==
- M1819 Hall rifle
- Carbine affair
