= George D. Ramsay =

US Army Brigadier General

George Douglas Ramsay
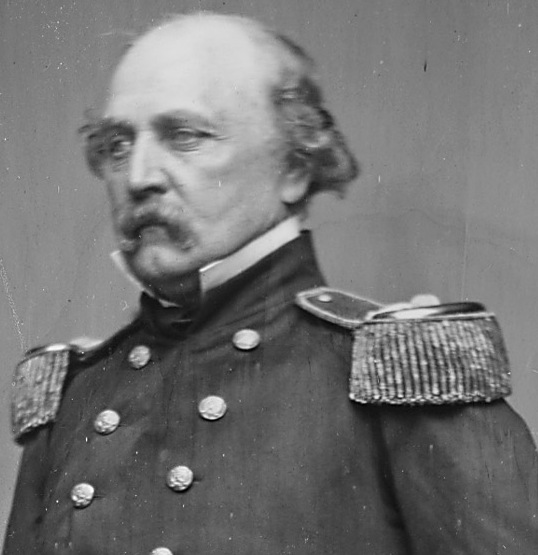
- Portrait of Ramsay
- Born: February 21, 1802; Dumfries, Virginia, U.S.
- Died: May 23, 1882 (aged 80); Washington D.C., U.S.
- Burial place: Oak Hill Cemetery; Washington, D.C., U.S.
- Military career
- Allegiance: United States of America
- Branch: United States Army
- Service years: 1820–1864
- Rank: Brigadier General; Brevet Major General
- Unit: 1st U.S. Artillery Regiment
- Commands: Chief of Ordnance, Army of Occupation; Chief of Ordnance of the U.S. Army
- Conflicts: Mexican–American War; Battle of Monterrey; American Civil War

George Douglas Ramsay (21 February 1802 – 23 May 1882) was a Brigadier General in the United States Army and served as the 6th Chief of Ordnance of the U.S. Army.

== Early life ==
George Douglas Ramsay was born in Dumfries, Virginia, on 21 February 1802, the son of a Scottish merchant who had been in business in Alexandria, Virginia, for some time. The family subsequently moved the short distance into Washington, D.C., and George entered the Military Academy in 1814 at the unusually early age of 12. He graduated six years later as the 26th man in the 31 man Class of 1820.

== Military career ==
Commissioned in the Corps of Light Artillery, he was assigned to the 1st U.S. Artillery Regiment in 1821 when that branch was reorganized into regiments. He served in various garrisons in New England and at Fort Monroe, Virginia, and on assignment with the Corps of Topographical Engineers. He was promoted first lieutenant in 1826 and became the adjutant of his regiment in 1833.

In February 1835, Ramsay was promoted captain, in which grade he was to serve for 26 years while commanding several arsenals and during his subsequent service in the Mexican–American War. He won a brevet majority for gallantry in the Mexican War and served as Chief Ordnance Officer of the Army of Occupation commanded by Major General Zachary Taylor. He returned to peacetime responsibilities as the commandant of several arsenals until assigned to serve on the Ordnance Board on the eve of the Civil War. With the coming of that conflict, his rise, heretofore glacial, was relatively meteoric. He was made a major in April 1861, a lieutenant colonel in August of that same year, and a colonel in June 1863.

When in September 1863, Ramsey was named to replace Brigadier General James Ripley as Chief of Ordnance, he was serving as Commandant of the Washington Arsenal. A friend of President Lincoln's, he was selected for his new post over the objections of Secretary of War Edwin M. Stanton, who had previously been irritated by Ramsay's independence, and who preferred the appointment of Captain George T. Balch. A compromise was reached, though without Ramsay's knowledge. He was promoted to brigadier general and Chief of Ordnance, but Balch was given substantive charge of the Office, Chief of Ordnance. This increasingly unhappy arrangement continued for a year, during which time the policies of Ramsay's predecessor were followed virtually without alteration.

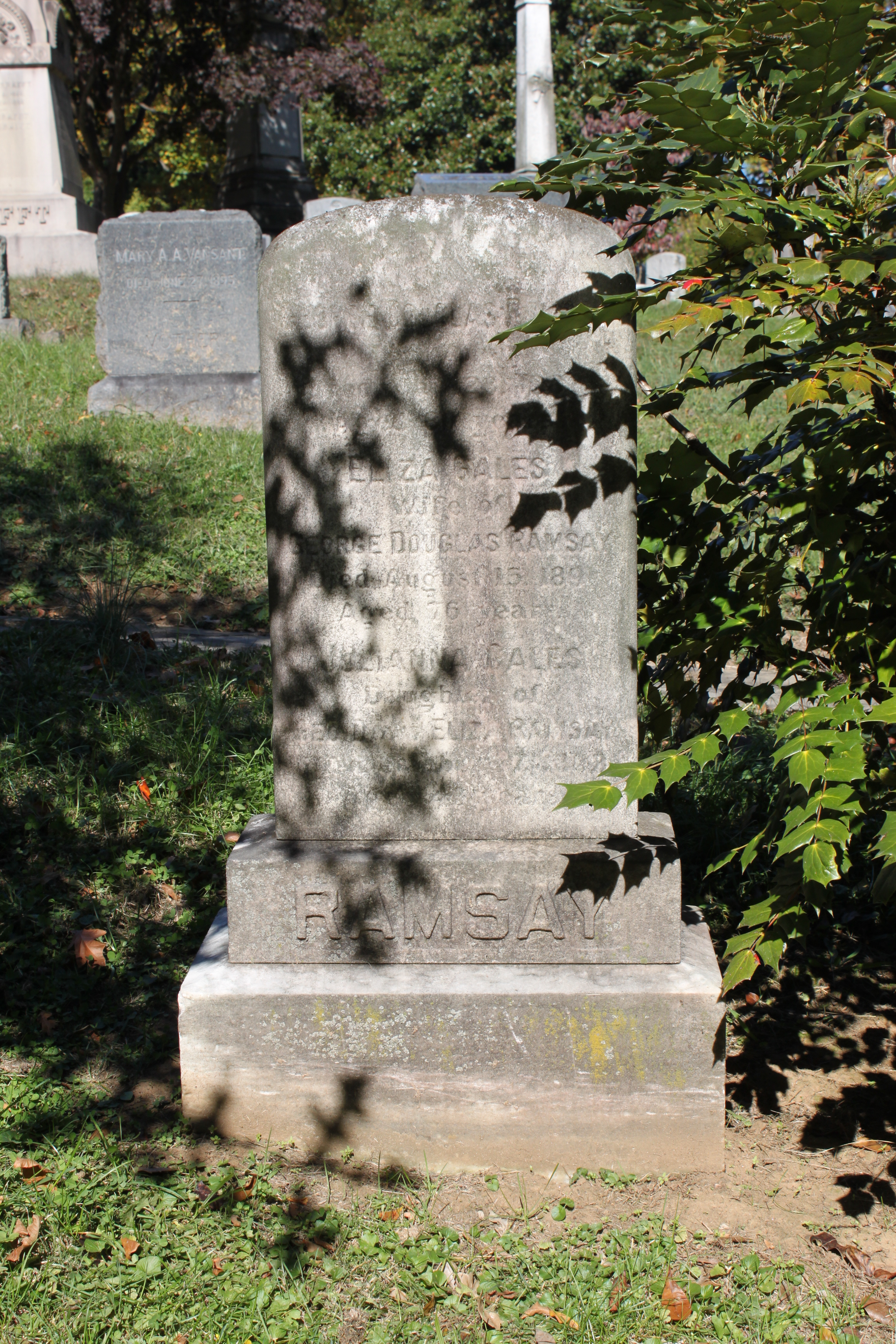
Grave of Ramsay at Oak Hill Cemetery

Ramsay was a pleasant person, hopeful of providing satisfaction to his superiors and not unreceptive to new ideas in the weapons field. His tenure, however, was too short, and he could take little decisive action in this area. Emphasis continued to be placed on seeing to it that adequate supplies reached the soldier on the fighting front. Following continuing difficulties with Secretary Stanton and Capt. Balch, Ramsay was relieved of his post in September, 1864. He then was made Inspector of Arsenals, a post he held until June 1866. (Captain Balch was soon transferred to West Point as an instructor in ordnance, and resigned from the service as a brevet lieutenant colonel in 1865.) Ramsay's last assignment was as commander of the Washington Arsenal, from which post he retired in February 1870, at the age of 68. In 1865, he was brevetted a major general for long and faithful service to the Army. Following his retirement, he lived in Washington, and died there at age 80 on 23 May 1882. He was interred at Oak Hill Cemetery in Washington, D.C.

== Dates of rank ==
- Second Lieutenant, Light Artillery, July 1, 1820
- Second Lieutenant, 1st Artillery, June 1, 1821
- First Lieutenant, 1st Artillery, March 1, 1826
- Captain, Ordnance, February 25, 1835
- Brevet Major, Sep. 23, 1846, for "Gallant and Meritorious Conduct in the Several Conflicts at Monterey"
- Major, Ordnance, Apr. 22, 1861
- Lieutenant Colonel, Ordnance, Aug. 3, 1861
- Colonel, Ordnance, June 1, 1863
- Brigadier General, and Chief of Ordnance of the U. S. Army, September 15, 1863
- Retired from Active Service, September 12, 1864
- Brevet Major-General, U. S. Army, Mar. 13, 1865

== See also ==
- List of American Civil War generals (Union)

Military offices
Preceded by Brigadier General James W. Ripley	Chief of Ordnance of the United States Army; 1863–1864	Succeeded by Brigadier General Alexander B. Dyer
