= Carbine affair =

The Carbine affair, also known as the Carbine wives affair, was a joint sting operation between German authorities and their U.S. counterparts in the FBI.

On March 10, 1992, in Frankfurt am Main eight people suspected of selling illegal weapons to Middle East countries, including Iraq, were arrested. The alleged $96-million deal included 4,000 grenade launchers, 1,000 portable anti-aircraft missiles, and 73,000 assault rifles to be provided to insurgents. Two American and six Polish nationals were extradited to the US and tried in the U.S. District in Brooklyn court. All six of the Polish suspects were notable officials in the former People's Republic of Poland – Jerzy Napiórkowski, deputy minister of finance in the last Polish Communist government; Wojciech Barański, former deputy chief of staff in the Polish army; Jan Górecki, a former Polish diplomat in Washington; Zbigniew Grabowski, former director of the Polish technology office; Jerzy Brzostek, former deputy minister of the Polish Housing Ministry; and Rajmund Szwonder, general manager of the Łucznik armament factory in Radom, Poland.

Due to friendly relationship between the US and Poland and to diplomacy by then Polish president Lech Wałęsa, the suspects were offered a deal which would see them repatriated to Poland in return for guilty pleas. They all rejected the deal, following the advice of their attorney Alan Drezin, and of the wives of three them, who had traveled to Brooklyn to plead the innocence of their husbands. A not guilty verdict was returned at the trial.

The US government paid restitution.

== See also ==
Hall Carbine Affair
