= Edward D. Townsend =

United States Army general (1817–1893)

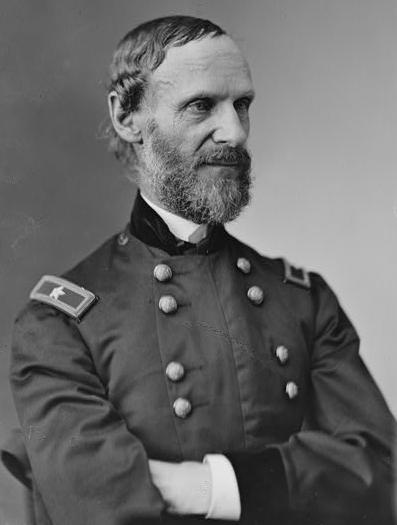
- Townsend, 1865–80
- Born: August 22, 1817; Boston, Massachusetts, U.S.
- Died: May 10, 1893 (aged 75); Washington, D.C., U.S.
- Burial place: Rock Creek Cemetery; Washington, D.C., U.S.
- Relatives: Elbridge Gerry (grandfather)
- Military career
- Allegiance: United States of America
- Branch: United States Army
- Service years: 1837–1880
- Rank: Brigadier General; Brevet Major General
- Commands: Adjutant General of the U.S. Army
- Conflicts: Second Seminole War; American Civil War; American Indian Wars

Edward Davis Townsend (August 22, 1817 – May 10, 1893) was an American military officer who was Adjutant General of the United States Army from 1869 to 1880. In 1861, then-Lieutenant Colonel Townsend was the first to propose the idea for the Medal of Honor.

== Biography ==
Edward D. Townsend was born on August 22, 1817, in Boston, Massachusetts.

The son of David S. & Eliza (Gerry) Townsend and grandson of Vice President and Founding Father Elbridge Gerry, Townsend was educated at Boston's Latin School before graduating from the United States Military Academy in 1837.

He was commissioned a second lieutenant in the Second U. S. Artillery and served as that regiment's adjutant and participated in the Second Seminole War and the relocation of the Cherokee Nation. In 1846, he was transferred to the Adjutant General's Corps and assigned to duty in Washington, D.C. He served on the Pacific coast from 1851 to 1856, after which he returned to Washington for the remainder of his career. In February 1869, he was promoted to brigadier general and became adjutant general.

Townsend retired in 1880. He died in Washington in 1893 after an accidental shock from a cable car and is buried at Rock Creek Cemetery in Washington, D.C.

== See also ==
- List of Adjutants General of the U.S. Army
- List of Massachusetts generals in the American Civil War

Military offices
Preceded by Lorenzo Thomas	Adjutant Generals of the U. S. Army; February 22, 1869-June 15, 1880	Succeeded by Richard C. Drum
