= James Wolfe Ripley =

American Union Army general (1794–1870)

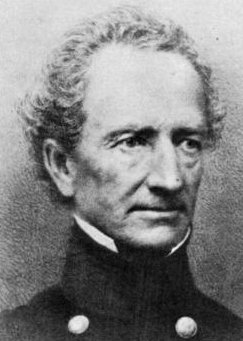
- Born: December 10, 1794; Windham County, Connecticut, U.S.
- Died: March 16, 1870 (aged 75); Hartford, Connecticut, U.S.
- Burial place: Springfield Cemetery in Springfield, Massachusetts
- Military career
- Allegiance: United States; Union
- Branch: United States Army; Union Army
- Service years: 1814–1863
- Rank: Brigadier General; Brevet Major General
- Commands: 5th Chief of Ordnance (1861–1863)
- Conflicts: War of 1812; First Seminole War; Nullification Crisis; American Civil War

James Wolfe Ripley (December 10, 1794 – March 16, 1870) was an American soldier who served as a brigadier general in the Union Army during the Civil War. In 1861, he was selected to be the 5th Chief of Ordnance for the United States Army Ordnance Department. In the early days of the war, he was instrumental in rifling and modernizing the artillery's ordnance. Additionally, Ripley also delayed the introduction of repeating firearms, particularly the Gatling gun and the Spencer rifle, into U.S. arsenals, an act that has been widely criticized by later historians.

== Biography ==
Ripley was born in Windham County, Connecticut. He graduated at West Point in 1814, was commissioned second lieutenant of artillery, and took part in the defense of Sacketts Harbor. In 1817–18 he served under Jackson during the Seminole War and the invasion of Florida as a first lieutenant. He was promoted to captain in 1825.

In 1832–1833, Ripley commanded the Federal forces in Charleston harbor at the time of the nullification movement in South Carolina. He was promoted to major of ordnance in 1838. He commanded the Kennebec Arsenal between 1833 and 1842.

He then became superintendent of the Springfield Armory (1842–1854), regarded by some historians as "Ripley's Monument." Here he improved the buildings and grounds, increased production while reducing costs, and was instrumental in developing the 1855 model .58 caliber rifled musket which was later to be the principal weapon for Union infantrymen during the Civil War. He was unpopular in some quarters because of his insistence that Army regulations be followed and abuses in the workplace be curbed, but he received consistent support from his superiors because of his outstanding accomplishments.

In 1854 he was transferred to the Watertown Arsenal as commandant of the facility, with the rank of lieutenant colonel. Then he was chief of ordnance of the Pacific Coast Department and inspector of arsenals.

With the outbreak of the Civil War in early 1861, Ripley was promoted to colonel (April) and brigadier general (August) and appointed as the 5th Chief of Ordnance of the United States Army. As the Federal forces then had no heavy rifled cannon, he immediately ordered the conversion of old smoothbores and the manufacture of Parrott guns, which were cheaper than producing new smoothbore bronze guns. He also ordered the sale of 5,000 old Hall's carbine rifles, which were later resold at a tremendous profit to John C. Frémont, much to Ripley's consternation.

At the same time, Ripley refused to authorize the purchase of additional stocks of rifle-muskets for infantry use. The decision was based on the large existing stocks of smoothbore muskets in U.S. arsenals, which he argued could be re-rifled in the same manner as the James rifles. He also adamantly opposed the introduction of breech-loading repeating rifles, on the basis that they would encourage poor fire discipline and waste ammunition.

Many historians have since decried this decision, arguing the lack of modern arms on the Union side, at a time when the Confederates were buying them in large numbers from France and the United Kingdom, lengthened the conflict by as much as two years. Others, however, counter that given the poor logistics of the Union armies at the outbreak of the war, the increased supply train needed to maintain the improved rates of fire would have bogged down the armies and made maneuver impossible (a situation which did indeed later contribute to the development of trench warfare in World War I). It is also argued that fouling due to black powder residue would have made it impossible to maintain such high rates of fire under field conditions with the rifles of the time. Individual units later purchased such weapons privately, and they were used to considerable effect; these units are not known to have had any trouble maintaining their ammunition supplies. Ripley was replaced as head of the Ordnance Department on September 15, 1863, principally because of his continuing opposition to the introduction of breech loading rifles, in disobedience to his orders from President Lincoln. Thereafter, the US Government would standard-issue Spencer rifles and carbines to a number of units, mainly cavalry with total orders reaching 106,667 rifles and carbines with the last deliveries reaching into 1866.

From September 15, 1863, to the year of his death, he was inspector of fortifications on the New England coast, having retired from active service. On March 8, 1866, President Andrew Johnson nominated Ripley to the grade of brevet major general in the regular army, to rank from March 13, 1865, and the U.S. Senate confirmed the appointment on July 14, 1866. James Wolfe Ripley died on March 16, 1870, in Hartford, Connecticut. He is buried in Springfield, Massachusetts.

His nephew, Roswell S. Ripley, was a Confederate brigadier general during the Civil War.

== See also ==
- List of American Civil War generals (Union)

== Notes ==
Military offices
Preceded by Colonel Henry K. Craig	Chief of Ordnance of the United States Army; 1861–1863	Succeeded by Brigadier General George D. Ramsay
