= List of people from Washington, D.C. =

Flag of Washington, D.C.

This is a list of prominent people who were born in, lived in, or are otherwise closely associated with Washington, D.C., and its surrounding metropolitan area, which includes portions of Maryland and Virginia.

== Actors ==
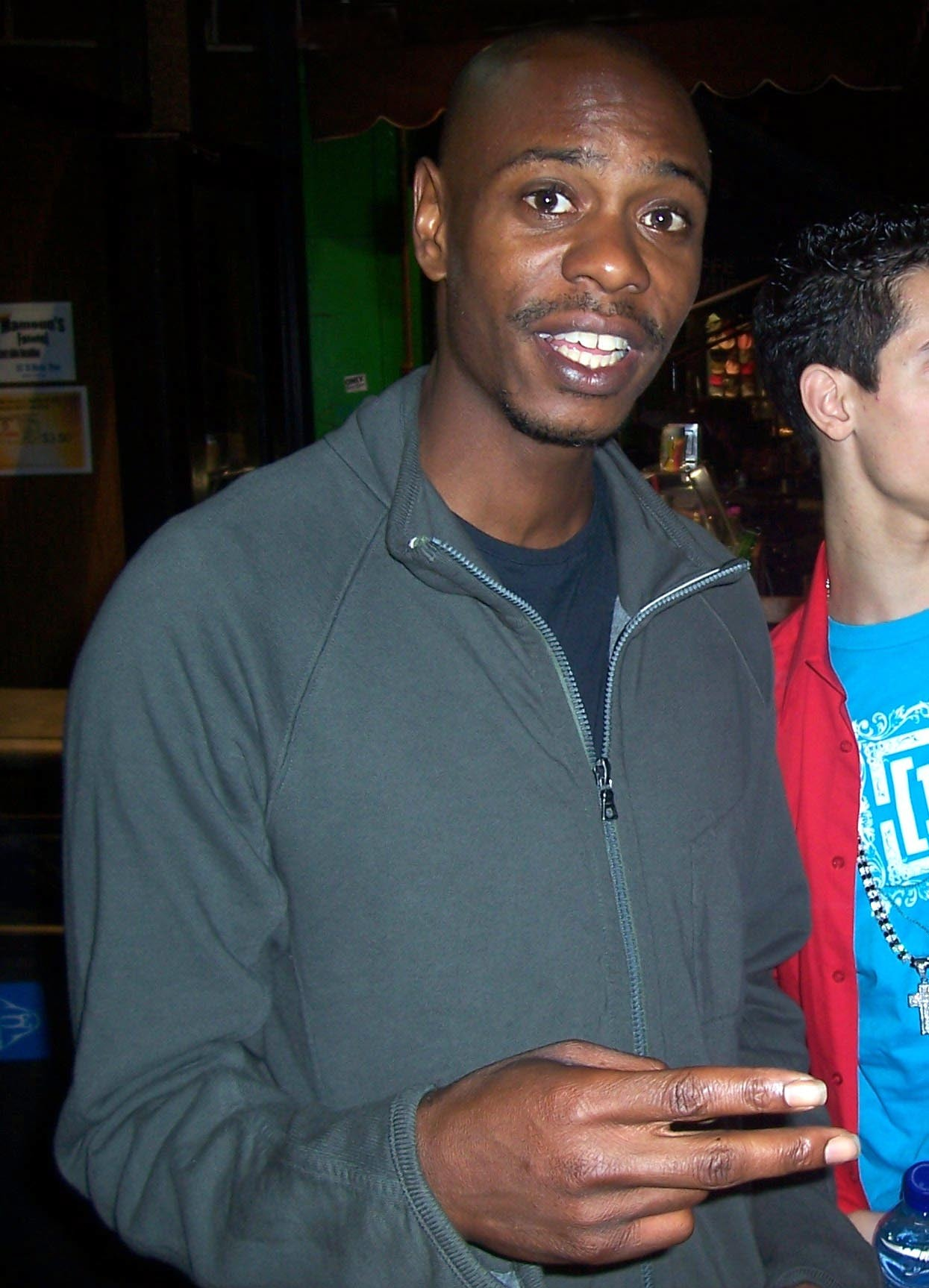
Dave Chappelle

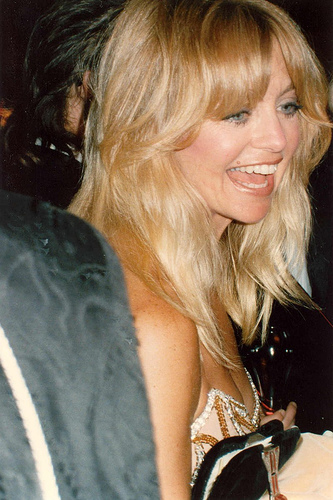
Goldie Hawn

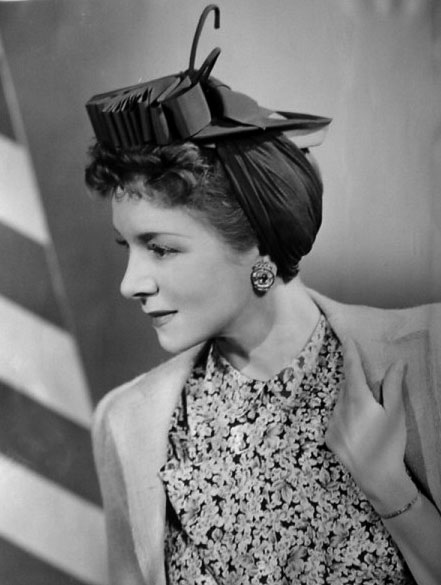
Helen Hayes

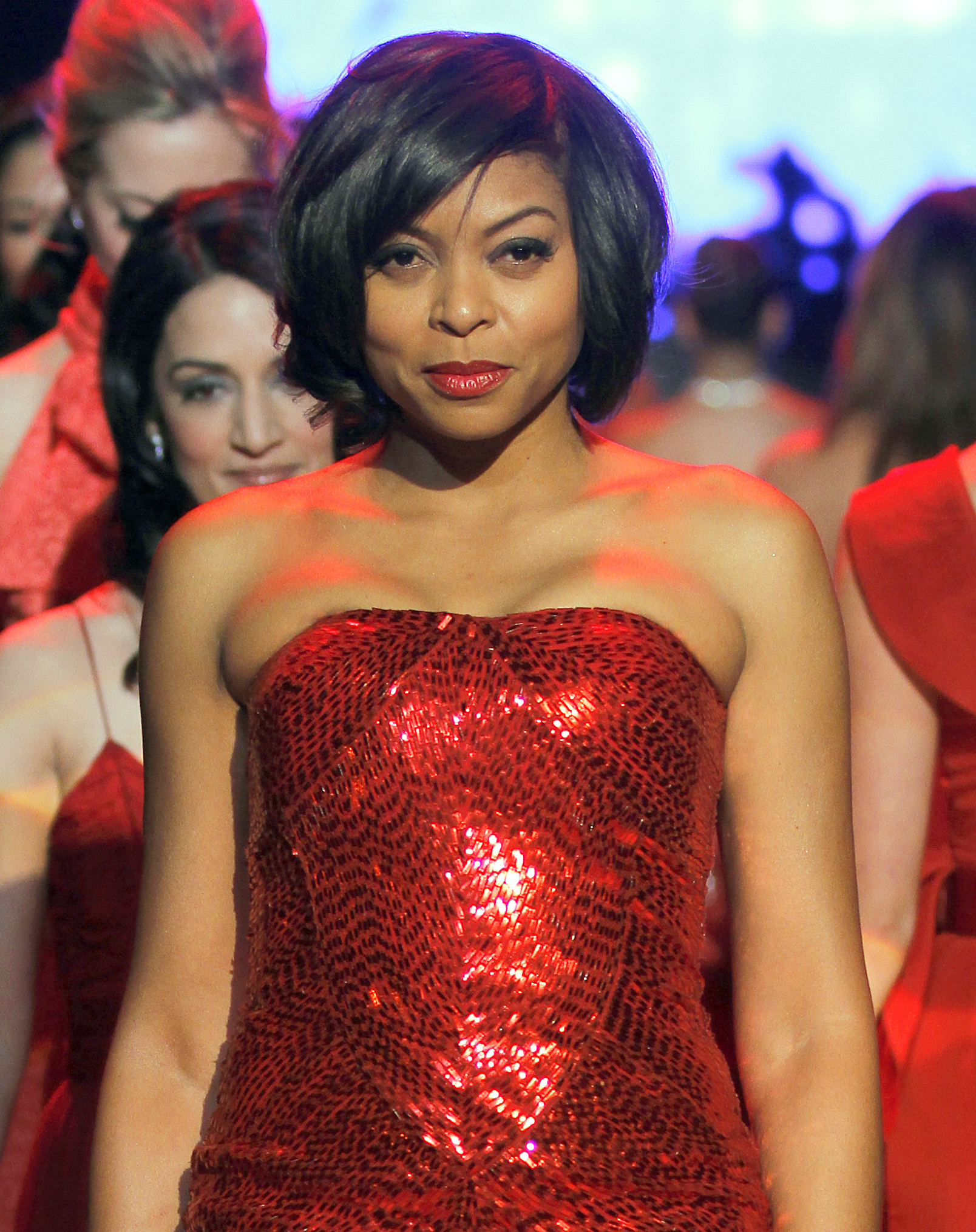
Taraji P. Henson

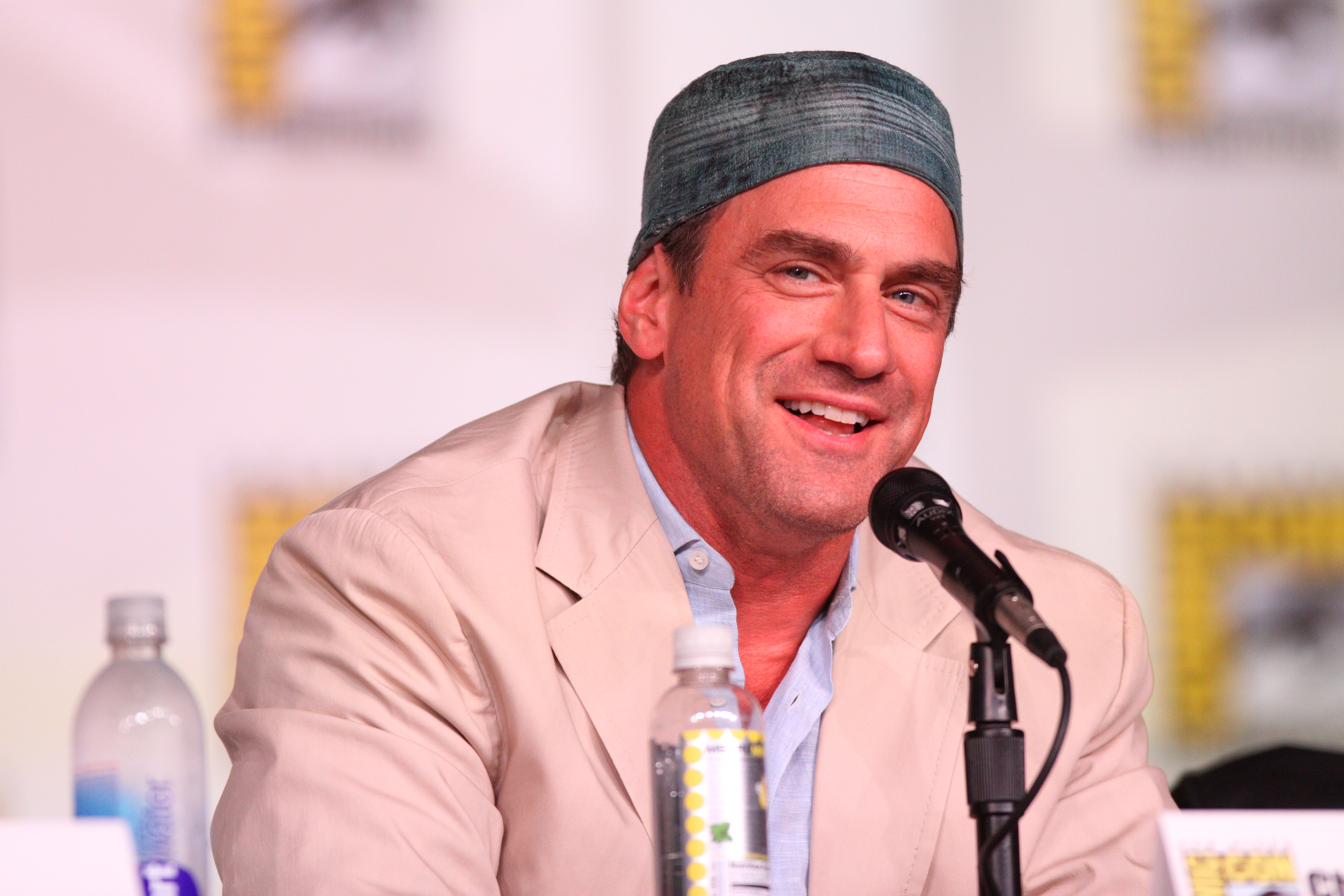
Christopher Meloni

- Gbenga Akinnagbe (born 1978), actor; born in D.C.
- Jonathan Banks (born 1947), actor; born in D.C.
- Dave Bautista (born 1969), actor and former wrestler of the WWE; born in D.C.
- Jon Bernthal (born 1976), actor; born in D.C.
- David Birney (1939–2022), actor; born in D.C.
- Blair Brown (born 1946), actress; born in D.C.
- Billie Burke (1884–1970), actress; born in D.C.
- Louis C.K. (born 1967), actor, comedian; born in D.C.
- Dave Chappelle (born 1973), actor, comedian; born in D.C., raised in suburban Maryland
- Whitney Cummings (born 1982), comedian, actress; born in D.C.
- Pat Flaherty (1897–1970), actor; born in D.C.
- Matt Frewer (born 1958), actor; born in D.C.
- Isabelle Fuhrman (born 1997), born in D.C.
- Betty Gabriel (born 1981), actress born in D.C
- Ana Gasteyer (born 1967), actress; born in D.C.
- Cameron Goodman (born 1984), actress; born in Texas; raised in D.C.
- Regina Hall (born 1971), actress; born in D.C.
- Alyson Hannigan (born 1974), actress; born in D.C.
- Goldie Hawn (born 1945), actress; born in D.C.; raised in Takoma Park, Maryland
- Helen Hayes (1900–1993), actress; born in D.C.
- John Heard (1945–2017), actor; born in D.C.
- Katherine Heigl (born 1978), actress; born in D.C.
- Taraji P. Henson (born 1970), actress; born in D.C.
- Edward Herrmann (1943–2014), actor; born in D.C.
- William Hurt (1950–2022), actor; born in D.C.
- Samuel L. Jackson (born 1948), actor; born in D.C.
- Archie Kao (born 1973), actor; born in D.C.
- Erik King (born 1963), actor; born in D.C.
- Michael Learned (born 1939), actress; born in D.C.
- James McDaniel (born 1958), actor; born in D.C.
- Christopher Meloni (born 1958), actor; born in D.C.
- Bridgit Mendler (born 1992), singer and actress; born in D.C.
- Michael Nouri (born 1958), actor; born in D.C.
- Clifton Powell (born 1956), actor; born in D.C.
- Madlyn Rhue (1935–2003), actress; born in D.C.
- Eden Riegel (born 1981), actress; born in D.C.
- Sam Riegel (born 1976), actor; born in D.C.
- Chita Rivera (1933–2024), Broadway musical actress; born in D.C.
- Corey Parker Robinson (born 1975), actor; born in D.C.
- Yeardley Smith (born 1964), actress; born in Paris, France, raised in D.C.
- Josh Stamberg (born 1970), actor; born in D.C.
- Ben Stein (born 1944), actor, author, economist, former political speechwriter; born in D.C.; raised in Maryland
- Frances Sternhagen (1930–2023), actress; raised in D.C.
- Rip Taylor (1934–2019), actor, comedian; born in D.C.
- Veronica Taylor (born 1965), actress; born in New York, raised in D.C.
- Leigh Taylor-Young (born 1945), actress; born in D.C.
- Justin Theroux (born 1971), actor; born in D.C.
- Tony Todd (1954–2024), actor; born in D.C.
- Robin Weigert (born 1969), actress; born in D.C.
- Samira Wiley (born 1987), actress; born in D.C.
- Kellie Shanygne Williams (born 1976), actress; born in D.C.
- Tom Williamson (born 1990), actor from The Fosters; born in D.C.
- Robert Wisdom (born 1953), actor; born in D.C.
- Jeffrey Wright (born 1965), Tony Award–winning stage and film actor; born in D.C.
- Leonard Wu (born 1986), actor; born in D.C.
- Damian Young (born 1961), actor; born in D.C.
- Rick Yune (born 1971), actor; born in D.C.

== Artists ==
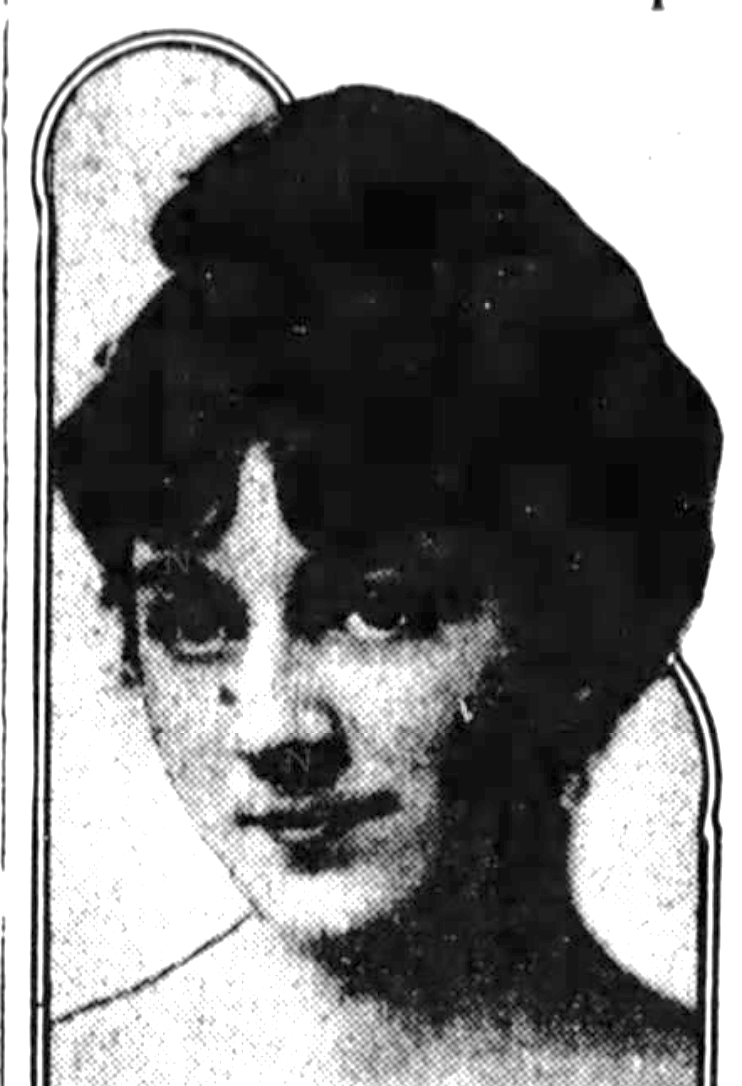
- Inez Demonet
  Richard Artschwager (1923–2013), minimalist and pop artist; born in D.C.
- Robin Bell (born 1979), art projectionist; lives and works in D.C.
- Ned Bittinger (born 1951), portrait painter and illustrator; born in D.C.
- F. Lennox Campello (born 1956), visual artist, critic and author; works in D.C.
- Allen 'Big Al' Carter (1947–2008), painter; worked and taught art in D.C.
- Elizabeth Catlett (1915–2012), sculptor; born in D.C.
- Will H. Chandlee (1865–1955), painter and illustrator; born in D.C.
- Shanthi Chandrasekar, painter and sculptor; works out of D.C.
- Manon Cleary (1942–2011), painter and educator; lived in D.C.
- Gene Davis (1920–1985), painter; born in D.C.
- Rosetta DeBerardinis, visual artist; lives in D.C.
- Inez Demonet (1897–1980), visual artist; born in D.C.
- Victor Ekpuk (born 1964), visual artist; lives in D.C.
- Joseph Craig English, printmaker; born in D.C.
- Sharon Farmer (born 1951), photographer who served as the chief official White House photographer; born in D.C.
- Halim Flowers (born 1980), visual artist; born in Washington, D.C.
- Catriona Fraser (born 1972), photographer and art dealer; worked in D.C.
- Sam Gilliam (1933–2022), painter; lives in D.C.
- Nan Goldin (born 1953), photographer; born in D.C.
- Patricia Goslee, painter, lives in Washington, D.C.
- Michael Janis (born 1959), glass artist; lives in D.C.
- Mark Jenkins (born 1970), street artist; lives in D.C.
- Wayson R. Jones, visual artist; works in D.C.
- Margaret Sherratt Keys (1856–1942), British-born American artist, china painter, store proprietor; lived in D.C.
- Nate Lewis, visual artist; works out of D.C.
- Morris Louis (1912–1962), painter; lived in D.C.
- Kevin MacDonald (1947–2006), painter; lived in D.C.
- Eugene J. Martin (1938–2005), visual artist; born in D.C.
- Percy Martin, visual artist; lives in D.C.
- Benoit Maubrey (born 1952), born in D.C.
- Alexa Meade (born 1986), visual artist; born in D.C.
- Benson Moore (1882–1974), painter and sketcher; lived and worked in D.C.
- Judith Peck, visual artist, works in D.C.
- Michael B. Platt (1948–2019), visual artist and art professor; lived and worked in D.C.
- Martin Puryear (born 1941), sculptor; born in D.C.
- Paul Reed (1919–2015), painter; born in D.C.
- Amber Robles-Gordon, mixed media artist; lives in D.C.
- Joe Shannon (born 1937), painter and educator; worked in D.C.
- Lou Stovall (1937–2023), printmaker; lived in D.C.
- Tim Tate (born 1960), glass and video artist; born in D.C.
- Erwin Timmers (born 1964), glass artist; lives in D.C.
- Bill Watterson (born 1958), cartoonist; born in D.C.
- Frances Wieser (1869–1949), scientific illustrator; born and died in D.C.
- Frank Wright (1932–2020), painter; born in D.C.

== Athletes ==
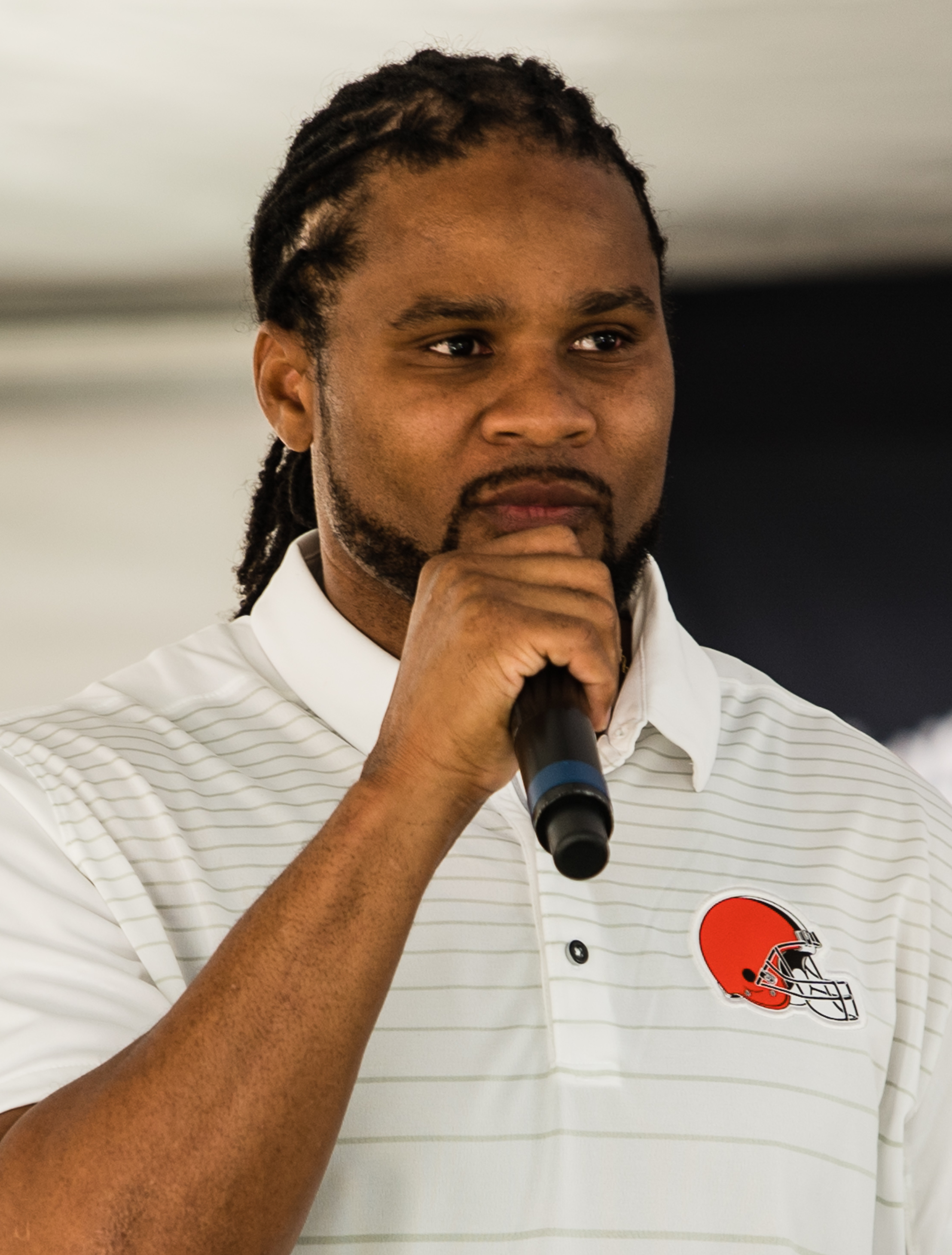
Josh Cribbs

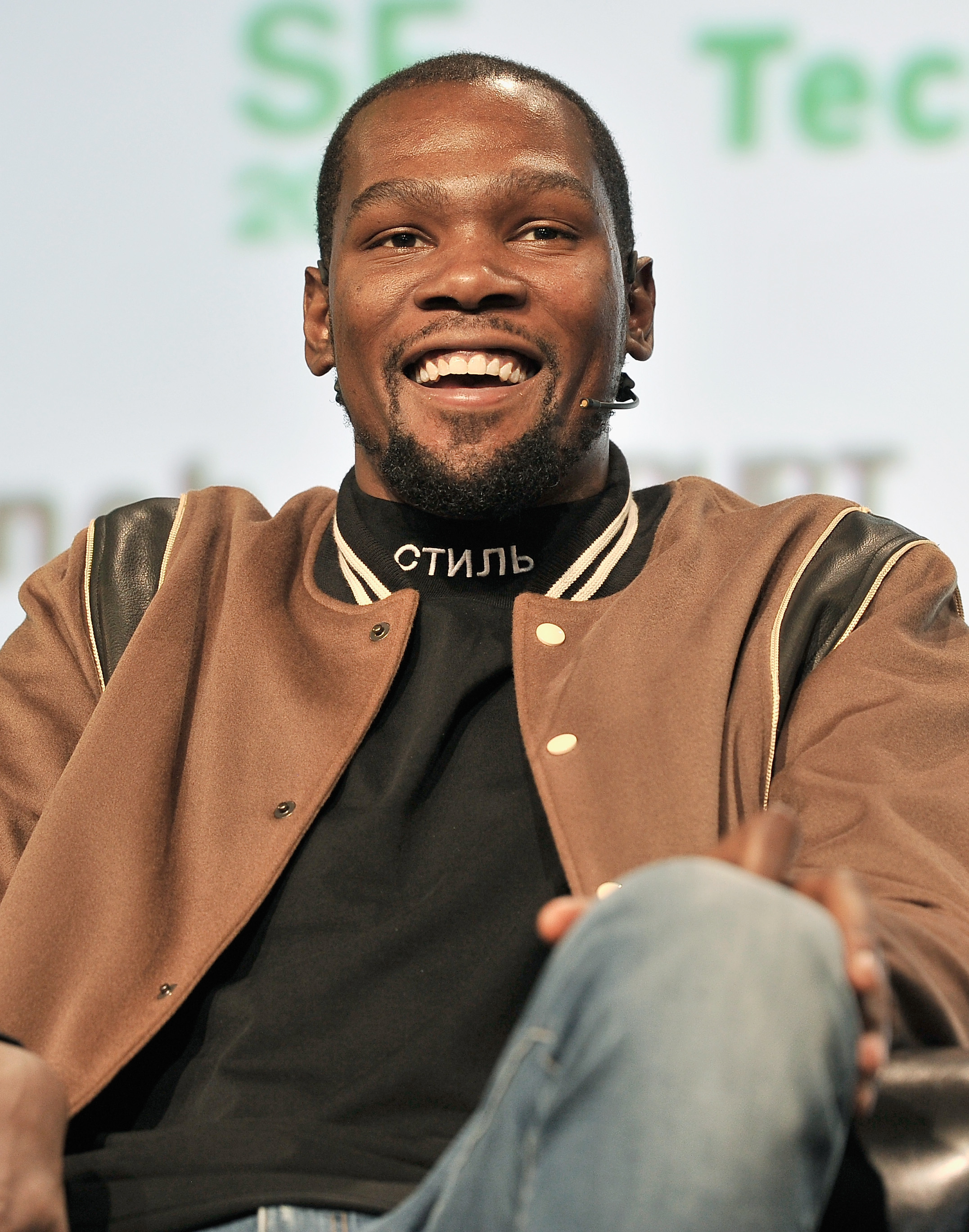
Kevin Durant

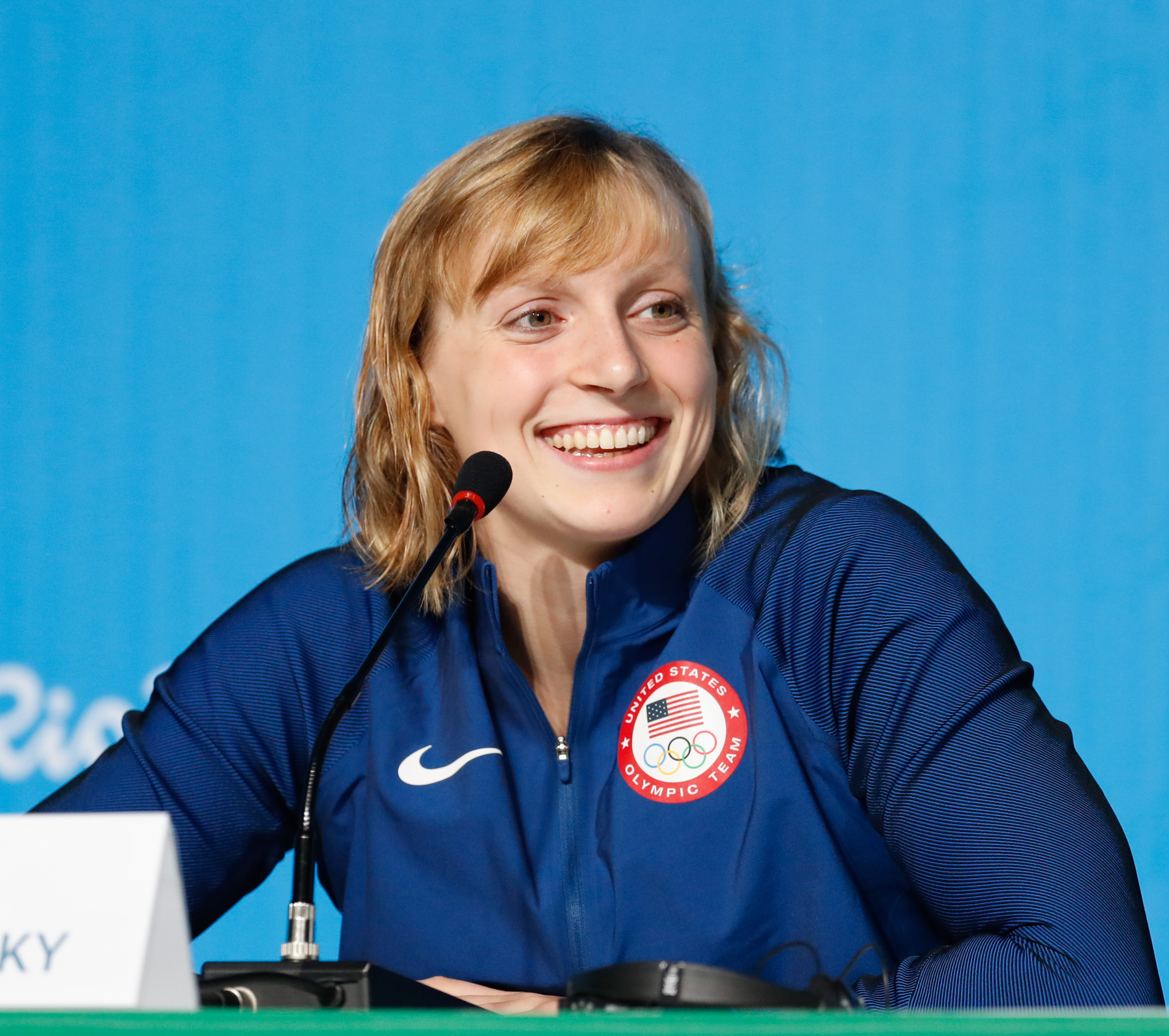
Katie Ledecky

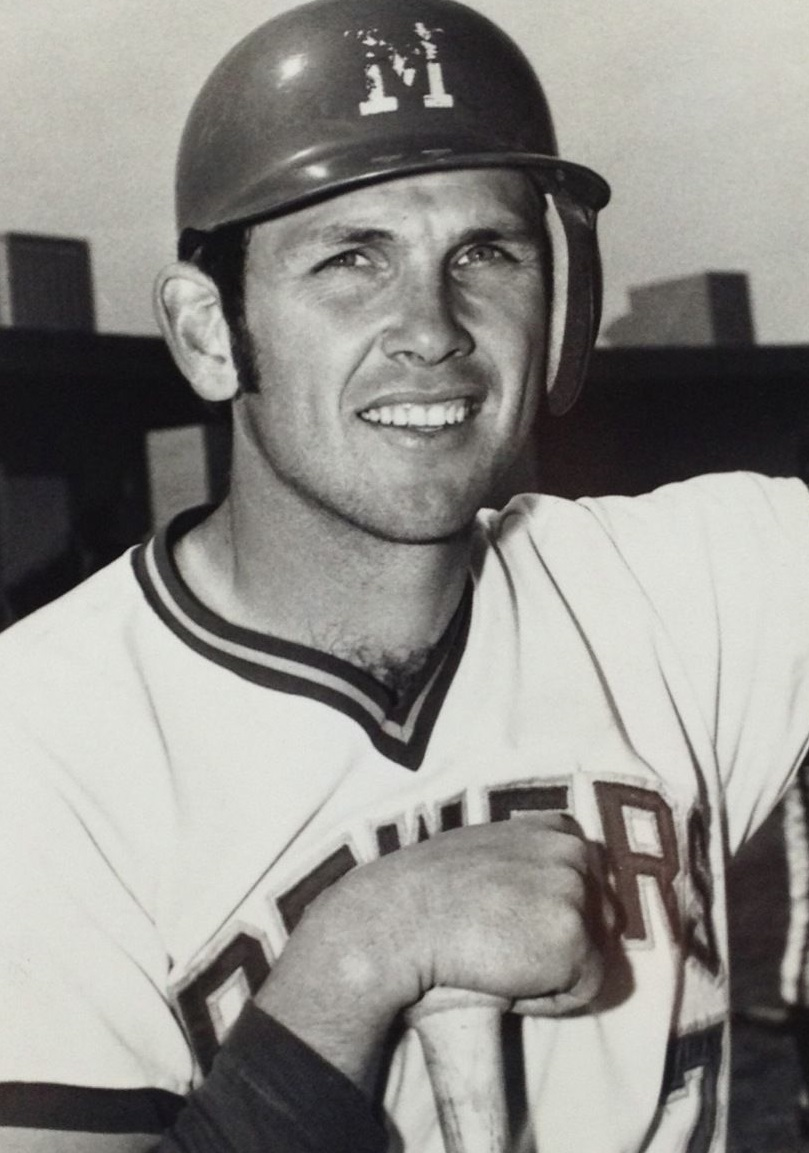
Don Money

- Kevyn Adams (born 1974), hockey player; born in D.C.
- Kevin Alston (born 1988), soccer player; born in D.C.
- Desmond Armstrong (born 1964), soccer player and coach; born in D.C.
- Jake Atz (1879–1945), baseball player; born in D.C.
- Khalid Balogun (born 1998), soccer player; born in D.C.
- Kay Banjo (born 1992), soccer player; born in D.C.
- Mike Banner (born 1984), soccer player; born in D.C.
- Elgin Baylor (1934–2021), basketball player; born in D.C.
- Walter Beall (1899–1959), former baseball player; born in D.C.
- Lu Blue (1897–1958), baseball player; born in D.C.
- Nate Burkey (born 1985), soccer player; born in D.C.
- Jerry Chambers (born 1943), former basketball player; born in D.C.
- Billy Chiles (born 1985), soccer player and coach; born in D.C.
- Patrick Clark (born 1995), professional wrestler; born in D.C.
- Bonzie Colson (born 1996), basketball player in the Israeli Basketball Premier League; born in D.C.
- Arthur Cook (1928–2021), Olympic sport shooter; born in D.C.
- Derek Cooke (born 1991), basketball player; born in D.C.
- Judah Cooks (born 1976), soccer player and coach; born in D.C.
- Micah Cooks (born 1981), soccer player
- Josh Cribbs (born 1983), football player; born in D.C.
- Adrian Dantley (born 1956), former basketball player; born in D.C.
- Vernon Davis (born 1984), football player; born in D.C.
- Vontae Davis (born 1988), football player; born in D.C.
- Kevin Durant (born 1988), basketball player; born in D.C., raised in suburban Maryland
- Malik Ellison (born 1996), basketball player; born in D.C.
- A. J. Francis (born 1990), football player and wrestler; born in D.C.
- Lennard Freeman (born 1995), basketball player; born in D.C.
- Frank Funk (born 1935), former baseball player; born in D.C.
- Luka Garza (born 1998), basketball player; born in D.C.
- Paul Goldstein (born 1976), tennis player; born in D.C.
- Frank Jackson (born 1998), basketball player; born in D.C.
- Khyree Jackson (1999–2024), football player; born in D.C.
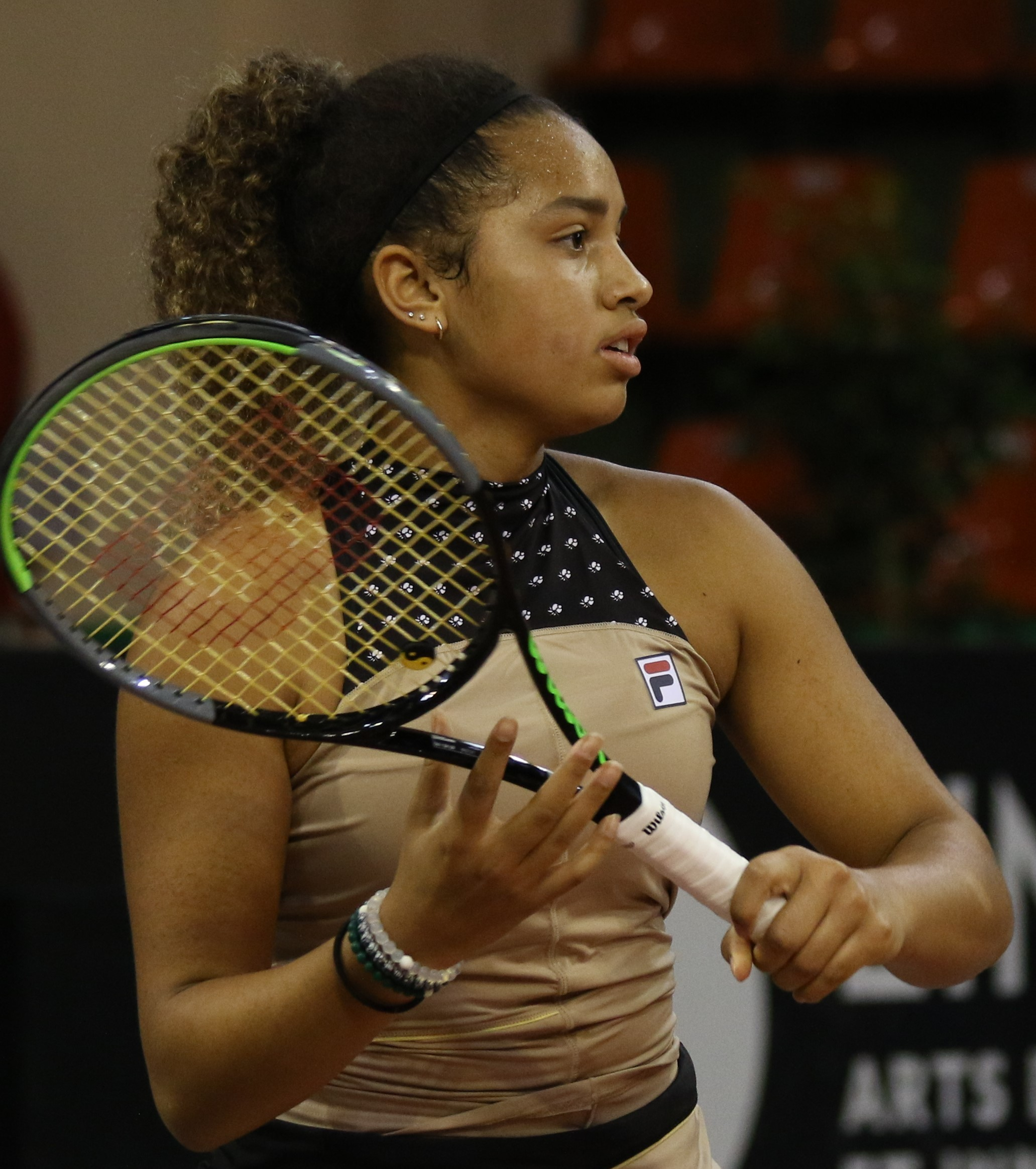
  Robin Montgomery
- Clay Kirby (1948–1991), baseball player; born in D.C.
- Katie Ledecky (born 1997), Olympic swimmer; born in D.C.
- Byron Leftwich (born 1980), football player; born in D.C.
- Tim Legler (born 1966), former basketball player; born in D.C.
- Ricky Lindo (born 2000), American-Panamanian basketball player; born in D.C.
- Andrew Luck (born 1989), football quarterback; born in D.C.
- Shawne Merriman (born 1984), football player; born in D.C.
- Matt Mervis (born 1998), baseball player; born in D.C.
- Rollie Miles (1927–1995), Canadian football player; born in D.C.
- Don Money (born 1947), baseball player; born in D.C.
- Robin Montgomery (born 2004), tennis player; born in D.C.
- Josh Morgan (born 1985), football player; born in D.C.
- Jon Morris (born 1942), football player; born in D.C.
- Bubba Morton (1931–2006), baseball player; born in D.C.
- Jonathan Ogden (born 1974), football player; born in D.C.
- Jordan Pefok (born 1996), soccer player; born in D.C.
- Jamorko Pickett (born 1997), basketball player; born in D.C.
- Jerry Porter (born 1978), former football player; born in D.C.
- Curtis Pride (born 1968), former baseball player; born in D.C.
- Pete Sampras (born 1971), tennis player; born in D.C.
- Gabriel Segal (born 2001), soccer player, born in D.C.
- Harold Solomon (born 1952), former tennis player; born in D.C.
- Teez Tabor (born 1995), cornerback for the Atlanta Falcons; born in D.C.
- Nikki Teasley (born 1979), basketball player; born in D.C.
- James Tillman (1919–2009), Negro league baseball player; born in D.C.
- Michael Weiss (born 1976), figure skater; born in D.C.
- Delonte West (born 1983), basketball player; born in D.C.
- Brian Westbrook (born 1979), football player; born in D.C.
- Mike Wilcher (born 1960), former football player; born in D.C.
- Caleb Williams (born 2001), football player; born in D.C.
- Maury Wills (1932–2022), former baseball player; born in D.C.
- Willie Wood (1936–2020), football player; born in D.C.

== Entertainers ==
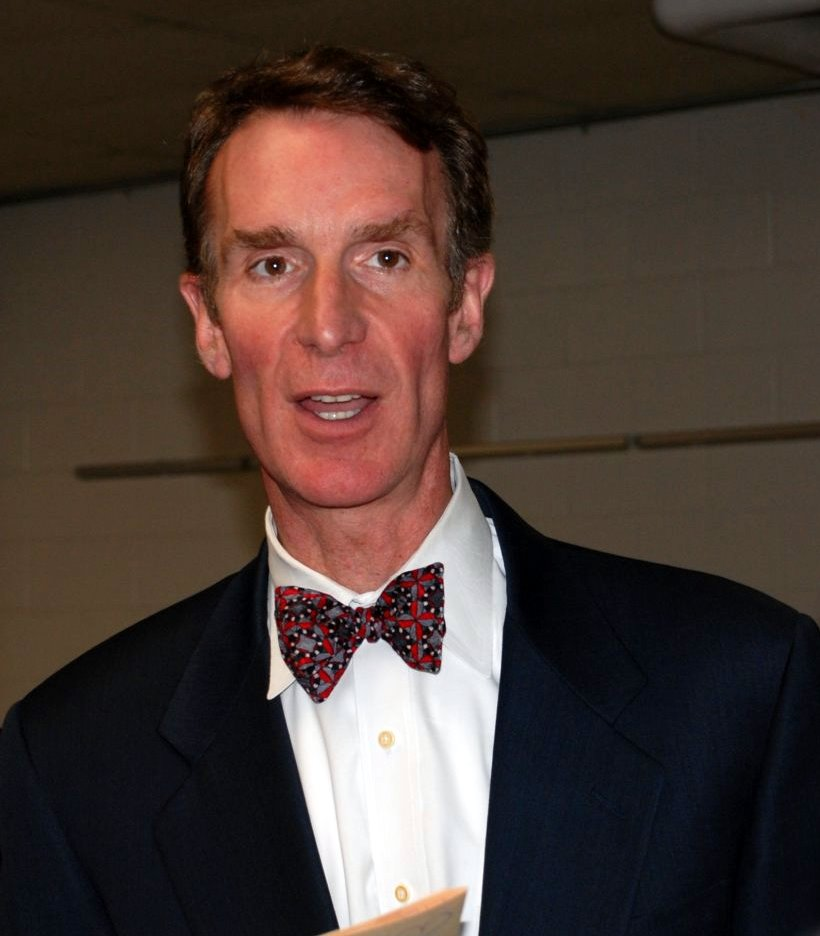
Bill Nye

- Pat Buchanan (born 1938), author, syndicated columnist, television commentator; born in D.C.
- Connie Chung (born 1946), television journalist; born in D.C.
- Stephen Colbert (born 1964), television host, comedian; born in D.C.
- Sam Denby (born 1998), YouTuber; born and raised in D.C.
- Sarah Urist Green (born 1979), PBS art program creator and former museum curator; born in D.C.
- Petey Greene (1931–1984), radio and TV talk show host; born in D.C.
- Tim Gunn (born 1953), TV personality and fashion expert; born in D.C.
- Jim Henson (1936–1990), creator of the Muppets; lived in D.C. from 1948 until 1961.
- King Molasses, drag king
- Fulton Lewis (1903–1966), radio and TV commentator; born in D.C.
- Patricia Newcomb (born 1930), producer and publicist; born in D.C.
- Bill Nye ("Bill Nye the Science Guy") (born 1955), television host, scientist, mechanical engineer; born in D.C.
- Maury Povich (born 1939), television talk show host; born in D.C.
- Diane Rehm (born 1936), radio talk show host; born in D.C.
- Scott Sanders (born 1968), screenwriter and director, born in N.C., raised in D.C.

== Journalists ==
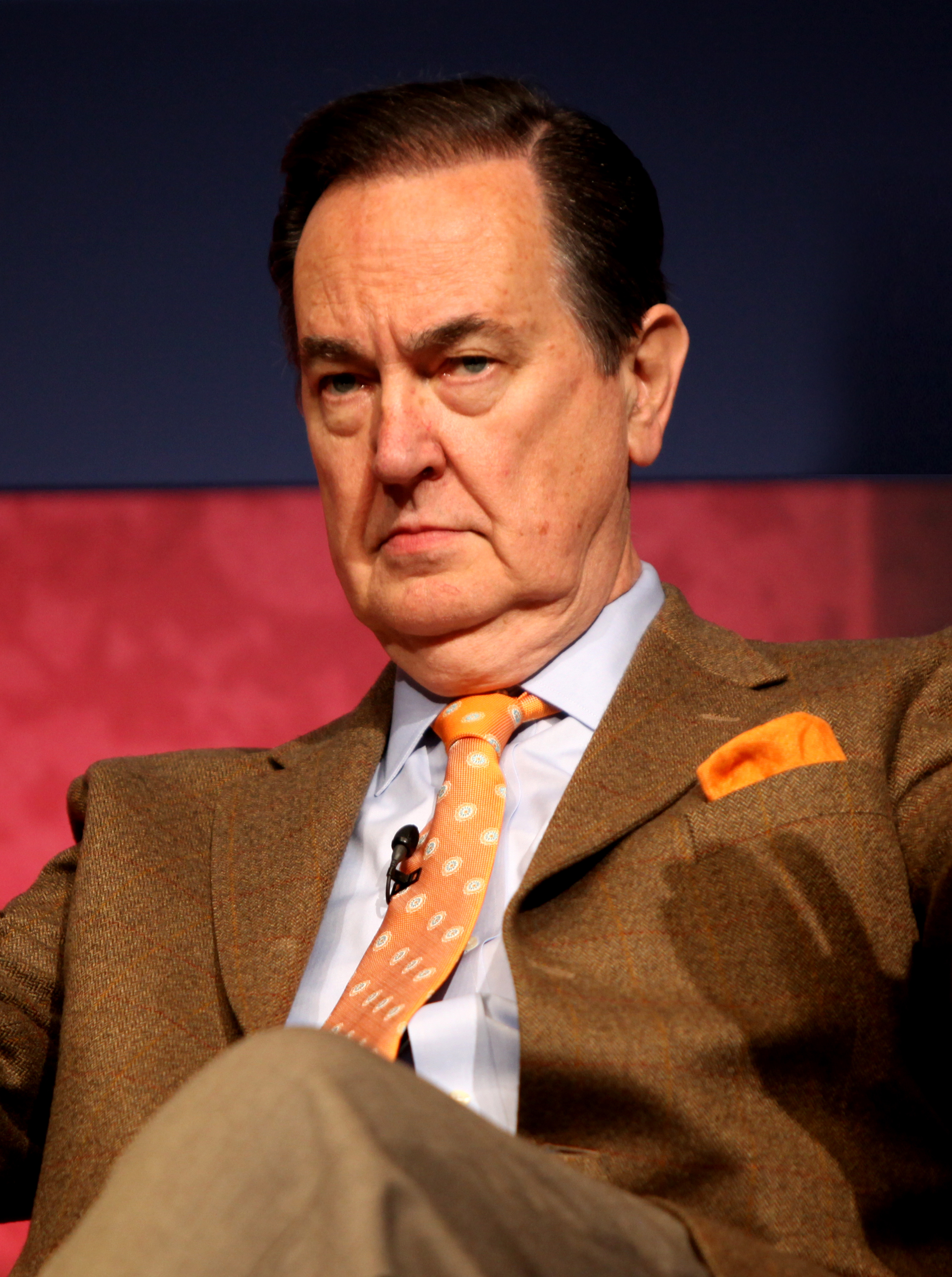
Cal Thomas

- Jim Acosta (born 1971), journalist born in D.C.
- Thomas Boswell (born 1947), journalist born in D.C.
- John Dickerson (born 1968), journalist; born in D.C.
- Susan Ford (born 1957), photojournalist and chairman of the Betty Ford Center; born in D.C.
- David Frum (born 1960), journalist, newspaper writer of The Atlantic
- Anna Sanborn Hamilton (1848–1927), journalist, author, and teacher; lived, died in D.C.
- Douglas Harriman Kennedy (born 1967), journalist born in D.C.
- Austin H. Kiplinger (1918–2015), journalist and philanthropist; born in D.C.
- Buster Olney (born 1964), sports columnist; born in D.C.
- Frank Rich (born 1949), newspaper columnist; born in D.C.
- David Simon (born 1960), author, journalist; born in D.C.
- A. G. Sulzberger (born 1980), journalist; born in D.C.
- Cal Thomas (born 1942), newspaper columnist and author; born in D.C.
- Margaret Hicks Williams (1899–1972), government official, feature writer, political expert; lived in D.C.

== Military ==
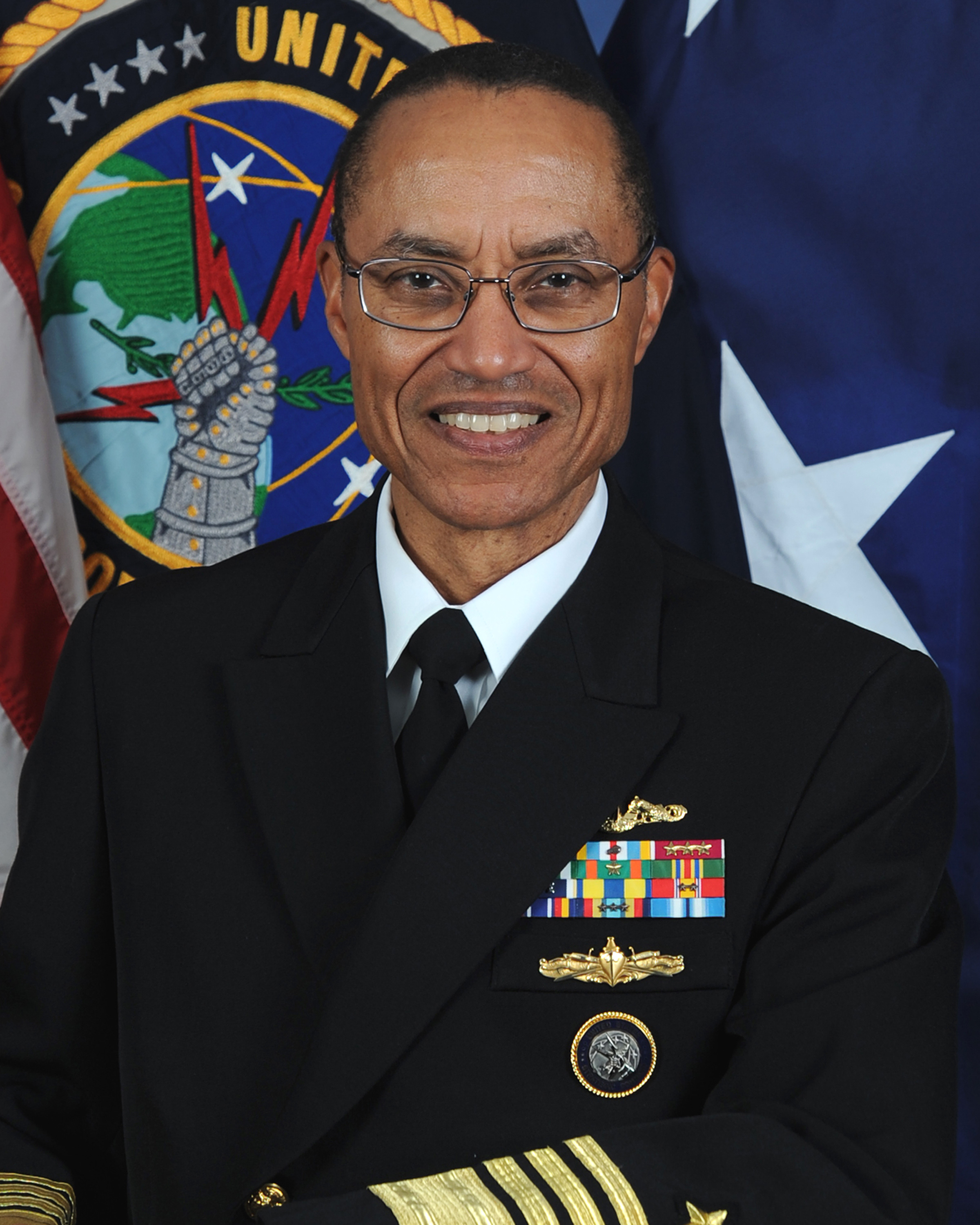
Cecil D. Haney

- Frederic Vaughan Abbot (1858–1928), U.S. Army brigadier general, resided in D.C. during retirement
- Alfred E. Bates (1840–1909), U.S. Army major general, lived in D.C. during retirement
- Upton Birnie Jr. (1877–1957), U.S. Army major general, retired in D.C.
- Harold W. Blakeley (1893–1966), U.S. Army major general, retired in D.C.
- George S. Blanchard (1920–2006), U.S. Army four-star general; born in D.C.
- Nathan W. Brown (1819–1893), paymaster-general of the U.S. Army, lived in D.C. during retirement
- William Bryden (1880–1972), U.S. Army major general, lived in Washington, D.C. during retirement
- John Loomis Chamberlain (1858–1948), U.S. Army major general, retired in Washington, D.C.
- John R. D. Cleland (1925–2017), U.S. Army major general; born and raised in Washington
- John J. Coppinger (1834–1909), U.S. Army major general; lived in Washington during his retirement
- Samuel T. Cushing (1839–1901), U.S. Army brigadier general; lived in D.C. during retirement
- John M. K. Davis (1844–1920), U.S. Army brigadier general; born in D.C.
- Richmond P. Davis (1866–1937), US Army major general, retired in Washington, DC
- Lester A. Dessez (1896–1981), U.S. Marine Corps brigadier general; raised in D.C.
- Charles Bernadou Elliott (1882–1958), US Army colonel; born in DC, retired to and died in DC
- Lorenzo D. Gasser (1876–1955), U.S. Army general, retired to Washington, D.C.
- Charles Badger Hall (1844–1914), US Army major general, retired in D.C.
- Laurence Halstead (1875–1953), US Army brigadier general, retired in Washington, D.C.
- Cecil D. Haney (born 1955), U.S. Navy admiral who commanded U.S. Strategic Command; born in D.C.
- George Herbert Harries (1860–1934), U.S. Army major general, resided in Washington, D.C.
- Charles L. Hodges (1847–1911), U.S. Army major general, retired in Washington, D.C.
- Martin P. Hottel (1904–1981), U.S. Navy admiral and decorated submarine commander; born in D.C.
- Henry W. Hubbell (1842–1917), US Army brigadier general; lived in Washington during retirement.
- Miles Imlay (1902–1975), U.S. Coast Guard rear admiral, born in D.C.
- Beverley Kennon (1793–1844), commodore in the United States Navy and commander of the Bureau of Construction and Repair; resided in Washington
- Lester Lyles (born 1946), former U.S. Air Air Force general, vice chief of Staff of the United States Air Force, and commander, Air Force Materiel Command
- Robert Macfeely (1826–1901), US Army brigadier general, retired in Washington
- Anthony McAuliffe (1898–1975), U.S. Army general, commander of the 101st Airborne Division defending Bastogne; born in D.C.
- Samuel W. Miller (1857–1940), US Army brigadier general, lived in Washington during retirement
- John Kemp Mizner (1834–1898), US Army brigadier general, retired in Washington, D.C.
- Charles Morton (1846–1914), US Army brigadier general, retired in Washington
- Henry C. Newcomer (1861–1952), U.S. Army brigadier general, engineer whose work included Taft Bridge and improvements to Washington Aqueduct; retired to Washington, D.C.
- Edward C. Peter II (1929–2008), U.S. Army lieutenant general, commander of Fourth United States Army; born in D.C.
- Thomas H. Rees (1863–1942), US Army brigadier general, lived in Washington during retirement
- Curtis C. Robinson (1919–2009), pharmacist, U.S. Army Air Force officer, fighter pilot with the Tuskegee Airmen; lived and died in D.C.
- William B. Rochester (1826–1909), paymaster-general of the United States Army
- Otho B. Rosenbaum (1871–1962), U.S. Army brigadier general, resided in Washington, D.C. during retirement
- Daniel H. Rucker (1812–1910), U.S. Army brigadier general, resided in Washington, D.C. during retirement
- Joseph P. Sanger (1840–1926), U.S. Army major general
- Charles G. Sawtelle (1834–1913), U.S. Army brigadier general, resided in Washington, D.C. during retirement
- Charles L. Scott (1883–1954), U.S. Army major general; lived in D.C. in retirement; died in D.C.
- Alexander E. Shiras (1812–1875), US Army brigadier general, lived in DC during military service
- William A. Shunk (1857–1936), US Army colonel whose commands included the United States Army Command and General Staff College; lived in D.C. during retirement
- William Sinclair (1835–1905), U.S. Army brigadier general, lived in Washington during retirement
- William Renwick Smedberg Jr. (1871–1942), U.S. Army brigadier general; lived in D.C. in retirement; died in D.C.
- Franklin Guest Smith (1840–1912), U.S. Army brigadier general, resident of Washington, D.C. during retirement
- Culver C. Sniffen (1844–1930), paymaster-general of the United States Army, lived in Washington
- Oliver Lyman Spaulding (1875–1947), U.S. Army brigadier general, 1891 graduate of Central High School, lived in Washington during retirement
- William F. Spurgin (1838–1904), U.S. Army brigadier general, live in Washington during retirement
- Donald A. Stroh (1892–1953), U.S. Army major general, raised and educated in Washington, retired to Washington
- Edwin F. Townsend (1833–1909), U.S. Army brigadier general, retired in D.C.
- Karl Truesdell (1882–1955), U.S. Army major general, raised in D.C.
- Carlos Clark Van Leer (1865–1953), U.S. Army captain and chief of Personnel and Budget for Department of Treasury: lived and died in D.C.
- George Henry Weeks (1834–1905), quartermaster general of the United States Army, retired to D.C.
- Earle Wheeler (1908–1975), U.S. Army general; born in D.C.
- Walter K. Wilson Sr. (1880–1954), US Army major general, lived in DC in retirement
- Eben Eveleth Winslow (1866–1928), U.S. Army brigadier general; raised and educated in D.C.
- William T. Wood (1854–1943), U.S. Army brigadier general, resided in Washington, D.C. during retirement
- John E. Woodward (1870–1944), U.S. Army brigadier general, lived in D.C. during retirement

== Musicians ==
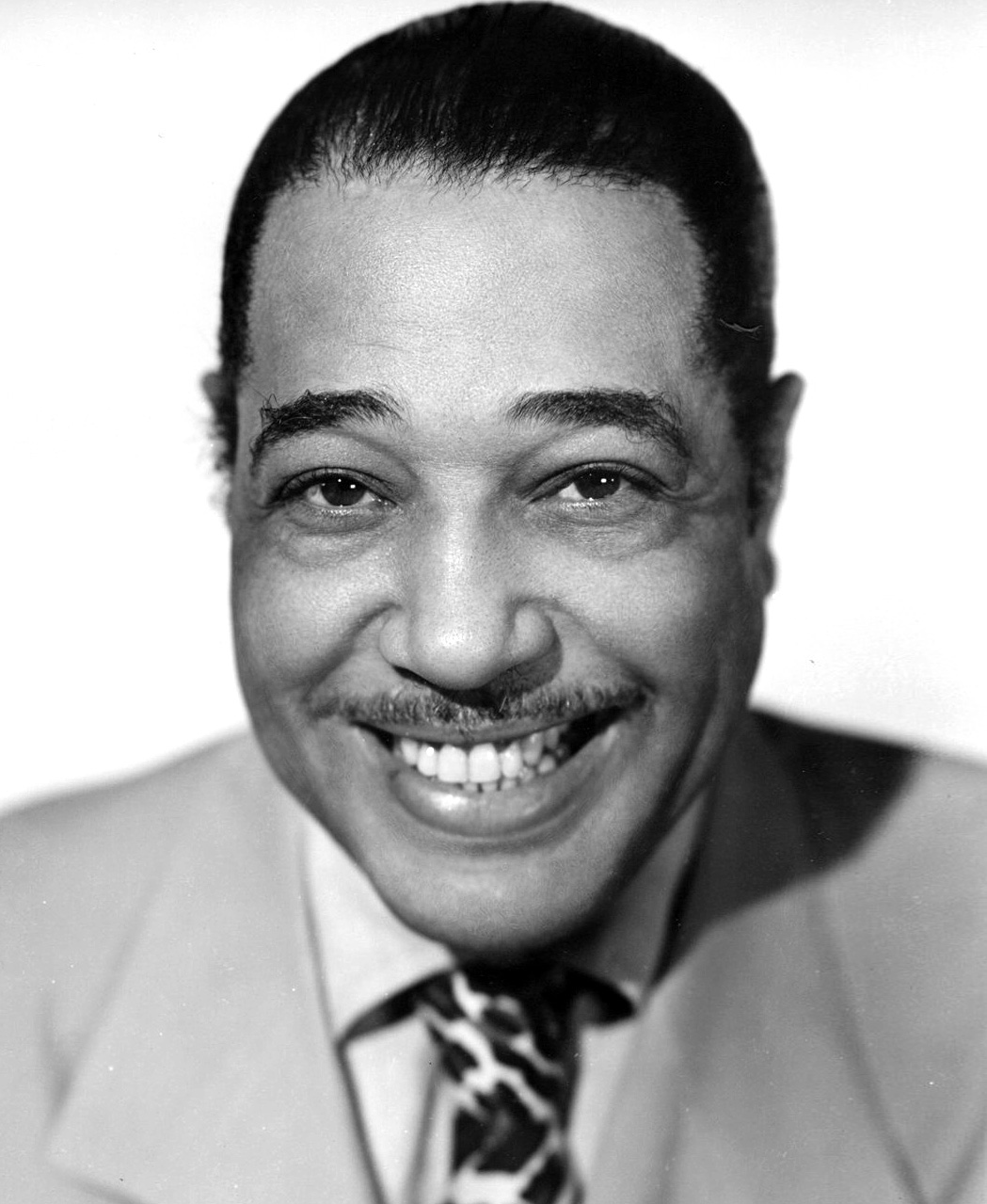
Duke Ellington

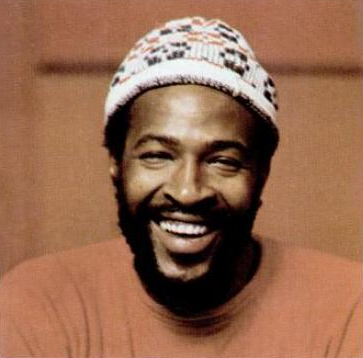
Marvin Gaye

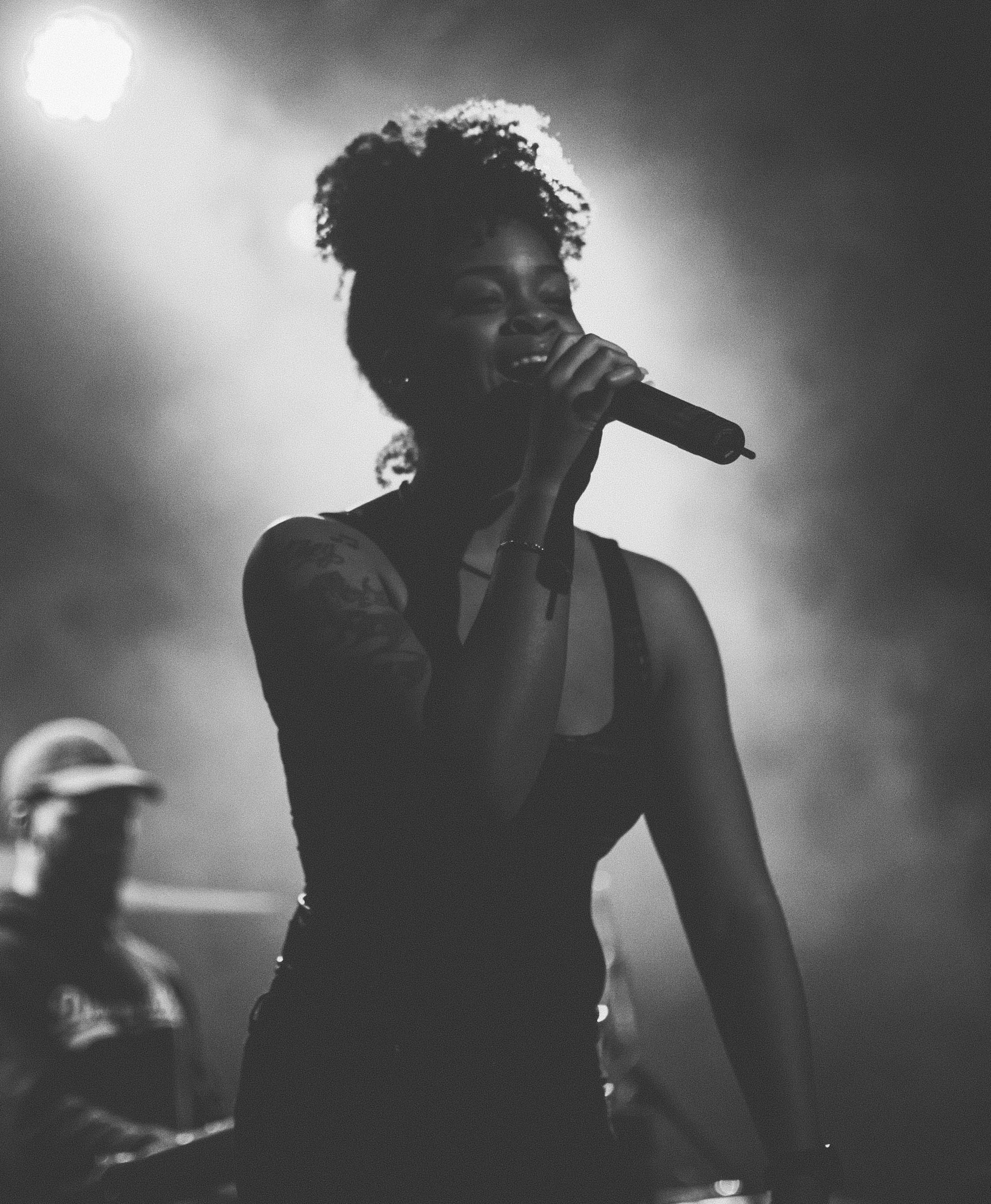
Ari Lennox

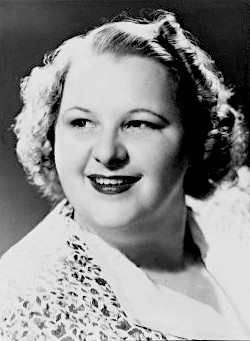
Kate Smith

- Chuck Brown (1936–2012), musician; lived in D.C.
- Tim Buckley (1947–1975), musician; born in D.C.
- Vernon Burch (1955–2022), singer; born in D.C.
- Darrell Calker (1905–1964), composer and arranger, born in D.C.
- Jack Casady (born 1944), musician (Jefferson Airplane, Hot Tuna); born in D.C.
- Eva Cassidy (1963–1996), singer; born in D.C.
- Chris Cutler (born 1947), musician (Henry Cow, Art Bears); born in D.C.
- DJ Kool (born 1958), rapper; born in D.C.
- Duke Ellington (1899–1974), jazz composer, pianist and bandleader; born in D.C.
- John Fahey (1939–2001), musician; born in D.C.
- Marty Friedman (born 1962), musician; born in D.C.
- Danny Gatton (1945–1994), musician; born in D.C.
- Marvin Gaye (1939–1984), singer; born in D.C.
- Johnny Gill (born 1966), singer; born in D.C.
- Ginuwine (born 1970), singer; born in D.C.
- Goldlink (born 1993), rapper; born in D.C.
- Dave Grohl (born 1969), musician (Nirvana, Foo Fighters); began career as drummer for D.C.-area bands
- Ron Holloway (born 1953), musician; (Dizzy Gillespie, Susan Tedeschi, Gil Scott-Heron); born in D.C.
- Shirley Horn (1934–2005), singer; born in D.C.
- Lida Husik (born 1963), musician; born in D.C.
- Darryl Jenifer (born 1960), musician; born in D.C.
- Al Jolson (1886–1950), singer; born in Seredžius, Lithuania; raised in D.C.
- Jorma Kaukonen (born 1940), musician (Jefferson Airplane, Hot Tuna); born in D.C.
- Damian Kulash (born 1975), musician (OK Go); born in D.C.
- Stacy Lattisaw (born 1966), singer; born in D.C.
- Ari Lennox (born 1991), singer; born in D.C
- Ian MacKaye (born 1962), musician (Minor Threat, Fugazi); born in D.C.
- Van McCoy (1940–1979), musician, songwriter and producer; born in D.C.
- Mýa (born 1979), singer; born in D.C.
- Nonchalant (born 1970), rapper; born in D.C.
- Oddisee (born 1985), rapper; born in D.C.
- Guy Picciotto (born 1965), musician (Rites of Spring, Fugazi); born in D.C.
- James Ray (1941–1963), singer; born in D.C.
- Malinda Kathleen Reese (born 1994), singer-songwriter; born in D.C.
- Henry Rollins (born 1961), singer-songwriter (Black Flag, Rollins Band); born in D.C.
- Tim Rose (1940–2002), singer-songwriter; born in D.C.
- rum.gold (born 1994), R&B singer-songwriter; born and raised in D.C.
- Hayley Sales, pop singer; born in D.C.
- Shy Glizzy (born 1992), rapper; born in D.C.
- Richard Smallwood (born 1948), Grammy Award–winning gospel singer-songwriter; born in Atlanta and raised in D.C.
- Kate Smith (1907–1986), singer; born in D.C.
- Rob Sonic, rapper; born in D.C.
- John Philip Sousa (1854–1932), composer; born in D.C.
- Billy Stewart (1937–1970), singer; born in D.C.
- Mary Timony (born 1970), musician; born in D.C.
- Peter Tork (1942–2019), musician; born in D.C.
- Wale (born 1984), rapper; born in D.C.
- Wax (born 1980), rapper; born in D.C.

== Political figures ==
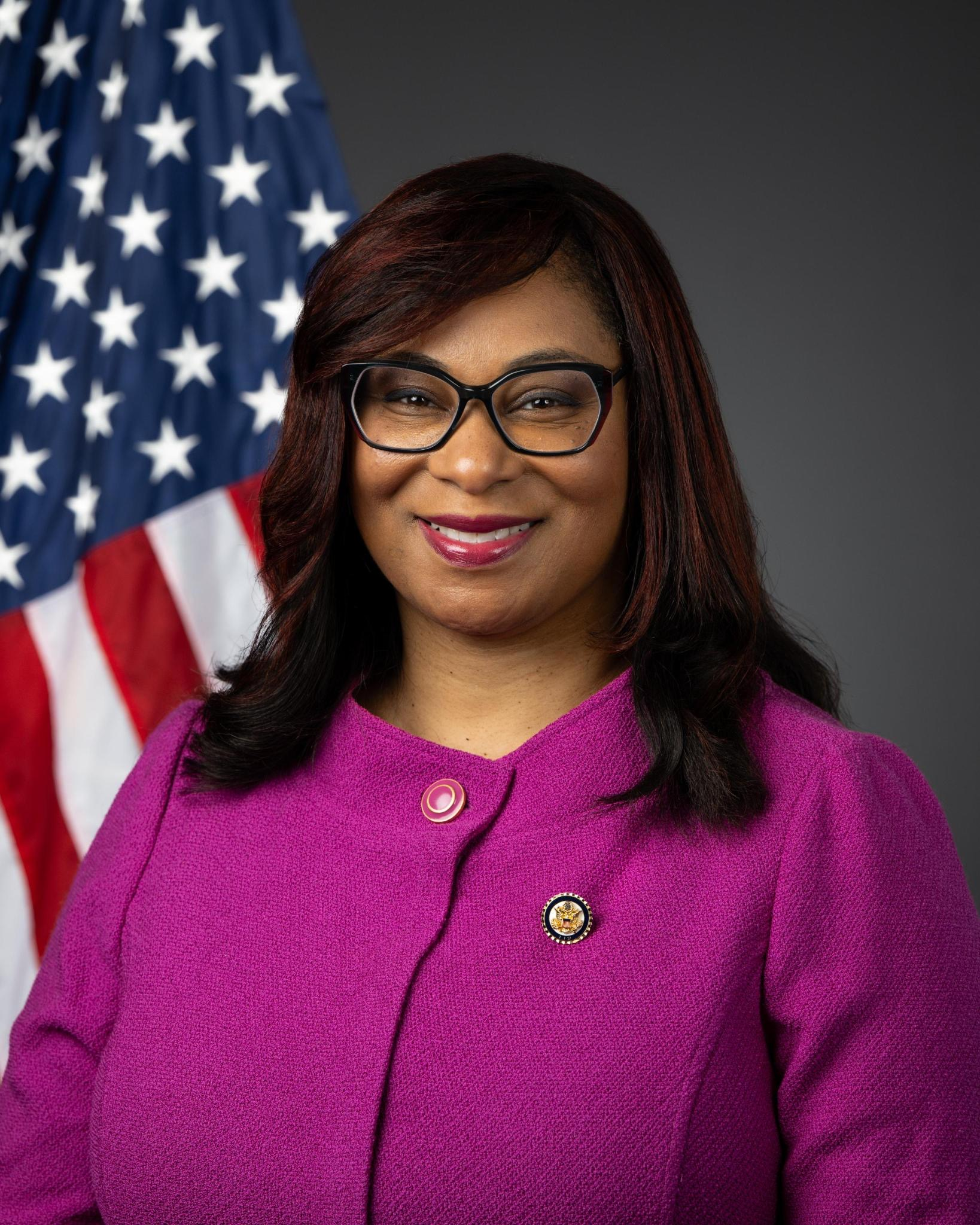
Janelle Bynum

Al Gore

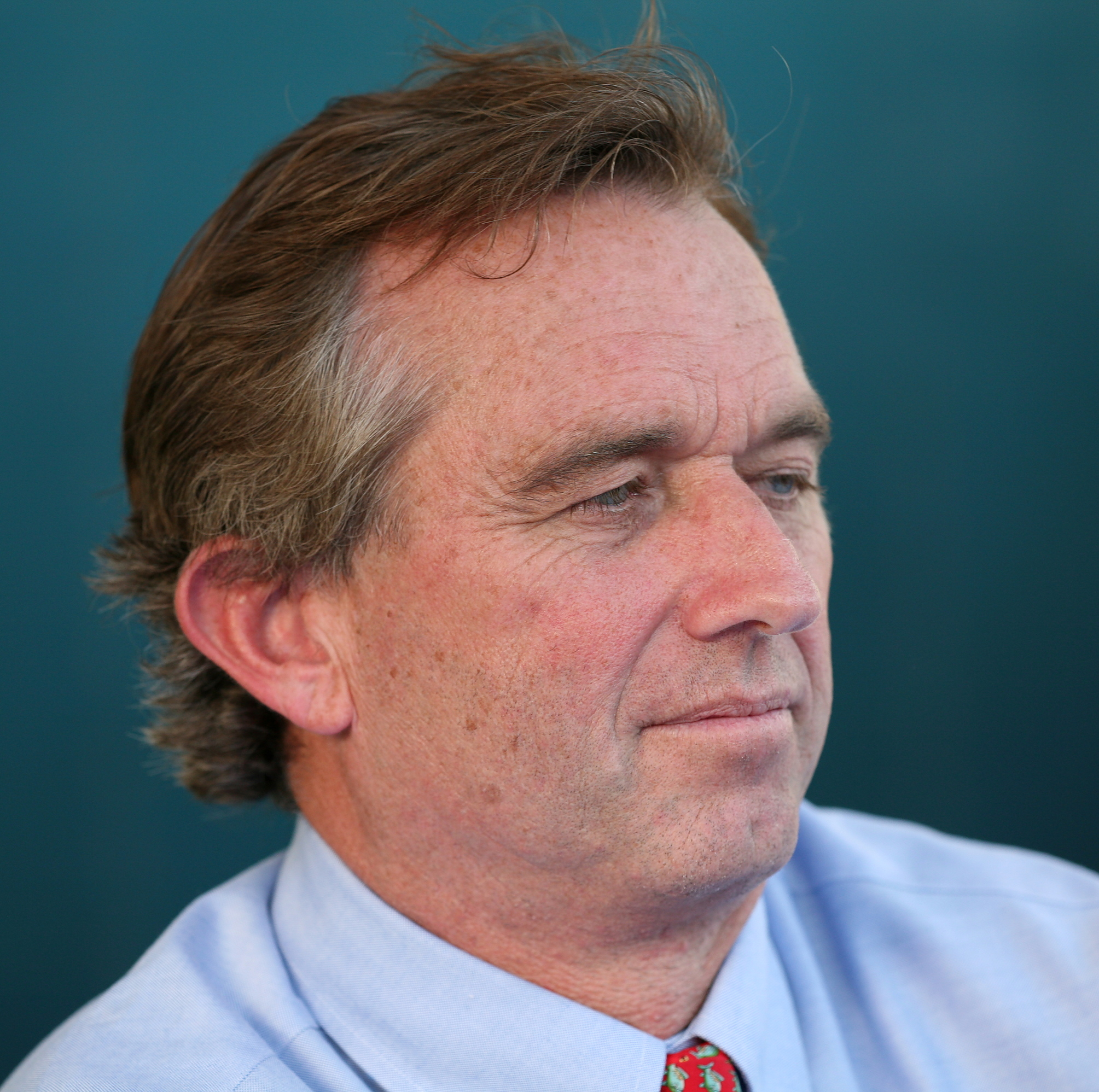
Robert F. Kennedy Jr.

- Kenneth Bacon (1944–2009), Department of Defense spokesman; later served as president of Refugees International
- Michael Bennet (born 1964), U.S. senator from Colorado; grew up in D.C.
- Cory Booker (born 1969), U.S. senator from New Jersey; born in D.C.
- Muriel Bowser (born 1972), mayor of Washington D.C.
- Janelle Bynum (born 1975), U.S. representative from Oregon; born in D.C.
- Jean Carnahan (1933–2024), U.S. senator from Missouri, born and raised in D.C.
- Mel Carnahan (1934–2000), governor of Missouri, raised in D.C.
- Pedro Casanave (c. 1766–1796), fifth mayor of Georgetown in Washington, D.C.
- Dereck E. Davis (born 1967), treasurer of Maryland; born in D.C.
- John Foster Dulles (1888–1959), U.S. secretary of state; born in D.C.
- Omar Fateh (born 1990), Minnesota state senator; born in D.C.
- Adrian Fenty (born 1970), mayor of the District of Columbia, 2007–2011; born in D.C.
- Dan Goldman (born 1976), U.S. representative from New York; born in D.C.
- Don Forsht, West Virginia state delegate; born in D.C.
- Al Gore (born 1948), U.S. vice president; born in D.C.; Nobel Peace Prize laureate for climate change advocacy, recipient of the UN Champions of the Earth Environmental Award
- Tipper Gore (born 1948), wife of former vice president Al Gore; born in D.C.
- Larry Hogan (born 1956), governor of Maryland; born in D.C.
- Hank Johnson (born 1954), U.S. representative from Georgia; born in D.C.
- Abraham Katz (1926–2013), diplomat, United States ambassador to the OECD; lived in D.C.
- Sharon Pratt Kelly (born 1944), mayor of the District of Columbia, 1991–1995; born in D.C.
- Robert F. Kennedy Jr. (born 1954), politician, environmental lawyer, author, serving as the 26th United States Secretary of Health and Human Services since 2025; born in D.C.
- Ned Lamont (born 1954), businessman and 89th governor of Connecticut; born in D.C.
- Eleanor Holmes Norton (born 1937), delegate to the U.S. House of Representatives for Washington, D.C.; born in D.C.
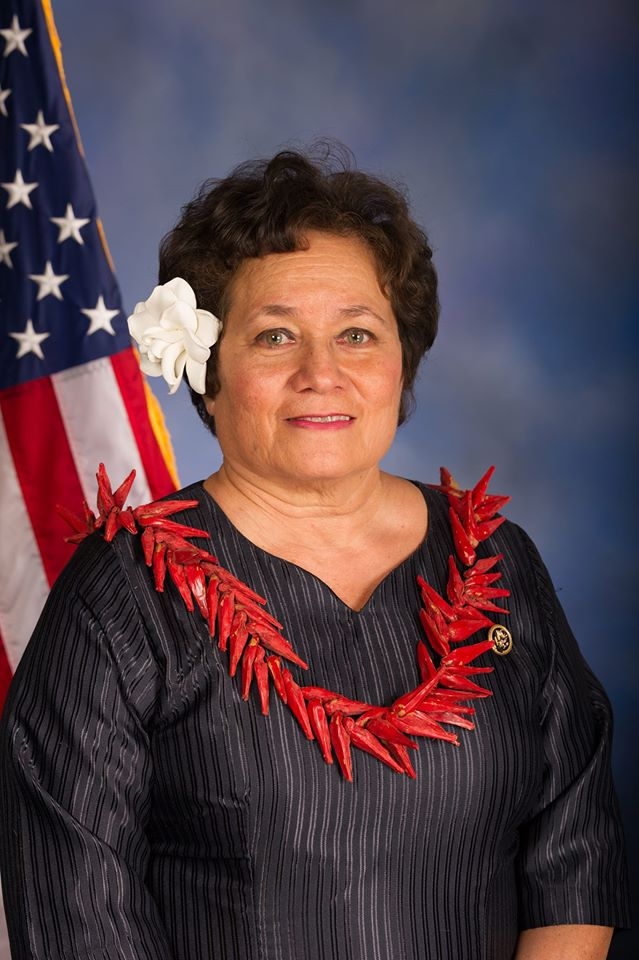
  Amata Coleman Radewagen
- Jimmy Panetta (born 1969), U.S. representative from California; born in D.C.
- Bill Posey (born 1947), U.S. representative from Florida; born in D.C.
- Jerome Powell (born 1953), chair of the Federal Reserve and member of the Federal Reserve Board of Governors; born in D.C.
- Amata Coleman Radewagen (born 1947), delegate to the U.S. House of Representatives from American Samoa; born in D.C.
- Jamie Raskin (born 1962), U.S. representative from Maryland; born in D.C.
- Bobby Scott (born 1947), U.S. representative from Virginia; born in D.C.
- Henry Austin Scudder (1819–1892), Massachusetts state politician and associate judge of the Superior Court of Massachusetts; lived in D.C.
- Brian Sims (born 1978), Democratic member of the Pennsylvania House of Representatives; born in D.C.
- Adam Smith (born 1965), U.S. representative from Washington; born in D.C.
- Josh Stein (born 1966), governor and attorney general of North Carolina; born in D.C.
- Gladys Spellman (1918–1988), former member of the U.S. House of Representatives from Maryland; raised in New York and D.C.
- Charles W. Swisher, thirteenth secretary of state of West Virginia; died in D.C.
- Conrad Tillard (born 1964), politician, Baptist minister, radio host, author, and activist; raised in D.C.
- Walter Nathan Tobriner (1902–1979), Washington, D.C., government official; born in D.C.
- Larry Warner (1943–2022), Texas state legislator; born in D.C.
- Paul Wellstone (1944–2002), U.S. senator from Minnesota; born in D.C.
- Rob Wittman (born 1959), U.S. representative from Virginia; born in D.C.

== Scientists ==
- Charles R. Drew (1904–1950), physician, medical researcher; born in D.C.
- Danielle Hairston, psychiatrist; educated in D.C.
- Michael Hendricks, psychologist, suicidologist, and advocate for the LGBT community; long-time resident of D.C.
- Lars Krutak, tattoo anthropologist; long-time resident of D.C.
- Joe Romm (1960–2026), physicist and climate communicator; long-time resident of D.C.

== Writers ==
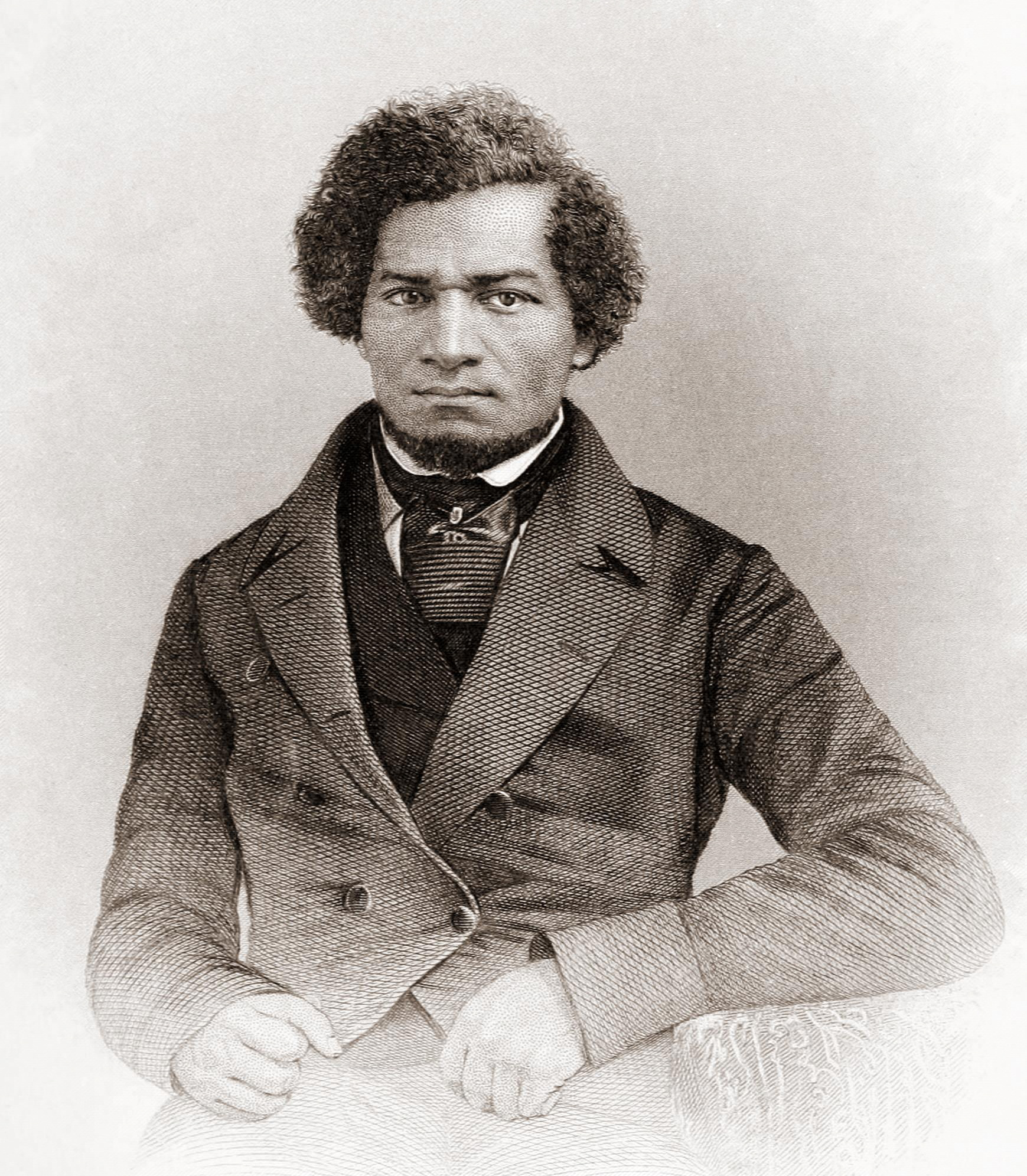
Frederick Douglass

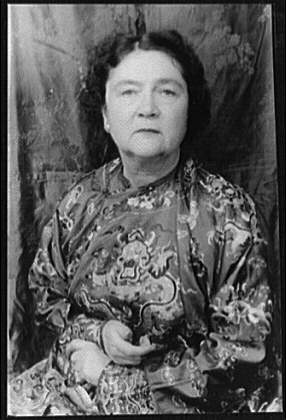
Marjorie Kinnan Rawlings

- Edward Albee (1928–2016), playwright; born in D.C.
- Alida Anderson (born 1969), arts researcher, author and professor at American University; born in D.C.
- Ann Beattie (born 1947), short story writer and novelist; born in D.C.
- Tracy Chevalier (born 1962), novelist; born in D.C.
- Cheryl Clarke (born 1947), poet and essayist; born in D.C.
- Katherine M. Cook (1876–1962), educator and government official who specialized in rural education; lived and worked in D.C.
- Ella Loraine Dorsey (1853–1935), author, journalist, translator; born in D.C.
- Frederick Douglass (1817 or 1818–1895), author, public speaker, political activist, abolitionist; lived and died in D.C.
- Jonathan Safran Foer (born 1977), writer; born in D.C.
- Mary Downing Hahn (born 1937), author; born in D.C.
- Christopher Hitchens (1949–2011), author, journalist, political philosopher; lived in D.C. for most of his writing career
- Langston Hughes (1901–1967), writer, poet; lived in D.C. at the start of his writing career
- Edward P. Jones (born 1951), author; raised in D.C.
- Florence King (1936–2016), author; born in D.C.
- Jeannie Blackburn Moran (1842–1929), author, community leader, socialite, and philanthropist; lived in and died in D.C.
- George Pelecanos (born 1957), author of detective fiction; born in D.C.
- Marjorie Kinnan Rawlings (1896–1953), writer; born in D.C.
- Frederick Reuss (born 1960), novelist known for works such as Mohr and Horace Afoot
- David Simon (born 1960), screenwriter; born in D.C.
- Paula Vogel (born 1951), playwright; born in D.C.
- Walt Whitman (1819–1892), journalist, poet, essayist; lived in D.C. for a decade during and after the American Civil War

== Miscellaneous ==
- Robert Askins (1919–2010), suspected serial killer; born in D.C.
- Zak Bagans (born 1977), paranormal expert
- Vanilla Beane (1919–2022), Black milliner and businesswoman; moved to D.C. in the 1940s
- John L. Carroll (1943–2023), federal judge and academic administrator; born in D.C.
- Blac Chyna (born 1988), socialite and model; born and raised in D.C.
- Ruby Corado (born 1970), transgender activist, founder and executive director of Casa Ruby in D.C.; married in D.C.
- Sam Denby (born 1998), YouTuber; born and raised in D.C.
- Julie Nixon Eisenhower (born 1948), daughter of President Richard Nixon; born in D.C.
- Andrew Fastow (born 1961), chief financial officer of Enron Corporation; born in D.C.
- Albert Fish (1870–1936), cannibalistic serial killer and rapist; born in D.C.
- Charles Brenton Fisk (1925–1983), organ builder; born in D.C.
- Bill France Jr. (1933–2007), CEO of NASCAR; born in D.C.
- Bill France Sr. (1909–1992), founder and CEO of NASCAR; born in D.C.
- John R. Francis (1856–1913), physician and educator at Howard University; born in D.C.
- William D. Gibbons (c. 1825–1886), minister at D.C.'s Zion Baptist Church
- Steven B. Gould (born 1966), lawyer and judge from Maryland; born in D.C.
- Shauntay Hinton, Miss USA 2002, Miss District of Columbia 2002; educated in D.C.
- J. Edgar Hoover (1895–1972), FBI director; born in D.C.
- Charlene Drew Jarvis (born 1941), educator and president of Southeastern University; born in D.C.
- Kerry Kennedy (born 1959), human rights advocate; born in D.C.
- Bruce Levenson (born 1949), businessman, philanthropist, and former owner of the Atlanta Hawks; born in D.C.
- J.W. Marriott Jr. (born 1932), chairman and CEO of Marriott International; born in D.C.
- Clarence Moore (1865–1912), businessman; D.C. resident from 1890
- Queen Noor of Jordan (born 1951), born in D.C.
- Perry Redd (born 1964), social activist and organizer, and songwriter; born in D.C.
- Vincent Reed (born 1928), former assistant secretary of education under President Ronald Reagan; superintendent of the District of Columbia Public Schools
- Tony Ressler (born 1960), billionaire and owner of the Atlanta Hawks; born in D.C.
- Andrew Tate (born 1986), American-British media personality, businessman, and former professional kickboxer born in D.C.
- Alethia Tanner (1781–1864), educator, businesswoman and community leader; resident from the early 1800s
- Lauren Tuchman (born 1986), rabbi and disability rights activist, raised in D.C.
- Maryly Van Leer (1930–2011), university president and founder, women's rights activist, born in D.C.
- Stanley Woodward, attorney

== See also ==
- List of current United States representatives
- List of current United States senators
- List of justices of the Supreme Court of the United States
- List of presidents of the United States
- List of vice presidents of the United States
- List of Washington, D.C., suffragists
