= Andrew Hero Jr. =

United States Army general (1868–1942)

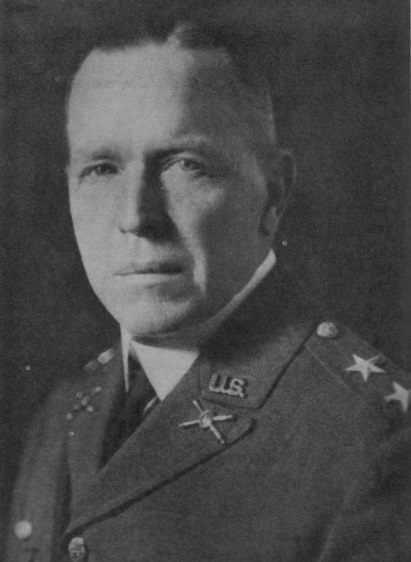
- Major General Andrew Hero Jr., Chief of Coast Artillery from 1926 to 1930
- Born: December 13, 1868; New Orleans, Louisiana
- Died: February 7, 1942 (aged 73); Washington, D.C.
- Burial place: Arlington National Cemetery
- Spouse: Fanny Caroline Davis (m. 1897)
- Military career
- Allegiance: United States of America
- Branch: United States Army
- Service years: 1891–1930
- Rank: Major General
- Commands: 85th Coast Artillery Company; Fort Flagler, Washington; Fort Terry, New York; Fort Kamehameha, Hawaii; Fort Ruger, Hawaii; 154th Field Artillery Brigade; 39th Coast Artillery Brigade; Panama Coast Artillery District; Fort Mills Coast Artillery Garrison; 4th Coast Artillery District; Chief of Coast Artillery
- Conflicts: Spanish–American War; World War I

Andrew Hero Jr. (December 13, 1868 – February 7, 1942) was a major general in the United States Army who was prominent for his service as Chief of Coast Artillery.

== Early life ==
Andrew Hero Jr. was born in New Orleans, Louisiana on December 13, 1868. His father, Andrew Hero, was a soldier in the Confederate States Army, and served in the Washington Artillery.

The younger Andrew Hero was educated in New Orleans and attended Tulane University and the School of Mines at Columbia University before becoming a student at the United States Military Academy. He graduated eighth in a class of 65 in 1891 and was commissioned as a second lieutenant of Infantry.

== Start of career ==
Hero's first assignment was with the 12th Infantry at Fort Yates, North Dakota. In late 1891 he transferred to the Field Artillery, and was assigned to the 4th Artillery at Fort McPherson, Georgia. In 1894 he attended the Artillery School at Fort Monroe, Virginia, and after graduation in 1896 he was assigned to the faculty, where he served until 1898.

== Spanish–American War ==
At the start of the Spanish–American War, Hero was appointed aide-de-camp to Brigadier General Joseph P. Sanger, commander of 3rd Division, First Army Corps, and served in Cuba until June 1899.

== Post-Spanish–American War ==
After leaving Cuba, Hero was assigned to the 5th Artillery, with duty as an instructor at West Point.

In 1902 Hero was posted to the Artillery school at Fort Monroe and assigned as a member of the Artillery Board, which considered changes to Artillery equipment, doctrine and training, as well as assistant editor and later editor of the Journal of the United States Artillery.

== Later career ==
In 1907 Hero was posted to Fort Casey, Washington, where he served as commander of the 85th Coast Artillery Company until 1908, when he was promoted to major and assigned as commander of Fort Flagler, Washington.

Hero was ordered to Washington, D.C. in 1909 to serve as assistant to the Chief of Coast Artillery. In 1911 he was assigned as adjutant of the 1st Separate Brigade in Galveston, Texas.

In 1913 the Army established several Coast Artillery Districts, and Hero was appointed adjutant of the South Atlantic District in Charleston, South Carolina.

In 1915 Hero was promoted to lieutenant colonel and assigned to command of Fort Terry, New York. At Fort Terry, Hero organized a Military Training Camp for Boys, which was held in the summer of 1916. The MTCB was an extension of the Citizens' Military Training Camps, which provided military training and reserve officers' commissions during the lead up to World War I.

== World War I ==
In late 1916 Hero was promoted to colonel and assigned to command of Fort Kamehameha, and then Fort Ruger, both in Hawaii. In September 1917 he was promoted to temporary brigadier general and assigned to Fort Meade, Maryland as commander of the 154th Field Artillery Brigade, a unit of the 79th Division.

Hero's brigade underwent additional training upon arrival in France, and because of the Armistice it never entered combat as a unit. Hero was attached to the 153rd Field Artillery Brigade during the Meuse-Argonne Offensive, and in December 1918 was assigned to duty with the Chief of Artillery at the headquarters of the American Expeditionary Forces (AEF). His duties including presiding over a board (The Hero Board) which studied after action reports on field artillery weapons and tactics during the war, and made recommendations for improvements to doctrine and weapons development.

Hero completed the course at the Army Center of Artillery Studies in Trier, and returned to the United States in May, 1919.

== Post-World War I ==
After the war Hero reverted to the permanent rank of colonel, and commanded the 39th Coast Artillery Brigade, first at Fort Hamilton, New York, and later at Fort Jackson, South Carolina, followed by assignment as commander of the Panama Coast Artillery District.

In 1923 Hero was assigned to the Philippines, where he commanded the Fort Mills Coast Artillery Garrison on Corregidor from 1923 to 1925. In 1925 Hero was assigned as commander of the 4th Coast Artillery District at Fort McPherson, Georgia.

== Chief of Coast Artillery ==
In December 1925 Hero was selected to serve as Chief of Coast Artillery. He began his assignment in March 1926, and was promoted to major general. Hero served as head of the Coast Artillery branch until retiring from the Army in 1930. Hero was succeeded by John W. Gulick.

== Death and burial ==
In retirement Hero resided in Washington, D.C. He died in Washington on February 7, 1942, and was buried at Arlington National Cemetery.

== Family ==
In 1897 Hero married Fanny Caroline Davis (1871–1932), the daughter of Brigadier General John M. K. Davis. They were the parents of three children: Jacklyn (1899–1963), Elinor (1901–2000), and Andrew Hero III (1910–1943).

== Legacy ==
Camp Hero, a World War II coast defense facility at Montauk, New York was named for him after his death in 1942. The location is now the site of Camp Hero State Park.
