= John M. K. Davis =

U.S. Army officer

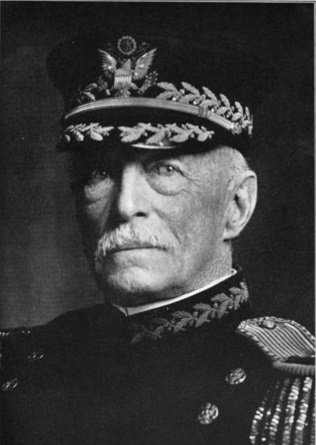
- From 1922's Fifty-second Annual Report, United States Military Academy Association of Graduates
- Born: January 31, 1844; Washington, D.C., U.S.
- Died: May 20, 1920 (aged 76); Hartford, Connecticut, U.S.
- Burial place: Arlington National Cemetery
- Education: Georgetown University; United States Military Academy
- Spouse: Frances Caroline Sanger (m. 1870–1917, her death)
- Children: 3
- Relatives: Joseph P. Sanger (brother in law); Andrew Hero Jr. (son in law)
- Military career
- Allegiance: Union; United States
- Service: Union Army; United States Army
- Service years: 1863 (Union Army); 1867–1908 (U.S. Army)
- Rank: Brigadier General
- Nickname: Jack
- Unit: U.S. Army Fileld Artillery Branch
- Commands: Artillery District of Puerto Rico; Artillery District of New London; Artillery District of Boston; Department of the Gulf
- Wars: American Civil War; Spanish–American War

John M. K. Davis (January 31, 1844 – May 20, 1920) was a career officer in the United States Army. A Union Army veteran of the American Civil War, after graduating from Georgetown University in 1862 and initial military service with the 3rd Maryland Cavalry Regiment in 1863, Davis attended the United States Military Academy. He graduated in 1867, and served until reaching the mandatory retirement age of 64 in January 1908. Davis served primarily in Field Artillery assignments, was a veteran of the Spanish–American War, and attained the rank of brigadier general.

A native of Washington, D.C., Davis graduated from Georgetown University in 1862 and served in the 3rd Maryland Cavalry Regiment at the start of the American Civil War. Appointed to the United States Military Academy later that year, he graduated in 1867 and was appointed a second lieutenant in the 1st Regiment of Artillery. Davis carried out coastal artillery assignments, primarily on the east coast of the United States, and was an instructor at West Point and at the Field Artillery School at Fort Monroe, Virginia. He carried out inspector general assignments at the start of the Spanish–American War, and commanded several districts and departments before reaching the mandatory retirement age of 64 in 1908.

In retirement, Davis was a resident of New London, Connecticut. He died at his son's home in Hartford, Connecticut, on May 20, 1920, and was buried at Arlington National Cemetery.

== Early life ==
John Moore Kelso Davis was born in Washington, D.C., on January 31, 1844, the son of Martha Anderson Kelso Davis (1804–1879) and Dr. Alexander McDonald Davis (1807–1872). He attended the schools of Washington and graduated from Gonzaga College High School in 1858. In 1862, he received his Bachelor of Arts degree from Georgetown University.

In 1863, Davis joined the Union Army for the American Civil War and received his commission as a first lieutenant in the 3rd Maryland Cavalry Regiment. He was stationed at Fort Delaware, Delaware, during the summer of 1863. In April 1863, Davis's sister visited President Abraham Lincoln to request that Davis be appointed to the United States Military Academy. In September, Davis was offered an appointment, which he accepted. He graduated in June 1867 ranked 17th of 63 and received his commission as a second lieutenant of Field Artillery.

== Start of career ==
Davis was initially assigned to the 1st Regiment of Artillery and Fort Schuyler, New York. From December 1867 to April 1869 he was a student at the Field Artillery School at Fort Monroe, Virginia. Davis then carried out Artillery assignments at Fort Hamilton, New York (May to July 1869), Fort Schuyler, New York (July 1869 to September 1870), and Fort Wood, New York (September 1870 to July 1871).

From July to August 1871, Davis briefly served as an assistant instructor of Artillery tactics, after which he returned to duty at Fort Hamilton, where he remained until March 1872. Davis was promoted to first lieutenant in December 1871. From March to August 1872, Davis was assigned as aide-de-camp to Major General Philip St. George Cooke, the commander of the army's Department of the Lakes, which was headquartered in Detroit, Michigan. He was assigned as assistant instructor of Infantry tactics at West Point from August 1872 to August 1876.

== Continued career ==
Davis served at Fort Sill, Indian Territory in October and November 1876. He was then assigned to the garrison at Washington Arsenal in Washington, D.C., where he remained until February 1877, after which he served on the staff of the Artillery School at Fort Monroe. In August 1877, Davis was assigned as adjutant of the 1st Artillery Regiment, a position he held from August 1877 to April 1887, including postings to Fort Adams, Rhode Island, and the Presidio of San Francisco, California.

From April 1887 to March 1888, Davis served at Vancouver Barracks, Washington and he was promoted to captain in January 1888. He served again at the Presidio of San Francisco until May 1888, then served as an instructor in engineering at the Artillery School from June 1888 to May 1898.

== Later career ==
In May 1898, Davis joined the United States Volunteers for the Spanish–American War and was commissioned as an inspector general with the rank of major. He was inspector general of 2nd Division, First Army Corps at Chickamauga, Georgia from May to August 1898, and inspector general of the Department of the Gulf in Atlanta, Georgia from August 1898 to October 1899. Davis was discharged from the Volunteers in May 1899. He was promoted to permanent major in the 5th Artillery in October 1899, then transferred to the 1st Artillery.

Davis was assistant inspector general of the Department of the East at Governors Island, New York from November 1899 to September 1901. In August 1901, he was promoted to lieutenant colonel. Davis commanded the Artillery District of Puerto Rico from October 1901 to May 1902. From June 1902 to August 1905, he was commander of the Artillery District of New London, and he was promoted to colonel in August 1903. He was assigned to command the Artillery District of Boston from August 1905 to May 1907. In May 1907, Davis was promoted to brigadier general, and he commanded the Department of the Gulf from July 1907 to January 1908. Davis retired on January 31, 1908, in accordance with the law requiring army officers to retire at age 64.

== Retirement and death ==
In retirement, Davis was a resident of New London, Connecticut, and spent summers at a vacation home in New Hampshire. In 1916, Davis and his wife lost their baggage in a hotel fire while they were spending the winter in Maitland, Florida. He died at the home of his son Kelso in Hartford, Connecticut, on May 20, 1920. He was buried at Arlington National Cemetery.

== Family ==
In June 1870, Davis married Frances Caroline Sanger (1848–1917), the sister of Major General Joseph P. Sanger. They were the parents of three children, Fanny, John, and Franck. Fanny (1871–1932) was the wife of Major General Andrew Hero Jr. John Henry Kelso Davis (1875 1956) was known as Kelso and became a Hartford, Connecticut, printing company executive. He was a longtime member of the National Guard and Organized Reserve who retired as a brigadier general. Franck Everly Taylor Davis was born in 1887 and died in 1898.
