= Benoit Maubrey =

- Born: 1952 (age 73–74); Washington D.C
- Known for: Dance, Music, Sculpture, Technology
- Style: Electroaccoustic Sculptor

Benoit Maubrey is an often exhibited contemporary American artist born in 1952. While Maubrey falls under the technical title of a sculptor, he labels himself as the creator of "electroacoustic sculptures." These sculptures combine both three-dimensional work and sound in different variations of performance and sculpture. he has made contributions to the fields of dance, sculpture, sound, and technology by combining all three in his "Audio Ballerinas." The "Audio Ballerinas" are particularly important because not only do they eliminate the distinct separation between the performer and the audience by the stage, they also allow the dancers to create the music and dance at the same time. This is vastly different from percussion dance groups, such as the popular group STOMP, because they create a new auditory and visual language in the art world. Currently, Maubrey is the director of a traveling Berlin-based art group called DIE AUDIOd GUPPE.

== Sculptures ==
There are three main categories that Maubrey's sculptures fall under. The first one is a gate/wall/structure built of speakers. The second reimagines everyday objects being replaced by speakers and the third has sculptures emitting sound.

== The Evolution of the Audio Ballerinas ==
Maubrey's wearable acoustic systems started back in 1982 when he bought some second-hand clothing and attached loudspeakers, amplifiers, batteries and walkmans to these clothes. A few years later in 1989, the electronic tutu first emerged when he started playing around with solar panels. A dancer friend of his visited his studio and remarked on how similar it looked to a tutu.

The first rendition of the tutus operated on solar panels and created sound based on the professional dancer's movement and the surrounding light available in the environment. This allowed for music production and dance to be created as one unit instead of two separate things. Traditionally, western dance would be performed on a stage and the music in the pit by either a symphony or orchestra. The music would be conceived and written first and then, the dance on stage would be choreographed. Around Maubrey's time the same was true even of street performance artists. The music would already be in existence and the dancer would react to it. Here, both occur simultaneously. Not only that but, the dance is what makes the music and the traditional order is flipped.

The next addition involved the use of metal rakes that would scrape along the ground and being attached to sensors would create different sounds based on pressure, texture of surfaces, and speed. This not only allows for the dancers to create the music but also the environment. So, no longer is the performance separated from the things surrounding it but instead, exists in the then and there and cannot be exactly replicated.

Then, Maubrey took it step further. Now, the dancers themselves created, dictated, and controlled what sound was being made, instead of the light or the environment. The black bands on her arms and torso are sensors that react and make certain sounds based on movements. The dancer has to learn the specific movements and the associated sounds and thus, focuses more on the creation of music instead of just the movement with sound being the side effect. This allows the dancer to not only captivate the visual but also the auditory component.

Another aspect to allowing the dancers control over making and mixing the music on spot is making sound visualized. One does not see a vibrating pulsing line most associated with computer programs that let us see the audio line. Instead, a specific visual language is created with not only movement but also sound. This is different from other performance groups that seek to make music and dance at the same time such as the popular group known as STOMP.

The difference between the two, is that STOMP uses a visual and auditory language that already exists. A person stomps their foot, a loud thump is made. A person hits a trashcan with a drumstick, an almost snare like effect is created. Their focus is less on dance and more on the music. They simply replace traditional instruments with common objects and focus on percussion which is closely linked to already existing tribal dances.

A further separation between STOMP and Maubrey's tutus can be seen in the next generation of the tutu which not only includes movement based sensors but also samplers and microphones. This allows for the audience and the environment to create auditory input and for the dancer to record it, replay it, and to change it with dance and a mixing device. Thus, the dancer has the option to create music and then react to it or to do the two simultaneously. Allowing their movements to do the mixing. This includes other instrument, as seen here, the human voice, environmental sounds, etc. Thus, increasing audience involvement and possible participation further removing the distinction between the audience and stage.

The removal of this distinction also affects the dancers authorship. With audience involvement and the environmental factors it becomes less of a solo performance and more of a collaboration. Some of these collaborators are conscious of being involved but, due to the sensitivity of the microphones, passersby become unknowingly part of the show by either their footsteps, their car, even a clearing of a throat.

The final real change that occurred in the electronic tutus before they evolved into another form completely was the inclusion of the radio receivers. These receivers were powered by solar panels, going back towards Maubrey's original ideas, and these receivers picked up radio waves by the way that the dancers positioned their bodies in sunlight. These solar panels were attached to the dancer's head and arms. The difference between this edition of the solar powered tutu and the first rendition of it is that by using radio waves, the dancer could pick up actual radio stations and white noise. Thus, the environment is not the only collaborator with the dancer but instead, the light itself, when partnered with radio waves, becomes a dance partner that the dancer has to react to and work with.

These audio ballerinas break through the barriers between music and dance, performance and audience, and technology and tradition. A perfect example of mixing technology and tradition can be seen in the next evolution of sound clothes, the audio geisha. Created in 1997, the audio geishas include light sensors on the kimono and the dancers hands, movement sensors, a small portable guitar amplifier, microphones, infrared sensors, and radio receivers.

The geishas created music similarly to the audio ballerinas but, they also used traditional instruments often associated with their dances. Another additional detail is that the audio ballerinas were also incorporated in the performance.

In all, Maubrey's sound tutus and geishas seek to redefine the relationship between the auditory, visual, and performative arts with the use of developing technology in order to break down barriers.

== History of Exhibitions and Performances ==
Maubrey has exhibited several times a year since 1985 in mostly the Western world.

Year	Event/Gallery Name	Place
1985		
	Bundesgartenschau 85	Berlin, Germany
	Berlin in the Gasteig Art Center	Munich, Germany
	Alternativa IV	Lisbon, Portugal
1986		
	ARS ELECTRONICA	Linz, Austria
	The Mattress Factory	Pitssburg, PA, United States
	Berlin Atonal Festival	Berlin, Germany
1987		
	STEIRISCHE HERBST	Graz, Austria
	Galerie Giannozzo	Berlin, Germany
1988		
	Festival des Arts Electroniques	Rennes, France
	Parcours Sonores, Musee de la Villette	Paris, France
	Festival of European Street Theatre	Aurillac, France
1989		
	Festival PERSPECTIVES	Saarbrücken, Germany
1990		
	Festival les Arts au Soleil	Aeronef Lille, France.
	Sound Symposium, St. John's	Newfoundland, Canada
	“Urbane Aboriginale”	Berlin, Germany
1991		
	European Land Art Biennale	Cottbus, Germany
	INTERFERENZEN– Art from West Berlin	Riga, Lettland, Latvia
1992		
	Cleveland Performance Festival	Cleveland, Ohio, United States
	The Night of Electricity	Rotterdam, Netherlands
	Third International Symposium for Electronic Ar,	Sydney, Australia
1993		
	MEDIALE	Hamburg, Germany
	Art and Computers, University of Moscow	Moscow, Russia
	“Augenlied”, Schloß Pluschow	Mecklenburgische Künstlerhaus, Germany
	BECK Forum	Munich, Germany
	ULTIMA Festiva	Oslo, Norway
1994		
	“Audio Drama”, Theatre zum Westlichen Staathirschen	Berlin, Germany
	International Symposium for Electronic Art	Helsinki, Finland
	German Television Video Prize, SWF,	Baden-Baden, Germany
1995		
	Kraków (THE KRAKOVIAN MEETINGS ).	Kakrow, Poland
	Sound Art Festival	Hannover, Germany
1996		
	Sound Art Festival, Kraków.	Kakrow, Poland
1997		
	AUDIO GEISHAS, ICC-NTT Tokyo City Opera House.	Tokyo, Japan
	ISEA	Chicago, Illinois, United States
	Ostranenie Festival, Stiftung Bauhaus / Dessau.	
	XIX International Triennale Exhibition of Milan.	
	SONAMBIENTE Sound Art Festival, Academy of Arts, Berlin.	
	International Street Theatre Festival, Holzminden (1st Prize for “Mobility and Flexibility”).	
	“Audio Ballerinas and Electronic Guys” Tour/ USA, The KITCHEN (NYC), Scena Theatre (Washington, D.C.), Buskers Fare (NYC).	
	KRYPTONAL Festival, Berlin.	
	38eme Rugissants, Grenoble.	
1998		
	MALTA Festival, Poznan, Poland	
	Stockton Riverside Festival, UK.	
	International Symposium for Electronic Arts, Chicago.	
	“Audio Ballerinas and Electronic Guys” USA tour, The Kitchen (NYC).	
	MALTA Festival, Poznan, Poland.	
	Stedelijk Museum, Amsterdam	
1999		
	IDAT (International Dance and Technology Conference), Phoenix, Arizona.	
	Danzdag, Kulturhus Aarhus, Denmark.	
	"Audio Ballerinas and Electronic Guys", Theatre am Hallesches Ufer / Berlin.	
	AUDIO IGLOO, commissioned electro-acoustic sculpture at Hull Time Based Arts, UK.	
	Les Nuits Savoureuses de Belfort, France.	
2000		
	Monaco Dance Danses Forum, Montecarlo.	
	Kulturbro Festival (Ystad, 2000).	
	Tollwood Festival, Munich.	
	Potsdamer Musikfestspiele, Potsdam.	
	Geisha 3.0, Dock 11, Berlin.	
2001		
	Kunstmuseum Wolfsburg	
	Berliner Festspiele	
	New Haven Festival for Arts and Ideas	
	Seoul Performing Arts Festival	
	Medi@terra, Athens	
	Musee des Arts et Industrie, Saint-Etienne	
	FETA Festival, Gdansk	
2002		
	AUDIO BALLERINAS, Location One, NYC.	
	HIGH FIDELITY production, Musiktheater im Revier, Gelsennkirchen (co-production mit Berndt Schindowski)	
	AUDIO PEACOCKS, Artist in Residence at Lieux Publics, Marseille.	
	Hamburger Bahnhof, Museum fuer Gegenwartskunst, Berlin.	
	Potsdamer Festspiele.	
2003		
2004		
	“Sonoric Atmospheres”/Ostseebiennale der Klangkunst.	
	AUDIO IGLOO, sound sculpture in the Singuhr-Hörgalerie, Parochial Church/Berlin.	
	Thailand New Media Art Festival/Bangkok.	
	“Soundscape & Shadow” Musikfestival, Denkmalschmiede Höfgen	
	Lowlands Festival., Holland	
	Schweriner Kultursommer.	
	LEM Festival (Gracia Territoria Sonor), Barcelona	
	BUGA Park Potsdam, AUDIO PEACOCKS, gARTen event.	
2005		
	CORPUS Festival, Brugge, Belgien.	
	The ELECTRONIC GUY solo Tour, Vancouver (Video In), NYC (Location 1).	
	Die Blaue Nacht, Nurnberg.	
2006		
	ROBODOK Festival, Amsterdam.	
	Taipei Digital Arts Festival, Taiwan.	
	Sitelines Festival, NYC.	
	Lange Mozart Nacht, Augsburg.	
	SIGGRAPH, Boston.	
	Digital Arts Week, Zurich.	
2007		
	IM AUGE DES KLANGS, Schloss Moyland/ Joseph Beuys Archive.	
	INGENUITY, Cleveland Festival for Arts and Technology. Audio Ballerinas	
	Digital Arts Week, Zurich.	
2008		
	MOSTRA DES ARTES SESC/ São Paulo, Brazil. Audio Ballerinas	
	Hohenrausch Festival/ Rostock. Video Peacocks/ CyberBirds	
	MUSICA EX MACHINA/ Bilbao. Audio Ballerinas	
	Festival Musique de Rue, Besançon. Audio Ballerinas + Audio Peacock	
2009		
	NAISA, Toronto. Feedback Fred + Audio Ballerina	
	Berlinische Galerie, Berlin.Audio Ballerinas	
2010		
	TONSPUR_expanded: the Loudspeaker/Vienna, the AUDIO GUILLOTINE	
	ObArt Festival, Kirschau/Bautzen, SORBEN 3000 (Performances) and SPEAKERS GATE	
	Le Jardin d’O, Montpellier.Audio Ballerinas	
	Zero1 Festival, San Jose Biennale, San Jose Ca. Audio Ballerinas	
2011		
	SPOR festival Aarhus, Ballet a Larsen Project.	
	Festival Accroche-Coeurs, Angers (F). (Audio Ballerinas, Audio Cyclists, Audio Geishas, Plantagenets 3000 + MUR SONORE Sound Sculpture).	
2012		
	ZKM / Karlsruhe, SOUND ART. TEMPLE Sound Sculpture.	
	STATT FARBE: LICHT Festival Bauhaus/Dessau (Audio Ballerinas + Audio Peacocks).	
	Temporäres Kunstprojekt in Helle Mitte, Hellersdorf/Berlin (Audio Ballerinas + Audio Peacocks).	
2013		
	Skulpturenmuseum Glaskasten Marl. AUDIO IGLOO Sound Sculpture.	
	European Cultural Capital / Kosice, Slovakia (Audio Ballerinas).	
	Hard Rock Hotel, Palm Springs Ca. THE CUBE Sound Sculpture.	
2014		
	MarzMusik/ Berliner Festspiele. GATEWAY Sound sculpture.	
2015		
	Kobe Biennale.	
	Brno International Music Festival.	
	Deutsches Technikmuseum Berlin.	

== Awards ==
Honorary Mention in the 1991 Prix Ars Electronicia.

European Award for Street Theatre/Holzminden in 1995.

Grand Prix International Video Danse in 2002.

Palmarès du 35e Concours Internationaux de Musique et d’Art Sonore Electroacoustiques de Bourges in 2004 and 2009.

Franklin Furnace Fund for Performance NYC in 2006.

Marler Video Installations Prize in 2008.

Sound Art Grant from the City of Berlin 2016
