= Inez Demonet =

American artist and medical illustrator

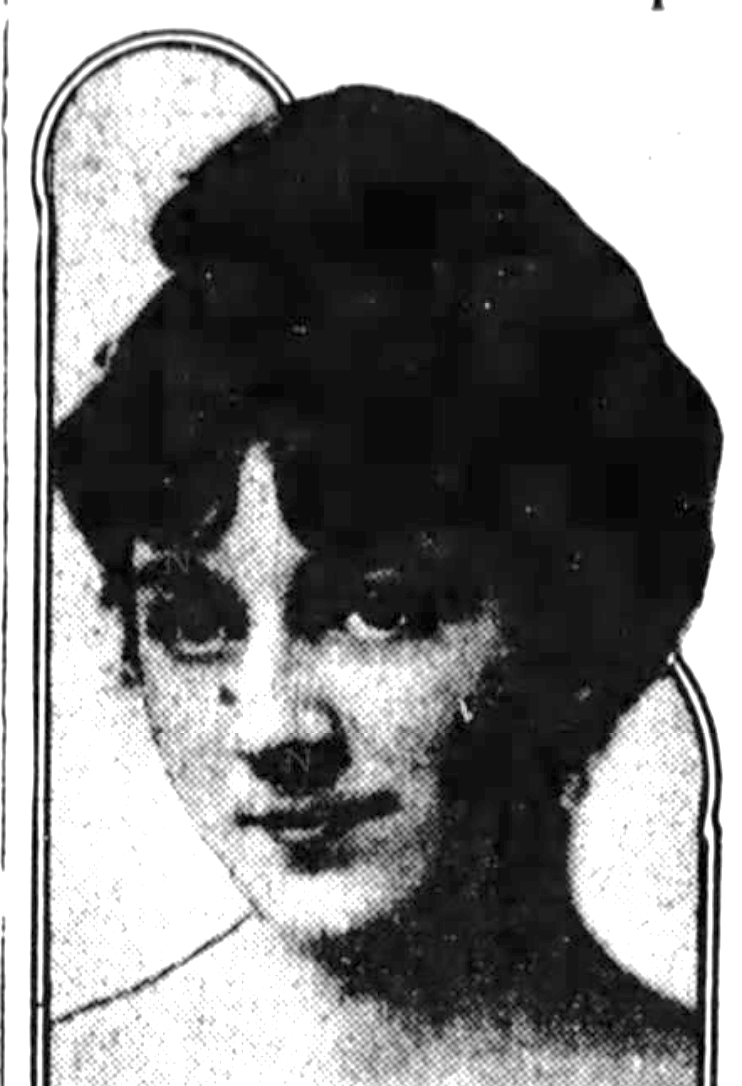
- Demonet in 1915
- Born: April 25, 1897; Washington, D.C., US
- Died: 1980 (aged 82–83); Green Valley, Arizona, US
- Education: Corcoran School of Art, National School of Fine & Applied Arts
- Known for: medical illustration
- Spouse: Cecil S. O'Brien

Inez Michon Demonet (April 25, 1897 – 1980) was an American painter and medical illustrator known for establishing modern Medical Arts at the National Institutes of Health.

== Early life ==
She was born Inez Michon Demonet in 1897 in Washington, D.C., to George H. Demonet and Emily Demonet. Her father was French and her mother was Belgian. She went to the Corcoran School of Art, where she won a medal for excellence, and the National School of Fine & Applied Arts. Her specialty was maxillofacial and plastic surgery illustration.

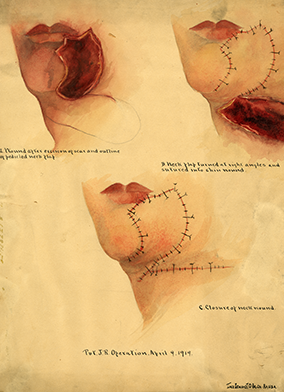
Facial Reconstruction Surgery image by Inez Demonet O'Brien April 9, 1919

During World War I, she created watercolors of facial injuries and surgeries for the U.S. War Department. She married Cecil S. O'Brien, a navy surgeon, in Baltimore on April 21, 1915, but they did not stay married long.

== Career ==
She became the only artist in residence at the Hygienic Laboratory (now the NIH) in 1926, working her way up to chief of the Medical Arts department in 1938, the first person to hold that position. Her work included illustrations for journals such as the Journal of the National Malaria Society whose authors called her work "as accurate a representation of the actual appearance... as it is possible to attain." Her illustrations for the book Manual of Microscopical Diagnosis were called "true masterpieces" when describing illustrations of the morphology of stained parasites.

She occasionally did other non-medical illustrations, such as for The Anatomy and Physiology of the Light Organ in Fireflies published in the journal Bioluminescence in 1948. From 1960 through 1965, she worked as a Fine and Applied Arts Consultant for Medical Arts, working on the interiors of buildings in the DC area.

Demonet was a founding member of the Association of Medical Illustrators (AMI). The AMI gives an annual scholarship in her name to an applicant with "highest academic and personal achievements in the field of visual communications in the health sciences" in programs accredited by AMI. She retired from NIH in 1965 and moved to Green Valley, Arizona in 1971.

== Artistic work ==
Demonet also worked in other mediums and was a member of the Washington Water Color Club, the Society of Washington Printmakers, and the Society of Tropical Medicine and Hygiene.

Her hand-colored etching Rickshaw Coolie – Shanghai is in the Smithsonian American Art Museum. Two of her etchings are held by The Booth Family Center for Special Collections at Georgetown University and some of her etchings were purchased by President Roosevelt.
