= Frederick Reuss =

American writer

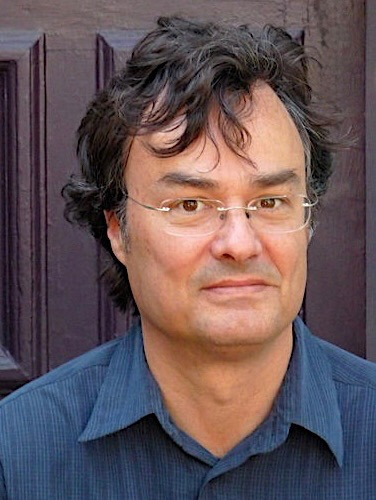
Frederick Reuss

Frederick Reuss (born 1960) is an American writer and author of six seriocomic novels, including his debut, Horace Afoot (1997), which was named a New York Times Notable Book. Reuss' writing has been called "cosmopolitan, contemplative, contemporary prose." All of his novels explore the question of whether modern personal identity is still inviolable and, if so, how it is affected by external, cultural forces. He is best known for Mohr (2006), a highly regarded work of speculative fiction based on a collection of letters, papers, and vintage family photographs owned by the playwright Max Mohr (1891–1937), a German-Jewish physician who exiled himself to Shanghai in the early 1930s as the Nazis were coming to power in Germany. On reading Mohr, art critic John Berger remarked that Reuss' "aerialist's sense of history, his sleight of hand, his animal knowledge of political practice, his silver tact and his cool tenderness make his performance nothing less than Orphic."

== Novels ==
- Horace Afoot. Denver: MacMurray & Beck, 1997 WorldCat
- Henry of Atlantic City: A Novel. NY: MacMurray & Beck, 1999 WorldCat
- The Wasties: A Novel. NY: Pantheon, 2002 WorldCat
- Mohr. Denver: Unbridled Books, 2007 WorldCat
- A Geography of Secrets. Denver: Unbridled Books, 2010 WorldCat
- Maisie at 8000 Feet: A Novel. Denver: Unbridled Books, 2016 WorldCat

== Other writing ==
Reuss' decades-long association with the Department of Anthropology in the National Museum of Natural History, Smithsonian Institution has resulted in several non-fiction works. In Saynday Was Coming Along... (1993), Reuss retold a collection of Kiowa trickster tales collected in the late 19th century by U.S. Army officer Hugh L. Scott; the work accompanied a Smithsonian traveling exhibition of drawings by the Kiowa artist Silver Horn. Reuss also contributed to A Guide to the Kiowa Collections at the Smithsonian Institution (1997), the product of a collaborative research project exploring the extensive Kiowa art and ethnology collections maintained by the Department of Anthropology.

== Interviews and addresses ==
- David Lazar. "Fact, Truth, and Fiction: An Interview with Novelist Frederick Reuss." Bulletin of the German Historical Institute, Vol 40 (Spring 2007), pp. 52–68.
- "A Geography of Secrets Author Explores His Secrets during Radio Interview." CSM Connections. February 28, 2011.
- "The Question, What is a Map? Is More Relevant than Ever." The National Map Users Conference. Opening remarks and plenary speakers, Thursday, May 12, 2011.

== Life ==
Born in Addis Ababa, Ethiopia in 1960, while his father, a career foreign service officer with the United States Information Agency (USIA), was stationed there. Reuss spent much of his youth in India and Germany. He holds a BA in political philosophy from Antioch College (1983) and lives in Washington, DC.
