= Benson Moore =

American sketcher and portrait painter

- Born: Benson Bond Moore; 13 August 1882; Washington D.C., United States
- Died: 1 November 1974 (aged 92); Sarasota, Florida, United States
- Education: Corcoran School of Art, Linthicum Institute
- Known for: Painter

Benson Bond Moore (13 August 1882 – 1 November 1974) was a Native American painter from the United States most noted for drawing sketches and portrait paintings of animals and landscapes.

== Early life and education ==
Benson Bond Moore was born in Washington D.C. on August 13, 1882. Moore grew up in an artistic environment and learned art restoration and framing from his father who provided those services to prominent political figures in the Washington D.C. area.

Moore studied at the Corcoran School of Art with Edmund Messer, Richard Brooke and Max Weyl, teachers who were part of the late-nineteenth-century landscape school, and at the Linthicum Institute under Ballenger.

== Later life and work ==
In the late 1930s, Moore became involved in the art restoration trade that his father had conducted for 60 years. His father had been involved in the framing and reconditioning of White House paintings since the Grant administration. For Moore, art restoration gradually evolved into a full-time pursuit with him repainting and touching up originals by artists including Rembrandt, Velasquez, Gainsborough and van Dyck. In 1958, Moore was considered a notable tourist attraction while restoring The Embarkation of the Pilgrims by Robert Weir, a painting which covered a major portion of the United States Capitol rotunda.

After his wife's passing in the 1950s, Moore relocated to Sarasota, where he continued to work until his death on November 1, 1974.

== Work in notable collections ==
- Library of Congress, Washington D.C.
- Maryland Center for History and Culture, Baltimore, Maryland
- Museum of Fine Arts, Houston, Texas
- Museum of Florida History, Tallahassee, Florida
- National Library of New Zealand, Wellington, New Zealand
- Smithsonian American Art Museum, Washington D.C., United States
  - Archives of American Art, Washington D.C.
- United States Department of State, Washington D.C.
