= Will H. Chandlee =

American painter

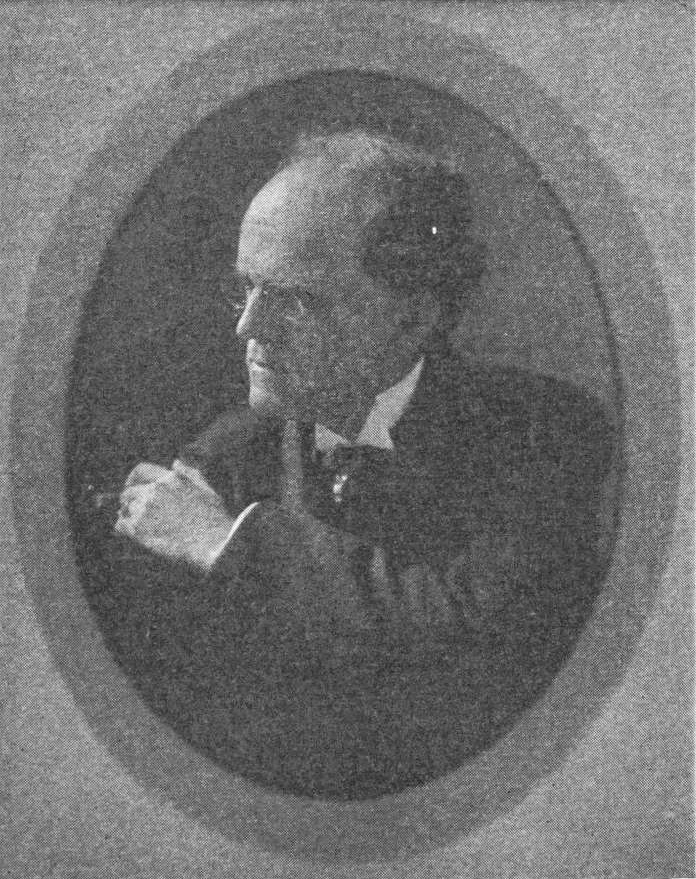
Will H. Chandlee

William H. Chandlee (1865 – May 9, 1954) was an American painter and illustrator who worked in Washington, D.C. He was the art manager of The Evening Star for 20 years.

== Career ==
Chandlee was born in Washington D. C. in 1865. In 1887, he exhibited his portrait of Li Hongzhang at an exhibition of the Water Color Club by the Society of Washington Artists. At this exhibition, he also exhibited a black and white sketch titled the Mountain Road that included a local subject. "tumble-down shanties" and the dome of the United States Capitol. Chandlee was the illustrator of the book Now-A-Day Poems (1900) by Philander Chase Johnson. As of 1913, Chandlee was the director of the Chandlee Washington School of Illustrating. In 1922, he was the director of the Washington School of Art. He was the art manager of The Evening Star for 20 years.

Chandlee was published in Pearson's Magazine in:

- December 1904: The American House of Lords by David S. Barry
- January 1906: The Power of the Press by David S. Barry
- Taught at the Washington School of Art 1923-26
- Author and Illustrator of 1936 book "Mother Goose in Washington: A Story of Old King Dole and His Humpty Dumpty Court."

== Personal life ==
Chandlee was married and had at least one daughter. He died in Washington on May 9, 1954 at the age of 89.
