= Joseph P. Sanger =

U.S. Army major general

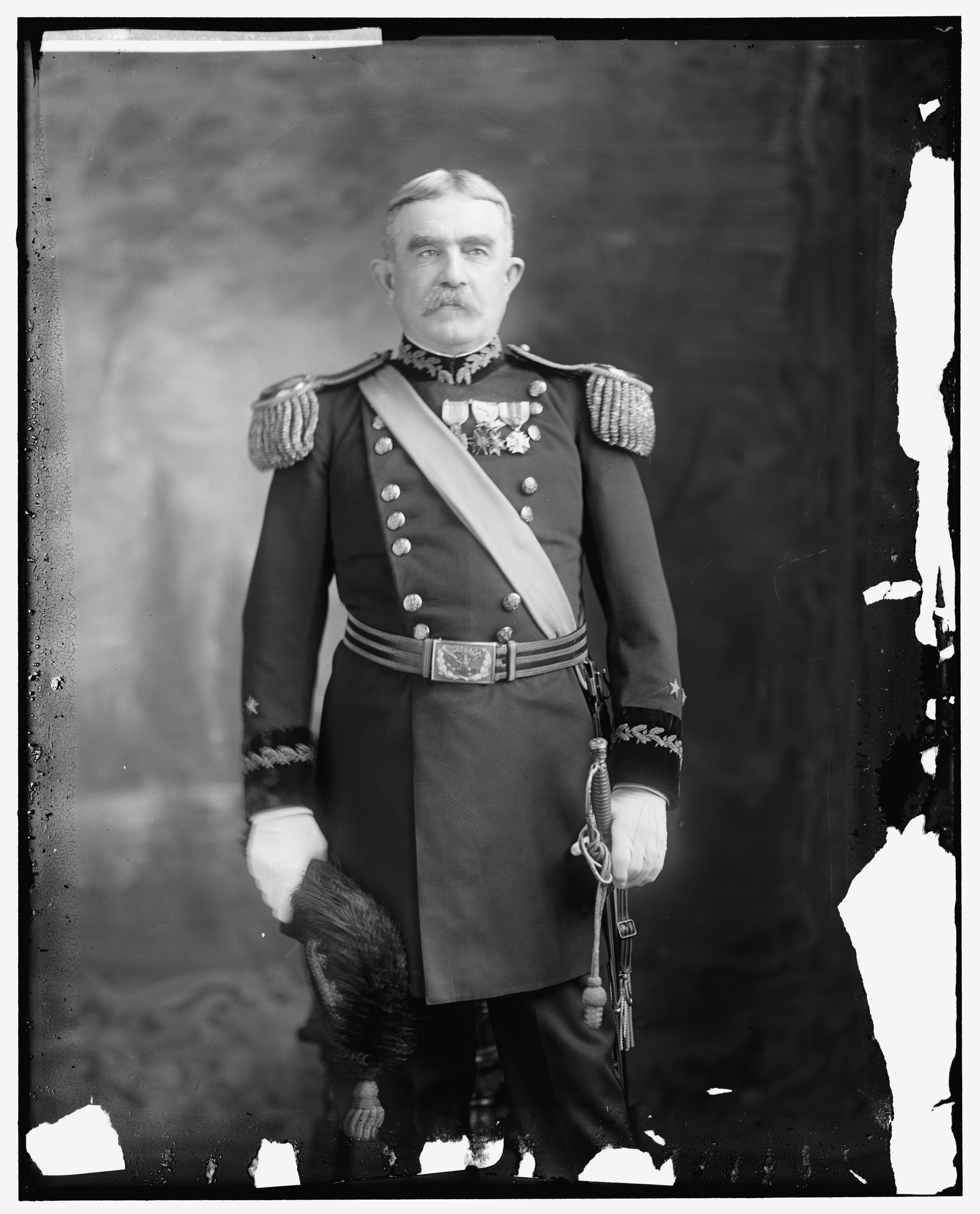
- Born: May 4, 1840; Detroit, Michigan, U.S.
- Died: March 15, 1926 (aged 85); Washington, D.C., U.S.
- Burial place: Arlington National Cemetery
- Alma mater: University of Michigan (attended)
- Spouse: Frances (Kent) Sanger (m. 1877–1926, his death)
- Children: 3
- Military career
- Allegiance: Union; United States
- Service: Union Army (1861–1865); United States Army (1865–1904)
- Service years: 1861–1904
- Rank: Major General
- Unit: U.S. Army Field Artillery Branch
- Commands: Battery D, 1st Regiment of Artillery; Battery E, 3rd Artillery; Light Battery, 1st Artillery; 2nd Brigade, 2nd Division, First Army Corps; 3rd Brigade, 2nd Division, First Army Corps; 3rd Division, First Army Corps; 2nd Division, First Army Corps; District of Matanzas; Director of the Census of Puerto Rico and Cuba; Director of the Census of the Philippines
- Wars: American Civil War; Spanish–American War; Philippine–American War

Joseph P. Sanger (May 4, 1840 – March 15, 1926) was a career officer in the United States Army. A Union Army veteran of the American Civil War, after the war he served as an aide-de-camp for generals Emory Upton and John Schofield, and was secretary and military assistant for President Abraham Lincoln and President Benjamin Harrison. He was very good friends with John Hay, Secretary of State under William McKinley and Theodore Roosevelt. After service in Cuba during the Spanish–American War, in 1903, he was assigned to supervise the first census of the Philippines following the end of the Philippine–American War. Sanger attained the rank of major general, and retired in January 1904.

Sanger was from an old and prominent New England family, and was born in Detroit, Michigan. He attended the University of Michigan for two years before joining the Union Army for the American Civil War. After service in the 1st Michigan Infantry Regiment, a unit enlisted for three months at the start of the war, Sanger joined the 1st Regiment of Artillery, with which he served until the end of the war. Sanger remained in the army after the war, and served in a variety of assignments as he rose through the ranks in the 1870s and 1880s, including command of several batteries of the 1st Artillery.

In addition to his artillery assignments, Sanger also served as an aide-de-camp for General Emory Upton during Upton's inspection and observation tour of Asia and Europe in the mid-1870s, and General John Schofield during Schofield's command of the Military Division of the Atlantic and assignment as Commanding General of the United States Army. During the presidential administration of Benjamin Harrison, Sanger served as his military aide and acted as his presidential secretary.

During the Spanish–American War and Philippine–American War, Sanger commanded several brigades and divisions, then supervised censuses in Puerto Rico, Cuba, and the Philippines. He was promoted to major general on January 20, 1904, and retired the following day. In retirement, Sanger resided in Washington, D.C. He died there on March 15, 1926, and was buried at Arlington National Cemetery.

== Early life and start of career ==
Joseph Prentice Sanger was born in Detroit, Michigan on May 4, 1840, a son of Henry Kirkland Sanger and Caroline (Prentice) Sanger. Sanger's parents were from New York originally, and came from old New England families. His cousins included George P. Sanger (Harvard, 1840), President of John Hancock Mutual Fund, his son Charles Robert Sanger, and William Cary Sanger (Harvard 1870), Assistant Secretary of War (1901–1903). He attended the schools of Detroit and was a student at the University of Michigan from 1858 to 1860. He enlisted in the Union Army in April 1861 and was appointed a first lieutenant in the 1st Michigan Infantry Regiment, a unit organized in response to President Abraham Lincoln's call at the start of the war for troops to serve three-month enlistments.

When the 1st Michigan mustered out in August 1861, Sanger joined the 1st Regiment of Artillery as commander of Battery D, and later commanded Battery E, 3rd Artillery. He served until the end of the war, and received promotion to captain and major by brevet in recognition of his heroism in the Bermuda Hundred campaign and the first and second battles of Deep Bottom, Virginia.

== Continued career ==
Sanger remained in the army after the Civil War, and was assigned as adjutant of the 1st Artillery in 1866. He was the honor graduate of his Artillery School course in 1869, and afterwards remained at Fort Monroe, Virginia to serve as the school's adjutant. When whiskey distillers in New York City refused to pay the federal tax on their product, a riot against federal authorities resulted. This civil disturbance became known as the Brooklyn Whiskey War of 1871, and Sanger commanded a battery in the army response that ended the riot.

From 1872 to 1875, Sanger was professor of military science at Bowdoin College, and he was promoted to captain in February 1875. From 1875 to 1877, he was an aide-de-camp to General Emory Upton during Upton's observation and inspection of armies in several Asian and European countries, including Japan and England. From 1877 to 1884, he commanded batteries of the 1st Artillery, including the regiment's Light Battery, which was posted to Fort Adams, Rhode Island.

From 1884 to 1888, Sanger was an aide-de-camp to Major General John Schofield during Schofield's command of the Military Division of the Atlantic. He was promoted to major in February 1891, and during the presidential administration of Benjamin Harrison, he served as Harrison's military aide and acting presidential secretary. In the mid-1890s, he served as military secretary for Schofield during Schofield's term as Commanding General of the United States Army. In September 1895, Sanger was detailed to the Inspector General's office, and he served first as inspector of the South Atlantic District, then as principal assistant to the army's Inspector General.

== Spanish–American War ==
In March 1898, Sanger was appointed inspector general of United States Volunteers and promoted to lieutenant colonel. In July 1898, he was promoted to brigadier general of volunteers, and in Cuba he successively commanded 2nd Brigade, 2nd Division, First Army Corps, 3rd Brigade, 2nd Division, First Corps, 3rd Division, First Corps, and 2nd Division, First Corps. In January 1899, Sanger was appointed commander of the District of Matanzas. He was discharged from the volunteers in June 1899, and performed staff duty in the office of the Assistant Secretary of War.

In August 1899, Sanger was appointed director of the U.S. census of Puerto Rico and Cuba, which was necessitated by the U.S. establishing governments there after defeating Spain. He was promoted to the permanent ranks of colonel in February 1901, and brigadier general in July 1902. From 1901 to 1903, he served in the Philippines during the Philippine–American War, holding simultaneously the positions of chief of staff and inspector general for Adna Chaffee, the military governor. From 1903 to 1904, Sanger was director of the U.S. census of the Philippines. On January 20, 1904, he was promoted to major general in accordance with a law permitting Union veterans still on active duty to be advanced one grade before retiring. He retired on January 21, two months before reaching the mandatory retirement age of 64.

== Retirement and death ==
In retirement, Sanger was a resident of Washington, D.C. He had authored articles for professional journals during his career, and after retirement, he was responsible for completing The Military Policy of the United States. This history of the army's doctrine and policy had been begun by Emory Upton, and it was edited for publication in 1904 by Sanger, William Dorrance Beach, and Charles Dudley Rhodes. He remained active in military and veterans' affairs, including serving on the Army of the Potomac committee that arranged the 1907 design and placement of Washington's Equestrian statue of George B. McClellan. In 1910, he was a member of the panel that investigated the Brownsville affair. In 1917, he was a member of the board chaired by Nelson A. Miles that reviewed awards of the Medal of Honor beginning with the Civil War and made recommendations on which had been awarded under questionable circumstances and should be revoked.

Sanger was a member of the Military Order of the Loyal Legion of the United States (MOLLUS) and Military Order of Foreign Wars. He also belonged to the General Society of Colonial Wars and Sons of the Revolution. He died at Walter Reed Army Medical Center on March 15, 1926. He was buried at Arlington National Cemetery.

== Family ==
In 1877, Sanger married Frances Kent (1850–1938) of Brooklyn, New York. They were the parents of two children, Edith Sanger (1879–1975) and Walter Prentice Sanger (1881–1964). Edith Sanger was the wife of prominent attorney James Mandeville Carlisle, a Yale & Harvard graduate. (1879–1922). Walter Prentice Sanger, known as Prentice, was a prominent New York City architect and landscape designer. Sanger's sister Frances Caroline Sanger (1848–1917) was the wife of Brigadier General John M. K. Davis.

== Legacy ==
In 1872, Sanger received the honorary degree of Master of Arts from Bowdoin College. Joseph P. Sanger Camp No. 15 (Lynn, Massachusetts) of the United Spanish War Veterans was named for Sanger.
