= 2nd Michigan Infantry Regiment =

- Michigan state flag
- Active: May 25, 1861, to August 1, 1865
- Country: United States
- Allegiance: Union
- Branch: Infantry
- Size: 1,725
- Engagements: First Battle of Bull Run; Peninsular Campaign; Second Battle of Bull Run; Battle of Fredericksburg; Siege of Vicksburg; Siege of Knoxville; Battle of the Wilderness; Battle of Cold Harbor; Siege of Petersburg

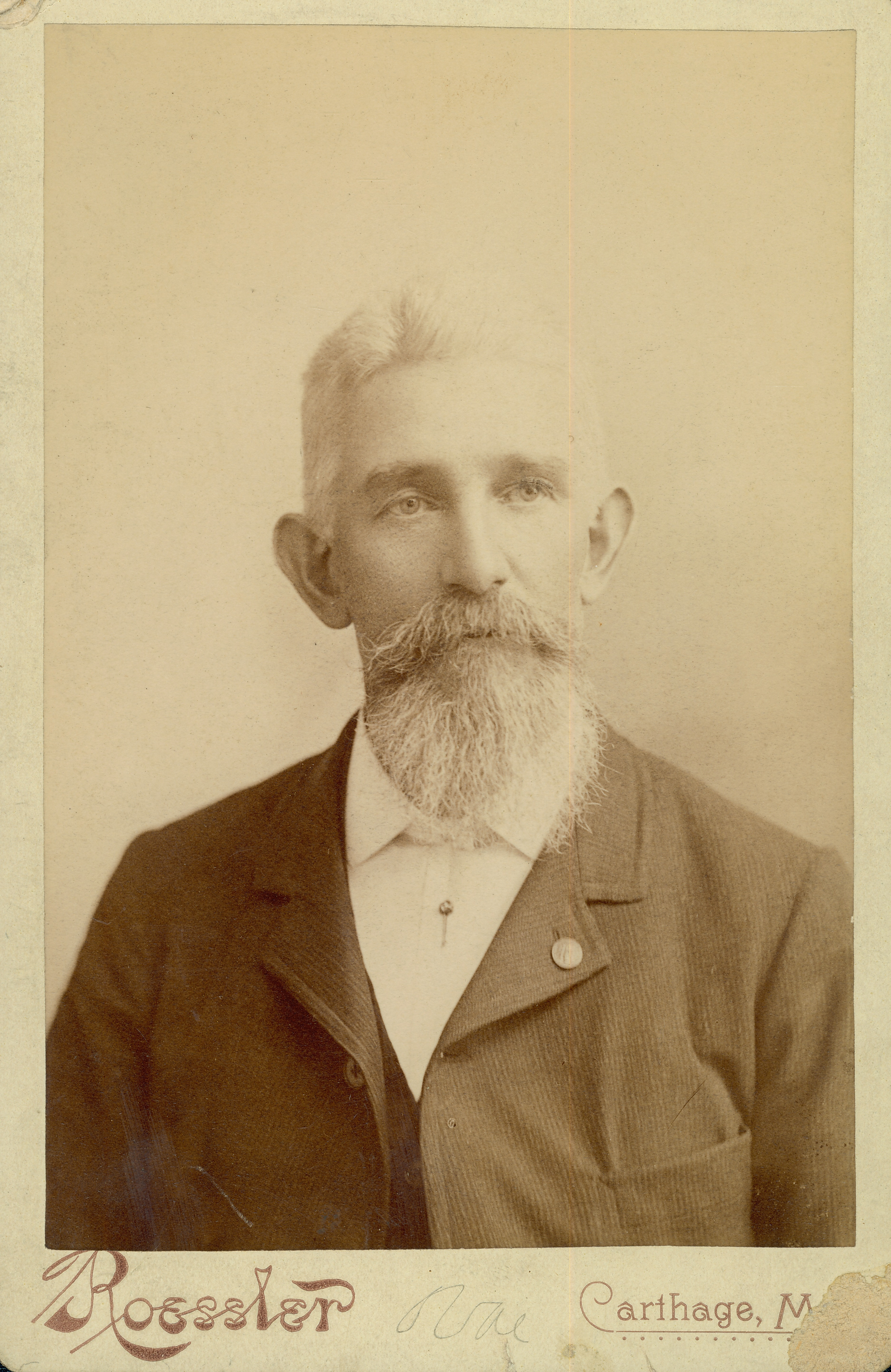
2nd Lieutenant William Leander Burlingame, 2nd Michigan Infantry

The 2nd Michigan Infantry Regiment was an infantry regiment that served in the Union Army during the American Civil War.

== Service ==
The 2nd Michigan Infantry was organized by Francis William Kellogg and others at Fort Wayne in Detroit, Michigan. It mustered into Federal service for a three-year enlistment on May 25, 1861. Another key early supporter and recruiter was future general Israel B. Richardson.

The regiment included Sarah Emma Edmonds (a.k.a. "Franklin Thompson") who had enlisted in Company F disguised as a man. Anna Etheridge served as the regimental vivandiere.

The regiment was mustered out on August 1, 1865, at Detroit.

== Total strength and casualties ==
The regiment suffered 11 officers and 214 enlisted men who were killed in action or mortally wounded and 4 officers and 143 enlisted men who died of disease, for a total of 372 fatalities.

== Commanders ==
- Colonel Orlando M. Poe
- Colonel William Humphrey

== See also ==
- List of Michigan Civil War Units
- Michigan in the American Civil War
- Sarah Emma Edmonds
