= Marie Tepe =

Vivandière in the Union Army (1834–1901)

Mary Tepe
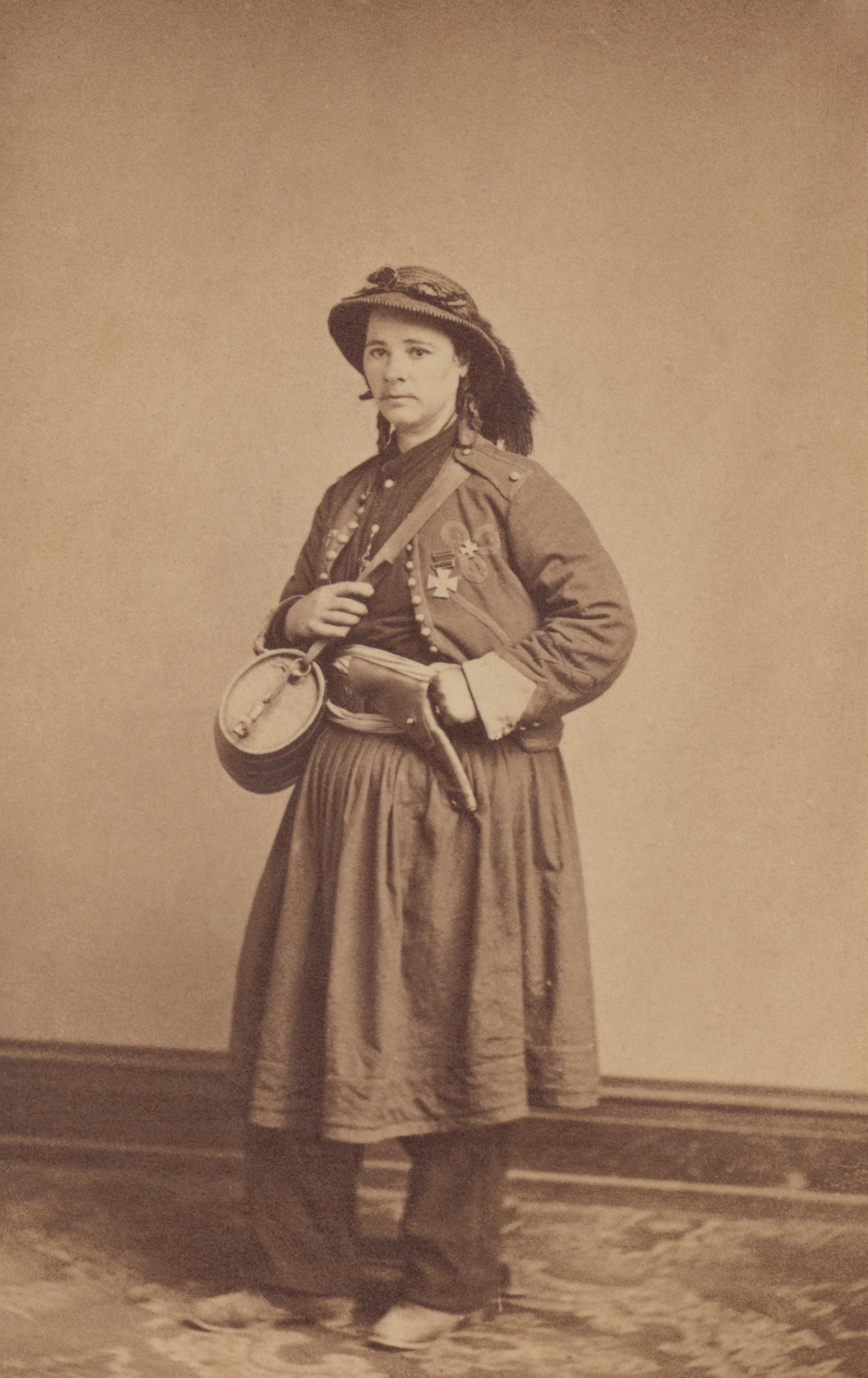
- Tepe c. 1863
- Born: Marie Brose; August 24, 1834; Brest, France
- Died: May 24, 1901 (aged 66); Pittsburgh, Pennsylvania, United States
- Occupation: Vivandière

Marie Brose Tepe Leonard (August 24, 1834 – May 24, 1901), known as "French Mary," was a vivandière of Franco-Turkish descent who fought for the Union Army during the American Civil War. Tepe served with the 27th and 114th Pennsylvania Infantry Regiments.

== Early life ==
Little is known of Tepe's early life. Born Marie Brose, Tepe was born in Brest, France, on August 24, 1834. Her father was Turkish and her mother was French. It is unknown when she immigrated to the United States, but it is estimated that she immigrated at fifteen years old. Around 1854 she married a tailor from Philadelphia named Bernhard Tepe.

== Civil War service ==
Tepe's husband enlisted in the 27th Pennsylvania Infantry as a private. He wanted Tepe to stay behind and run their tailor shop during his service, but Tepe enlisted herself. She enlisted in the 27th as well. While the unit marched to Philadelphia, Tepe was responsible for carrying a 1.5 gallon keg for whiskey or water. While at camp, Tepe sold various goods to the soldiers until the First Battle of Bull Run, when she worked in the regimental hospital. Tepe's time with the 27th Infantry ended when her husband and his friends, while intoxicated, stole $1,600 from Tepe.

The opportunity to be a vivandière called Tepe back into the service. She joined Charles H.T. Collis and his regiment of Zouaves d’Afrique, the 114th Pennsylvania. In this regiment, she received a soldier's pay with an additional twenty-five cents for each day spent working at the hospital. She became the "daughter of the regiment." She worked alongside the 114th Pennsylvania as a sutler as well as cooking, and washing and mending clothing. After a particularly deadly Battle of Chancellorsville, Tepe began working with a field hospital. Tepe and Annie Etheridge were awarded the Kearny Cross on May 16, 1863, after their work in the Battle of Chancellorsville, though Tepe refused the award. They were the only women awarded out of 300 medal recipients.

Tepe joined the 114th on numerous campaigns, and was for the most part spared of injury. She was reported to be wounded in the ankle during the Battle of Fredericksburg but otherwise had good luck. By one account, Tepe came under fire a total of thirteen times. At the Battle of Chancellorsville, Tepe endured particularly hazardous conditions to bring water to exhausted troops. Tepe's regiment was present at the First Battle of Bull Run, Fair Oaks, Fredericksburg, Chancellorsville, Gettysburg, and Spotsylvania.

== Post-war life ==
After the war, she married a Civil War veteran named Richard Leonard; her previous husband had died at Gettysburg. The death of Bernard is in dispute as military records report that he survived the war and mustered out with his company in Philadelphia, Pennsylvania, in 1864. Certain records report that the two met during the Petersburg Campaign and married in Culpeper, Virginia. She and Leonard divorced in March 1897, with Tepe citing "general abuse" as the cause of the split.

Tepe was awarded the Kearny Cross for her courageous service at Chancellorsville. In 1898, a newspaper reported that Tepe attempted to receive pension for her military service, yet no records indicate that she received this pension. As a result, she became destitute later in life, developing rheumatism and still suffering from her ankle injury incurred during the war.

She committed suicide May 24, 1901 by drinking a lethal dose of "Paris Green," a kind of paint pigment.
