= Anna Hanson Dorsey =

American novelist and short story writer

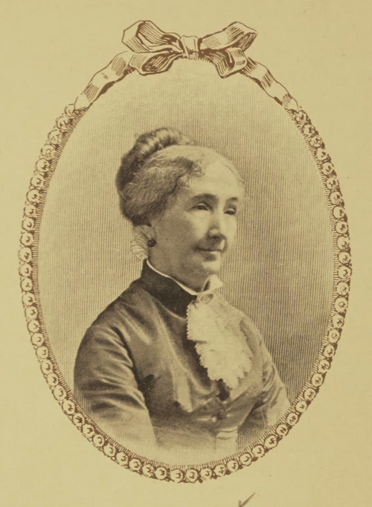
- Born: December 12, 1815; Georgetown, District of Columbia, United States
- Died: December 25, 1896 (aged 81); Washington, D.C., United States
- Occupations: Novelist, short story writer
- Spouse: Lorenzo Dorsey
- Children: Ella Loraine Dorsey
- Relatives: Rev. William McKenney (father)
- Writing career
- Genres: Catholic novels and short stories
- Notable awards: Laetare Medal

Anna Hanson Dorsey (/ˈdɔːrsi/ DOR-see; 12 December 1815 – 25 December 1896) was an American novelist known for her contributions to Catholic literature in the 19th century. Born in Georgetown, Washington, D.C., she was raised Protestant but later converted to Catholicism, which influenced much of her writing. Dorsey authored more than 40 novels that explored themes of faith, religious conversion, and Southern Catholic life. Her works received recognition from prominent Catholic figures, including commendations from two popes, and she was awarded the Laetare Medal by the University of Notre Dame. Dorsey's novels have continued to be appreciated for their storytelling and portrayal of American Catholic culture.

== Life ==
Anna Hanson Dorsey was born Anna McKenney in December 1815, in Georgetown, Washington, D.C. She was the daughter of Rev. William McKenney, a Protestant clergyman and chaplain in the United States Navy, and Chloe Ann Lanigan McKenney. Dorsey's great-grandfather, was Lieutenant Colonel Samuel Hanson of Green Hill.

Dorsey was raised in a Protestant family, and she converted to Catholicism during her youth.

In 1837, at the age of twenty-four, she married Lorenzo Dorsey of Baltimore, son of Judge Owen Dorsey. Shortly after their marriage, the couple converted to the Catholic faith.

Their son was mortally wounded while serving for the Union during the American Civil War, reportedly while planting the American flag on the ramparts of Fort Hill. She had three daughters, one of them, Ella Loraine Dorsey, later became a recognized author. The eldest daughter, Clara H. Muhun, was a prominent figure and one of the earliest members in the Literary Society of Washington.

Despite her Southern roots, Dorsey and her family were strong advocates for emancipation and opposed secession during the Civil War.

== Writing career ==
Following her conversion to Catholicism, Dorsey dedicated herself to writing Catholic literature, primarily focusing on stories and novels, though she also composed some poetry. Her body of work includes poetry, novels, and drama, with notable titles such as May Brooke (1856), The Oriental Pearl (1857), Warp and Woof (1887), and Palms (1887).

She worked alongside contemporaries such as Mrs. Sadlier, Dr. Charles Constantine Pise, Charles James Cannon, John D. Bryant, and Dr. J. V. Huntington in promoting Catholic-themed works.

Patrick Donahoe, the founder of The Pilot, was among the first Catholic publishers to recognize her talent, compensating her for her contributions. Many of her early serialized stories appeared in The Pilot, while her later works were frequently featured in Ave Maria. One of her final stories, "Sadie’s Knight," was serialized shortly before her death.

Dorsey's body of work includes notable titles such as Woodreve Manor, Tangled Paths, The Old Gray Rosary, Palms, Ada’s Trust, Adrift, Beth’s Promise, The Heiress of Carrigona, The Old House at Glouster, A Brave Girl, Fate of the Dane, Warp and Woof, and The Student of Blenheim Forest. Her first major success, Woodreve Manor, explored the life within a Catholic Indian mission. This novel was dramatized twice and translated into multiple languages, including Hindi.

Her novels often depicted the older, affluent, and more leisurely lifestyle of Southern Catholics, contrasting with Mary Anne Sadlier’s focus on the struggles of Irish immigrants in Northern states. Dorsey’s writing was characterized by vivid storytelling and strong character development. Beyond their romantic appeal, her works serve as realistic portraits of a past era in American life.

According to The National Quarterly Review, she was welcomed and contributed to periodicals such as The True Woman.

== Death and legacy ==
By 1893, Dorsey had become an invalid and was living with her children in Washington, D.C.

Anna Hanson Dorsey died on Christmas Day at her home in Washington, surrounded by her daughters and receiving the Sacraments of the Church. According to The Pilot, her novels have continued to resonate with readers, influencing generations of Catholic literature.

== Awards and recognition ==
Throughout her career, Dorsey received several accolades, including letters of commendation from Popes Pius IX and Leo XIII. In 1850, the University of Notre Dame awarded her the prestigious Laetare Medal in recognition of her contributions to Catholic literature, also in education and religion.

The Catholic University of America Press recognizes Dorsey as one of the nearly forgotten, yet significant, women Catholic writers.

Dorsey is featured in the biographical compilation A Woman of the Century, which includes prominent American women across various fields. Edited by Frances E. Willard and Mary A. Livermore, the volume was published by Charles Wells Moulton in 1893.

== Selected works ==
- The Student of Blenheim Forest (1847)
- Flowers of Love of Memory (1849)
- Oriental Pearl; or, the Catholic Immigrants (1850)
- Tears of the Diadem or, the Crown and the Cloister (1850)
- The Sister of Charity (1850)
- Woodreve Manor (1853)
- Conscience, or the Trials of May Brooke (1856)
- Coaina: The Rose of the Algonquins (1867)
- Nora Brady's Vow (1869)
- Tangled Paths (1885)
- Adrift (1887)
- The Heiress of Carrigmona (1887)
- The Old House at Glenaran (1887)
- Palms (1887)
- The Fate of the Dane and Other Stories (1888)
- Zoe's Daughter (1888)
- Ada's Trust
- Beth's Promise
- Mona, the Vestal
- The Flemings
- The Old Gray Rosary
- The Student of Blenheim Forest
- Warp and Woof
