= Charlotte Elizabeth McKay =

American editor, Union Army nurse and anti-suffragist

- Born: Charlotte Elizabeth Johnson; August 2, 1818; Waterford, Maine, U.S.
- Died: April 10, 1894 (aged 75); San Diego, California, U.S.
- Occupations: Editor, nurse, anti-suffragist
- Known for: Union Army nurse during American Civil War, anti-suffrage activism
- Notable work: The True Woman (periodical)
- Spouse: William P. McKay (m. 1854–1856)
- Children: Julia (deceased)
- Parent: Dr. Abner Johnson (father)
- Relatives: 6 siblings
- Awards: Kearny Cross from 17th Maine Volunteer Infantry Regiment

Charlotte Elizabeth McKay (née Johnson; August 2, 1818 – April 10, 1894) was an American editor, Union Army nurse, and an anti-suffragist. She worked as a field nurse during the American Civil War, receiving a Kearny Cross from the 17th Maine Volunteer Infantry Regiment, whom she had cared for after the Battle of Chancellorsville. She was the first woman who protested against the suffrage movement, and she was the editor of the first American anti-suffrage periodical, The True Woman.

== Early years ==
Charlotte Elizabeth Johnson was born in Waterford, Maine, on August 2, 1818. Her father was Dr. Abner Johnson, inventor of Johnson's Anodyne Liniment, and there were six siblings. In 1854, she married William P. McKay (died April 10, 1856), and their only child, Julia, died May 1861, in South Reading.

== Career ==
McKay accepted an appointment under Dorothea Dix as a hospital nurse, and commenced her hospital life in Frederick, Maryland, in March 1862, where she was entrusted with the care of a large number of wounded from the First Battle of Winchester. In September 1862, the city was filled for two or three days with Stonewall Jackson's Corps on their way to South Mountain and Antietam. The rebels took possession of the hospital, and filled it for the time with their sick and wounded men. Resistance was useless, and McKay treated the rebel officers and men courteously, and did what she could for the sick; her civility and kindness were recognized, and she was treated respectfully. After the Battle of Antietam, Frederick City and its hospitals were filled with the wounded, but as soon as the wounded became convalescent, she went to Washington, D.C., and was assigned to duty for a time in the hospitals of the Capital. In January, she went to Falmouth, Virginia, and found employment as a nurse in the Third Corps Hospital. Here, she soon effected an evolution in the hospital; from being the worst, it became the best of the corps hospitals at the front. General David B. Birney and his wife, seconded and encouraged all her efforts for its improvement.

The battles known as Battle of Chancellorsville were full of horrors for McKay. She witnessed the assault on Marye's Heights, and while ministering to the wounded, she received the news that her brother, who was with Joseph Hooker at Chancellorsville, had been killed in the protracted fighting there. Six weeks later, she was in Washington, awaiting the battle between Robert E. Lee's forces and Hooker's, afterwards commanded by General George Meade. When the intelligence of the Battle of Gettysburg came, she went to Baltimore, and then to Gettysburg, reaching the hospital of her division, five miles from Gettysburg, on 7 July 1863. Here, she remained for nearly two months, caring for 1,000 to 1,500 wounded men. In the autumn, she again sought the hospital of the Third Division, Third Corps, at the front, which for the time was at Warrenton, Virginia. After the Battle of Mine Run, she cared for the wounded; and later in the season, she had charge of one of the hospitals at Brandy Station. Like the other women who were connected with hospitals at this place, she was compelled to retire by the order of April 15; but like them, she returned to her work early in May, at Belle Plains, Fredericksburg, White House, and City Point. The changes in the army organization in June 1864 removed most of her friends in the old third corps, and McKay, on the invitation of the surgeon in charge of the Cavalry Corps hospital, took charge of the special diet of that hospital, where she remained for nearly a year, finally leaving the service in March, 1865, and remaining in Virginia in the care and instruction of the Freedmen till late in the spring of 1866. The officers and men who had been under her care in the Cavalry Corps Hospital, presented her on Christmas Day, 1864, with an elegant gold badge and chain, with a suitable inscription, as a testimonial of their gratitude for her services. She had previously received from the officers of the 17th Maine Volunteer Infantry Regiment, whom she had cared for after the battle of Chancellorsville, a Kearny Cross, with its motto and an inscription indicating by whom it was presented. She did not receive a military pension and had generally not been paid for the nursing work that she did.

On 10 February 1870, a hearing was granted by the senate committee of the District of Columbia, to a delegation of ladies, one of whom, McKay, of Massachusetts, read a paper remonstrating against the extension of suffrage to the women of the US. This paper was afterwards presented as a memorial in the senate, referred to the committee on the judiciary, and ordered to be printed as a congressional document. It was afterwards, as a tract, extensively circulated throughout the country. McKay may, therefore, be recorded as the first woman who protested against the suffrage movement. She became the editor of the first American anti-suffrage periodical, The True Woman in the following year, published out of Baltimore, Maryland.

== Later years ==
She wrote her memoirs in Wakefield, Massachusetts, and published them in 1876. She moved to San Diego, California in the 1890s where she died in 1894.

== Selected works ==
- 1870, Memorial of C.E. McKay remonstrating against the right of suffrage being granted to women
- 1876, Stories of hospital and camp

== Bibliography ==
- Brockett, Linus Pierpont; Vaughan, Mary C. (1867). Woman's Work in the Civil War: A Record of Heroism, Patriotism and Patience. Zeigler, McCurdy & Company. p. 514.
- Frank, Lisa Tendrich (2008). Women in the American Civil War. ABC-CLIO. ISBN 978-1-85109-600-8.
- Hudson, Frederic (1873). Journalism in the United States, from 1690 to 1872 (Public domain ed.). Ardent Media. GGKEY:QERDU6AXBPY.
- Marshall, Susan E. (1 July 1997). Splintered Sisterhood: Gender and Class in the Campaign against Woman Suffrage. University of Wisconsin Press. ISBN 978-0-299-15463-9.
- Sears, Edward I. (1874). The National Quarterly Review (Public domain ed.). Pudney & Russell.
- Tucker, Spencer C. (30 September 2013). American Civil War: The Definitive Encyclopedia and Document Collection [6 volumes]. ABC-CLIO. ISBN 978-1-85109-682-4.

Attribution
