= American Civil War corps badges =

Corps badges in the American Civil War

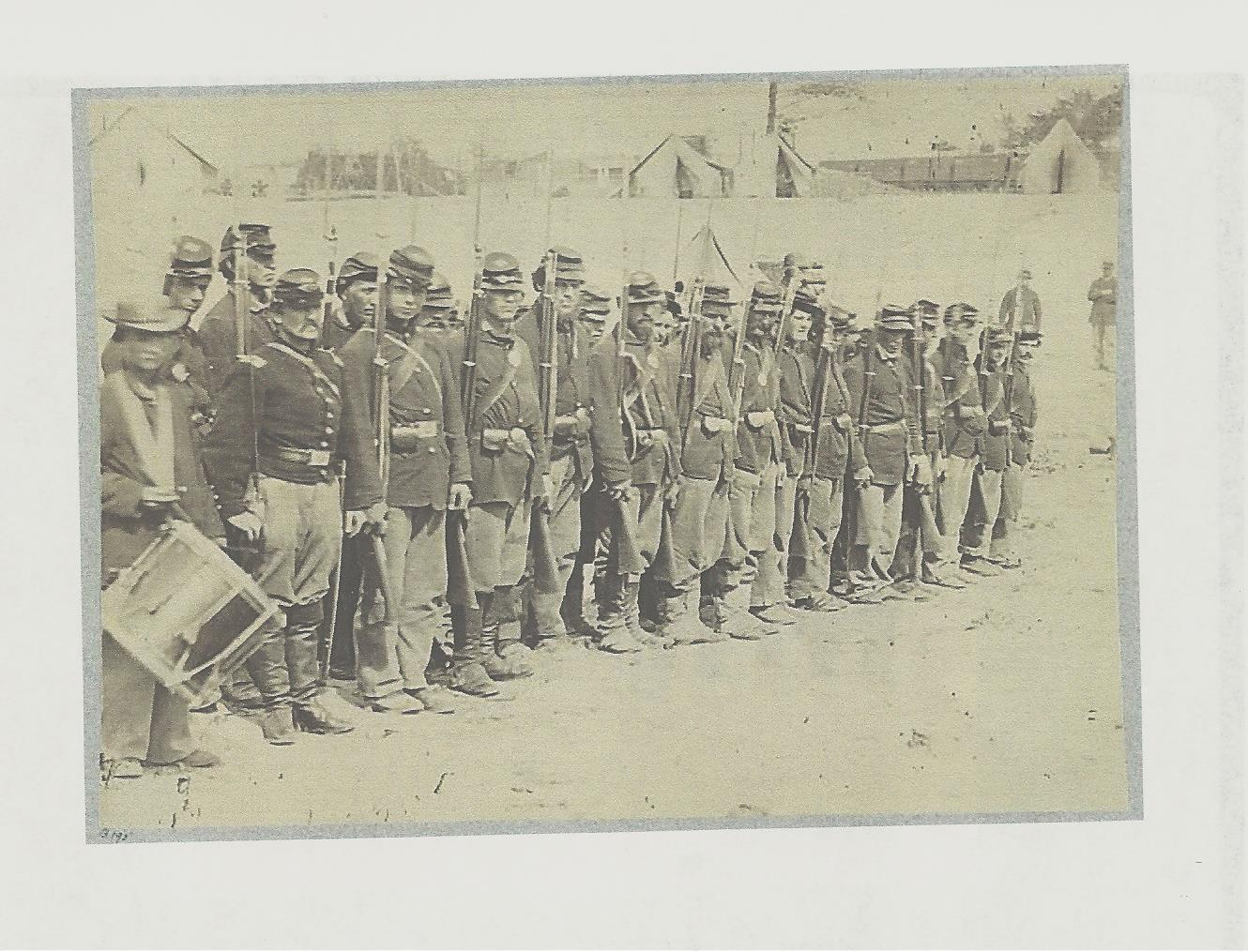
Co C 110th Pennsylvania Infantry after the Battle of Fredericksburg Va. An excellent photograph showing the Union Army white Diamond shaped III Corps Badges on the forage caps

Corps badges in the American Civil War were originally worn by soldiers of the Union Army on the top of their army forage cap (kepi), left side of the hat, or over their left breast. The idea is attributed to Maj. Gen. Philip Kearny, who ordered the men in his division to sew a two-inch square of red cloth on their hats to avoid confusion on the battlefield. This idea was adopted by Maj. Gen. Joseph Hooker after he assumed command of the Army of the Potomac, so any soldier could be identified at a distance.

Maj. Gen. Daniel Butterfield, Hooker's chief of staff, was assigned the task of designing a distinctive shape for each corps badge. Butterfield also designated that each division in the corps should have a variation of the corps badge in a different color. Division badges were colored as follows:

1. Red — First division of corps
2. White — Second division of corps
3. Blue — Third division of corps

These were used in the United States' Army of the Potomac. For the most part, these rules were adopted by other Union Armies; however, it was not universal. For example, the XIII Corps never adopted a badge, and the XIX Corps had the first division wear a red badge, the second division wear a blue badge, and the third division wear white.

For Army corps that had more than three divisions, the standardization was lost:

1. Green — Fourth division of II, III, VI, IX, and XX Corps
2. Yellow — Fourth division of XV Corps (reportedly Orange was also used for a 5th Division Badge)
3. Multicolor — Headquarters or artillery elements (certain corps)

The badges for enlisted men were cut from colored cloth, while officer's badges were privately made and of a higher quality. Metallic badges were often made by jewelers and were personalized for the user. The badges eventually became part of the Army regulations and a great source of regimental pride.

== Corps badges ==
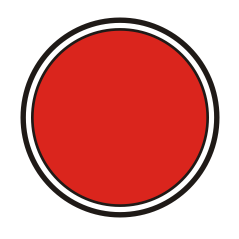
Union Army, I Corps, 1st Division Badge,

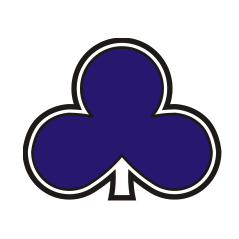
Union Army, II Corps, 3rd Division Badge

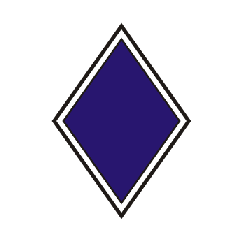
Union Army, III Corps, 3rd Division Badge

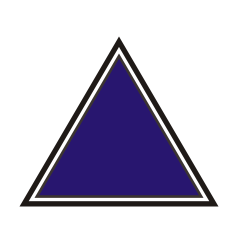
Union Army, IV Corps, 3rd Division Badge

Union Army, V Corps, 1st Division Badge

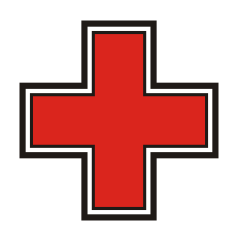
Union Army, VI Corps, 1st Division Badge

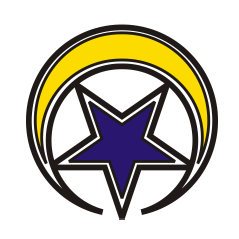
Union Army, VII Corps, 3rd Division Badge

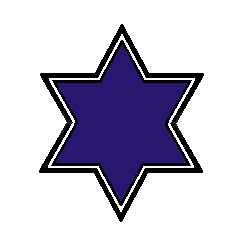
Union Army, VIII Corps, 3rd Division Badge

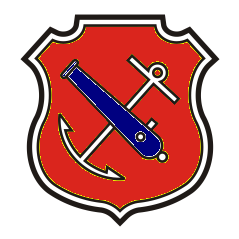
Union Army, IX Corps, 1st Division Badge

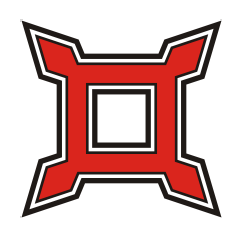
Union Army, X Corps, 1st Division Badge

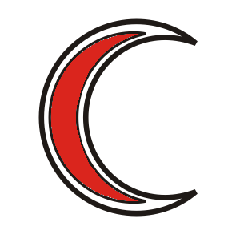
Union Army, XI Corps, 1st Division Badge

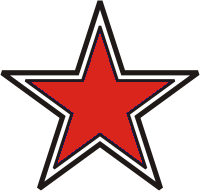
Union Army, XII Corps, 1st Division Badge

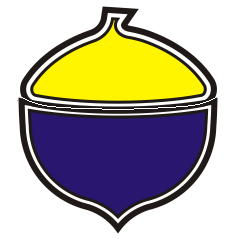
Union Army, XIV Corps, 3rd Division Badge

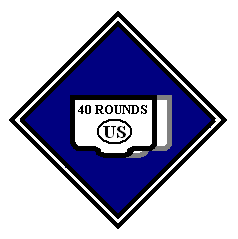
Union Army, XV Corps, 3rd Division Badge

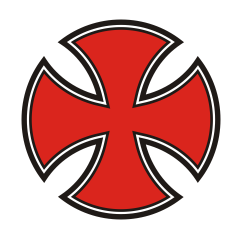
Union Army, XVI Corps, 1st Division Badge

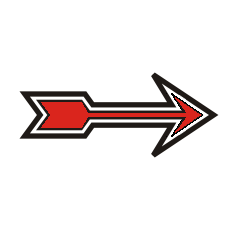
Union Army, XVII Corps, 1st Division Badge

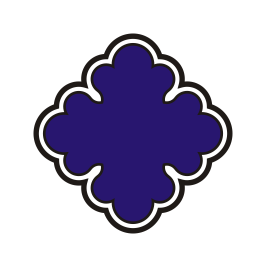
Union Army, XVIII Corps, 3rd Division Badge

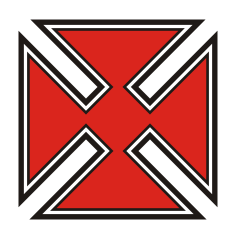
Union Army, XIX Corps, 1st Division Badge

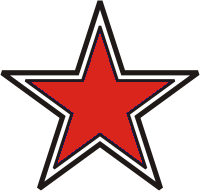
Union Army, XX Corps, 1st Division Badge

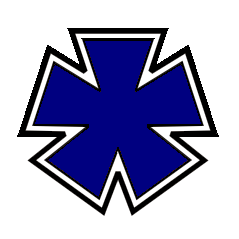
Union Army, XXII Corps, 3rd Division Badge

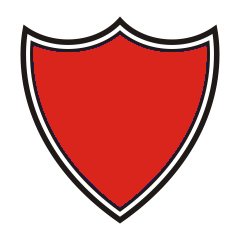
Union Army, XXIII Corps, 3rd Division Badge

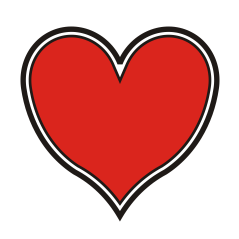
Union Army, XXIV Corps, 1st Division Badge

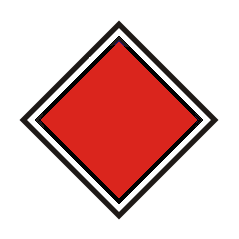
Union Army, XXV Corps, 1st Division Badge

== Corps flags ==
=== I Corps, Army of the Potomac ===
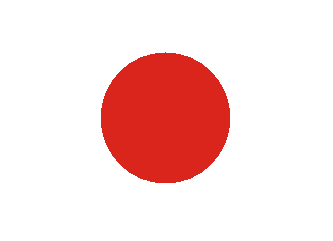
Union Army 1st Division Flag, I Corps

1st Division

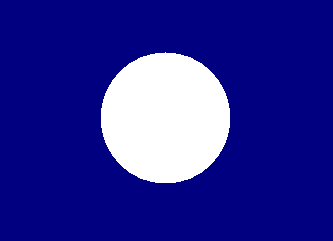
Union Army 2nd Division Flag, I Corps

2nd Division

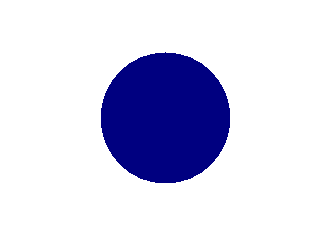
Union Army 3rd Division Flag, I Corps

3rd Division

=== II Corps, Army of the Potomac ===
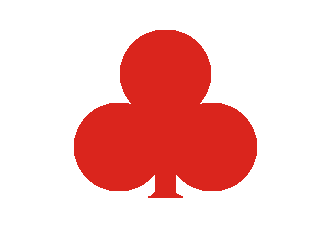
Union Army 1st Division Flag, II Corps, Army of the Potomac

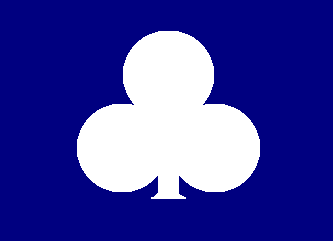
Union Army 2nd Division Flag, II Corps, Army of the Potomac

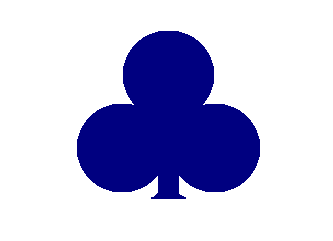
Union Army 3rd Division Flag, II Corps, Army of the Potomac

1st Division
2nd Division
3rd Division

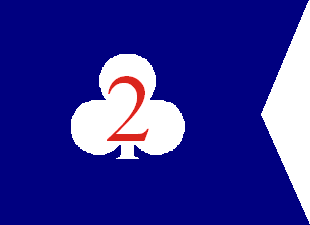
Union Army Corps Hqr's, II Corps, Army of the Potomac

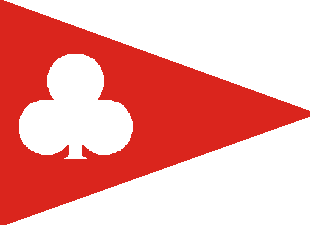
Union Army Artillery Brigade, II Corps, Army of the Potomac

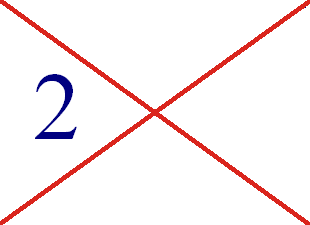
Union Army Quartermaster Badge, II Corps, Army of the Potomac

Corps Hqr's
Artillery Brigade
Quartermaster

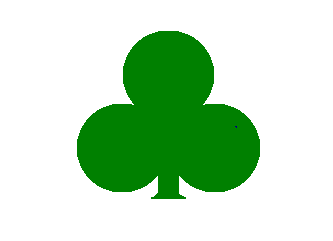
Union Army 4th Division Badge, II Corps

4th Division (rarely used)

=== III Corps, Army of the Potomac ===
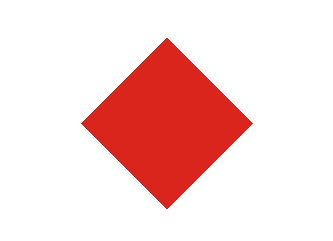
Union Army 1st Division Flag, III Corps

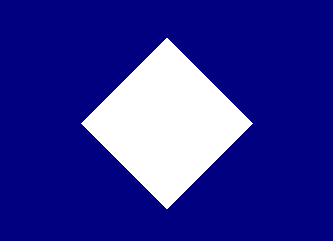
Union Army 2nd Division Flag, III Corps

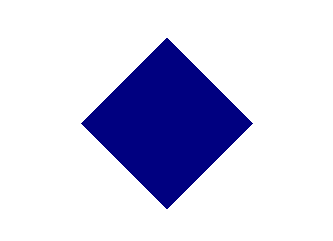
Union Army 3rd Division Flag, III Corps

1st Division
2nd Division
3rd Division

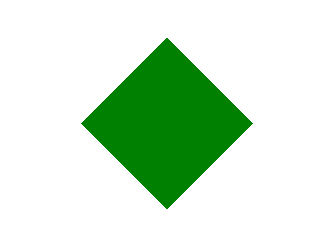
Union Army 4th Division Badge, III Corps

4th Division (rarely used)

=== IV Corps, Army of the Cumberland ===
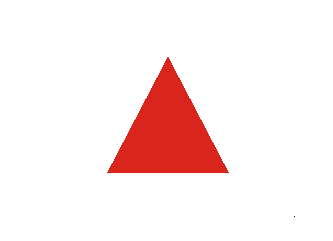
Union Army 1st Division Flag, IV Corps

1st Division

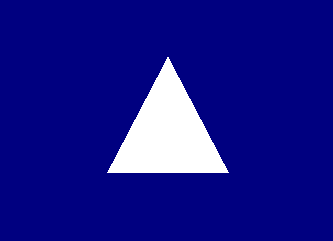
Union Army 2nd Division Flag, IV Corps

2nd Division

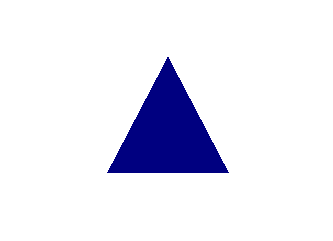
Union Army 3rd Division Flag, IV Corps

3rd Division

=== V Corps, Army of the Potomac ===
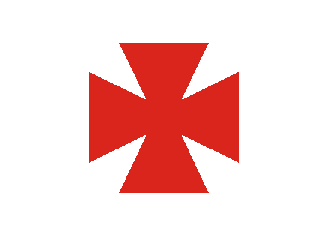
Union Army 1st Division Flag, V Corps

1st Division

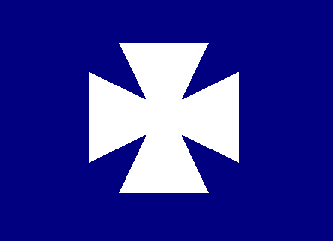
Union Army 2nd Division Flag, V Corps

2nd Division

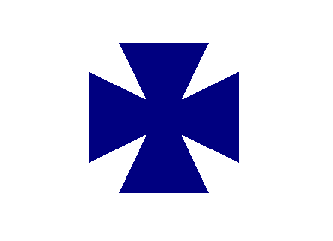
Union Army 3rd Division Flag, V Corps

3rd Division

=== VI Corps, Army of the Potomac ===
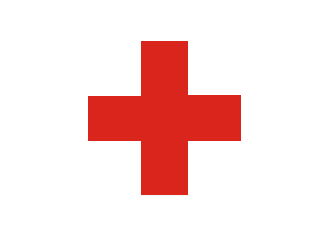
Union Army 1st Division Flag, VI Corps

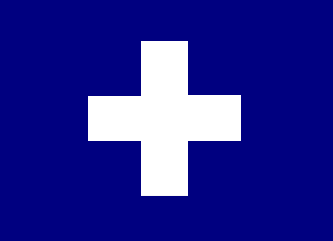
Union Army 2nd Division Flag, VI Corps

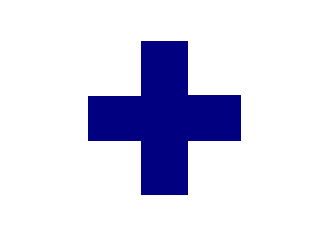
Union Army 3rd Division Flag, VI Corps

1st Division
2nd Division
3rd Division

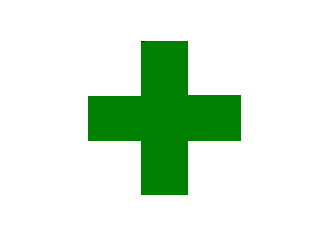
Union Army 4th Division Badge, VI Corps

4th Division

=== VII Corps, Dept of Arkansas ===
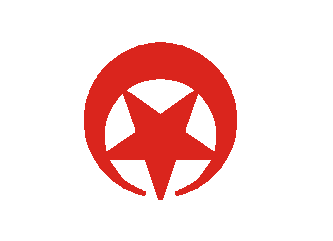
Union Army 1st Division Badge, VII Corps

1st Division

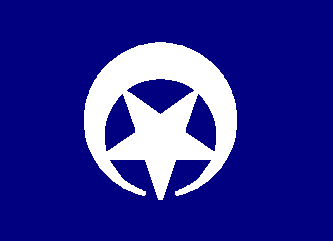
Union Army 2nd Division Badge, VII Corps

2nd Division

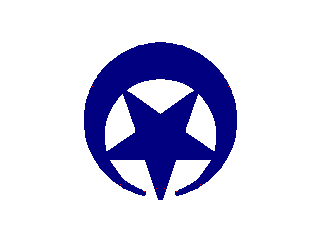
Union Army 3rd Division Badge, VII Corps

3rd Division

=== VIII Corps, Middle Department ===
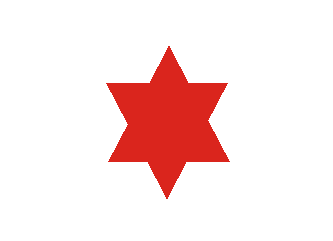
Union Army 1st Division Badge, VIII Corps

1st Division

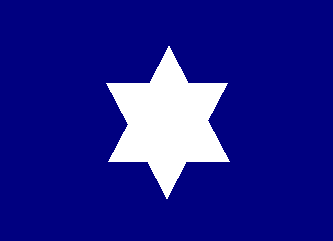
Union Army 2nd Division Badge, VIII Corps

2nd Division

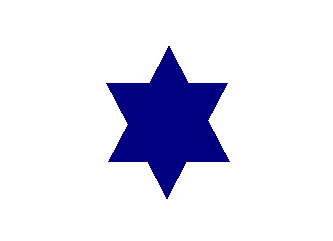
Union Army 3rd Division Badge, VIII Corps

3rd Division

=== IX Corps, Army of the Potomac ===
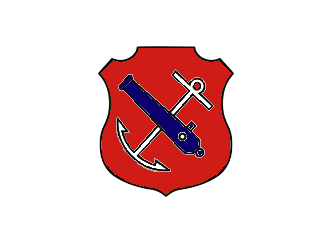
Union Army 1st Division Badge, IX Corps

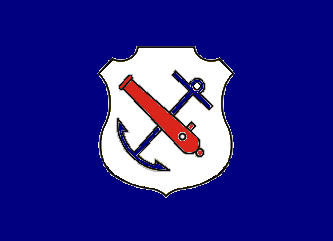
Union Army 2nd Division Badge, IX Corps

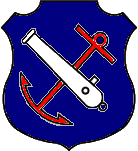
Union Army 3rd Division Badge, IX Corps

1st Division
2nd Division
3rd Division

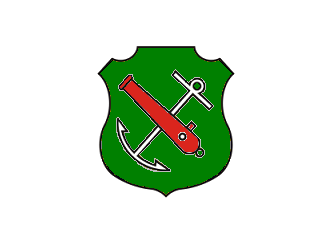
Union Army 4th Division Badge, IX Corps

4th Division

=== X Corps, Department of South ===
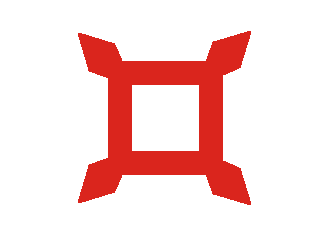
Union Army 1st Division Badge, X Corps

1st Division

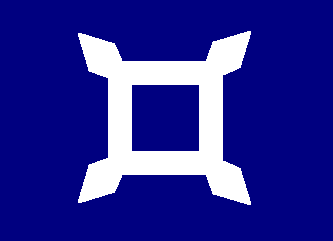
Union Army 2nd Division Badge, X Corps

2nd Division

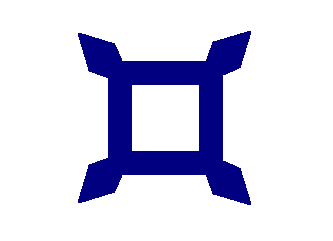
Union Army 3rd Division Badge, X Corps

3rd Division

=== XI Corps, Army of the Potomac ===
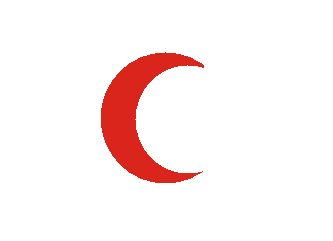
Union Army 1st Division Badge, XI Corps

1st Division

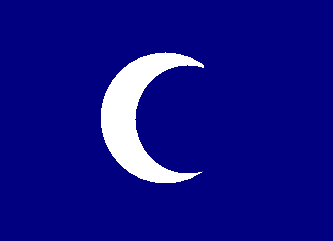
Union Army 2nd Division Badge, XI Corps

2nd Division

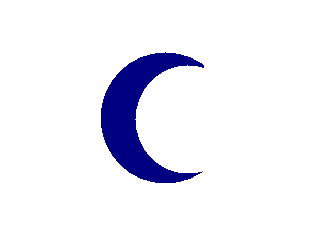
Union Army 3rd Division Badge, XI Corps

3rd Division

=== XII Corps, Army of the Potomac ===
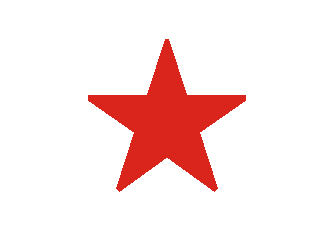
Union Army 1st Division Badge, XII Corps

1st Division

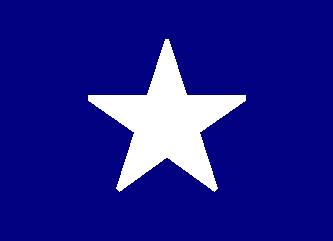
Union Army 2nd Division Badge, XII Corps

2nd Division

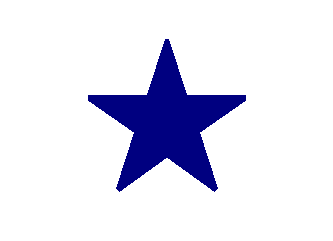
Union Army 3rd Division Badge, XII Corps

3rd Division

=== XIII Corps, Army of the Tennessee ===
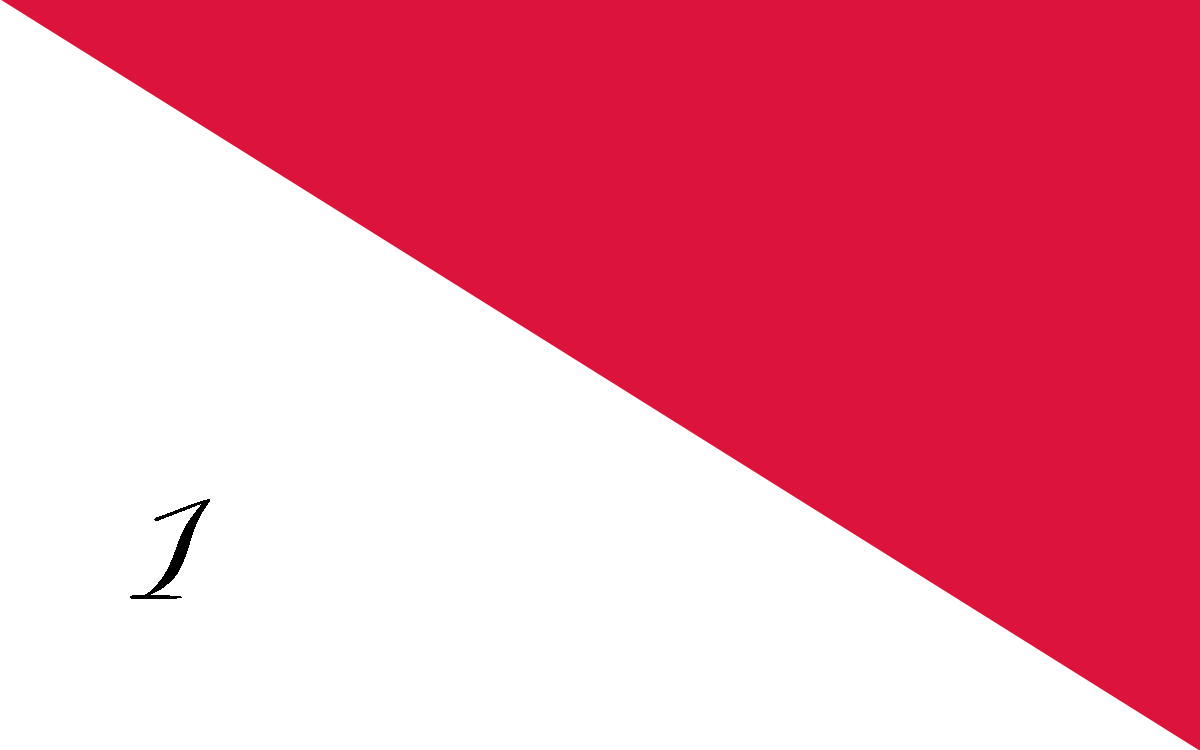
Union Army 1st Division Flag, XIII Corps

1st Division

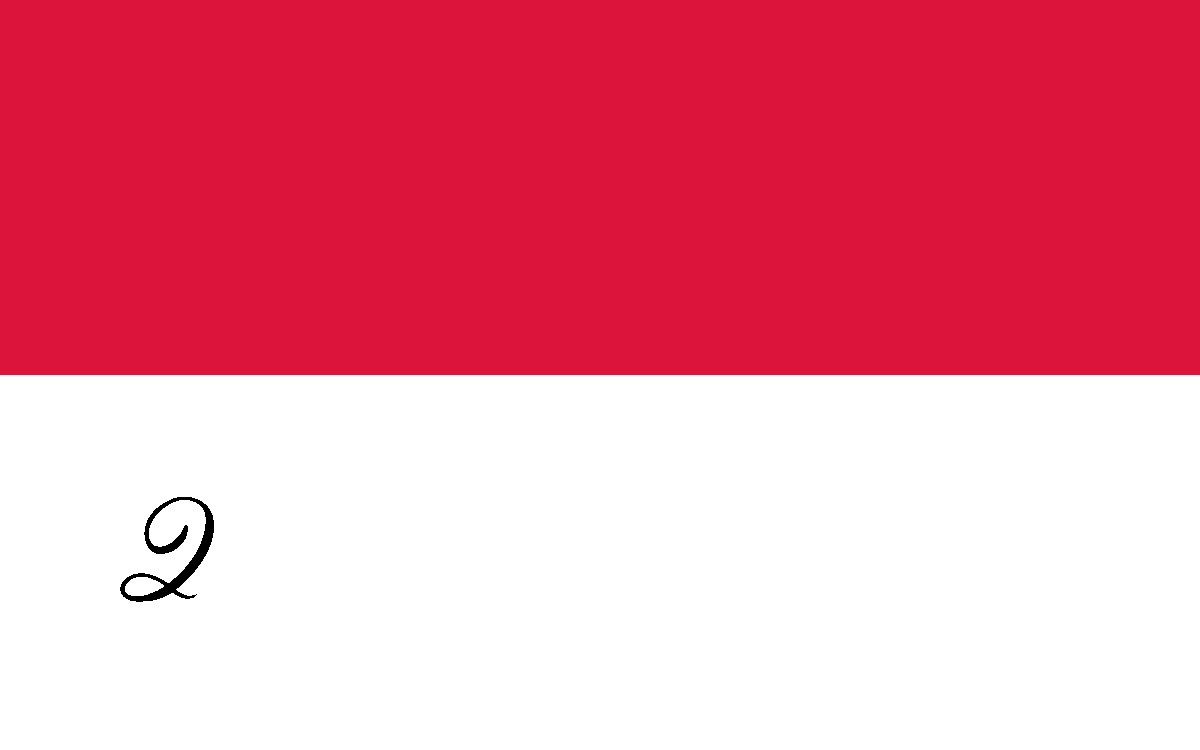
Union Army 2nd Division Flag, XIII Corps

2nd Division

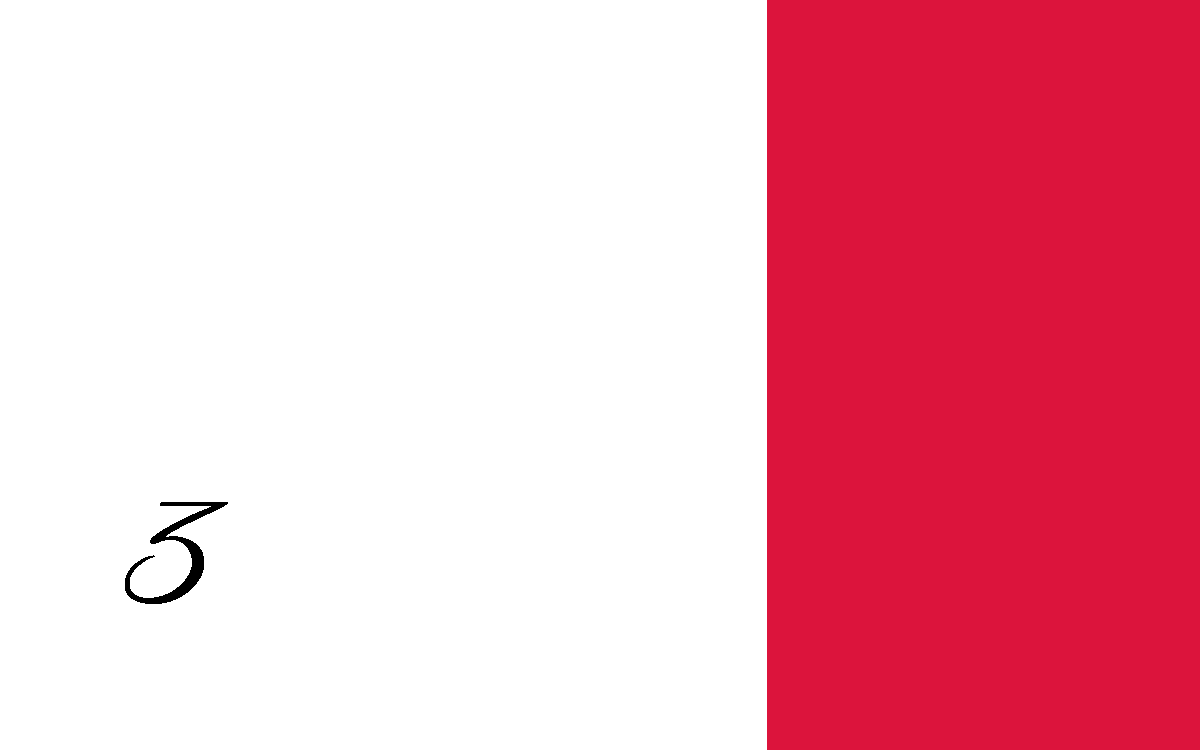
Union Army 3rd Division Flag, XIII Corps

3rd Division

=== XIV Corps, Army of the Cumberland ===
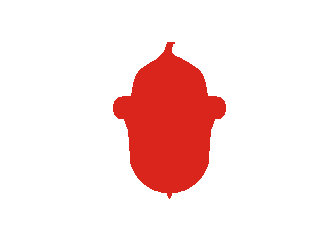
Union Army 1st Division Badge, XIV Corps

1st Division

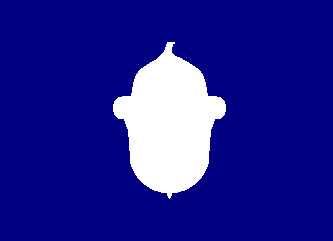
Union Army 2nd Division Badge, XIV Corps

2nd Division

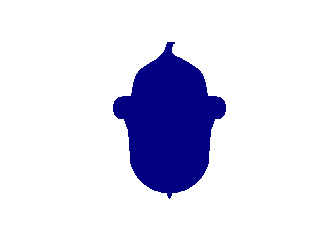
Union Army 3rd Division Badge, XIV Corps

3rd Division

=== XV Corps, Army of the Tennessee ===
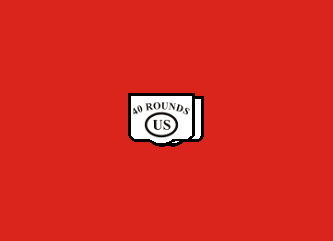
Union Army 1st Division Badge, XV Corps

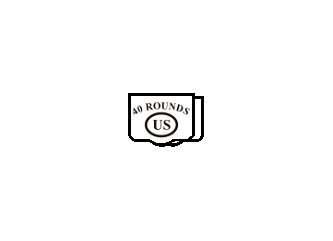
Union Army 2nd Division Badge, XV Corps

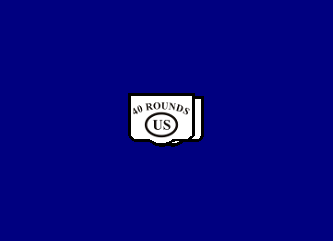
Union Army 3rd Division Badge, XV Corps

1st Division
2nd Division
3rd Division

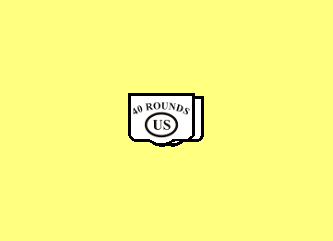
Union Army 4th Division Badge, XV Corps

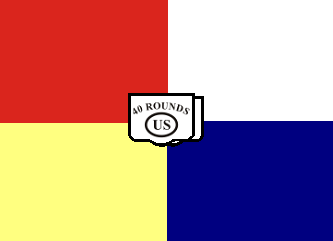
Union Army Headquarters Badge, XV Corps

4th Division
Headquarters

=== XVI Corps, Military Division of West Mississippi ===
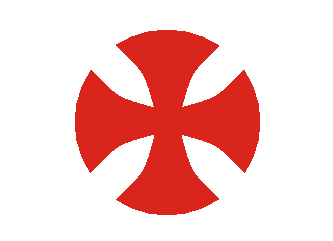
Union Army 1st Division Badge, XVI Corps

1st Division

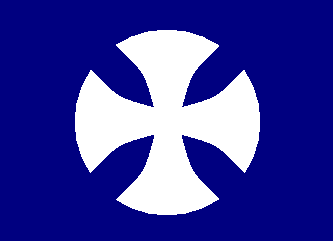
Union Army 2nd Division Badge, XVI Corps

2nd Division

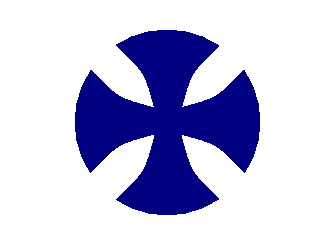
Union Army 3rd Division Badge, XVI Corps

3rd Division

=== XVII Corps, Army of the Tennessee ===
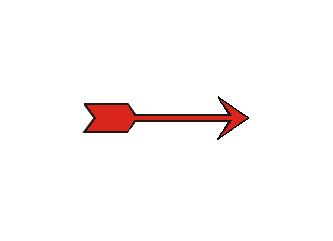
Union Army 1st Division Badge, XVII Corps

1st Division

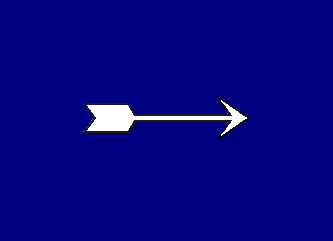
Union Army 2nd Division Badge, XVII Corps

2nd Division

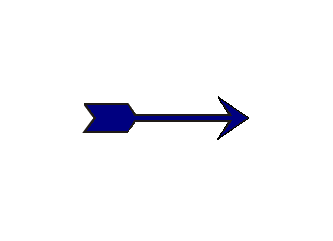
Union Army 3rd Division Badge, XVII Corps

3rd Division

=== XVIII Corps, Army of the James ===
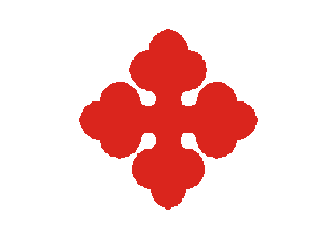
Union Army 1st Division Badge, XVIII Corps

1st Division

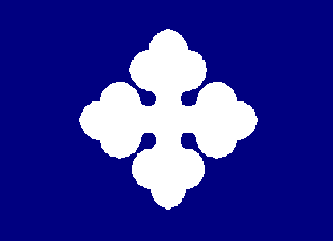
Union Army 2nd Division Badge, XVIII Corps

2nd Division

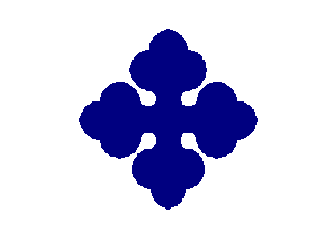
Union Army 3rd Division Badge, XVIII Corps

3rd Division

=== XIX Corps, Middle Military Division ===
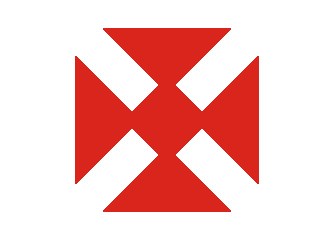
Union Army 1st Division Badge, XIX Corps

1st Division

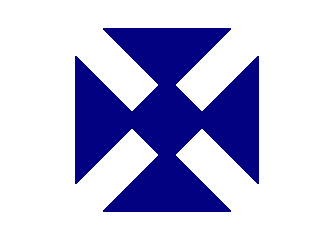
Union Army 2nd Division Badge, XIX Corps

2nd Division

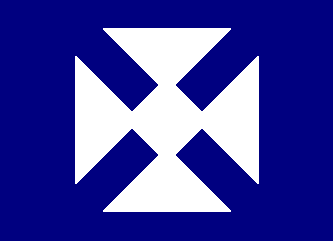
Union Army 3rd Division Badge, XIX Corps

3rd Division

=== XX Corps, Army of the Cumberland ===
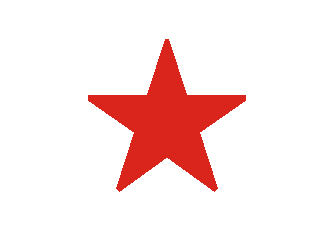
Union Army 1st Division Badge, XX Corps

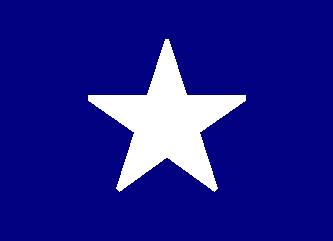
Union Army 2nd Division Badge, XX Corps

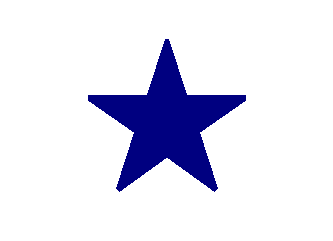
Union Army 3rd Division Badge, XX Corps

1st Division
2nd Division
3rd Division

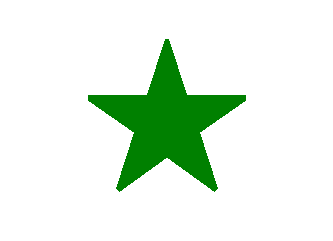
Union Army 4th Division Badge, XX Corps

4th Division|

{Note:XX Corps Badges same as the old XII Corps; the XX Corps was consolidated from the XI and XII Corps}

=== XXI Corps ===
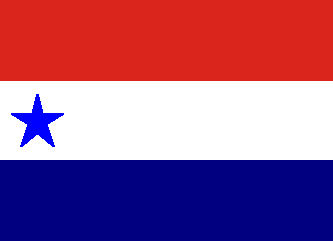
Union Army 1st Division Badge, XXI Corps

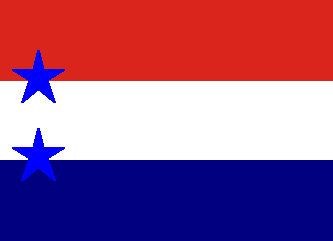
Union Army 2nd Division Badge, XXI Corps

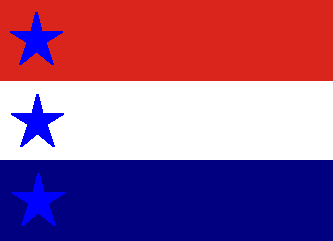
Union Army 3rd Division Badge, XXI Corps

1st Division
2nd Division
3rd Division

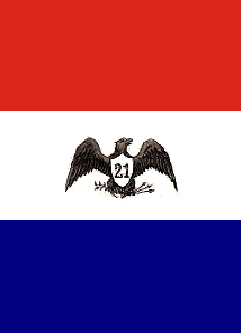
Union Army Headquarters Badge, XXI Corps

Headquarters

=== XXII Corps, Dept of Washington ===
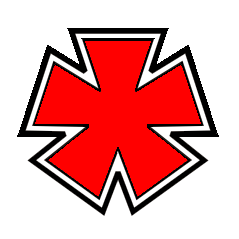
Union Army 1st Division Badge, XXII Corps

1st Division

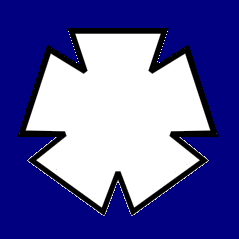
Union Army 2nd Division Badge, XXII Corps

2nd Division

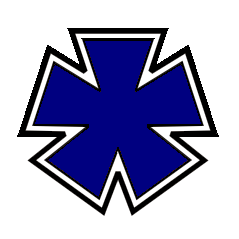
Union Army 3rd Division Badge, XXII Corps

3rd Division

=== XXIII Corps, Dept of Ohio & Dept of North Carolina ===
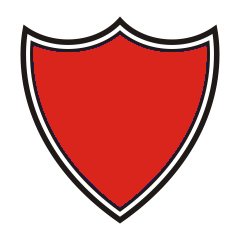
Union Army 1st Division Badge, XXIII Corps

1st Division

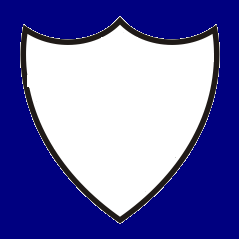
Union Army 2nd Division Badge, XXIII Corps

2nd Division

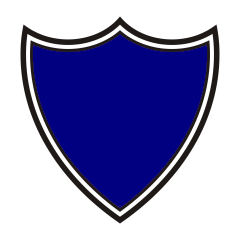
Union Army 3rd Division Badge, XXIII Corps

3rd Division

=== XXIV Corps, Dept of Virginia ===
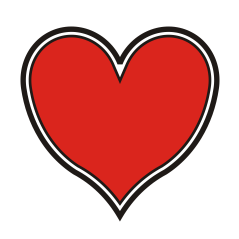
Union Army 1st Division Badge, XXIV Corps

1st Division

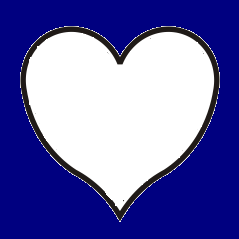
Union Army 2nd Division Badge, XXIV Corps

2nd Division

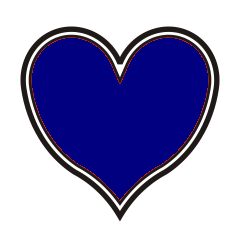
Union Army 3rd Division Badge, XXIV Corps

3rd Division

=== XXV Corps, Army of the James, Dept of Texas ===
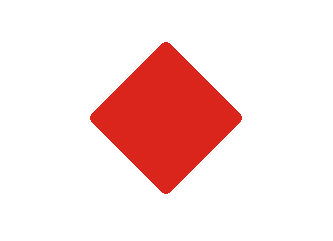
Union Army 1st Division Badge, XXV Corps

1st Division

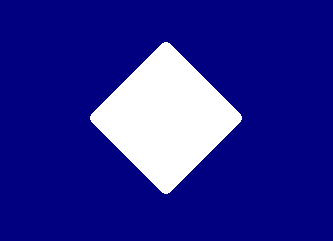
Union Army 2nd Division Badge, XXV Corps

2nd Division

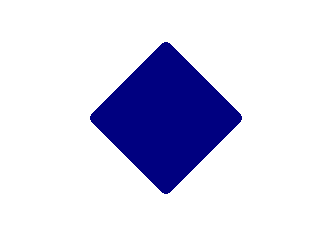
Union Army 3rd Division Badge, XXV Corps

3rd Division

== Brigade badges ==
I Corps, Army of the Potomac

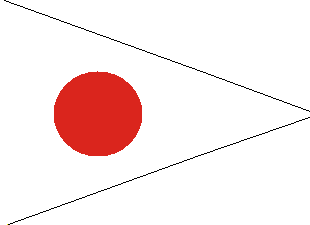
Union Army I Corps, 1st Division Badge, 1st Brigade

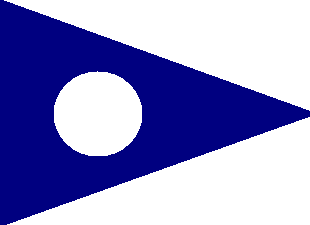
Union Army I Corps, 2nd Division Badge, 1st Brigade

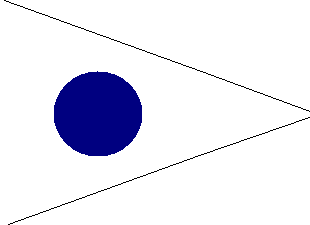
Union Army I Corps, 3rd Division Badge, 1st Brigade

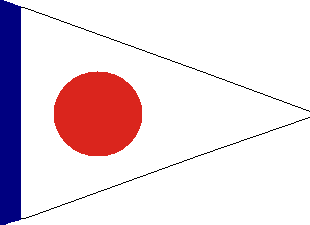
Union Army I Corps, 1st Division Badge, 2nd Brigade

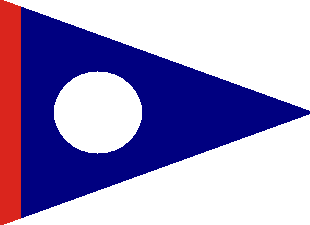
Union Army I Corps, 2nd Division Badge, 2nd Brigade

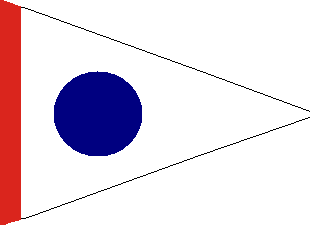
Union Army I Corps, 3rd Division Badge, 2nd Brigade

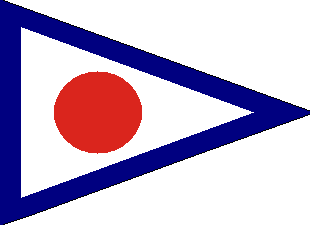
Union Army I Corps, 1st Division Badge, 3rd Brigade

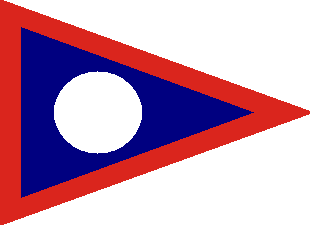
Union Army I Corps, 2nd Division Badge, 3rd Brigade

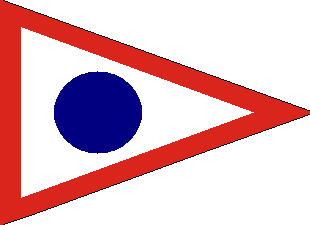
Union Army I Corps, 3rd Division Badge, 3rd Brigade

== See also ==
- Major organizations of the Union Army
- Kearny Cross
- Corps insignia of the United States Army
