= Ella Loraine Dorsey =

American author, journalist, translator

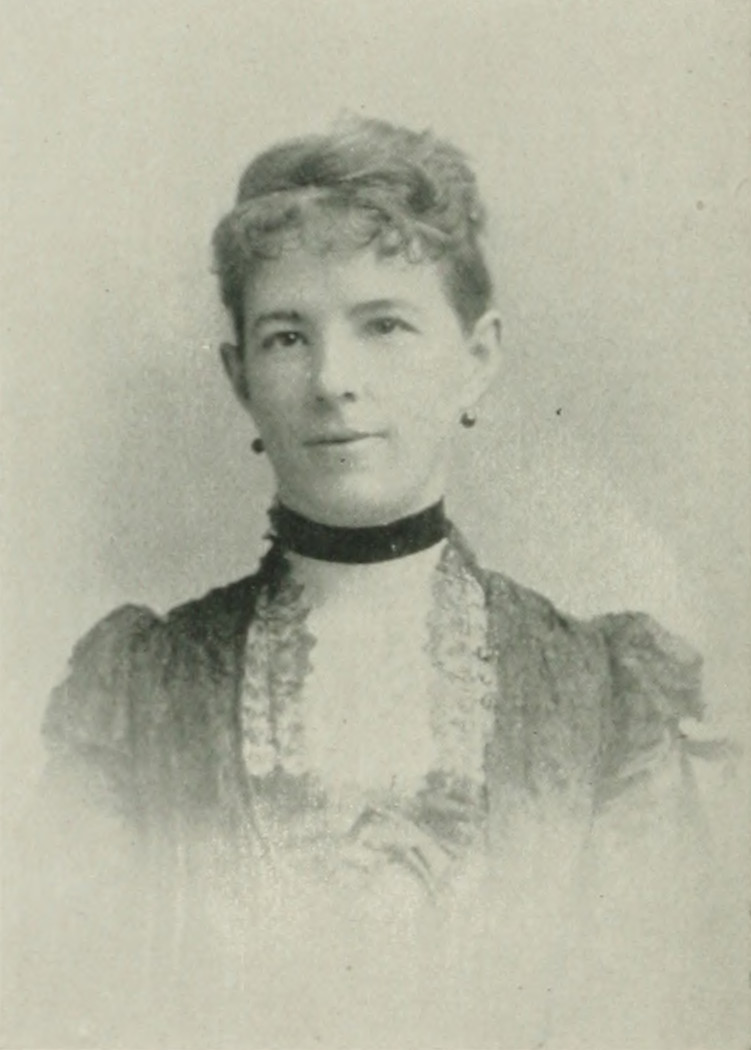
- Photo in A Woman of the Century
- Born: March 2, 1853; Washington, D.C., U.S.
- Died: November 4, 1935 (aged 82); Washington, D. C., U.S.
- Resting place: Mount Olivet Cemetery, Washington, D.C., U.S.
- Education: Georgetown Academy of the Visitation
- Occupations: Author, journalist, translator
- Writing career
- Pen name: E. L. Dorsey
- Language: English
- Genre: juvenile literature

Ella Loraine Dorsey (pen name, E. L. Dorsey; March 2, 1853 – November 4, 1935) was an American author, journalist, and translator. She contributed articles to magazines and wrote many stories. These included Midshipman Bob, Jet, the War Mule, The Taming of Polly, The Children of Avalon, The Jose Maria, The Two Tramps, Saxty's Angel, Pickle and Pepper, The End of the White Man's Trail, and Pocahontas. She entered journalistic work in 1871, and for ten years was a special correspondent and special writer on Washington, D.C. newspapers, subsequently serving in a similar capacity for newspapers in Chicago, Boston and Cincinnati. In 1886, she specialized in the writing of Catholic juvenile fiction. She was one of the indexers and Russian translators in the Scientific Library of the United States Department of the Interior, and during the Spanish–American War, was a volunteer assistant in the Hospital Corps of the Daughters of the American Revolution, serving on the executive staff and handling all correspondence relating to Roman Catholic Sisters who served as contract nurses in the United States, Cuba and Puerto Rico. Dorsey was a member of the advisory board of Trinity College. She was also a member and officer of the Daughters of the American Revolution, Colonial Dames, and other patriotic societies.

== Early life and education ==
Ella Loraine (sometimes spelled Lorraine) Dorsey was born in Washington, D.C., March 2, 1853. She was the youngest child of Lorenzo Dorsey, a Baltimore judge, and Anna Hanson Dorsey, the pioneer of Catholic light literature in America. Born a few years before the breaking out of the Civil War, her early childhood was spent amid border life. The entire family on both sides were in the Confederacy, with the exception of her father and her only brother, who died on the ramparts of "Fort Hell", where he had dashed up with the colors, caught from the color-bearer, and stood cheering his comrades to the charge. Dorsey represents old and illustrious families of Maryland, counting among her family and connections two signers of the Declaration of Independence, eight signers of the Act of the Maryland Convention of 26th July, 1776, two Presidents, seven Governors, thirty-six commissioned officers in the Continental Army, and a number of the heroes of the Maryland Line, who died on the field at the Battle of Long Island, Battle of Harlem Heights, and Fort Washington.

She was educated at Madam C. B. Burr's French and English School and the Georgetown Academy of the Visitation.

== Career ==
Dorsey began her literary career as a journalist and was for several years the "Vanity Fair" of the Washington Critic, leaving that paper to take a special correspondence on the Chicago Tribune. John Boyle O'Reilly and the Rev. D. E. Hudson, editor of the Ave Maria, urged her into magazine work. Her first three stories appeared almost simultaneously, "The Knickerbocker Ghost" and "The Tsar's Horses" in the Catholic World and "Back from the Frozen Pole" in Harper's Magazine. "The Tsar's Horses" traveled round the world, its last reproduction being in New Zealand. It was attributed at first, because of its accuracy of detail, to Archibald Forbes, the war correspondent. Dorsey's specialty was boys' stories. Midshipman Bob went through two editions in the United States and England in its first year, and was since translated into Italian. Scarcely second to it in popularity was Saxty's Angel and The Two Tramps, while two poems printed in the Cosmopolitan were received with marked favor. For many years, she served as special correspondent for Washington, Chicago, Boston, and Cincinnati papers. She worked as an indexer and Russian translator for Scientific Library, U.S. Department of the Interior, Washington, D. C.

Dorsey was the author of "Three Months with Small wood's Immortals", a sketch written for and read before the Washington branch of that society. Other sketches included, "Women in the Patent Office," "Women in the Pension Office," and "Women in the Land Office" which were prepared by her for the Chautauquan. They attracted much attention and secured wide recognition for the ladies who toiled at their department desks. In addition to a large number of contributions to the press and many periodicals, she was the author of the following books: Midshipman Bob, Jet, the War Mule, The Taming of Polly, The Children of Avalon, The Jose Maria, The Two Tramps, Saxty's Angel, Pickle and Pepper, The End of the White Man's Trail, and Pocahontas.

== Personal life ==
She was a member of the advisory and auxiliary boards of Trinity College, and in 1900, 1903 and 1907 traveled in the interest of the institution, securing substantial amounts for its endowment. She was a member of the Daughters of the American Revolution (later serving on the Continental Hall Committee), Colonial Dames of Maryland, Georgetown Academy of the Visitation Alumnae Association, Auxiliary Board of Providence Hospital, Pocahontas Memorial Association, Association for Roman Catholic Indian Education, and an honorary member of the Association of Spanish War Nurses. She penned the article on the Georgetown Visitation Convent for the Catholic Encyclopedia.

Dorsey made her home on Washington Heights. She died November 4, 1935, in Washington, D. C., and is buried at Mount Olivet Cemetery, in that city.

== Selected works ==
- Midshipman Bob, 1886
- Smallwood's Immortals: A Historical Abstract, 189?
- Jet, the War-Mule: And Other Stories for Boys and Girls, 1894
- Taming of Polly, 1897
- Pickle and Pepper, 1898
- Pocahontas, 1906
- The Forbidden Dance. (Da-hopi-ke)., 1908
- A Biographical Sketch of James Maccubbin Lingan, One of the Original Proprietors, 1910
- Revolutionary Pension Records Aid in Americanization, 1913
- Our First Naval Constructor, 1928
