= The True Woman =

American anti-suffragist publication

- Editress: Charlotte Elizabeth McKay
- Categories: Women's societal roles, Anti-suffrage movement, 19th-century social reform
- Frequency: Monthly
- Publisher: Sherwood & Co., Baltimore
- First issue: April 1871
- Final issue: December 1873
- Country: United States
- Based in: Baltimore, Maryland (1871) Washington, DC (1873)
- Language: English

The True Woman was a monthly periodical published from 1871 to 1873 in Baltimore, Maryland. Edited by Charlotte Elizabeth McKay, a former Union nurse and missionary, the journal aimed to promote conservative values regarding women's roles and responsibilities in society. It served as a platform for anti-suffragist sentiments while supporting certain progressive reforms related to women's education and employment.

== History ==
=== Background ===
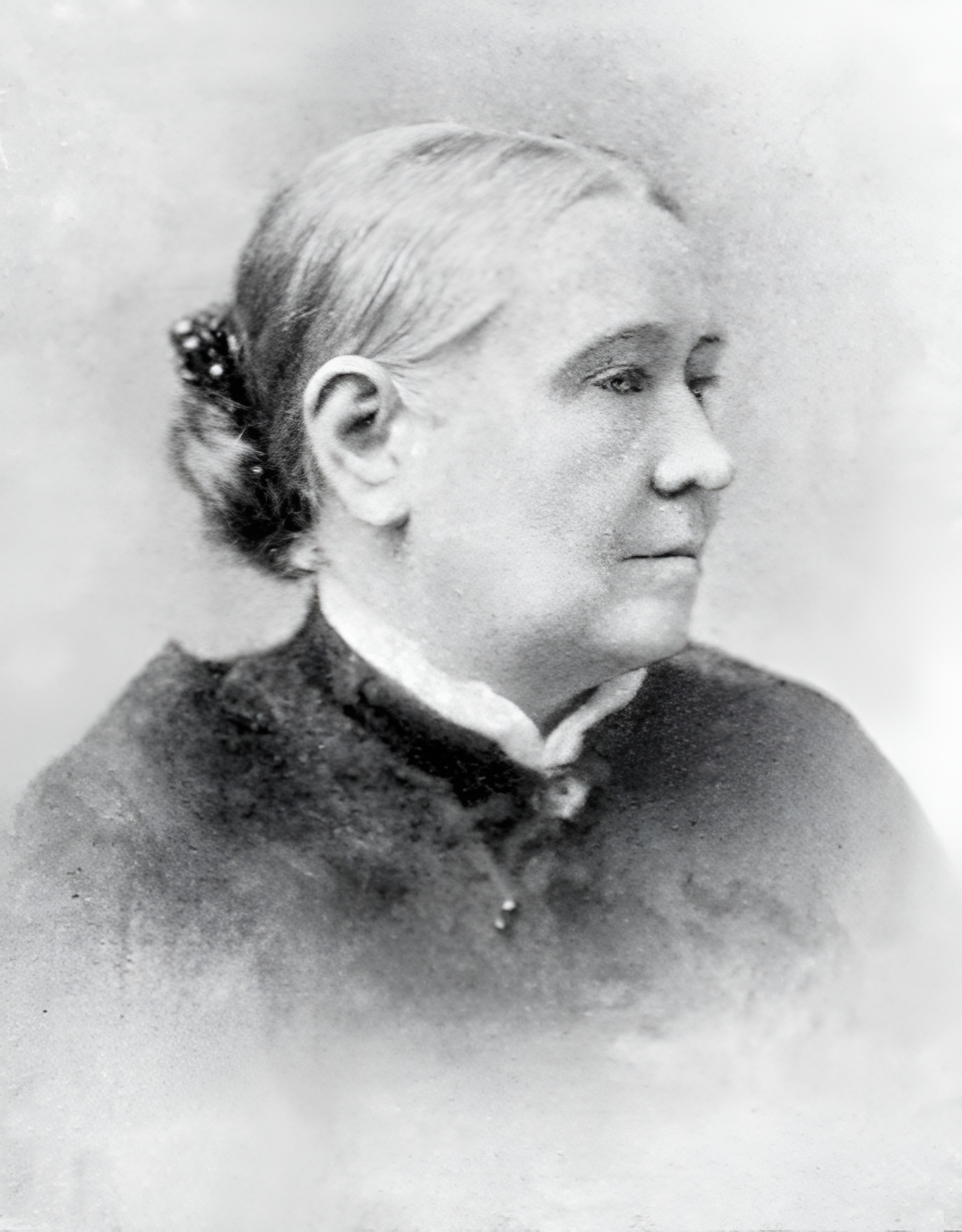
Madeleine Vinton Dahlgren (c. 1893)

Charlotte McKay, a Baltimore widow with significant experience as a wartime nurse and missionary, felt that the surge in women's activism post-1861 was being hijacked by a small, unrepresentative group aiming for political ambitions rather than genuine societal reform. She feared that this shift was leading women away from their natural roles in the family, thus disrupting household harmony. McKay was particularly troubled by the influence of free-love doctrines and what she saw as radical changes in family dynamics.

This organized resistance—referred to by Beecher as a significant "counter-influence"—aimed to rally the "quiet and silent" women across the United States. Emulating strategies used by the women's rights movement, they established a formal organization, lobbied Congress, and launched their own publication. This final initiative was particularly crucial, as McKay and Dahlgren shared Beecher's view that advocates for women's rights had largely dominated the public narrative. Determined to level the playing field, they introduced The True Woman in April 1871. Edited by McKay and based in Baltimore, the monthly journal blended political commentary with lighter literary content, with its editors closely tracking ongoing national debates.

For example, when Susan Fenimore Cooper released a two-part essay on “Female Suffrage” in Harper’s Monthly, The True Woman praised not only Cooper for her work but also the publishers for having the courage to print it. The journal argued that it was high time for the press to take a strong stand against what they saw as a distortion of the "Rights of the True Woman."

Throughout the nineteenth century the remonstrants or the anti-suffragists, had little difficulty publishing in general periodicals.

=== Anti-Sixteenth Amendment Society ===
In response to efforts to pass a women's suffrage amendment, McKay joined forces with other prominent women—including Catharine Beecher, Madeleine Vinton Dahlgren, Almira Lincoln Phelps, and Susan Fenimore Cooper—to form the Anti-Sixteenth Amendment Society. This organization sought to mobilize opposition to women's suffrage among those who believed it contradicted traditional values. Supported by The True Woman, the society initiated a petition campaign that gathered approximately 5,000 signatures, presenting it as evidence of widespread opposition to suffrage among women. They argued that granting women the right to vote would be compulsory and oppressive, infringing upon their natural roles in society.

== Content ==
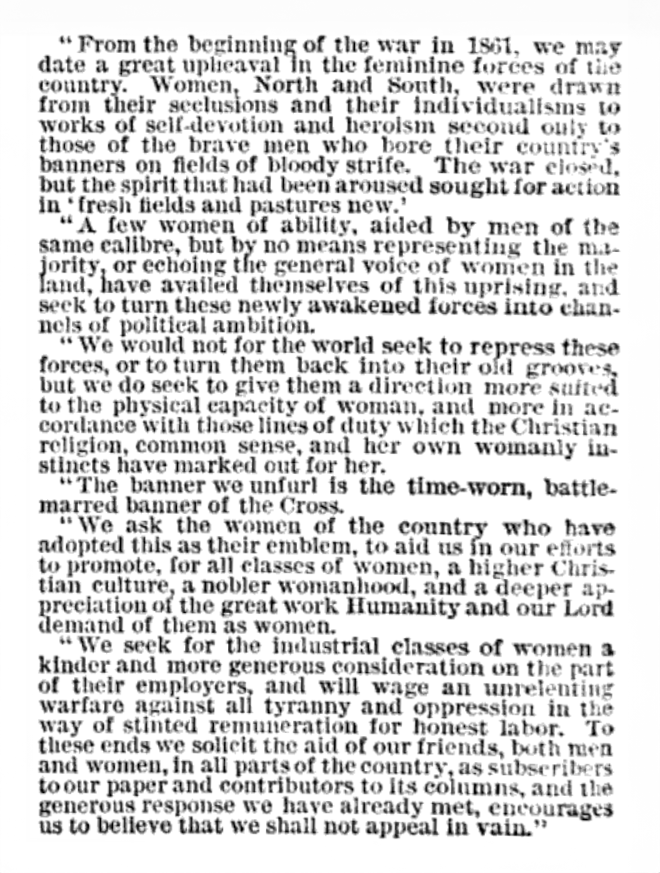
Introduction discussing the launch of "The True Woman" as it appears in Godey's Lady's Book (1871)

The periodical The True Woman seamlessly blended literary content with its political commentary, featuring essays, poems, short stories, and sketches that reflected its views on women's societal roles. These pieces emphasized themes of piety, domestic responsibilities, and moral values. The selection of literary works was deliberate, often used to critique the women's rights movement. For example, Susan Fenimore Cooper's essays on "Female Suffrage" were chosen because they aligned with the magazine's perspectives.

In addition to its literary content, the magazine actively countered pro-suffrage publications by combining political commentary with articles that challenged the arguments of the women's rights movement. It supported initiatives like the Anti-Sixteenth Amendment Society's petition campaign against women's suffrage. Figures such as Catharine Beecher argued that a significant majority of women—estimated at 90%—opposed suffrage, suggesting that despite the visibility of pro-suffrage literature, most thoughtful women did not see the need for voting rights.

Despite being viewed as reactionary due to its opposition to suffrage, The True Woman also advocated for certain social reforms. The periodical supported expanding educational and employment opportunities for women, improving wages, and securing legal rights. This demonstrated a commitment to addressing broader social issues affecting women, indicating that its focus extended beyond merely opposing suffrage.

The True Woman questioned how women could feel "unrepresented" or even "enslaved" when they were at the heart of family life and had a significant role in shaping the men who represented them.

=== First issue ===
In its first issue, the periodical included a letter to Congress petitioning against women's suffrage. Editors like Mrs. Almira Lincoln Phelps and Madeleine Vinton Dahlgren argued that the vocal pro-suffrage minority did not reflect the views of most American women. While opposing women's entry into politics, they supported fair wages and better working conditions, emphasizing that women's energies, awakened during the Civil War, should focus on roles aligned with their strengths, Christian values, and societal duties. The petition urged Congress to distinguish between suffragists' demands and what they saw as the true desires of most women, who valued their roles in family life over political involvement. The magazine positioned itself as a voice for these women, promoting traditional roles alongside practical social reforms.

== Contributors ==
The periodical combined political discourse with literary contributions, featuring works by figures such as the following:

- Anna Hanson Dorsey - A prolific Catholic novelist who contributed literary works to the periodical.
- Madeline Vinten Dahlgren - Known for her anti-suffrage defense; contributed articles including one on journalism and women suffrage.
- Mary Abigail Dodge (Gail Hamilton) - A writer who initially supported women's rights but later opposed women's suffrage; contributed essays.
- Susan Fenimore Cooper - An author and naturalist who wrote about female suffrage in New Jersey.
- Catherine Beecher - An educator and writer who advocated for women's education but opposed women's suffrage.
- Harriet Beecher Stowe - Renowned author; while an advocate for women's rights, sometimes critiqued the movement in her writings.
- Sarah Lanman Hopper - A missionary and writer who contributed articles to the publication.
- Almira Lincoln Phelps - An educator and author who wrote about the lives and characters of distinguished women, promoting women's education.
- Emma Willard - An advocate for women's education; her views on female suffrage were referenced in discussions within the periodical.
- Eleanor Boyle Ewing Sherman - Founder of Washington, DC-based Anti-Woman Suffrage Society; published the periodical in D.C.
- Lydia Huntley Sigourney - A poet and author who wrote about the role of women and societal changes.

== Legacy ==
=== Disestablishment ===
The periodical moved to Washington for its last few issues.

Despite its growing success and increasing readership, the publication was discontinued in December 1873. McKay announced that the decision to cease publication was due to personal reasons. The decision to stop the publication came at a time when the suffrage movement was waning in popularity, as evidenced by declining turnout at women's rights meetings in major cities like Washington and Boston.

Many of the magazine's readers, as well as others interested in women's welfare, expressed regret over its closure. The publication had carved out a niche by focusing on what McKay and her supporters viewed as the true roles and contributions of women, outside of the political sphere.

=== Contemporary reception ===
Throughout its short-lived existence, the True Woman paid close attention and responded directly to articles published in other newspapers and magazines.

In her 1871 work Woman Suffrage and Woman's Profession, Catharine Beecher proposed countering the woman suffrage movement by promoting traditional roles for women through newspapers, tracts, and clergy endorsements. She also advocated for establishing a University for Women focused on health and domestic training to support women teachers and prepare students for roles in family and community health.

According to a review in Arthur's Home Magazine, Volume 41 (1873), the periodical was praised for delivering on its title's promise. The review noted that the book is "full of information valuable to all women, though especially important to wives and mothers." It was described as a handbook whose instructions, if followed, could greatly influence women's well-being and have a significant and beneficial impact on both present and future generations. The magazine also commended the book's "excellent" mechanical execution.

== See also ==
- Cult of Domesticity – A prevailing value system in the 19th century that emphasized women's roles within the home and family.
- Women's education in the United States – Covering the history and development of educational opportunities for women.
- Arthur's Home Magazine – The publication that provided a contemporary review of the periodical.
- Anti-suffrage movement in the United States – Detailing the movement opposing women's suffrage.
- History of feminism – Providing context on the evolving roles and rights of women during the period.
