= Kearny Cross =

Military decoration of the United States Army

The Kearny Medal and subsequent Kearny Cross were unofficial military decorations awarded by units of the United States Army during the American Civil War.

The Kearny Medal was created in 1862 by the officers of the 1st Division, 3rd Corps, of the Union Army of the Potomac, which had served under Major General Philip Kearny. Intended for award to any Union officer who had performed acts of extreme bravery and heroism in the face of the enemy, it was first bestowed on November 29, 1862. The following year, a medal was created by Black, Starr & Frost. In 1863, the medal was authorized retroactively to officers who had performed such acts while enlisted soldiers, and had been subsequently commissioned.

On March 13, 1863, a second version of the Kearny Medal was established as a "Cross of Valor" for enlisted personnel. The new medal, known as the Kearny Cross, was awarded to any Union soldier who had displayed meritorious, heroic, or distinguished acts in the face of an enemy force.

By 1865, both the Kearny Medal and the Kearny Cross were commonly referred to as the Kearny Cross. Since the decorations were issued by local commanders, the medals remained unofficial awards and were not issued after the close of the Civil War. Nevertheless, the Kearny Cross and Medal are regarded as one of the oldest military decorations of the United States Army, second only to the Badge of Military Merit and the Fidelity Medallion.

== Women awarded the cross ==
General David Birney awarded the award to Anna Etheridge, a nurse and vivandiere born on May 3, 1839 (or 1844). Also known as "Gentle Annie", she received the award for her bravery.

Marie Tepe, (1834-1901) also known as "French Mary", a famous vivandiere of the Civil War, was one of at least three women who served during the battle of Gettysburg, the other well documented example being a currently unidentifiable woman, whose body was found amongst the many Confederate dead after Pickett's Charge. While serving under the 114th Pennsylvania Volunteers, also known as the Collis' Zouaves d'Afrique, she received the award for being wounded in the ankle. She was in 13 battles, and carried a .44 caliber pistol.

Charlotte Elizabeth McKay received the Kearney Cross from the officers of the 17th Maine Volunteer Infantry Regiment, whom she had cared for after the Battle of Chancellorsville.

== See also ==
- American Civil War Corps Badges
