= Vivandière =

French military canteen personnel

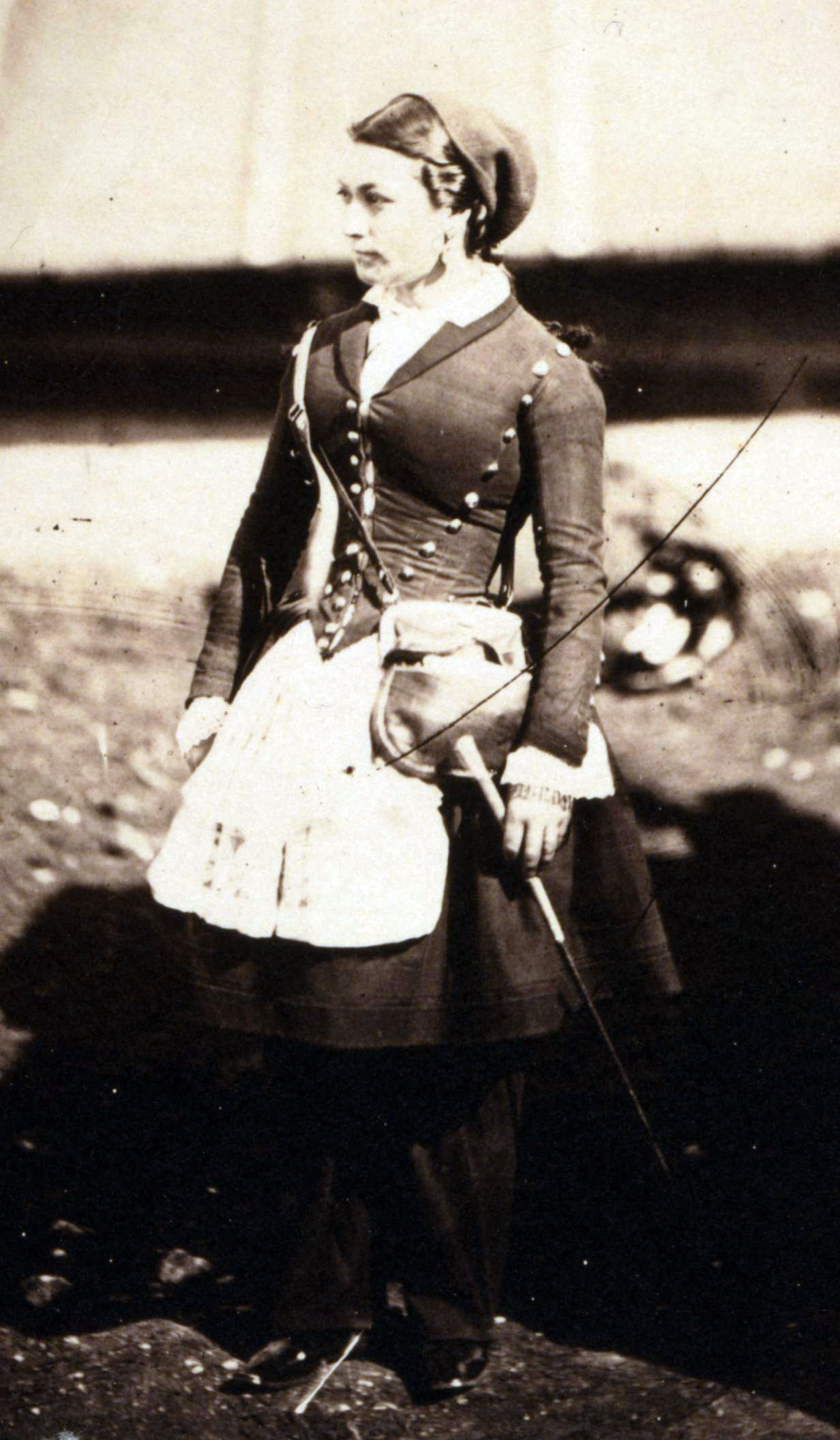
A French cantinière in the Crimea during the Crimean War in 1855, photographed by Roger Fenton

Vivandière or cantinière is a French name for women who are attached to military regiments as sutlers or canteen keepers. Their actual historic functions of selling wine to the troops and working in canteens led to the adoption of the name 'cantinière' which came to supplant the original 'vivandière' starting in 1793. The use of both terms was common in French until the mid-19th century, and 'vivandière' remained the term of choice in non-French-speaking countries such as the US, Spain, Italy, and Great Britain. Vivandières served in the French army up until the beginning of World War I, but the custom (and the name) spread to many other armies. Vivandières also served on both sides in the American Civil War, and in the armies of Spain, Italy, the German states, Switzerland, and various armies in South America, though little is known about the details in most of those cases as historians have not done extensive research on them.

== Origins ==
The origins of vivandières are impossible to pin down with precision. Soldiers' wives traveled with armies far back into history, and, in the years before 1700, armies often had more women and children than soldiers. By 1700, there was a clear category of women accompanying the French army, composed of soldiers' legitimate wives who served as vivandières. Until the French Revolution, the legal right to sell food, drink, and sundries like tobacco, wig powder, writing paper and ink to the soldiers in any regiment belonged solely to eight soldiers known as vivandiers.

== Role ==
As serving soldiers (vivandiers) were often too busy with their military duties to spend much time selling, their colonels granted them permission to marry. Their wives became de facto 'vivandières' (the female version of 'vivandiers'). This private enterprise provisioning operation was needed because the logistical system seldom supplied the troops with food, drink, or other items beyond basic rations. If the troops could not get these things in camp, they would forage to get them outside, and the army feared that this would lead to desertions. Allowing vivandières to supplement army rations for a profit kept the troops in camp and thus lessened the chance of desertion.

== France ==
=== Revolutionary period ===
The French Revolution of 1789 destroyed the rigid, aristocratic structure of the French army. Many noble officers left the country, and those that remained were politically suspect. Thousands of common soldiers also deserted in the general chaos. When France went to war with the monarchs of Europe in 1792, the army was a shell of its former self.

One key problem was that discipline and order had broken down. Thousands of women, many of them girlfriends or prostitutes, traveled with the armies, eating rations, consuming supplies, and taking up space. A small number of female soldiers, or femmes soldats also enlisted in the ranks and fought openly alongside the men. In addition, the usual (and vital) vivandières continued to accompany the army.

At the same time, women's political groups in Paris, such as the Society of Revolutionary Republican Women, agitated for equal rights for women since men had been freed by the Revolution. The male revolutionaries were rarely radical when it came to women's rights – they wanted to make the armies more efficient. And they wanted to repress women's political aspirations and keep French women in subservient roles.

The result was a series of laws from April through October 1793. The Law to Rid the Armies of Useless Women passed the National Convention on April 30, 1793. It banned all women from the armies, including female soldiers. This suited the political agenda of the government, since military service was equated with citizenship. However, the law specifically allowed women to remain with the army if they fell into one of two categories: laundresses ("blanchisseuses") and vivandières.

The term 'cantinière' came into use around 1793, since vivandières ran a 'cantine' in barracks and garrisons, and in their tents on campaign. The new word quickly replaced the old 'vivandière' among most French combat troops, but the War Ministry continued to use a mix of the two words (often interchangeably) until 1854.

=== Napoleonic Wars ===
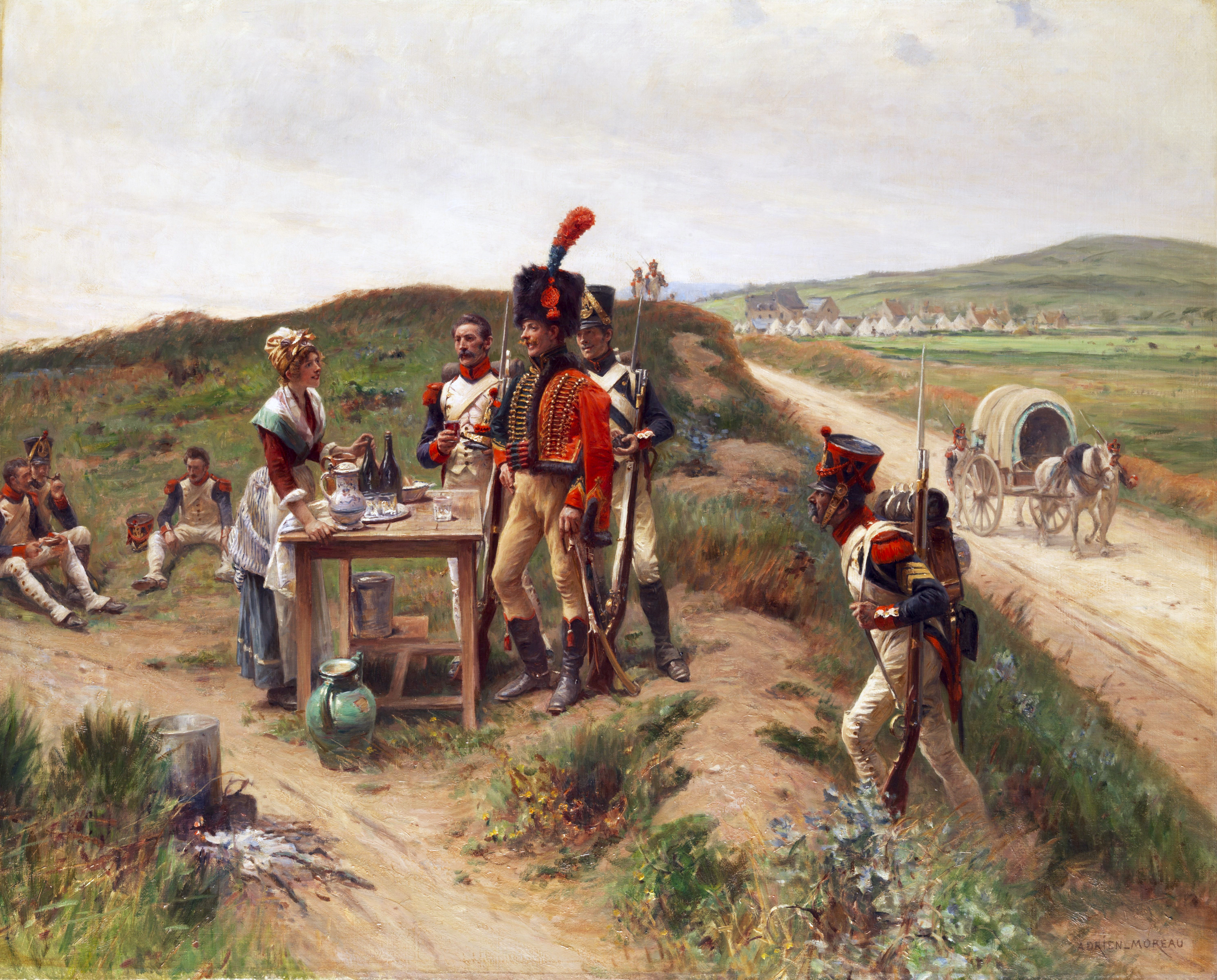
A vivandière (left) with French Imperial Army soldiers

Cantinières expanded their numbers greatly during the Napoleonic Wars, gaining fame for battlefield heroism as well as for nursing the sick and wounded. They were present in every French campaign and battle of the era, creating a legend that survived long afterwards. It was common for cantinières to provide food and drink to the troops while under fire (generally at no charge on days of battle), nurse the wounded, and to generally stiffen morale. A few cantinières reportedly carried muskets and fought in the ranks.

=== Bourbon Restoration and July Monarchy ===
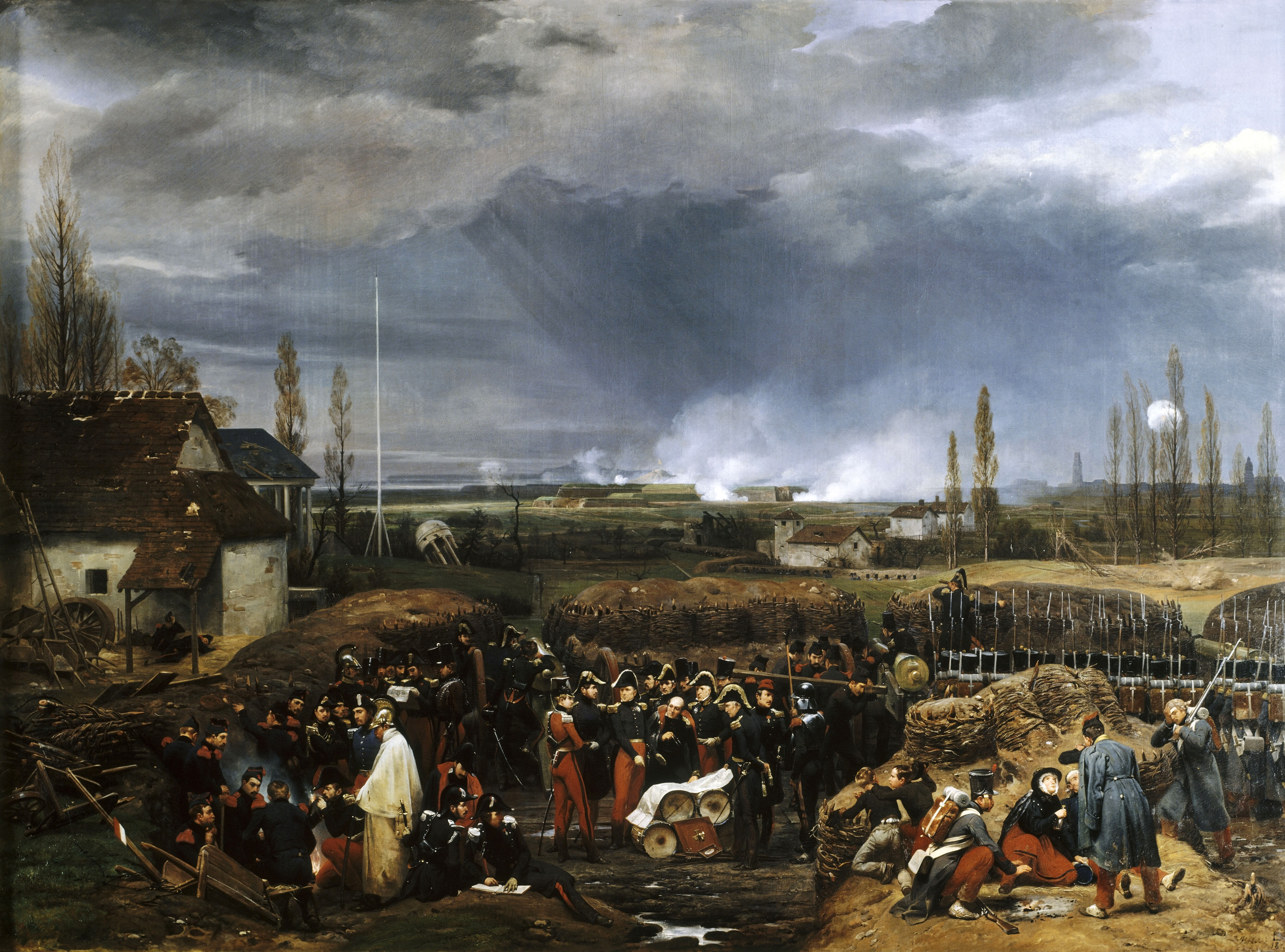
The Siege of Antwerp by Horace Vernet. A cantinière can be seen on the right tending to wounded soldiers

After Napoleon's defeat in 1814–15, the returning Bourbon Monarchy eliminated the title of cantinière and restored the word 'vivandière'. The Bourbons also tried to make vivandière appointments contingent on political loyalty to the monarchy. Soldiers continued to use 'cantinière' though to protect their cantinières from being removed. Cantinières accompanied French troops into Spain in 1823, and into Algeria in 1830. Also in Algeria they began to fashion military uniforms for themselves – a practice that rapidly spread throughout the entire army.

The overthrow of the Bourbon Monarchy of Charles X and the establishment of the July Monarchy in 1830 brought in a new government that was less hostile to the ideas and terminology of the French Revolution. While the new government continued to use 'vivandière' in regulations, 'cantinière' again became almost universally used by the troops, and by the cantinières themselves. These women were present in combat in Algeria from 1830–1848 and beyond.

=== Second Empire ===
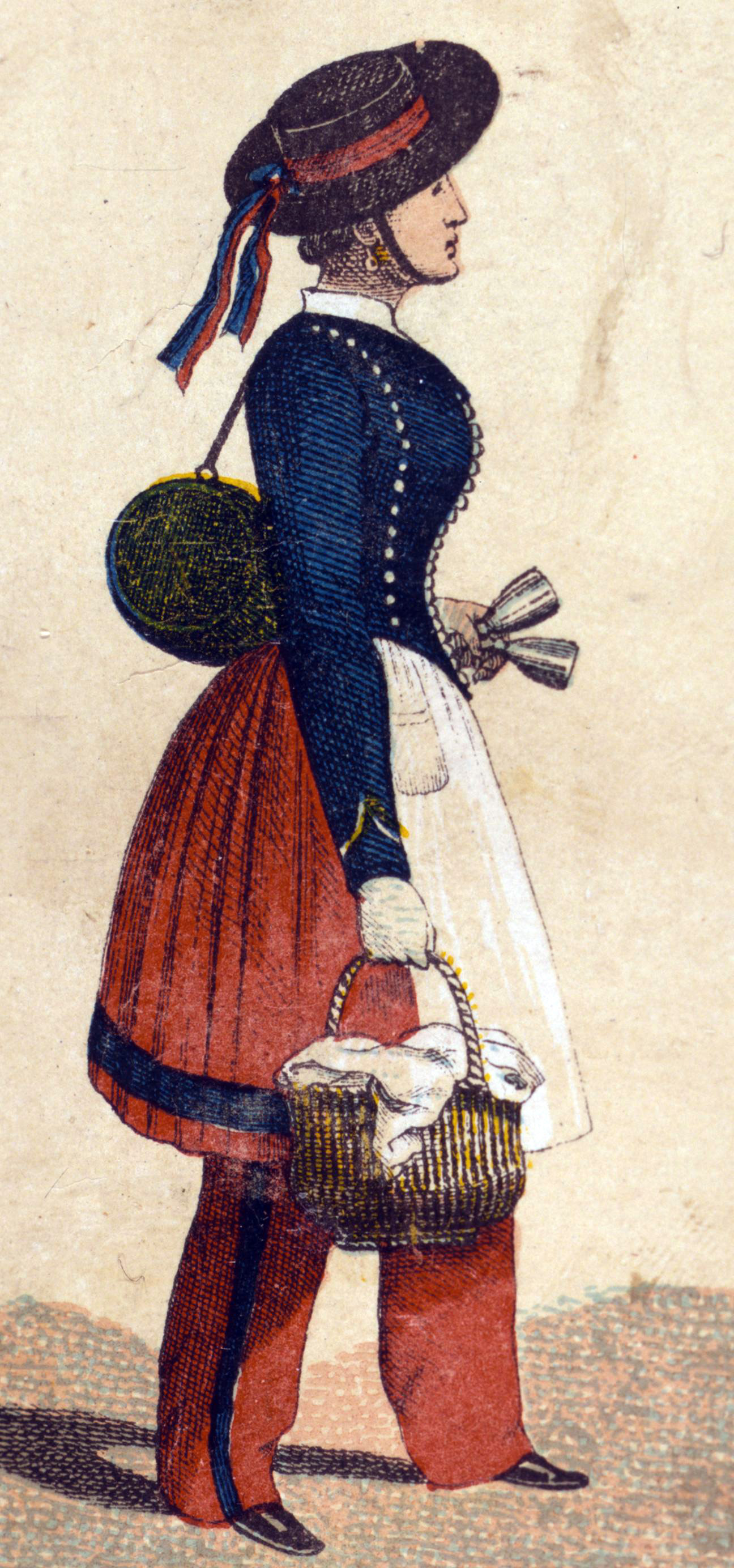
A Sweet Caporal cigarette card (1896) of a cantinière of 1853

During the Second Empire the cantinière achieved a popular, if romanticised, image as a virtual icon of the French military. Napoleon III doubled their numbers in 1854, and they served alongside their units in every campaign of the Second Empire, notably in the Crimean War, the Second Italian War of Independence, the French intervention in Mexico, the Colonization of Cochinchina, and the Franco-Prussian War. Cantinières were present on both sides during the Paris Commune.

In 1854 the previous popular designation of Vivandière was formally abolished, to be replaced by the official title of Cantinière. In 1860 the cantinières were authorised to receive the same medals and other decorations as the male soldiers of their respective regiments.

As part of their newly acquired official status, the cantinières appeared in uniform with their regiments on ceremonial reviews and parades. On these occasions they were placed between the regimental band (musique) and the staff officers of the unit. The actual number of cantinières authorised for each regiment after 1865 varied according to the branch or corps - ranging from one for each battalion of line infantry, through four for artillery, to six for the grenadiers of the Imperial Guard.

=== Third Republic ===
With the adoption of a short-term conscript army under the Third Republic, the cantinières were phased out and replaced by civilian workers who were employed at the regimental depot only and did not wear uniforms. This process began in 1875 with a reduction in the permitted numbers of cantinières, and culminated in 1890 when the War Ministry forbade cantinières to wear uniforms, requiring them instead to wear a simple grey civilian dress and an identifying arm plaque. The new law also forbade cantinières from going on campaign or on maneuvers with their regiments. This effectively ended the role of cantinières as it had been known. In 1905, the War Ministry eliminated cantinières altogether, replacing them with male cantiniers who had to be retired veterans. Women who were still serving were allowed to continue, so that some served up to and even into World War I – but they were not allowed in combat.

The cantiniers turned out to be highly unpopular, and the army eliminated them in 1940. The popular perception among soldiers was that the male cantiniers were greedy, unhelpful, and unpleasant – in contrast to the female cantinières, whom the soldiers largely perceived as generous, selfless, and friendly mother and sister figures.

=== Uniforms ===
By the time of the French intervention in Belgium in 1832, cantinières routinely wore a female version of their regiment's uniform. It generally consisted of a tight-fitting uniform jacket, striped trousers, and a knee-length skirt over the wide-cut pants. This was topped off by a brimmed hat and worn with a tonnelet, or brandy barrel that the cantinière carried on a strap over her shoulder. A collection of colored prints dated 1859 of Second Empire cantinières by the French artist Hyppolyte Lalaisse, show their uniforms as matching the colors of their respective regiments in nearly all cases (for example green jackets and skirts with red facings, the latter worn over red trousers, for the Dragoons of the Imperial Guard).

== American Civil War ==
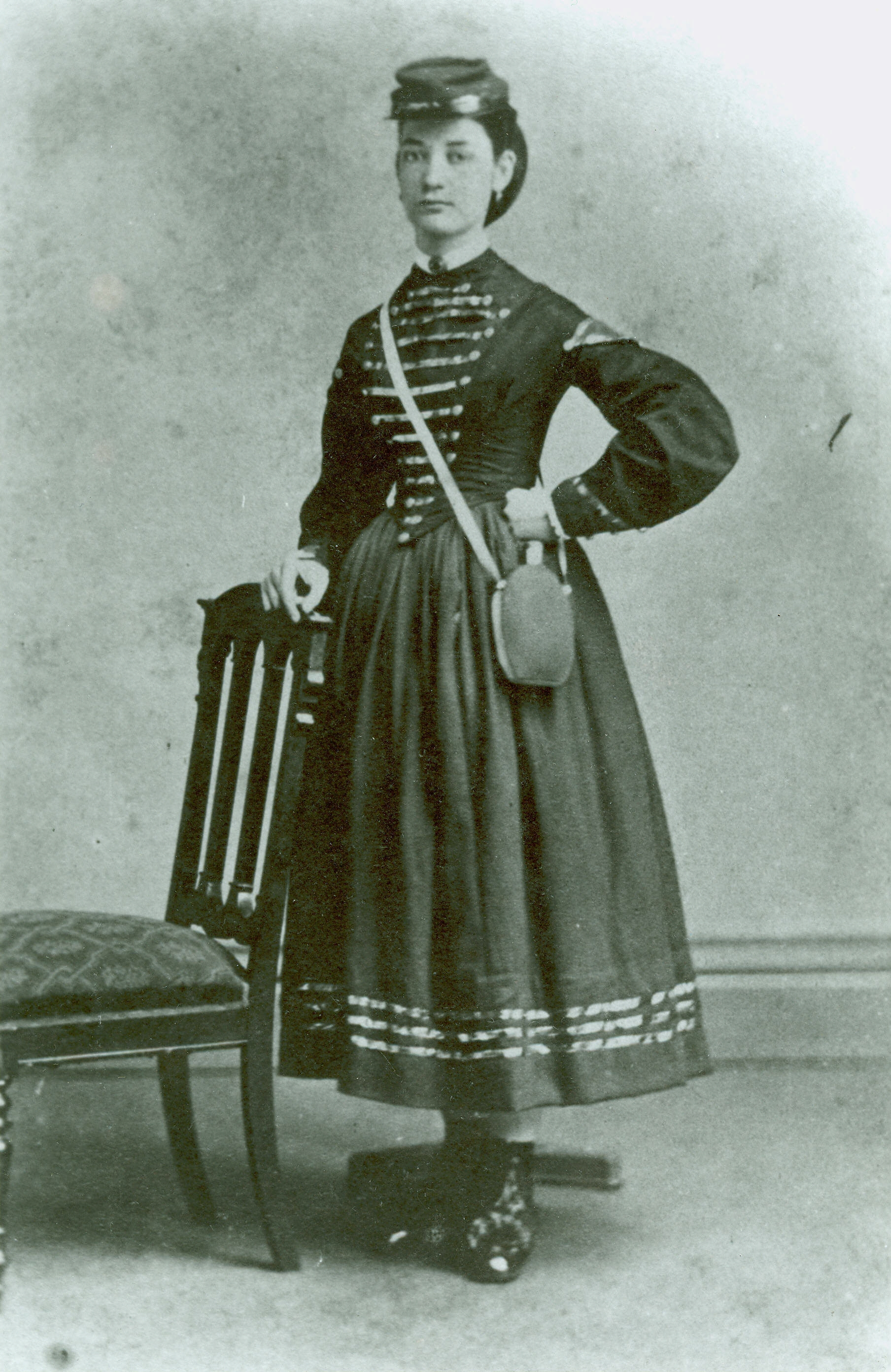
Unidentified American woman during the American Civil War, presumed to be a vivandière

During the Crimean War, the United States War Department sent three United States Army officers to Europe to observe the current art of war there. They brought back the idea of vivandières to America, and during the American Civil War of 1861–1865, many patriotic women on both sides served as vivandières, though exact numbers are unknown, and the practice does not appear to have had the strong and lasting official sanction that it had in France.

One American example was Anna (Annie) Etheridge who lived in Detroit when the American Civil War broke out. Etheridge joined 19 other women in April 1861 who enlisted as vivandières with the Union's 2nd Michigan Volunteer Regiment. When the 2nd Michigan first saw action at Blackburn's Ford, Etheridge was reported to have nursed the wounded and to have brought water to the dying. She served with the Regiment throughout its battles, including both of those at Bull Run. At Chancellorsville, Etheridge was wounded in the hand when a Union officer attempted to hide behind her, and he was ultimately killed and her horse wounded. For her courage under fire, Etheridge was one of only two women awarded the Kearny Cross, named in honor of Gen. Philip Kearny. The other recipient was Franco-Turkish, Marie Tepe. Another Civil War vivandiere was Kady Brownell.

== Spain ==
There is documented evidence of cantinières serving in the civil wars of the 1870s in Spain. During the Second Rif War of 1909–1910 a photograph of "Senorita Asuncion Martos, Cantinera of the Talavera Battalion in Morocco" was published in the Illustrated London News, under the heading "The vivandière still a factor in modern warfare". In the photograph Senorita Martos wears a female version of the tropical uniform of the soldiers for whom she is pouring wine against a background of military tents, indicating that the classical role of the Spanish cantinière continued to a later date than that of her French counterpart.

== In popular culture ==
French vivandières and cantinières frequently appeared in popular entertainment in the 19th century, from operas and musicals to picture postcards. In opera, the most well-known example is Marie in Donizetti's La fille du régiment – the "Daughter of the Regiment". In this case she is a vivandière, though her portrayal in the opera is inaccurate. Even in 1840, popular culture could present a badly distorted, romanticized view of these women. Vivandières also appear in Act 3, Scene 3 of La forza del destino, and W. S. Gilbert's La Vivandière is a burlesque based on Donizetti's opera. Portrayals of cantinières and vivandières continue today to be popular among re-enactors, and a number of major companies and products continue to use the name or the image of these women in their advertising.

In Louisa May Alcott's Little Women (1868–69), Jo March expresses a wish to become a vivandière for the Union Army: "Don't I wish I could go as a drummer, a vivan – what's its name? Or a nurse, so I could be near him and help him."

Vivandière, directed by James R. Temple, is an American independent film looking at the role from the eyes of two young women during the American Civil War. "Two young women from both sides of the Civil War volunteer as battlefield nurses, facing down scornful commanders and murderous war criminals to accomplish their hazardous duty." Starring Robin Black, Mikyla Bordner, Dallan Starks.

== See also ==
- Army Catering Corps - branch of the British Army responsible for feeding army units
- Camp follower – Civilians who follow armies
- Culinary specialist (United States Navy) – United States Navy occupational rating
- Soldaderas – Female participants in the Mexican Revolution
- Sutler – Merchant who provisions an army in the field or camp
