= Anna Etheridge =

American Civil War nurse

Lorinda Anna Blair Etheridge
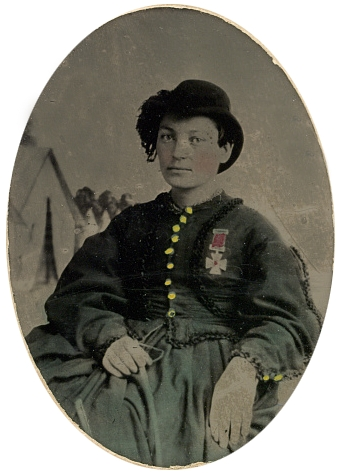
- Annie Etheridge with Kearny Cross medal
- Born: May 3, 1839; Wayne County, Michigan, US
- Died: January 23, 1913 (aged 73); Washington, D.C., US
- Occupation: Nurse

Lorinda Anna Blair Etheridge (May 3, 1839 – January 23, 1913) was a Union nurse and vivandière who served during the American Civil War. She was one of only two women to receive the Kearny Cross. She was inducted into the Michigan Women's Hall of Fame in 2010.

Anna Etheridge was born Lorinda Anna Blair in 1839 in Wayne County, Michigan. In 1860, she married her first husband James Etheridge. At the outbreak of the American Civil War, Etheridge enlisted in the 2nd Michigan Volunteer Infantry Regiment, serving as a nurse and vivandière. Her desire to become a nurse stemmed from caring for her father before his death. Before the war, Etheridge worked in a hospital with a poor reputation for patient care, which she had attempted to improve.

== During the war ==
Etheridge joined as a laundress when her husband enlisted in the 2nd Michigan Infantry Regiment. She later served as the daughter of the 3rd Michigan Infantry Regiment. Though her husband soon deserted, Etheridge served throughout the rest of the war with the 5th Michigan Infantry. When the regiment went on campaign, the other laundresses went home, but Etheridge stayed with the regiment. She was described as young, attractive, modest, quiet, and hard-working. Supposedly, if anyone treated her with disrespect, they would have to fight the entire regiment. After General Philip Kearny saw her caring for wounded men during the Peninsula campaign, he "adopted" her into his III Corps division. He provided her with a horse, saddle, and sergeant's pay, while her nominal title was cook for the officers mess. She typically wore a black riding habit with sergeant's chevrons.

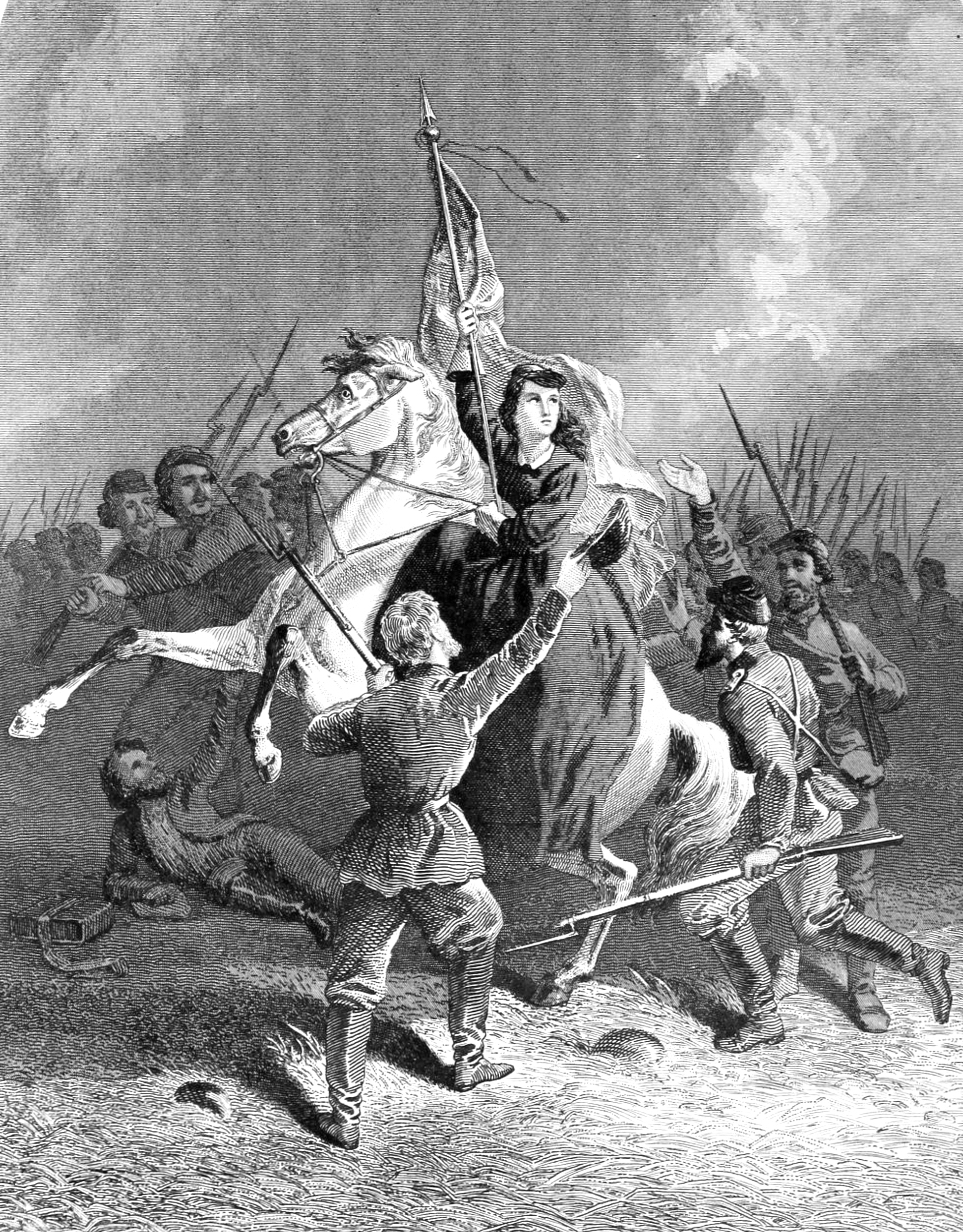
Annie Etheridge

Etheridge was famous for her courageous work under fire, her skirt often being torn by bullets. Armed with pistols for her protection and saddlebags filled with medical supplies, Etheridge frequently rode into the front lines on horseback to aid wounded soldiers. Etheridge embodied the ideal daughter of the Union, much unlike her husband. She was "brave, constant, tender possessed nerves of steel, and willing to join the fight as necessary, encourage[d] the men to greater valor, or remain[ed] in the rear treating wounds." Etheridge was repeatedly exposed to the same hardships as the soldiers she treated, such as sleeping on the ground in camp. The death of her father gave her the longing to save every soldier.

Various accounts locate Etheridge at notable battles, such as the First Bull Run, Williamsburg, Second Bull Run, Antietam, Fredericksburg, and Gettysburg. Etheridge was in every battle of the Army of the Potomac except the Battle of South Mountain. At the Battle of Chancellorsville on the morning of May 3, 1863, Etheridge rode up to a general and his staff with a sack of hardtack and a dozen canteens filled with hot coffee. The men tried to get her to leave but she insisted on remaining until each of the officers ate and drank. During the time she waited, three horses were hit by Confederate solid shot. Yet, as a nearby soldier wrote, "she never flinched or betrayed the slightest emotion of fear". Later, she appeared at a Union artillery battery that had taken serious casualties in men, horses, and equipment. The artillerists were considering leaving the guns, but she talked them out of it, offering the soldiers encouragement. The gunners cheered, insisted that she leave, and returned to their duties. One soldier noted "that brave little sergeant in petticoats" bucked up their morale more than any officer could have done.

In 1864, all women were ordered out of camp as a result of an order from General Ulysses S. Grant. As a testimony to Etheridge's admirable service, numerous officers signed a petition addressed to General Grant to allow Etheridge to remain in service on the field, but it was denied. "Gentle Annie" then worked for the Hospital Transport Service, a subcommittee of the U.S. Sanitary Commission. Assigned to the Knickerbocker, under Amy M. Bradley, she aided in the transportation of wounded men from the ports of Alexandria, Virginia, to Philadelphia, New York City, and Washington. For her work and courage, she received the Kearny Cross.

== After the war ==
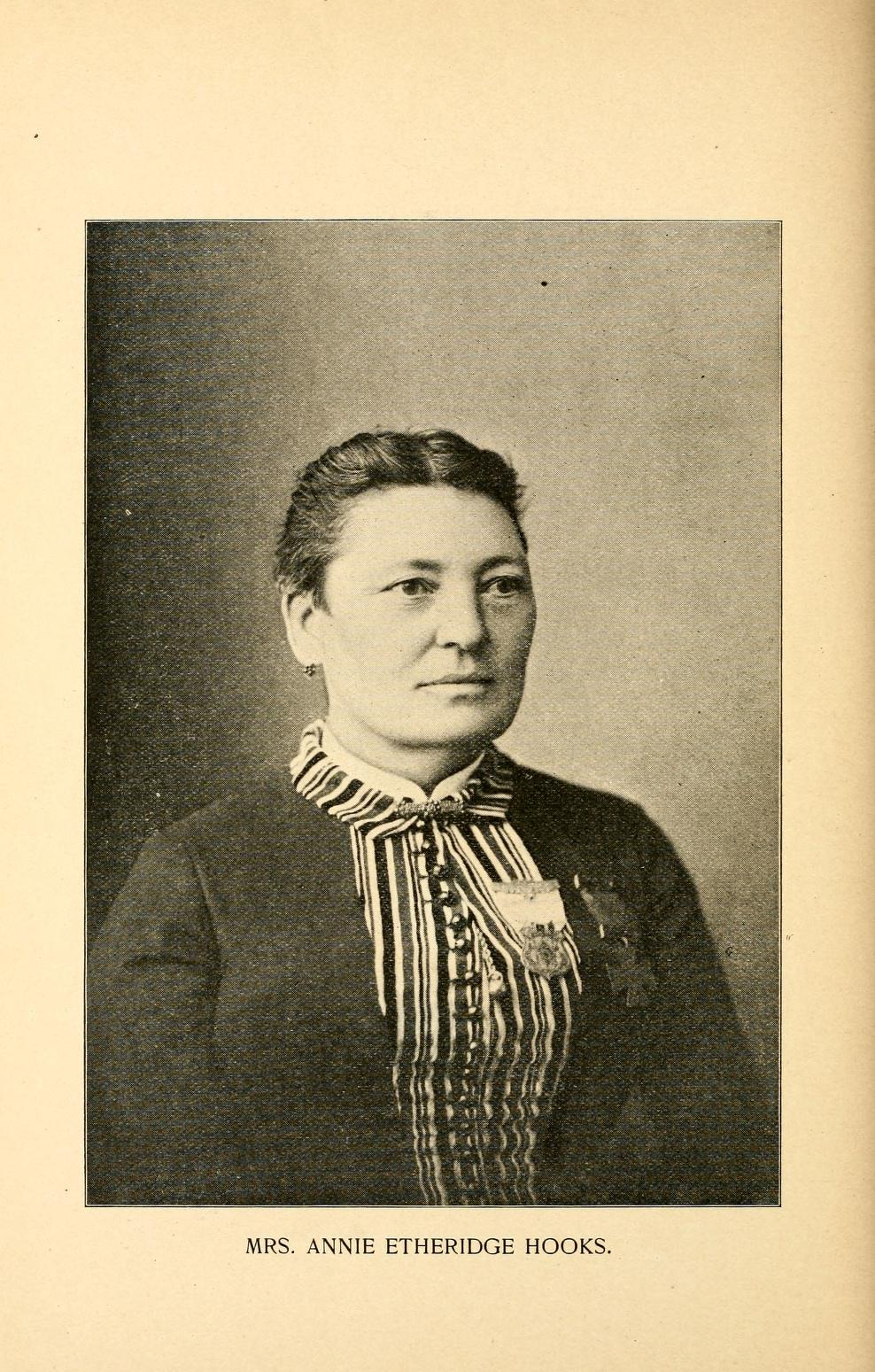
Annie Etheridge Hooks, from an 1897 publication

Etheridge's service ended with the Fifth Michigan in Detroit on July 1, 1865. Like so many women who served, Etheridge was never paid for her service. After the war, she married Civil War veteran Charles Hooks and worked in the United States Treasury Department, eventually receiving a monthly pension of $25 for her unpaid military service, notwithstanding her Sgt's pay during the war Etheridge was honored with the Kearny Cross for her bravery in service. She died January 23, 1913, and was buried with veteran's honors in Arlington National Cemetery.

== Legacy ==
Gentle Annie: The True Story of a Civil War Nurse, written by Mary Francis Shura, is a fictionalized biography of Anna Etheridge.
