= List of American Civil War generals =

The list of American Civil War (Civil War) generals has been divided into five articles: an introduction on this page, a list of Union Army generals, a list of Union brevet generals, a list of Confederate Army generals and a list of prominent acting Confederate States Army generals, which includes officers appointed to duty by E. Kirby Smith, officers whose appointments were never confirmed or completed and State militia generals who were in combat or otherwise on active duty.

The American Civil War (April 1861 – May 1865) pitted the forces of the northern "Union" or "Free" states against those of the southern "Confederate states". Long simmering sectional antagonisms and differences were brought to a head by the election of Abraham Lincoln as President of the United States in November 1860 and led to the Civil War. These centered on the possible abolition of slavery but included competing understandings of federalism, party politics, expansionism, sectionalism, tariffs, economics, values, and social structures

A longer than usual introduction is desirable for these lists because a description of the leadership of the small pre-Civil War U.S. Army and what became of those leaders not only shows that many inexperienced men had to become Civil War generals, but that more men with some military training and experience were available than may be commonly believed. The identification as generals of some officers who served in the Civil War armies is disputed and controversial, as some generals or groups of generals have some background or service details in common.

== Identification of American Civil War generals ==
Since historians dispute exactly who should be counted as Union or Confederate generals during the American Civil War (Civil War), some officers identified as generals in some past writings may not meet the criteria for identification as full-grade (or substantive-grade, or actual grade or "rank") generals. Many estimates of the number of substantive generals of actual grade, or "rank," are within about 10 names of each other. A recent compilation by John and David Eicher show most historians who have studied the number have concluded that between 554 and 564 substantive-grade Union generals and between 398 and 401 substantive-grade Confederate generals were properly appointed, confirmed, accepted appointment and served as general officers. Historians' use of different lists or criteria for inclusion as generals can add names to these totals. The inclusion of entire other categories of "generals," such as those who acted as generals but did not receive appointments, state militia generals, Union brevet generals and even some others, can add more names to the lists.

The lists in these articles contain the names and highest grades (or ranks) of the substantive or full or actual general officers of both armies and a few other notable high military commanders. The Union generals' list currently contains or is in the process of adding the actual grade and brevet grade of prominent Union officers who were awarded brevet general grade but not appointed as full substantive grade generals. Some names of others whose claims or identifications to general officer grade have often been accepted by historians and compilers of generals' lists are also included in the lists. Notes that identify officers who did not strictly meet the criteria for appointment and confirmation as generals or inclusion in the lists, even though they have been widely identified as generals, are noted in the lists.

In the early 20th century, the United States War Department prepared and Congressional committees published two memoranda which list the full rank substantive Confederate generals and the full rank substantive Union generals and the brevet rank Union generals, their grades and dates of appointment. These lists and the accompanying information were almost certainly compiled by former Confederate General Marcus J. Wright, who had been engaged to collect Confederate records in particular. Although they are unsigned, they are often referred to as his work because it was known he had been engaged in the task and he included the lists in books he wrote at about the same time. These memos showed 425 actual, substantive generals of various grades or levels were duly appointed by the President of the Confederate States Jefferson Davis and confirmed by the Confederate Senate for the Confederate Army and 583 actual, substantive generals of various grades or levels were appointed by President of the United States Abraham Lincoln and confirmed by the United States Senate for the Union Army during the course of the American Civil War. Most historians, such as the Eichers, believe these numbers should be reduced by about 25 names each to account for canceled appointments and unconfirmed nominations. The problems with the appointment or confirmation of these officers are even noted on General Wright's lists, but he still included them as general officers. Warner followed Wright's list even though some of the officers did not meet his criteria, as the Eichers noted. More significant disparities exist concerning the number of militia generals and "might have beens" who various historians also think should, or perhaps should not, be counted or recognized in some manner as Civil War generals for various reasons, including especially exercise of general officer responsibilities for some period of time.

=== Actual full rank generals required Presidential appointment, Senate confirmation ===
==== Union Army ====
A general officer of the Union Army, whether of the United States Regular Army or United States Volunteers, and whether of full or brevet grade (or rank), could legally be promoted to a grade of the general officer only by appointment by the President of the United States and confirmation by the United States Senate. Field promotions, the exercise of command duties, or brevet grade promotions alone were insufficient to qualify an officer as an actual, substantive grade general.

==== Confederate Army ====
Similar to the procedures of the US, in the Confederate States of America ("CSA") an officer could legally be made a Confederate general only by appointment by the President of the Confederate States and confirmation by the Confederate States Senate. Officers holding rank on the date of enactment of the first Confederate law on the subject of appointment of general officers, May 21, 1861, were permitted to keep those ranks. And at the end of the war, several appointments to the rank were not brought before the Confederate States Senate for confirmation. A complicating factor for the Confederate Armies, was their reliance on, and organization around, standing State Militias. A senior officer might hold the rank of general in his state militia, as a separate matter from any prior rank. In most states, the rank of general at the level of a state militia was conferred by the State's Governor. Some of those state appointments predated the start of the Civil War and some occurred after. Not all the State Militia appointments to the rank of general were translated into the same rank at the level of the Confederacy. As a result, while the Union and Confederate rules for the rank of general were similar, the CSA experienced a greater diversity at this rank in practice. As noted, while General Wright, Ezra J. Warner and other historians profess to use these criteria to identify Civil War generals, in fact they have inconsistently included about 25 names of officers for each army who do not actually meet the criteria and it is now difficult not to take note of at least these extra officers in lists of Civil War generals.

=== Identification of general officers in Civil War service ===
Although the Eichers take a stricter view of which Civil War officers should be considered full grade generals, Ezra J. Warner and other historians have accepted the individuals shown in the (General Wright) War Department memos as the officers who should be included in lists of actual Civil War generals. Thus, although 22 Union officers and 5 Confederate officers had their appointments canceled and 1 Union officer and 3 Confederate officers declined appointment to the grade of brigadier general, General Wright included them and Mr. Warner decided to accept them as full grade generals. Warner based his conclusion on the actual appointment of almost all of them, the confirmation of some of them, political considerations which may have led to the cancellations or failure of confirmations and because they seem to have exercised command. These commands were exercised mostly for longer periods of time than the periods of time which those officers who exercised such commands on a temporary or emergency basis usually acted and who usually were not appointed or nominated as general officers by the respective presidents at all. This conclusion is still inconsistent with the criteria that these authors state they are using, but at least they have given a plausible rationale for adopting Wright's full list. In doing so, they have often identified officers who were not full generals but who are notable and may deserve recognition for their actions in high commands. A few other officers in both armies who received only temporary general officer appointments or who had been killed in action or mortally wounded before they could be advised that their appointments as generals had been confirmed are also on these lists. They are perhaps the most understandable of the exceptions.

The Union Army was supported in the field by very few state militia generals who had not been taken into the United States Volunteers, the main body of the Union Army, along with their state regiments or were not promptly added to the federal service when it appeared they would exercise active field command. Historians have recognized a number of Confederate officers who exercised high command but were never formally appointed as generals. The Union Army also had at least a few officers assigned to command or temporarily placed in command of units whose generals had been killed, wounded or become unavailable, but who did not receive full rank appointments, just as the Confederate Army had.

In addition, Warner, depending on Wright, writes that 1,367 Union officers who were not promoted to full grade substantive general were awarded brevet general officer rank. Many other compilations of such brevet generals are within 10 of this number. Most of the brevet ranks were awarded posthumously or to rank from dates near the end of the war and many of them were not confirmed until 1866 or later. By the time of the Civil War, these brevet appointments were honorary titles, much like medals or commendations, and had little effect on command positions or status, especially since most of the awards were not confirmed until months or even years after the war was over, regardless of the date from which the awarded brevet grade was to rank. Even if significant numbers of brevet grade appointments had been awarded earlier in the war, except in a few special instances (sitting on court martial panels, special assignments, command of different units operating together with commanding officers of equal rank), they had not extra responsibilities, privileges or pay and would have meant little more than the award of a medal. Although most of the brevet awards were for faithful or meritorious or distinguished service, some were for more extraordinary acts of gallantry.

Although the number of Confederate generals may not be swollen by the possible addition of well over 1,300 brevet generals whose actual rank was below brigadier general as the Union general list could be, as many as 159 "might have beens" and 226 militia officers have been identified or considered by some authors as Confederate generals of some sort. Ten officers who were assigned to duty by General Edmund Kirby Smith in the Trans-Mississippi Department after communications were cut off or severely slowed down by Union forces securing control of the Mississippi River are among the "might have beens." Warner and the Eichers both warn that some false or mistaken claimants emerged over the years and that unintentional though nonetheless mistaken Civil War general officer identifications have been made and published over the years.

=== Grades or levels of general in the Union and Confederate Armies ===
Until Ulysses S. Grant was appointed lieutenant general and General-in-Chief in 1864, the Union Army had only two grades of general: major general and brigadier general. In the Union Army, major generals commanded armies as well as corps and divisions, the armies’ largest units. Seniority was determined by the date of rank stated in the Senate's confirmation resolution, which could have been a date earlier than the confirmation date. Otherwise, rank would be determined by the order of names on the lists of multiple officers confirmed in the same resolution on the same date to rank from the same date.

The Confederate Army had four grades (or levels or "ranks") of general officers, much like the modern U.S. Army: general, lieutenant general, major general and brigadier general. In theory, full generals commanded armies, lieutenant generals commanded corps, major generals commanded divisions and brigadier generals commanded brigades. Lower ranking officers might temporarily command a unit designated for a higher ranked commanding officer when the unit's commander was killed, wounded or unavailable. Some small Confederate armies of about corps size were formed and were commanded by lieutenant generals.

The Confederate Regular Army did not proceed beyond the planning stage and the appointment of six brigadier generals and a few lower grade officers. Since the Provisional Army, Confederate States (PACS) was the only Confederate Army that was organized by the Confederacy, the Confederate Army and the PACS were identical. Additional reference and distinction between a regular Confederate Army and the PACS is superfluous except perhaps as a minor historical footnote.

=== Active duty U.S. Army officers and military school graduates in Civil War armies ===
Due to the pre-Civil War U.S. Army system of promoting officers based strictly upon seniority, the general officers, chief staff officers and full colonels of the small pre-Civil War army were not only few in number but were almost all of advanced age (over half were in their seventies). Among the top field officers, 11 of the 19 colonels of the line had fought in the War of 1812 as commissioned officers. The following tables show the general officers and top staff officers of the U.S. Army in early 1861 and their ages, lengths of service in grade, whether they adhered to the Union or Confederacy and in many cases who their successors were.

==== Line officers ====
Name	Date of birth	Actual rank	Appointment date	Brevet rank	Appointment date	Allegiance	Notes
John Garland	November 15, 1793	Colonel 8th U.S. Infantry	May 7, 1849	Brevet Brigadier General	August 20, 1847	U.S.A.	Died June 5, 1861, succeeded as colonel of the regiment by Colonel Pitcairn Morrison, who retired October 20, 1863.
William S. Harney	August 27, 1800	Brigadier General	June 14, 1858			U.S.A.	Relieved of duty June 1, 1861 after signing pact with Confederate General Sterling Price not to act against pro-secessionist Missouri State Guard if that unit would not act against federal authority. Retired August 1, 1863.
Albert S. Johnston	February 2, 1803	Colonel	May 1855	Brevet Brigadier General	November 18, 1857	C.S.A.	Appointed full General in Confederate Army, August 30, 1861, to date from May 30, 1861. Given command of western theater operations. Killed in action at the Battle of Shiloh, April 6, 1862.
Winfield Scott	June 13, 1786	Major General	June 25, 1841	Brevet Lieutenant General	March 29, 1847	U.S.A	Distinguished veteran of the War of 1812 and Mexican War. General-in-Chief (Commanding General) of the U.S. Army since 1841. General-in-Chief, brevet lieutenant general and major general until retired, November 1, 1861.
Edwin V. Sumner	January 30, 1797	Brigadier General	March 16, 1861			U.S.A.	Appointed brigadier general in lieu of David E. Twiggs when Twiggs was dismissed for siding with the Confederacy. Promoted to major general of U.S. Volunteers, May 5, 1862. Oldest general to serve as an active corps commander. Died March 21, 1863.
David E. Twiggs	February 14, 1790	Brigadier General	June 30, 1846	Brevet Major General	September 23, 1846	C.S.A.	Surrendered men, property and equipment in Texas to Confederates, February 18, 1861. Dismissed March 1, 1861. Appointed major general in Confederate Army, May 22, 1861. Retired October 18, 1861. Died July 1862.
John E. Wool	February 20, 1784	Brigadier General	June 25, 1841	Brevet Major General	February 23, 1847	U.S.A.	Promoted to major general in the Regular Army of the United States, May 17, 1862. Preserved Fort Monroe on the Virginia Peninsula at Hampton Roads in Union hands. Retired August 1, 1863. Oldest officer to serve in the American Civil War.

==== Staff officers ====
Name	Date of birth	Actual rank	Appointment date	Brevet rank	Appointment date	Allegiance	Notes
Timothy Andrews	c. 1794	Lieutenant Colonel; Deputy Paymaster General		Brevet Brigadier General	September 13, 1847	U.S.A.	Continued in position until succeeded Benjamin Larned as colonel and Paymaster General, September 6, 1862. Retired November 29, 1864.
Sylvester Churchill	August 2, 1783	Colonel; Senior Inspector General	June 15, 1841	Brevet Brigadier General	February 23, 1847	U.S.A.	Continued as colonel and senior Inspector General after Mexican–American War. Retired September 25, 1861. Colonel Randolph B. Marcy was appointed senior colonel and titular head of the Inspector General's Department on August 9, 1861.
Samuel Cooper	June 12, 1798	Colonel; Adjutant General	1852			C.S.A.	Appointed brigadier general, Adjutant and Inspector General of the Confederate Army, March 16, 1861. Appointed full general and ranking general of the Confederate Army, August 31, 1861, to rank from May 16, 1861. Never in field command. Replaced by Colonel Lorenzo Thomas, born in 1804, who was promoted to brigadier general on August 3, 1861.
Henry Knox Craig	March 7, 1791	Colonel; Chief of Ordnance Department	1851			U.S.A.	Replaced by Lt. Colonel James Wolfe Ripley, born December 10, 1794, promoted to colonel on April 23, 1861. Ripley was promoted to brigadier general on August 3, 1861. Craig remained on duty as an advisor and retired June 1, 1863. Brigadier General George D. Ramsay replaced Ripley, September 15, 1863.
George Gibson	c. 1790	Colonel; Commissary General	1818	Brevet Major General	May 30, 1847	U.S.A.	Continued as colonel and Commissary General but died in mid-1861. Lt. Colonel Joseph Pannell Taylor was promoted to commissary general of subsistence with the rank of colonel on September 29, 1861, and brigadier general in the Regular Army on February 9, 1863; died June 29, 1864.
Joseph E. Johnston	February 3, 1807	Brigadier General; Quartermaster General	June 28, 1860			C.S.A.	Appointed full general in the Confederate Army, August 31, 1861. Led major Confederate commands except July 17, 1864 to February 1865. Replaced as Quartermaster General (Union) on May 15, 1861, by Brigadier General Montgomery C. Meigs.
Joseph K. F. Mansfield	December 22, 1803	Colonel; Inspector General	1853			U.S.A.	Sylvester Churchill remained senior inspector general. Commanded Department of Washington, April 27-August 17, 1861. Appointed brigadier general in the regular army, May 18, 1861, confirmed August 3, 1861. Various line commands, then command of XII Corps (Union Army), Army of the Potomac, September 15, 1862, mortally wounded at Antietam, September 17, 1862, died September 18.
Benjamin Larned	September 6, 1794	Colonel; Paymaster General	1854			U.S.A.	Relieved of duty July 12, 1862 due to ill health. Replaced by deputy paymaster, Lt. Colonel and Brevet Brigadier General Timothy Andrews.
Thomas Lawson	August 29, 1789	Colonel; Surgeon General	1836	Brevet Brigadier General	May 20, 1848	U.S.A.	Died May 15, 1861. Replaced by Colonel Clement Finley, who was born c. 1797, and retired April 14, 1862.
Joseph G. Totten	April 17, 1788	Colonel; Chief Engineer	December 7, 1838	Brevet Brigadier General	March 29, 1847	U.S.A.	Colonel and chief engineer at start of the war. Promoted to brigadier general in the Regular Army of the United States, March 3, 1863. Died April 22, 1864. He was succeeded by Brigadier General Richard Delafield.

In addition, an act of Congress of March 2, 1849 authorized the President to appoint a suitable person as Judge Advocate of the army, to be taken from the captains of the army. Captain John F. Lee of the Ordnance Department was accordingly appointed, and held the office until it was superseded by the legislation of 1862.

With few active officers to fill many commands, the two Civil War armies had to look to other persons for military leadership. Lower ranking U.S. Army officers, Mexican–American War veterans and military school graduates in civilian life would fill many top and field grade officer positions. Many positions were also filled by foreign emigres, some of whom had military training, and politicians and other civilians with no military training. Some became good generals but many others were poor commanders.

At the outbreak of the Civil War, 296 U.S. Army officers of various grades resigned. Of these, 239 joined the Confederate Army in 1861 and 31 joined after 1861. Of these Confederate officers from the U.S. Army, 184 were United States Military Academy graduates. The other active U.S. Army 809 officers, 640 of whom were West Point graduates, remained with the Union. Of the approximately 900 West Point graduates in civilian life at the beginning of the war, 114 returned to the Union Army and 99 joined the Confederate Army. Norwich University in Northfield, Vermont furnished more officers to the war than any other military school except the United States Military Academy and Virginia Military Institute. The school contributed 523 officers to the Union Army and 34 to the Confederate Army. Norwich was the only military college in the Northern states, other than West Point, which had a sizable number of military trained alumni who could provide a significant number of officers to the Union Army.

Of the 1,902 men who had ever attended Virginia Military Institute in Lexington, Virginia, 1,781 fought for the Confederacy. One-third of the field officers of Virginia regiments in 1861 were V.M.I. graduates. The Citadel, The Military College of South Carolina provided at least 6 general officers to the Confederate Army as well as 49 field grade officers, and 120 company grade officers. Another alumnus of The Citadel, Colonel Charles C. Tew, was killed on the eve of his promotion to brigadier general.

=== Generals in the lists ===
The lists of Union and Confederate general show the 583 Union Army generals and the 425 Confederate Army generals included in the Wright War Department memos and Mr. Warner's books at their highest grades achieved during the course of the war. Using these sources results in the inclusion of about 25 "might have beens" in both armies. These should be among the most prominent officers in this category and not near the number of "might have beens" identified by the Eichers. Notes should identify most, if not all, of those who are in this category. The lists thus include the 554 to 564 Union generals and 398 to 401 Confederate generals identified as actual, substantive generals by most historians, including the Eichers, and at least some of the others who might appear on other lists or in Civil War writings as generals. A few notable militia generals and some of the notable brevet general officers have been added, at least in the current absence of a separate list of Union brevet general officers. A few additional Confederate militia or acting generals or 'might have beens" are also currently added to the Confederate general list in a separate section at the end of that list. Most of the generals' names in both lists are linked to Wikipedia articles on them. Articles on the others (shown in red links because there are no existing articles about those officers) are planned.

== See also ==
- General officers in the Confederate States Army
- General officers in the United States
