= Benjamin Brice =

Benjamin W. Brice
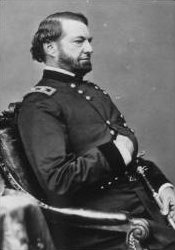
- Maj. Gen. Benjamin Brice, 1863
- Born: November 30, 1809; Harrison County, Virginia, U.S.
- Died: December 4, 1892 (aged 83); Washington, D.C., U.S.
- Burial place: United States Soldiers' and Airmen's Home National Cemetery, Washington, D.C.
- Military career
- Allegiance: United States of America; Union
- Branch: United States Army; Union Army
- Service years: 1829-1832; 1847-1849; 1852-1872
- Rank: Brigadier General; Brevet Major General
- Unit: 3rd U.S. Infantry
- Commands: Paymaster General of the U.S. Army
- Conflicts: Black Hawk War; Mexican-American War; American Civil War

Benjamin William Brice (November 30, 1809 – December 4, 1892) was a lawyer and soldier who served in the United States Army during the Black Hawk War and Mexican-American War. Later employed as the Paymaster General of the Union Army during the American Civil War and reconstruction era, Brice had on his retirement in 1872 risen to the rank of brevet major general.

== Early life and background ==
Brice was born in what is now Harrison County, West Virginia. In 1825, he entered the United States Military Academy at West Point, New York, in 1825. His classmates included future civil war generals Robert Anderson, Daniel S. Donelson, Benjamin Huger, William R. Montgomery, and Charles F. Smith. He graduated near the bottom of his class, ranking fortieth out of forty six cadets. Upon graduation he was commissioned as a second lieutenant and served with the 3rd U.S. Infantry Regiment on frontier duty at Jefferson Barracks, Missouri. He served during the Black Hawk War expedition against the Sac Indians in 1831.

Brice left the Army in 1832 and moved to Ohio. He passed the bar exam, began to practice law, and in 1846 was elected an associate judge of the court of Licking County, Ohio. Later in 1846, Brice was appointed Adjutant General of the state militia by Governor William Bebb and served until 1847, when he resigned to re-enter the army to serve in the Mexican War. Brice became United States Army Paymaster under President James K. Polk at the rank of major and served from March 3, 1847, to March 4, 1849. He saw service at Camargo in 1847, Monterrey, Saltillo, and Brazos Island in 1848, and was then stationed at Fort Brown, Texas, from 1848 to 1849.

After the war with Mexico, Brice's command was disbanded. He was reappointed a Major in 1852, and saw service in the Pay Department at Fort Fillmore, New Mexico from 1852 to 1854; New Orleans, Louisiana, from 1854 to 1856; Paymaster of the Southern District of New Mexico, headquartered at Fort Bliss, Texas, from 1856 to 1859; as well as special service in Florida in 1859. He was made Paymaster of the Western Department under General David Hunter at Fort Leavenworth, Missouri in 1859 and served until the beginning of the Civil War.

== Civil War ==
At the outbreak of the rebellion, he became Paymaster General of the District of Kansas and the Territories. In 1862, he became chief of the pay district embracing New Jersey, Pennsylvania, Maryland, and Delaware, headquartered at Baltimore, Maryland, and served until 1864. On March 22, 1862, he was promoted to brigadier general, but the promotion was tabled by Congress on July 16, 1862, and Brice reverted to his regular army rank of major. On November 29, 1864, he was called to Washington on to take command of the Pay Department.

According to all reports and diaries, the paymaster's department was grossly inefficient at the beginning of the war in 1861. Col. Benjamin F. Larned was paymaster at the beginning of the war and had served since July 1854. He died September 6, 1862, and was succeeded by Col. Timothy P. Andrews, who served to November 29, 1864. After the death of Colonel Larned, there was considerable pressure for a complete investigation of the problems in the pay department.

In 1863, the War Department finally began to check the suitability of deputy paymasters with a physical examination, and tests to evaluate mental and moral fitness. Most paymasters in the field were political appointees and those looking for a safer job away from the front lines. When Brice took charge in 1864, the regulations were finally brought up to date, and officially included the examination of candidates. This took the form of writing a business letter, solving mathematical problems, and knowledge of accounting and pay systems.

The statistics of the Pay Department show that during it disbursed $1,100,000,000, with discrepancies of less than one-tenth of one per cent. The overhead cost of paying the troops, including expenses, defalcations and losses of all kinds, was just three-fourths of one per cent of the amount disbursed. General Brice reflected on the massive endeavor of creating a modernized pay department from scratch in 1865:

No similar work of like magnitude, regarding its immensity both as to men and money and the small limit of time in which it has been performed, has, if is believed, any parallel in the history of armies... No system can be devised which, equal to the present one, can be made to combine the advantages of prompt payment, the safety of the public money, and an accurate and prompt accountability, with the least possible liability to embezzlement or corrupt defalcation."

— Maj. Gen. Benjamin W. Brice

Brice was part of a group of Washington staff officers during the Civil War, a period that saw relatively low turnover among such positions. While President Abraham Lincoln created a cabinet that included several of his political rivals, Ulysses S. Grant reorganized the staff departments and appointed officers, including Brice.

On December 12, 1864, President Lincoln nominated Brice for appointment to the grade of brevet brigadier general in the regular army, to rank from December 2, 1864, and the United States Senate confirmed the appointment on February 20, 1865. On March 8, 1866, President Andrew Johnson nominated Brice for appointment to the grade of brevet major general in the regular army, to rank from December 2, 1864, and the United States Senate initially confirmed the appointment on May 4, 1866, recalled May 10, 1866 for possible adjustment of the date of rank by the President so brevet field officers could have precedence over brevet staff officers, reconfirmed July 14, 1866.

== Postwar career ==
In 1866, Brice was promoted to brigadier general in the regular army during the reorganization of the staff corps. Brice's position as paymaster was often used for political leverage. In 1867, General Grant had the pay of Col. Gordon Granger suspended because of an unauthorized absence. Granger and Grant had been adversaries since the beginning of the war, and Grant hindered Granger's advancement, stating that he was "outspoken and rough in manner, kindly and sympathetic at heart ... His independence occasionally came near to insubordination, and at ordinary times he lacked energy."

Brice also officially interceded on behalf of his friend James Magoffin, a Confederate Quartermaster assigned to the far West supplying the forces of Henry H. Sibley and John W. Baylor. In the fall of 1865, Magoffin went to Washington to seek amnesty from President Andrew Johnson for his activities on behalf of the Confederacy, but was unsuccessful until Brice's intervention in 1866.

After the war, Brice remained in charge of the Pay Department in Washington D.C. until 1872, when he retired from active duty. He died in 1892 and was interred at the Soldier's Home National Cemetery in Washington. His brother in law was Bvt. Maj. Gen. William Scott Ketchum.

== See also ==
- List of American Civil War generals (Union)
- List of American Civil War brevet generals (Union)

== Notes ==
Preceded by Samuel R. Curtis	Adjutant General; Ohio; 1846-1847	Succeeded by Ormsby M. Mitchel
