= Francis S. Dodge =

US Army general and recipient of the Medal of Honor

Francis Safford Dodge
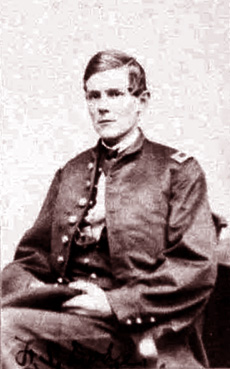
- Born: September 11, 1842; Danvers, Massachusetts, U.S.
- Died: February 19, 1908 (aged 65); Washington, D.C., U.S.
- Burial place: Arlington National Cemetery
- Spouse: Mary Hunt (m. 1878)
- Military career
- Allegiance: United States of America
- Branch: United States Army
- Service years: 1861–1906
- Rank: Brigadier General
- Commands: Paymaster General
- Conflicts: American Civil War: Battle of Roanoke Island; Battle of New Bern; Battle of White Hall; Battle of Kinston; Battle of Goldsborough Bridge; Indian Wars: White River War; Spanish–American War
- Awards: Medal of Honor

Francis Safford Dodge (September 11, 1842 – February 19, 1908) was a US Army officer with the rank of Brigadier General, who received the Medal of Honor for his actions during the Indian Wars. He also served as Paymaster General.

== Early life ==
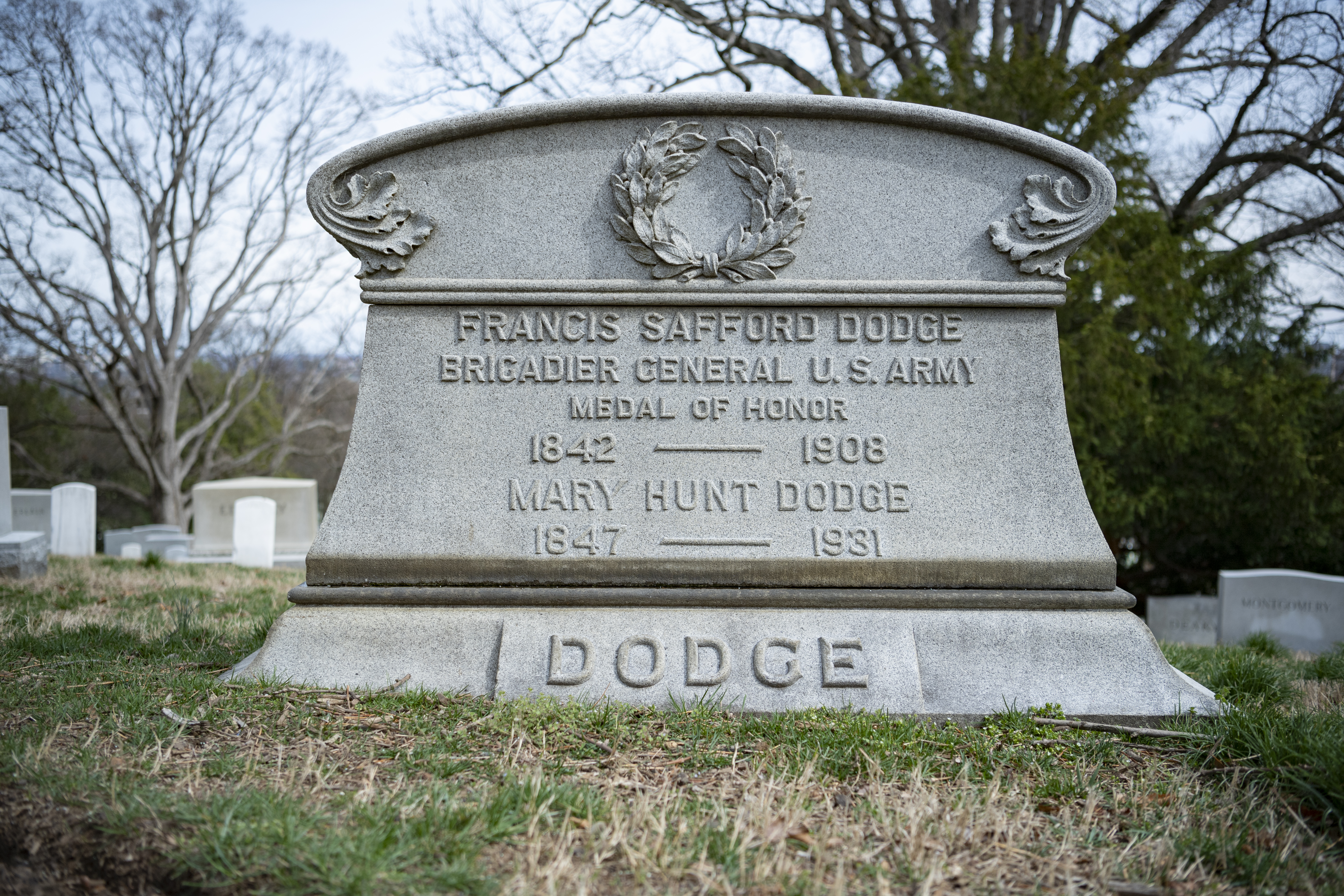
Grave at Arlington National Cemetery

The eldest child of Francis and Rebecca Dodge, Francis Safford Dodge was born on a farm in Danvers, Massachusetts. The eldest of six siblings, he graduated from Holten High School in 1862 and enlisted in the US Army on October 9, 1861, receiving his commission as a private in the 23rd Massachusetts Infantry on December 4, 1861, the unit having been commissioned by Massachusetts governor John A. Andrew on October 7.

His marriage to Mary Hunt, the daughter of William Low and Louise Weston, occurred on December 3, 1878, in Danvers. The couple had no children.

== Civil War Service ==
Dodge's new unit left for Annapolis, Maryland about a month after its commissioning on November 11, 1861. It then left shortly thereafter for what became Ambrose Burnside's expedition to North Carolina, where Dodge first saw combat action in the Battle of Roanoke Island. He then subsequently saw action in New Bern, White Hall and Kinston. Dodge was promoted to corporal sometime before accepting a commission as a second lieutenant in the 2nd USCT Cavalry Regiment on December 23, 1863, having been discharged from the enlisted ranks the day before. With his new unit, Dodge participated in the Battle of Drewry's Bluff and later participated in the siege of Petersburg. Following Petersburg, he was assigned to the staff of Brigadier General Charles J. Paine, as acting ordnance officer, remaining in that position until the end of the Civil War; in this role he saw action at Newmarket, Fort Harrison, and Fair Oaks, Virginia, as well as both Fort Fisher expeditions.

Following the war, he was assigned to the Freedmen's Bureau at Assumption Parish, Louisiana, serving through December 1865. On July 6, 1865, he was promoted to captain and then mustered out of the army by February 12, 1866, as a result of the US Army's reorganization of black soldiers into all-black segregated units.

Congress authorized the creation of six new black regiments later that year and Dodge was transferred to the 9th Cavalry Regiment as a first lieutenant in the regular army on July 28, 1866, and served in the White River War. Dodge was re-promoted to captain on July 31, 1867.

== White River War ==
Assigned to Fort Stockton which was located somewhere between San Antonio and El Paso, Texas, Dodge and his unit remained there for the better part of five years, until fall 1873. The following several years saw assignments to Fort McAvett, Fort Concho and Fort Clark, Texas; Fort Sill, Indian Territory; and Fort Union, New Mexico. 1876 and part of 1877 saw him and his unit posted at Fort Wallace in Kansas.

In July 1879, he was sent to what is now northwestern Colorado to "prevent any collusion between the settlers and Indians". These Indians were known as White River Utes and Captain Dodge and his Company D regiment were posted to Fort Garland the following month, leaving on August 4 with orders to travel to Middle Park and "remain in that place to prevent disputes between the local settlers and the native peoples." By the 19th he and his men had established a camp some ten miles below Hot Sulphur Springs, leaving on the 27th to proceed to Peck's crossing of the roads that led to Rawlins and the Indian Agency.

Two days later, following notice that resupply rations were gone, Captain Dodge and his men were headed back to Fort Garland. En route, the Indian Agency sent a communication indicating they were to head to their office to assist in the arrest of Indians. It was on this return trip that a message written by Captain Payne commanding the besieged troops near White River was delivered by a courier named Mansfield from the Indian Agency, indicating they were surrounded and had forty wounded men.

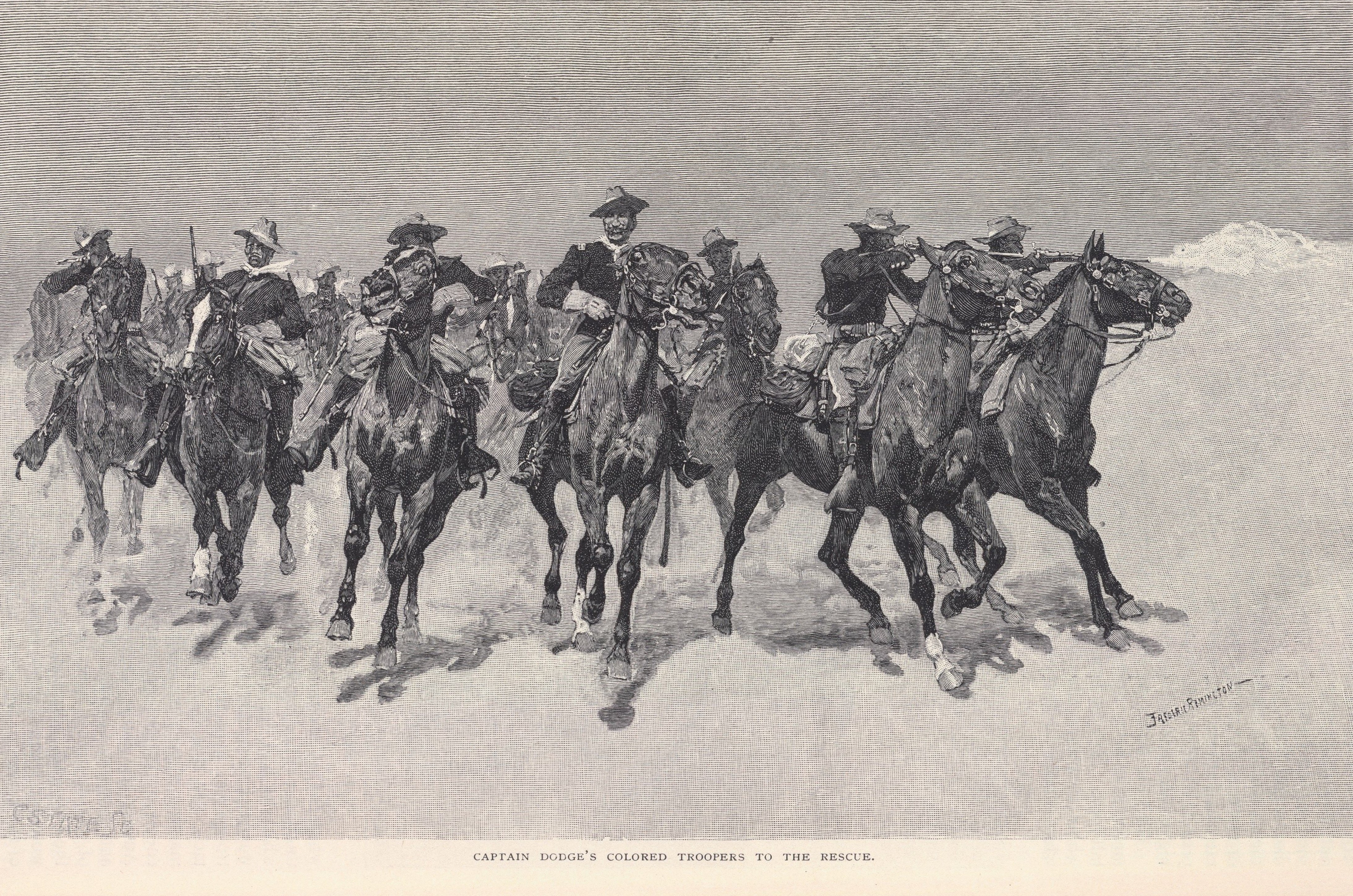
Captain Francis S. Dodge on horseback with his unit of cavalry.

Immediately, Captain Dodge and his men set out to relieve the troops at White River, traveling approximately 11 miles, pitching camp and staying briefly, then riding all night to reach the besieged men at approximately 4 am. Dodge and the men of 9th Cavalry spent the next several days holding off the Indian forces until on or around October 2, the survivors were escorted to Forts Steele and D.A. Russell by Captain Dodge and the men of the 9th Cavalry. It is these actions that resulted in Dodge being awarded the Medal of Honor.

== Spanish American War ==
Following his Indian Wars service, Dodge retired from active combat duty in 1877 and entered the army paymaster service. His appointment as a paymaster and promotion to major were effective December 20, 1879, but not confirmed by Congress until the following month. His paymaster service began in San Antonio, Texas, in May 1880, where he served in that role for six years. A four-year stay in New York City led to service as paymaster in Walla Walla, Washington, for another four years, upon which he became chief paymaster for the Department of Texas in January 1896, until the breakout of the Spanish–American War.

His Spanish-American War service included postings in Atlanta, Georgia, as chief paymaster of the Department of the Gulf, Santiago, Cuba and Puerto Rico by July 1898. During a later trip to Cuba, Dodge contracted yellow fever in August and was sick for a few days but recovered fully after returning to New York City for three months; during this period, he was assigned as chief paymaster for the Department of Colorado.

In May 1899, Dodge temporarily took over the duties of chief paymaster in Cuba following the illness of the previous paymaster. The position became permanent the next month and it was in this assignment that he served for the duration of the Spanish-American War. Residing in the Lieutenant Governor's Palace in Havana, he again contracted yellow fever in late 1900 and was the only one of the officers in the department's paymaster corps to survive it.

== Medal of Honor citation ==
Dodge was awarded the Medal of Honor for his actions during the White River War on April 2, 1898.

Rank and organization: Captain, Company D, 9th U.S. Cavalry. Place and date: Near White River Agency, Colo., September 29, 1879. Entered service at: Danvers, Mass. Birth: September 11, 1842, Danvers, Mass. Date of issue: April 2, 1898. With a force of 40 men rode all night to the relief of a command that had been defeated and was besieged by an overwhelming force of Indians, reached the field at daylight, joined in the action, and fought for three days.

== Post-military career ==
After twenty-one years at Major rank, Dodge was promoted to lieutenant colonel and became a Deputy Paymaster General in the United States Army, assigned to the Department of the East until January 1904. Later that month, on January 23rd, Dodge received two promotions to colonel and then brigadier general, with Congressional approval naming him Paymaster-General of the United States Army. He assumed his new duties the next day and remained in that post until his retirement on September 11, 1906. Dodge was succeeded by Culver C. Sniffen.

Dodge died in Washington, D.C., on February 19, 1908; his health had declined over the years since returning from his multiple yellow fever infections and was buried in Arlington National Cemetery.
