= Caleb Swan =

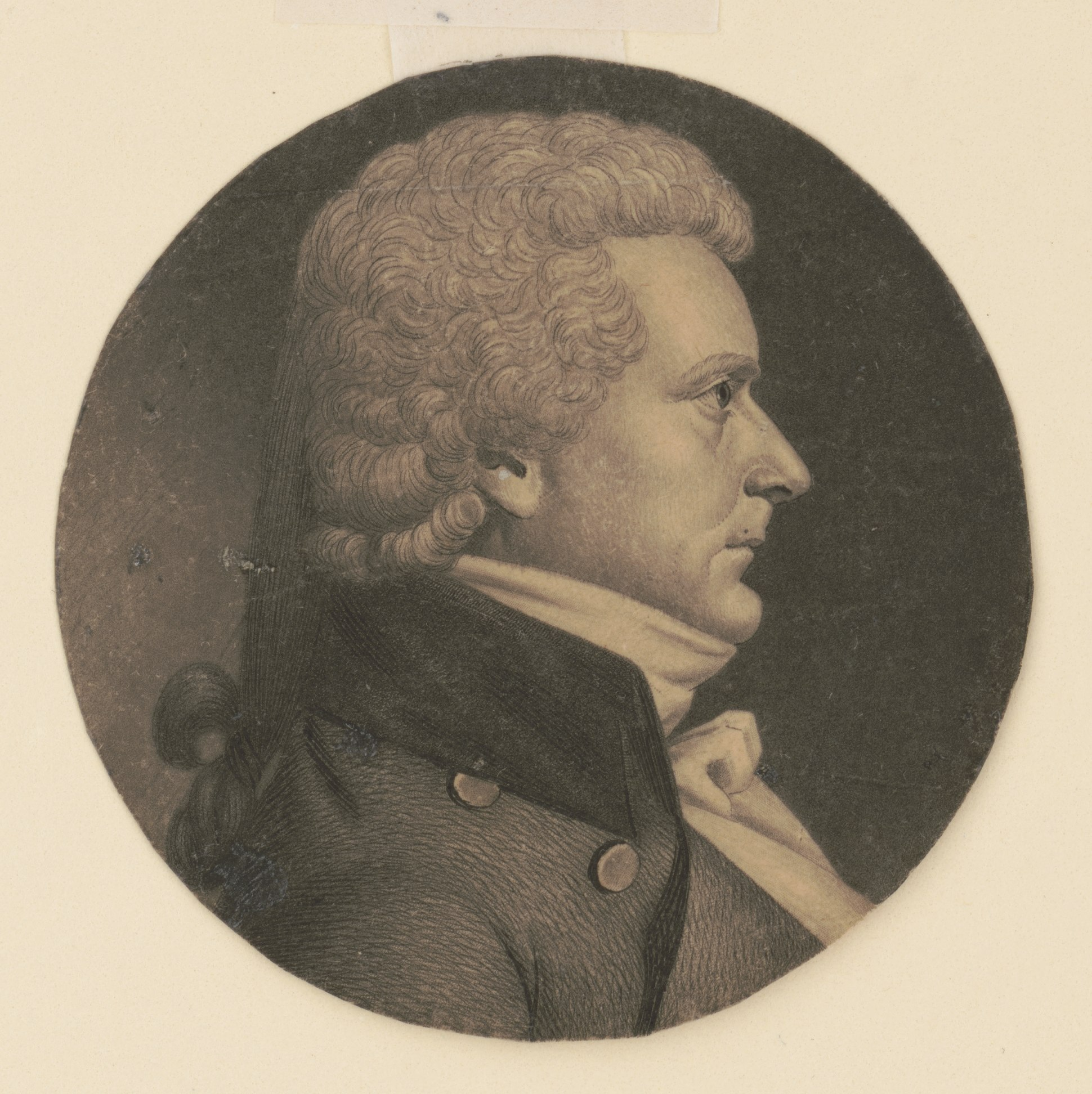
- Born: July 2, 1758; Province of Massachusetts Bay
- Died: November 29, 1809 (aged 51); Washington, D.C.
- Burial place: Arlington National Cemetery
- Military career
- Allegiance: United States
- Branch: Continental Army; United States Army
- Service years: 1779-1784, 1792-1808
- Rank: Ensign; Major, Paymaster of the Army
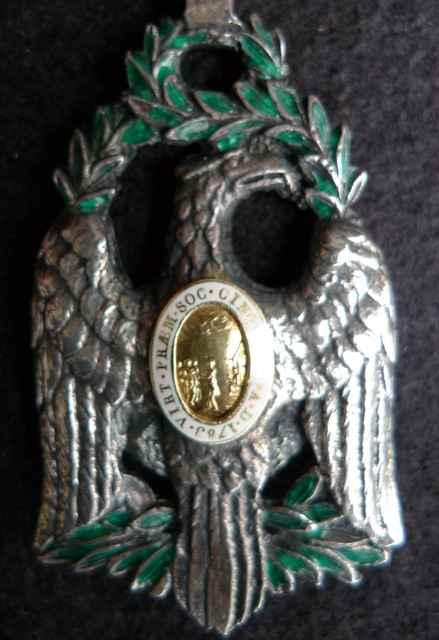
- Awards: Original member of the Society of the Cincinnati.

Caleb Swan, was born in Methuen, Province of Massachusetts Bay on July 2, 1758, but grew up in Fryeburg, Province of Massachusetts Bay; he died in Washington D.C. November 11, 1809. Swan was the fifth Paymaster-General of the United States Army, serving from May 8, 1792, to June 30, 1808. He began his military career as an officer in the Continental Army. Later he served in a civilian capacity as clerk in the War Department and Indian Agent. Swan was appointed paymaster to the Legion of the United States in 1792, and Paymaster of the Army later the same year.

== Continental Army ==
Caleb Swan was a namesake of his father, a graduate of Harvard College, and one of the pioneer settlers of Fryeburg, Maine, who had been a lieutenant in the French and Indian War. His mother was Dorothy Frye, a niece of Joseph Frye. He was commissioned ensign in the 4th Massachusetts Regiment of the Continental Army November 26, 1779, transferred to the 8th Massachusetts Regiment January 1, 1781, and to the 3rd Massachusetts Regiment June 12, 1783. Swan was retained in Jacksons Continental Regiment from November 1783 to June 20, 1784.

== Clerk and Indian agent ==
After he left the army, Swan served as clerk in the War Department pay office and from 1789 as chief clerk of the War Department. In 1790, Swan was appointed Deputy Agent to the Creek Nation and ordered by Henry Knox, the Secretary of War, to follow Alexander McGillivray and the other Creek chiefs and warriors back to their homeland after they had signed the treaty of New York. His mission was to observe the Creeks in their homeland and report to the U.S. government. (Note: The report has been published as: Swan, Caleb (1856). "Position and State of Manners and Art in the Creek or Muscogee Nation in 1791." In: Schoolcraft, Henry Rowe (ed.) Information, respecting the History, Conditions and Prospects of the Indian Tribes of the United States. Philadelphia, vol. 5, pp. 251-283. .)

== Paymaster ==
In 1792, Swan succeeded Joseph Howell Jr. as paymaster to the Legion of the United States in 1792. The pay organization of the Legion had Swan at the top as paymaster, supported by Daniel Britt, the assistant paymaster, and with a paymaster in each of the four sub-legions elected by its officers. As paymaster Swan was severely traduced due to long delays between paydays. In fact, he was a competent and diligent administrator who became a scapegoat for the inefficiency of the Army disbursing system and especially the tardiness of Congress to appropriate enough means to cover the expenses of the army in the field. Swan was loyal to General Wayne, the commander of the Legion, and he was backed by him when criticized.

On May 9, 1792, President George Washington appointed Swan paymaster of the troops of the United States, to reside with the army. As paymaster of the Army he was referred to as Major Swan; receiving $120.00 per month in pay and in addition $10.00 per month for forage and four rations per day, making a total annual compensation of $1,764.40. In 1795, Swan was a witness to the Treaty of Greenville. In spite of being a Federalist, Swan was retained by President Jefferson after the enactment of the Military Peace Establishment Act in 1802.

== Family, resignation and death ==
Swan married Maria Henrietta Abert, John James Abert's eldest sister, in 1806. He resigned from the Army, June 30, 1808 and died on November 29, 1809. Swan was originally buried in the Old Presbyterian Cemetery in Washington, D.C., but was reinterred at the Arlington National Cemetery in 1892. The widow later married W.W.P. Bryan of Philadelphia.
