= Charles Whipple =

Charles Whipple may refer to:

- Charles W. Whipple (1805–1856), American attorney, politician and judge in Michigan
- Charles H. Whipple (1849–1932), United States Army officer
