= Bates Battlefield =

- U.S. National Register of Historic Places
- Location within Wyoming Location within the United States
- Nearest city: Thermopolis, Wyoming
- Coordinates: 43°32′31″N 107°36′17″W
- Built: 1874
- NRHP reference No.: 74002286
- Added to NRHP: November 20, 1974

The Bates Battlefield was the scene of an 1874 action in which an Arapaho encampment was attacked by U.S. Army forces under Captain Alfred E. Bates. The battlefield is a narrow valley in Hot Springs County, Wyoming, near the junction of the Big Horn Mountains and the Owl Creek Mountains. Variously called the Bates Battle, the Battle of Young's Point, the Battle of Snake Mountain and the Nowood Battle, the action was part of a campaign by forces under the command of Lieutenant General Philip Sheridan to protect the comparatively sedentary Shoshone under Chief Washakie from raids by their traditional enemies, the Northern Cheyenne, the Sioux and the Northern Arapaho.

In June 1874, "Sioux, Cheyenne, and Arapaho warriors decided to attack the Wind River Shoshones. As the invaders crossed the Big Horn Mountains, they had a disagreement about the purpose of their trip. Some claimed it was a raid for murder and the spoils of war; others said it was to steal horses. Because of the disagreement, the Arapahoes refused to participate."

Sheridan ordered Bates to raid the Arapaho camp, reported to comprise between 40 and 112 lodges. On July 1, 1874, Bates set forth leading Company B, 2nd Cavalry with 63 cavalrymen, 20 white and Shoshone scouts under Lieutenant R.H. Young, and a party of 167 Shoshone under Washakie.

Bates led thirty cavalrymen and twenty Shoshone against the encampment, occupied by Black Coal's people, at daybreak on July 4. Lt. Young took his scouts around to the other end of the village. Fighting went well at first for Bates' force, but the Arapaho moved to a nearby height and began to fire down onto Bates' raiders. Bates withdrew from the village without recovering his own dead., suffering four killed and five or six wounded, while reporting 25 Arapaho killed and 100 wounded. Other reports indicate the Arapaho suffered as few as ten casualties. Bates captured 350 horses of the 1200 to 1400 head associated with the village. Bates blamed his lack of overall success on the noise made by the Shoshone. Accounts of the battle by different parties reveal wide discrepancies in perceptions of the motivation, progress, and outcome of the fight.

The Bates Battlefield was listed on the National Register of Historic Places in 1974.
