= Charles H. Whipple =

US Army officer and paymaster (1849–1932)

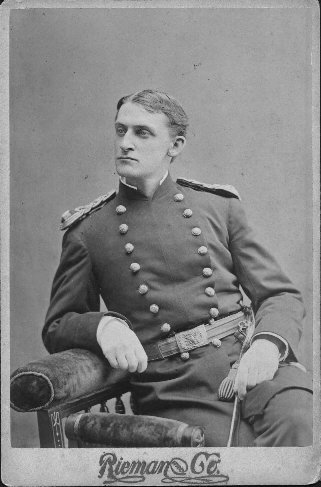
- 1881 carte-de-visite photo by Reiman & Co., Cincinnati
- Born: June 12, 1849; Adams, New York, US
- Died: November 6, 1932 (aged 83); Los Angeles, California, US
- Burial place: Forest Lawn Memorial Park, Glendale, California, US
- Spouse: Evelyn Elizabeth McLean (m. 1871–1932)
- Children: 2
- Relatives: Henry Benjamin Whipple (father); David Wager (grand-uncle); Henry Halleck (cousin); Nathaniel McLean (father-in-law)
- Military career
- Service: United States Army
- Service years: 1881‒1912
- Rank: Brigadier General
- Unit: United States Army Pay Department
- Commands: Paymaster-General of the United States Army
- Wars: American Indian Wars; Spanish–American War; Philippine–American War

Charles H. Whipple (12 June 1849 – 6 November 1932) was an officer in the United States Army. He served as a paymaster from 1881 to 1912 and was a veteran of the American Indian Wars, Spanish–American War and Philippine–American War. Whipple served as Paymaster-General of the United States Army from 1908 to 1912 and attained the rank of brigadier general.

== Early life ==
Charles Henry Whipple was born in Adams, New York on June 12, 1849, a son of Henry Benjamin Whipple and Cornelia (Wright) Whipple. He was raised and educated in Adams and in Faribault, Minnesota, where his father served as the first Episcopal bishop of Minnesota. Whipple graduated from St. Paul's School in Concord, New Hampshire, then began a banking career as a bookkeeper and assistant cashier with the Citizens' National Bank of Faribault. In March 1871, Whipple accepted a position as a paymaster with the Northern Pacific Railway. In September, he left the railroad to return to Citizens' National Bank, this time as cashier.

In February 1881, Whipple was commissioned as a major in the United States Army and appointed as a paymaster. He performed paymaster duties throughout the western United States, including postings during the American Indian Wars and assignment to Saint Paul, Minnesota from 1894 to 1898.

In May 1884, Whipple was carrying a $30,000 payroll (over $1 million in 2025) to Fort Buford with a sergeant as guard when seven masked men attempted to rob them near Glendive, Montana. The sergeant was killed and the driver of the stagecoach in which they rode was wounded, but Whipple escaped with the money and hid in some nearby brush. The robbers were not caught, but a horse dealer who had assisted them was prosecuted.

Whipple served in Cuba and Puerto Rico during the Spanish–American War, and in the Philippines during the Philippine–American War. In 1908, he succeeded Culver C. Sniffen as Paymaster-General of the United States Army and was promoted to brigadier general. Whipple served in this post for four years, and retired in 1912.

== Later life ==
In addition to membership in the Episcopal church, Whipple was a member of the Military Order of the Carabao, Society of Foreign Wars, General Society of the War of 1812, Sons of the Revolution, Sons of the American Revolution, Society of the Cincinnati, and General Society of Colonial Wars. He was also a hereditary member of the Military Order of the Loyal Legion of the United States. Whipple was active in Freemasonry; in addition to life membership in Fairibault's lodge, he also belonged to Fairibault's lodge of Royal Arch Masonry, the Washington, D.C. commandery of the Knights Templar, and Washington, D.C.'s Almas Temple of the Shriners. He was also active in the Minnesota Historical Society and the St. Paul's School Alumni Association.

In retirement, Whipple was a resident of Los Angeles, California. He died in Los Angeles on 6 November 1932. Whipple was buried at Forest Lawn Memorial Park in Glendale, California.

=== Family ===
In December 1871, Whipple married Evelyn Elizabeth McLean, a daughter of Nathaniel McLean, who served as a Union Army brigadier general during the American Civil War, and granddaughter of U.S. Supreme Court Justice John McLean. They were the parents of two sons, Charles Henry Jr. and Henry Benjamin.

Among Whipple's relatives were David Wager, his grand-uncle, and Henry Halleck, who was his first cousin once removed.

== Effective dates of promotion ==
- Major, 18 February 1881
- Lieutenant Colonel, 3 May 1901
- Colonel, 25 January 1904
- Brigadier General, 1 January 1908
- Brigadier General (Retired), 15 February 1912
