= Alfred E. Bates =

U.S. Army major general (1840–1909)

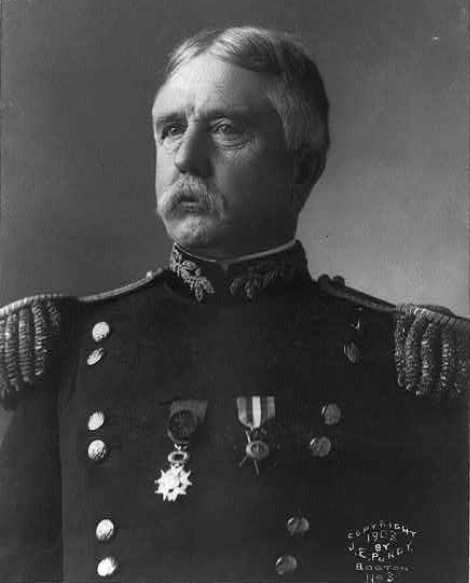
- J. E. Purdy photo, 1903. Library of Congress.
- Born: July 15, 1840; Monroe, Michigan, U.S.
- Died: October 13, 1909 (aged 69); New York City, U.S.
- Burial place: West Point Cemetery, West Point, New York
- Education: United States Military Academy (1861–1865)
- Spouse: Caroline Eliza McCorkle (m. 1875–1909, his death)
- Military career
- Allegiance: Union
- Service: Union Army (1861); United States Army (1865–1904)
- Service years: 1861, 1865–1904
- Rank: Major General
- Units: U.S. Cavalry Branch; U.S. Army Pay Department
- Commands: Chief Paymaster, Department of California; U.S. Military Attaché, London, England; U.S. Military Attaché, Paris, France; Paymaster-General of the United States Army
- Wars: American Civil War; American Indian Wars; Spanish–American War
- Awards: Legion of Honor (Officer) (France)

Alfred E. Bates (July 15, 1840 – October 13, 1909) was a career officer in the United States Army. A veteran of the American Civil War, American Indian Wars, and Spanish–American War, he attained the rank of major general and was best known for his service as Paymaster-General of the United States Army from 1899 to 1904.

A native of Monroe, Michigan, Bates attended the local schools and Canandaigua Academy in Canandaigua, New York before enlisting in the Union Army for the American Civil War. He served briefly in Company A, 4th Michigan Infantry Regiment before receiving appointment to the United States Military Academy (West Point). He graduated in 1865 and was commissioned a second lieutenant of Cavalry. Bates served on frontier duty at posts in western states including Kansas, Nebraska, and Wyoming and took part in expeditions during the American Indian Wars.

In 1875, Bates transferred to the army's U.S. Army Pay Department, and he performed paymaster duties at posts in states and territories including Texas, Dakota Territory, Montana, and Minnesota. In 1897, he was promoted to lieutenant colonel and assigned as the army's Deputy Paymaster-General. During the Spanish–American War, he was promoted to temporary brigadier general and was assigned as U.S. military attaché in London and Paris. In July 1899, he was assigned as the Paymaster-General of the United States Army. Bates served in this post with the rank of brigadier general until January 1904. He was promoted to major general on January 21 and retired on January 22, six months before attaining the mandatory retirement age of 64. He was a recipient of the Legion of Honor (Officer) from France to recognize his service as attaché in Paris.

In retirement, Bates was a resident of Washington, D.C., and was called on to perform public service including assisting the American Red Cross during its response to the 1906 San Francisco earthquake and representing the United States during Pan-American Conferences on international finance and monetary policy. He died in New York City on October 13, 1909, and was buried at West Point Cemetery.

== Early life ==
Alfred Elliott Bates was born near Monroe, Michigan, on July 15, 1840, a son of Alfred Gould Bates and Elizabeth Ann (Elliott) Bates, who was known as Ann. He attended the schools of Monroe and Canandaigua Academy in Canandaigua, New York. In May 1861, Bates enlisted in the Union Army for the American Civil War, joining Monroe's Smith Guards, which organized and trained at an encampment in Adrian, Michigan. The unit was subsequently mustered into federal service as Company A, 4th Michigan Infantry Regiment.

In September 1861, Bates was appointed to the United States Military Academy by U.S. Representative Fernando C. Beaman. He graduated in 1865 ranked 17th of 68, and received his commission as a second lieutenant of Cavalry. During his academy years, Bates was one of Elizabeth Bacon's suitors, but she married George Armstrong Custer in 1864. Among his classmates who became general officers were Charles W. Raymond, John Patten Story, George H. Burton, and Samuel Meyers Mills Jr. Among his classmates who did not become general officers was Henry B. Ledyard Jr.

== Start of career ==
Bates was initially assigned to the 2nd Cavalry Regiment, and he received promotion to first lieutenant in October 1865. He performed frontier duty with his regiment at Fort Dodge, Kansas, from November 1865 to June 1866 and Fort Wallace, Kansas, from June to September 1866. He served as the regimental quartermaster from September 1866 to May 1867, and regimental adjutant from May 1867 to January 1869. In January 1869, Bates was promoted to captain, and performed frontier and scouting duty at Fort McPherson, Nebraska until August 1869.

From August 1869 to September 1873, Bates was an instructor of Cavalry tactics at West Point. He was a member of the army's Board for Compiling Cavalry Tactics from October 1872 to June 1873. After a leave of absence, Bates was on frontier duty with his regiment at Camp Brown, Wyoming, from March 1874 to March 1875. This posting included a skirmish against the northern Arapaho on July 4, 1874, and one against the Sioux in the mountains of Sweetwater County, Wyoming, on July 13, 1874. He was promoted to major in the U.S. Army Pay Department on March 3, 1875.

== Continued career ==
After transferring to the Pay Department, Bates was a paymaster at Headquarters, Department of Texas from May 1875 to April 1880 and Fort Buford, Dakota Territory, from June to August 1880. He performed paymaster duty at Fort Keogh, Montana, in August and September 1880, and at Saint Paul, Minnesota and Fort Snelling, Minnesota from September 1880 to May 1882. He served in Washington, D.C., from June 1882 to July 1886, then was posted to Saint Paul again, this time from July 1886 to May 1890.

Bates performed paymaster duties in New York City from June 1890 to June 1894. From June 1894 to December 1896, he was chief paymaster for the Department of California in San Francisco. Bates was promoted to lieutenant colonel in January 1897 and assigned as the army's Deputy Paymaster-General.

== Later career ==
Bates joined the United States Volunteers for the Spanish–American War and was assigned as U.S. military attaché in London, where he served from March 1898 to May 1899. He was promoted to temporary brigadier general in May 1898. While serving in London, Bates was concurrently assigned as U.S. military attaché in Paris, where he served from October 1898 to May 1899. He reverted to the permanent rank of colonel in March 1899, and returned to his assignment as Deputy Paymaster-General in May.

In July 1899, Bates was promoted to permanent brigadier general and assigned as the Paymaster-General of the United States Army, succeeding Asa B. Carey, and he served until January 1904. Bates was promoted to major general on January 21, 1904, and retired on January 22, a few months before he would have reached the mandatory retirement age of 64.

== Retirement and death ==
In retirement, Bates was a resident of Washington, D.C., and maintained a summer home in Windsor, Massachusetts. In May 1906, he accepted a request from William Howard Taft, the United States Secretary of War to assist the accounting department of the American Red Cross as it provided disaster relief following the San Francisco earthquake. In 1908, Elihu Root, then serving as the United States Secretary of State, appointed Bates to represent the United States at the Pan-American Conferences, and assigned him to prepare and present a research paper on the world's currencies.

On October 9, 1909, Bates was in New York City to see off his wife as she boarded a ship bound for Europe. He had a stroke soon after she left, and was taken to a private medical facility on West 61st Street. His condition rapidly deteriorated, and he died on October 13. Bates was buried at West Point Cemetery.

== Legacy ==
In September 1898, Félix Faure, the president of France, conferred on Bates the Legion of Honor (Officer) in recognition of his service as U.S. military attaché in Paris.

There is a cenotaph to Bates at Woodland Cemetery in Monroe, Michigan.

Bates Battlefield, near Thermopolis, Wyoming, is the site where Bates led troops during an 1874 engagement against the Arapaho, and is named for him. The location was added to the National Register of Historic Places in 1974.

== Family ==
On December 1, 1875, Bates married Caroline Eliza McCorkle (1849–1919) of New York City. They were the parents of two daughters, Henrietta and Elizabeth. Caroline McCorkle's mother Caroline Morgan Waterman was the sister of Eliza Matilda Waterman, who was married to politician and banker Edwin D. Morgan. McCorkle was a favorite niece of the Morgans, and as a result she inherited a substantial portion of their wealth when they died in the mid-1880s.

== Photos ==
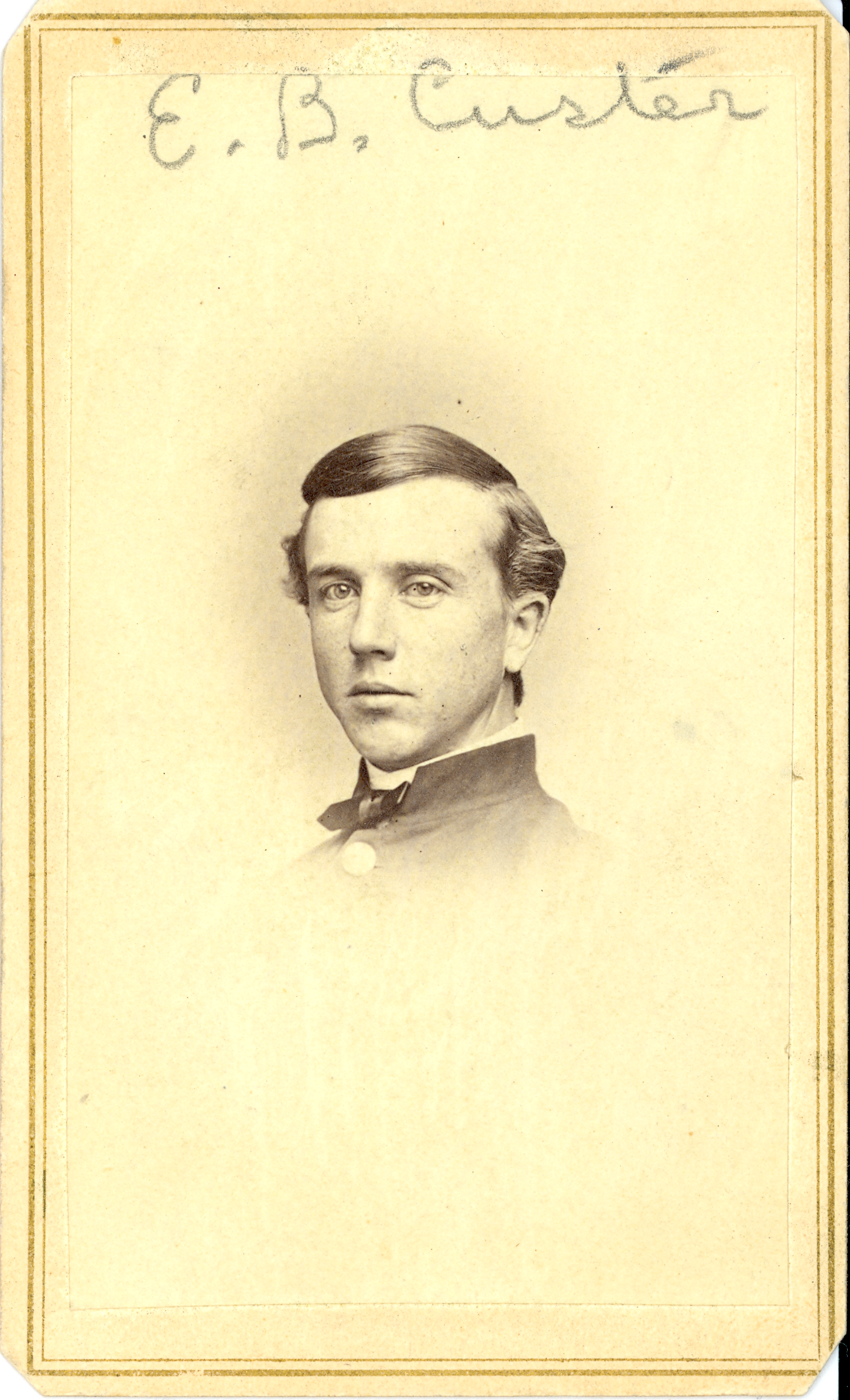
Albumen carte-de-visite photograph of Bates as a West Point cadet, addressed to Elizabeth Bacon Custer, circa 1863

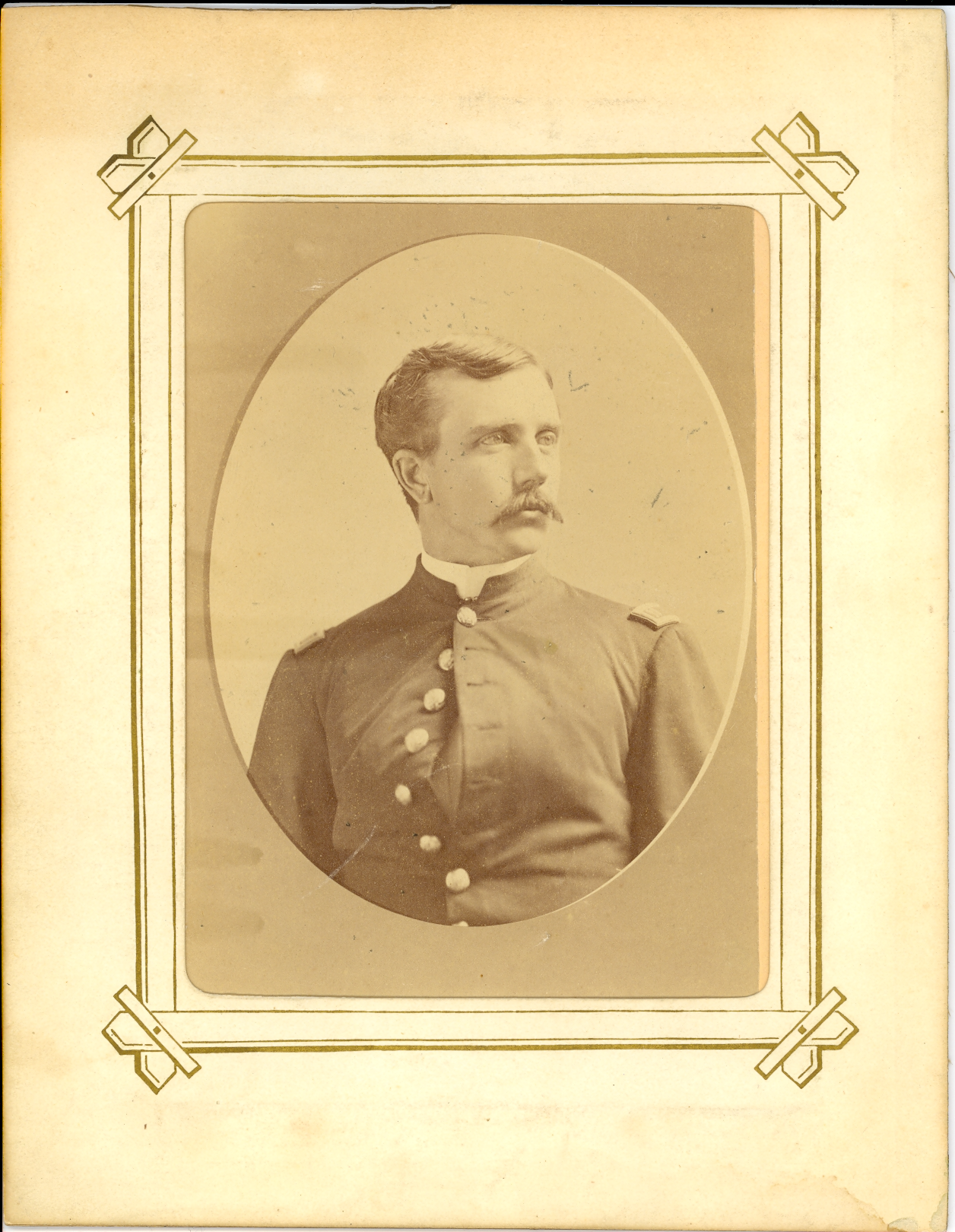
Albumen, card-mounted photograph of Bates in bust view, taken in Boston circa 1865

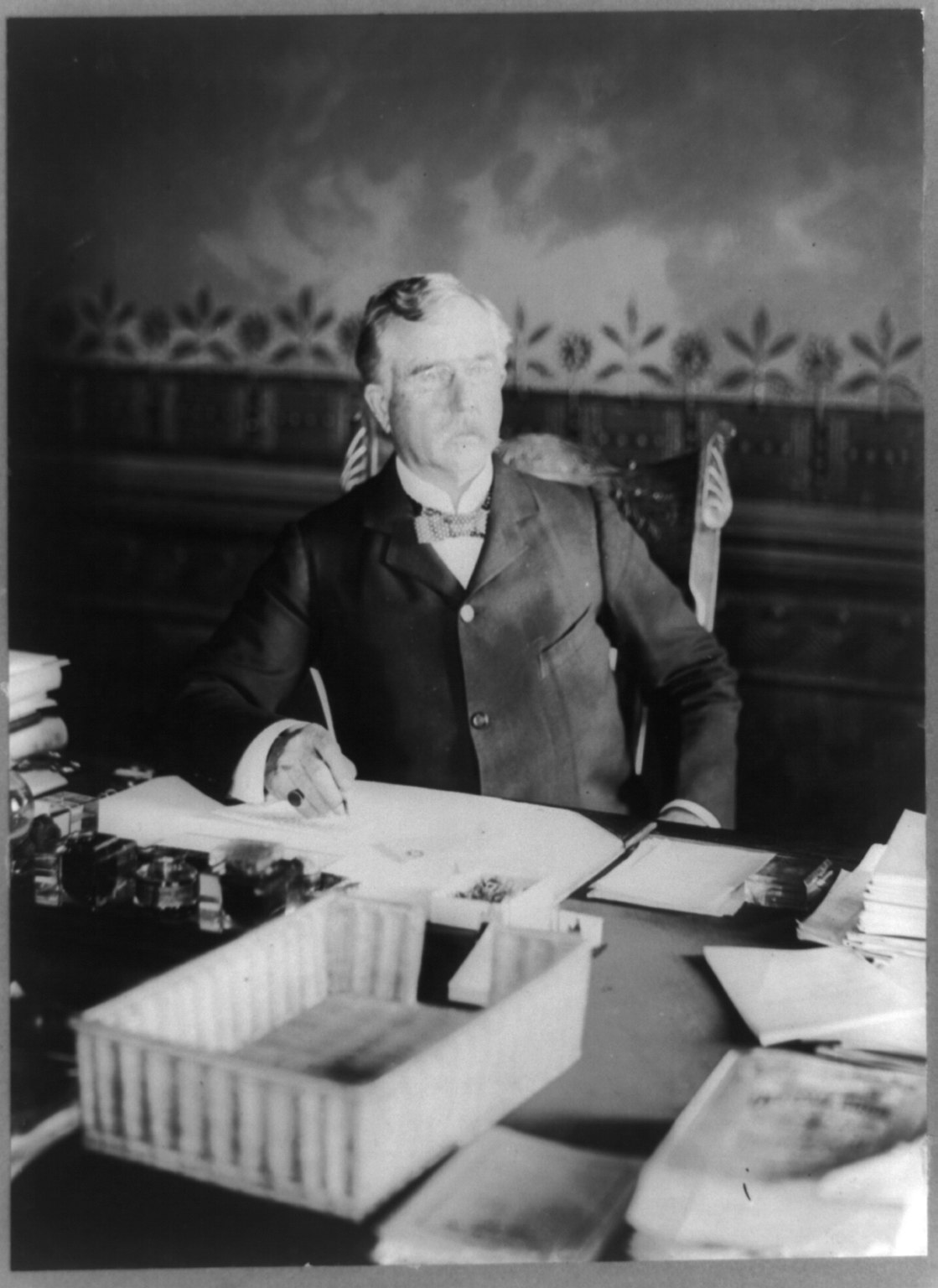
Bates in 1899 at the time of his appointment as Paymaster-General

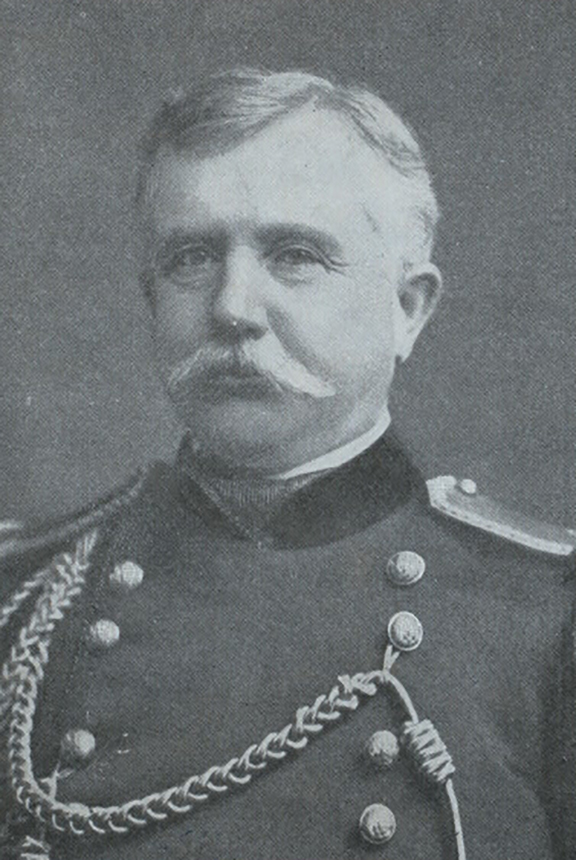
Bates as Paymaster-General of the Army, circa 1899.

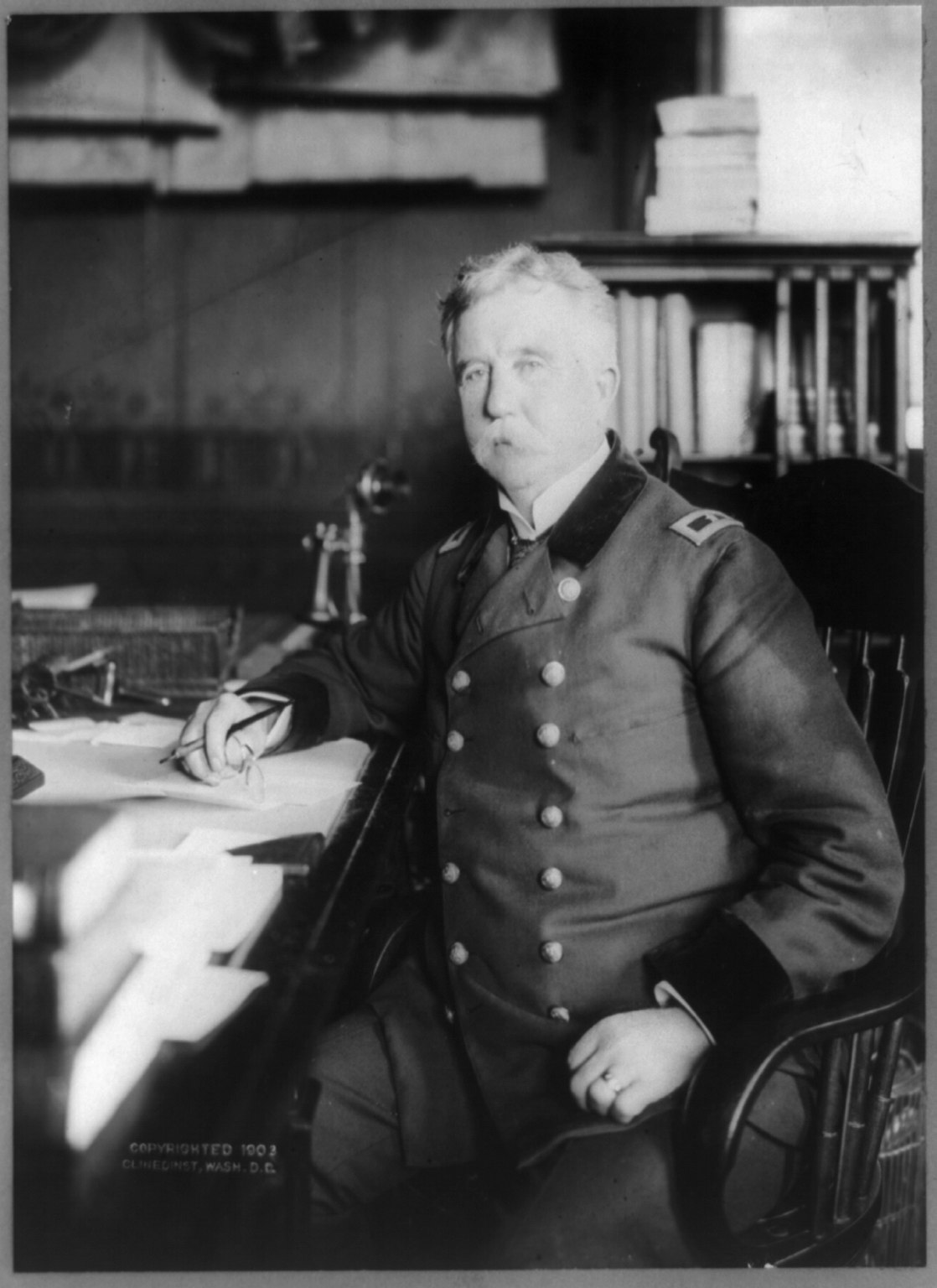
Bates as Paymaster-General, circa 1903
