= Regiment of Voltigeurs and Foot Riflemen =

- Active: February 11, 1847 – August 25, 1848
- Country: United States
- Branch: United States Army
- Type: Voltigeurs; Riflemen
- Role: Skirmishing; Light Infantry
- Size: Regiment
- Weapons: Model 1841 rifle
- Engagements: Mexican–American War

Commanders
- Notable commanders: Col. Timothy P. Andrews

The Regiment of Voltigeurs and Foot Riflemen was a one-year regiment of the United States Army raised during the Mexican–American War. It was active in 1847 and 1848.

== Background ==
At the beginning of the Mexican American War, Congress changed its policy of attempting to prosecute the war with the Regular Army and ordered nine new regiments: eight infantry and the Regiment of Voltigeurs and Foot Riflemen. The regiment was authorized on February 11, 1847 and the first officers, the colonel and the lieutenant colonel, were assigned on February 16, 1847.

== Organization ==
The regiment was commanded by Colonel Timothy P. Andrews; his second-in-command was Lieutenant Colonel Joseph E. Johnston.

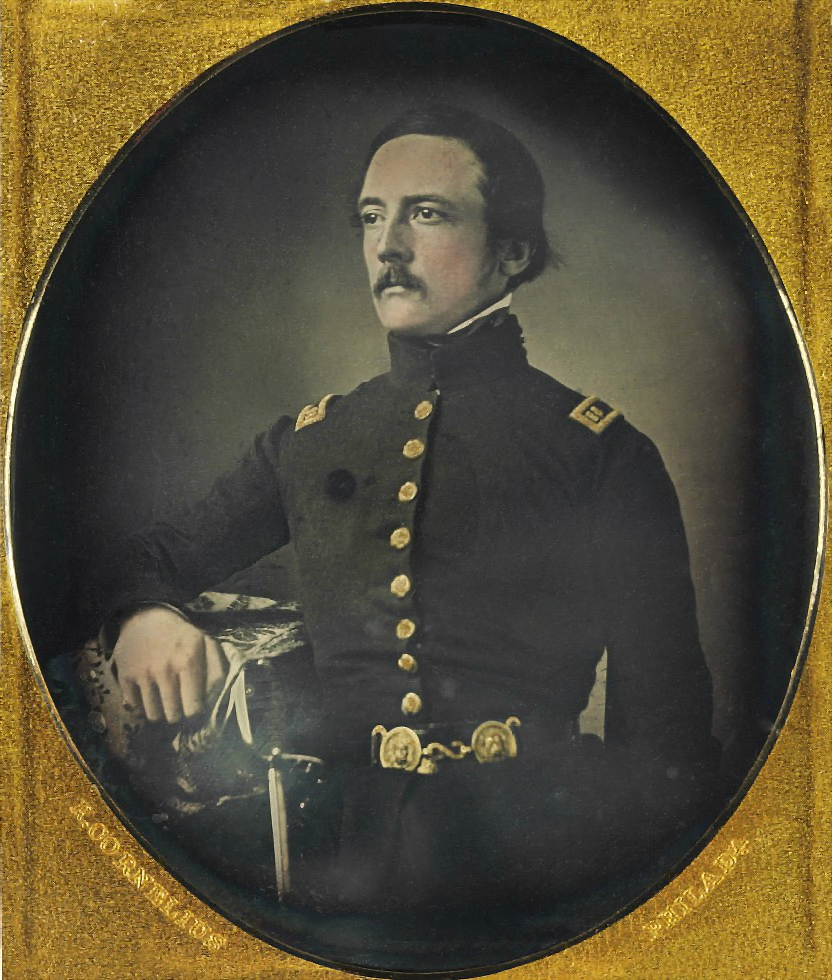
Captain Charles John Biddle during the Mexican-American War Regiment of Voltigeurs and Foot Riflemen

The regiment was one of nine new infantry regiments authorized by the United States Congress in 1847 for one year service in the Mexican-American War. The regiment was not numbered. It was to be a special unit with half of its men to be mounted, the other half were to be on foot. The intent was to have each horseman paired with a foot soldier who was to get up behind him for rapid movements.

However this arrangement was never used, the Voltigeurs became a regiment of foot riflemen, armed with the muzzle-loading Model 1841 rifle, the same rifle as was used by the Regiment of Mounted Riflemen. The Voltigeurs and Foot Riflemen regiment included a company of mountain howitzers and war rockets.

== See also ==
- List of United States military and volunteer units in the Mexican–American War

== External ==
- The Regular Army Before the Civil War
