= George R. Smith (Paymaster-General) =

US Army officer

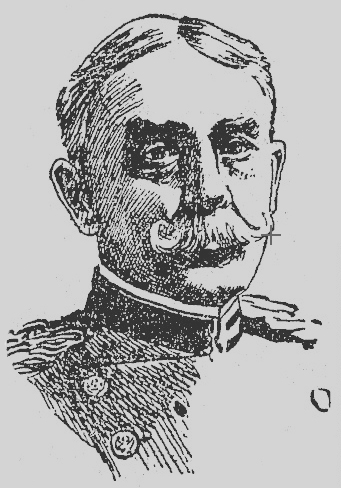
- Born: 7 May 1850; Smith's Mills, New York
- Died: 24 May 1928; Washington, D.C.

George Rodney Smith (7 May 1850 – 24 May 1928) was the last Paymaster-General of the United States Army. He graduated 31st in the United States Military Academy class of 1875. He served in the garrisons at various army camps until finding employment in the Paymaster-General's office, where Smith remained until 1890, when he served in several departments of the Army. Upon the outbreak of the Spanish–American War, Smith was transferred to Cuba, and fought in the war. He then returned to the Paymaster-General department, eventually becoming Paymaster-General, and resigning from the Army on 15 February 1913.

== Early life ==
Smith was born to Hiram Smith and Melissa P. Love on 7 May 1850. He was a cadet at the United States Military Academy, from 1 July 1870 to 16 June 1875, when he graduated, placing 31 in his class, and promoted in the Army to Second Lieutenant, in the 12th Infantry, 16 June 1875.

== Military service ==
Served in garrison at Alcatraz Island, California, 30 September to 24 October 1875, then at Camp Gaston, California from 1 November 1875, to 3 September 1878 (absent sick, 31 May 1877 to 15 January 1878), Next, Smith was at Camp Supply, Arizona from 22 October 1878, to January 1879, before going to Camp Rucker, Arizona, until 9 July 1879. Smith was then on a leave of absence to 7 October 1879, before being assigned on frontier duty at Whipple Barracks, Arizona, until March 1880. He then travelled back to Camp Rucker, until 3 April 1880, when he went to Fort Apache, Arizona, where Smith remained until 14 February 1881, then at Fort Verde, Arizona, until 14 May 1881.

Promoted to First Lieutenant, 12th Infantry, 11 January 1881. Smith was on a sick leave of absence from January to 13 December 1881, when he was moved to the in War Record Office in Washington, D. C., where he remained until 19 July 1882. Smith then worked in the Paymaster-General's Office in Washington, D. C., until December 1882, when he worked in the Paymaster duty in various cities until 1890. He was first in New Orleans, Louisiana, from December to 16 July 1884, then Atlanta, Georgia, until 11 December 1884, then again in New Orleans for several months, going back to Atlanta on June 11, 1885, where Smith remained until Apr. 25, 1886, when he travelled to Tucson, Arizona, and finally Leavenworth, Kansas from Feb. 16, 1889 to 1890.

Smith then served in the Department of the Missouri from 19 February 1889 to 7 March 1894. Then he served in the Department of the East until 27 April 1898, when he went to the Department of the Gulf. Smith was in the Division of Cuba from 14 December 1898 to May 1899, fighting in the Spanish–American War. Upon conclusion of the war, Smith went back to the Department of the East. He then served in the Philippines from 26 May 1902 to 15 November 1904, and variously in the Department of Colorado, Department of the East and the Department of California until 1909, when he was named Post Paymaster of the United States Army, where he remained until 12 February 1912. Smith was then promoted to Paymaster-General, and would serve until 15 February 1913, when he resigned from the Army. Smith died on 24 May 1928. He was awarded campaign medals for serving in the Indian Wars, Philippine Insurrection and the First Occupation of Cuba. Smith is buried in Arlington National Cemetery.

== Bibliography ==
- Cullum, George W. (1890). Biographical register of the officers and graduates of the U.S. Military Academy at West Point, N.Y., from its establishment, in 1802, to 1890 : With The early history of the United States Military Academy [volume III]. Chicago, Illinois: R. R. Donnelly and Sons, The Lakeside Press.
- Cullum, George W. (1900). Biographical Register of the Officers and Graduates of the US Military Academy at West Point New York since its Establishment in 1802: Supplement Volume IV 1890–1900. Chicago, Illinois: R. R. Donnelly and Sons, The Lakeside Press.
- Cullum, George W. (1910). Biographical Register of the Officers and Graduates of the US Military Academy at West Point New York since its Establishment in 1802: Supplement Volume V 1900–1910. Chicago, Illinois: R. R. Donnelly and Sons, The Lakeside Press.
- Cullum, George W. (1920). Biographical Register of the Officers and Graduates of the US Military Academy at West Point New York since its Establishment in 1802: Supplement Volume VI 1910–1920. Chicago, Illinois: R. R. Donnelly and Sons, The Lakeside Press.
- Cullum, George W. (1930). Biographical Register of the Officers and Graduates of the US Military Academy at West Point New York since its Establishment in 1802: Supplement Volume VII 1920–1930. Chicago, Illinois: R. R. Donnelly and Sons, The Lakeside Press.

Preceded by Charles H. Whipple	Paymaster-General of the United States Army; February 1912-August 1913	Succeeded by Position abolished
