= Paymaster-General of the United States Army =

Officer responsible for the Pay Department of the U.S. Army

The Paymaster-General of the United States Army was a general officer who was responsible for the Pay Department of the U.S. Army.

== History ==
The office of the Paymaster General was created through a resolution of the Continental Congress on 16 June 1775, which established "That there be one Paymaster General, and a Deputy under him, for the Army, in a separate department; that the pay for the Paymaster General himself be one hundred dollars per month, and for the Deputy Paymaster under him, fifty dollars per month."

The position was abolished by consolidation of the Pay Department with the Quartermaster Department and the Subsistence Department to form the Quartermaster Corps under provisions of the army appropriation act for FY 1913 (37 Stat. 591), August 24, 1912.

== Office Holders ==
No.	Name	Photo	Term began	Term ended	Notes
1	James Warren		27 July 1775	19 April 1776	Office established by resolution of the Continental Congress on June 16, 1775
2	William Palfrey		27 April 1776	December 1780	Died in office
3	John Pierce Jr.		17 January 1781	1 August 1788	Died in office
4	Joseph Howell Jr.		28 August 1788	8 May 1792	
5	Caleb Swan		8 May 1792	30 June 1808	
6	Robert Brent		30 June 1808	28 August 1819	
7	Nathaniel Towson		28 August 1819	1 June 1821	
8	Daniel Parker		1 June 1821	8 May 1822	
9	Nathaniel Towson		8 May 1822	20 July 1854	Died in office
10	Benjamin Larned		July 1854	6 September 1862	Died in office
11	Timothy Andrews		6 September 1862	29 November 1864	
12	Benjamin Brice		29 November 1864	22 February 1869	
13	Benjamin Alvord		1 January 1872	8 June 1880	
14	Nathan W. Brown		8 June 1880	6 February 1882	
15	William B. Rochester		17 February 1882	15 February 1890	
16	William Smith		10 March 1890	25 March 1895	
17	Thaddeus H. Stanton		26 March 1895	30 January 1899	
18	Asa B. Carey		30 January 1899	11 July 1899	
19	Alfred E. Bates		12 July 1899	22 January 1904	
20	Francis S. Dodge		23 January 1904	11 September 1906	
21	Culver C. Sniffen		11 September 1906	1 January 1908	
22	Charles H. Whipple		1 January 1908	15 February 1912	
23	George R. Smith		16 February 1912	24 August 1912	Position abolished when the Pay Department was merged with the Quartermaster and Subsistence Departments to form the Quartermaster Corps.
