= Joseph Howell Jr. =

Paymaster-General of the United States Army

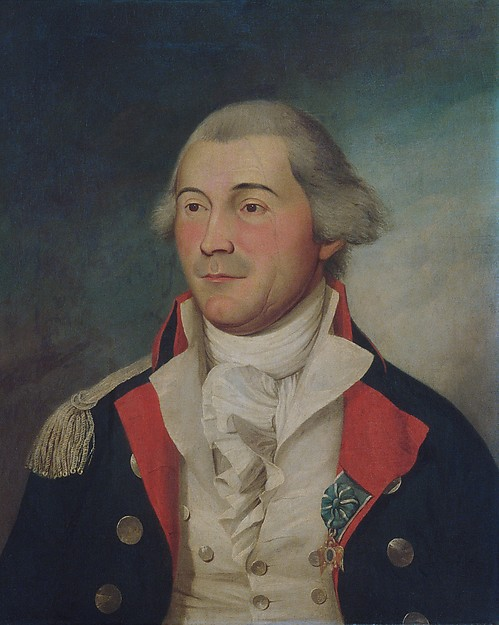
- Portrait by Charles Peale Polk. Metropolitan Museum of Art.
- Born: June 30, 1750; Philadelphia, Province of Pennsylvania
- Died: August 8, 1798 (aged 48); Philadelphia, Pennsylvania, US
- Spouse(s): Rebecca Betterton (m. 1785–1787) Hannah Kinnard (m. 1794–1798)
- Children: 3
- Military career
- Allegiance: United States
- Service: Continental Army; United States Army; Legion of the United States
- Service years: 1776–1783 (Continental Army); 1783–1792 (U.S. Army); 1792–1795 (Legion)
- Rank: Major
- Units: Pennsylvania Musketry Battalion; 2nd Pennsylvania Regiment; United States Army Pay Department
- Commands: Howell's Company, Pennsylvania Musketry Battalion; Paymaster-General of the United States Army
- Wars: American Revolutionary War

Joseph Howell Jr. (30 June 1750 – 8 August 1798) was an officer in the Continental Army during the American Revolutionary War. A veteran of the August 1776 Battle of Long Island, at which he was taken prisoner, he later served as paymaster of the 2nd Pennsylvania Regiment. Under the Articles of Confederation, Howell served at the War Department as auditor of accounts and paymaster-general. After the adoption of the United States Constitution, he served as the United States Department of War's accountant. From 1791 to 1793, Howell served as secretary of the Pennsylvania Society of the Cincinnati.

== Biography ==
Joseph Howell Jr. was born in Philadelphia on 30 June 1750, the son of Joseph Howell Sr. and Hannah (Hudson) Howell. He was raised and educated in Philadelphia and joined the Continental Army in 1776. He paid to raise and equip a company, of which he was appointed commander with the rank of captain. Howell's company was mustered into the army as part of the Pennsylvania Musketry Battalion, which was commanded by Samuel John Atlee. He was taken prisoner at the August 1776 Battle of Long Island, then held aboard the prison ship HMS Jersey.

After Howell was released in December 1776, he joined the 2nd Pennsylvania Regiment, which was commanded by Walter Stewart. Unable to continue active service in the field as the result of health complications brought on by his time as a prisoner of war, Howell was appointed the regiment's paymaster with the rank of major. As a major in the United States Army, he was appointed auditor of accounts for the Department of War under the Articles of Confederation. In 1788, he succeeded John Pierce Jr. as paymaster-general, and he served until 1792.

After the 1791 adoption of the United States Constitution, Howell served at the Department of War with a commission as a major in the newly-organized Legion of the United States. He was appointed the department's accountant, and he served in this position until resigning in April 1795. He was also an original member of the Society of the Cincinnati, and from 1791 to 1793 he was secretary of the Pennsylvania society. Howell died in Philadelphia on 8 August 1798.

== Family ==
In 1785, Howell married Rebecca Betterton. They were the parents of a son, Benjamin B., and she died in 1787. In 1794, he married Hannah Kinnard. They were the parents of two children, son Jacob L. and daughter Rebecca E.
