= Culver C. Sniffen =

US Army major general

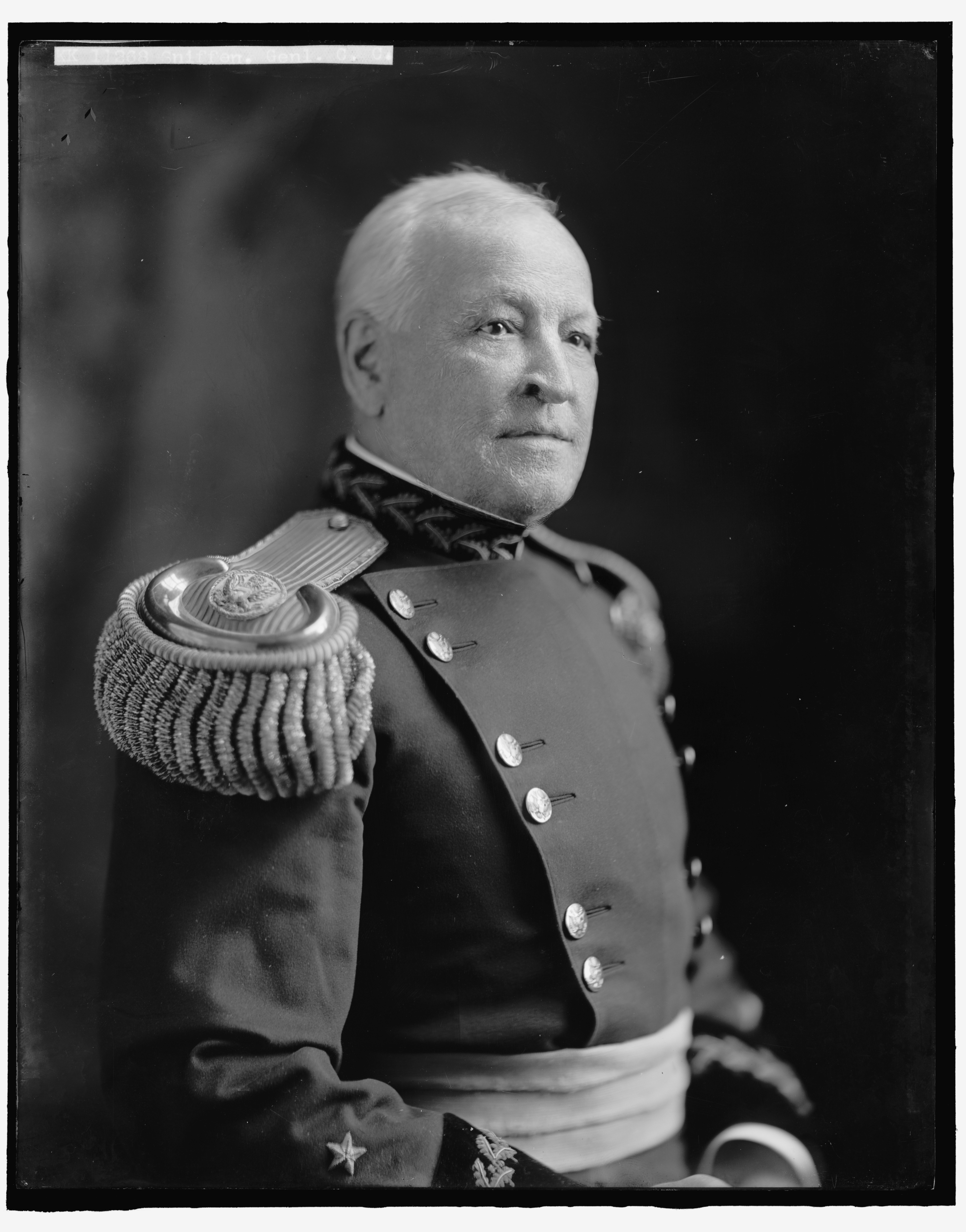
- Sniffen in 1906. Harris & Ewing Collection, Library of Congress
- Born: January 1, 1844; Manhattan, New York, US
- Died: July 28, 1930 (aged 86); Little Orleans, Maryland, US
- Burial place: Arlington National Cemetery
- Spouse(s): Ada H. Jacobi (m. 1866–1872) Rebecca Susan Ruan (m. 1873–1907) Zenobia Blanche Jordan Richardson (m. 1909–1930)
- Military career
- Service: United States Army
- Service years: 1877–1908
- Rank: Brigadier General
- Unit: United States Army Pay Department
- Commands: Chief Paymaster, Department of the Colorado; Chief Paymaster, Fifth Army Corps; Chief Paymaster, Department of the East; Paymaster-General of the United States Army
- Wars: American Indian Wars: Victorio's War; Spanish–American War

Culver C. Sniffen (1 January 1844 – 28 July 1930) was a career officer in the United States Army. He served from 1877 to 1908, and attained the rank of brigadier general as Paymaster-General of the United States Army, a post he held from 1906 to 1908.

Sniffen was a native of Manhattan, and was educated at College Grammar School in Brooklyn. During the presidential administrations of Andrew Johnson, Ulysses S. Grant, and Rutherford B. Hayes, he served in the White House as a clerk, executive clerk, assistant presidential secretary, and presidential secretary.

In 1877, Grant appointed Sniffen as a major in the army's Pay Department. He performed paymaster duties until reaching the mandatory retirement age of 64 in 1908. During the Spanish–American War, he was chief paymaster of the Fifth Army Corps in Cuba. From September 1906 until his retirement, Sniffen was the army's Paymaster-General with the rank of brigadier general.

In retirement, Sniffen resided in Washington, D.C. and spent summers in Little Orleans, Maryland. He died in Little Orleans on 28 July 1930. Sniffen was buried at Arlington National Cemetery.

== Early life ==
Culver Channing Sniffen was born in Manhattan, New York on 1 January 1844, a son of John Sniffen and Margaret Melissa (Thompson) Sniffen. He was raised in Brooklyn, and attended Brooklyn's College Grammar School. In 1866, he was appointed a clerk on the White House staff of President Andrew Johnson. In 1869, he was appointed an executive clerk on the staff of President Ulysses S. Grant. From 1873 to 1877, Sniffen was one of Grant's assistant private secretaries, then one of his private secretaries.

In February 1876, he testified at the Whiskey Ring trial of presidential aide Orville E. Babcock, a key player in the scandal. In his court appearance, Sniffen testified to his 1873 receipt of a report by Lindsay Murdoc, an internal revenue collector in Missouri, which alleged criminal activity against John McDonald and John A. Joyce, two other individuals implicated in the ring. Sniffen forwarded Murdoc's communication to John Watkinson Douglass, the Commissioner of Internal Revenue. Douglass began an investigation, but McDonald and Joyce were warned, so they were able to conceal evidence before investigators arrived.

In March 1876, it was Sniffen who replied to the United States House of Representatives when an investigating committee wanted to know the details of William W. Belknap's resignation as United States Secretary of War; he resigned in March 1876, shortly before an impeachment vote over corruption allegations. Belknap was impeached by the House but narrowly avoided conviction in the United States Senate because his resignation was accepted shortly before the House vote, and several senators believed they did not have the authority to convict Belknap once he had resigned.

In January 1877, new reports indicated that Grant intended to nominate Sniffen as Surveyor General of Arizona Territory, one of several appointments the outgoing president conferred on members of his staff. Sniffen requested that the appointment be withdrawn, which he also did with Grant's subsequent appointment of Sniffen as Secretary of Montana Territory.

=== Marriages ===
Sniffen was married three times. In 1866, he married Ada H. Jacobi, who died in 1872. In 1873, he wed Rebecca Susan Ruan; she died in 1907. He married Zenobia Blanche (Jordan) Richardson in 1909; they were married until his death, and she died in 1948.

== Continued career ==
On 3 March 1877, the last full day of Grant's presidency, he commissioned Sniffen as a major and appointed him to the United States Army's Pay Department. The United States Senate confirmed the appointment on 8 March, and Sniffen was assigned to temporary duty at the War Department. While assigned to the War Department, Sniffen actually continued serving at the White House to aid the transition from Grant to the incoming administration of President Rutherford B. Hayes. After his initial duty in Washington, D.C, in November 1877 Sniffen was posted to the Military Division of the Pacific, then assigned to the division's Department of California headquarters in San Francisco. After reporting to San Francisco, Sniffen was assigned to duty in Arizona, where he remained for the next two years. His duties in Arizona included travel between military posts to pay soldiers during Victorio's War, and in May 1880, Sniffen and his escort narrowly missed being ambushed by members of Victorio's band.

In June 1881, Sniffen was transferred to paymaster duties with the Department of the Platte, which was headquartered in Omaha. After serving at the department's Fort D. A. Russell, Wyoming, in May 1885, he was reassigned to paymaster duties with the Department of the East and stationed in New York City. In February 1890, he was assigned to act as the army's paymaster-general, pending selection of a replacement for William B. Rochester. In March, President Benjamin Harrison appointed William Smith, and Sniffen returned to duty in New York City.

In November 1891, Sniffen was performing paymaster duties at Fort Clark, Texas when a portion of the cash for which he was responsible was stolen; according to news accounts, the money was locked in a cell of the post guardhouse, after which someone removed one of the sacks of money without being observed. Two soldiers who had recently been discharged were suspected, and were later arrested soon after the theft. Only about $340 of the stolen $3,300 ($117,000 in 2025) was recovered, and in June 1892 the United States Court of Claims absolved Sniffen of responsibility for the loss. The United States Department of the Treasury was ordered to credit his accounts with $2,958 and balance his account with the government.

== Later career ==
After several years in Texas, in April 1895, Sniffen was assigned to paymaster duties with the Department of the East. In December 1896, he was posted to Denver as chief paymaster of the Department of the Colorado. During the Spanish–American War in 1898, Sniffen served as chief paymaster of the Fifth Army Corps, first in Cuba, and later at Camp Wikoff, New York.

In 1899, Sniffen was promoted to Lieutenant Colonel and assigned as deputy paymaster-general of the U.S. Army. From 1901 to 1906, he was the army's assistant paymaster-general and chief paymaster of the army's Department of the East with the rank of colonel. Sniffen was promoted to brigadier general in September 1906 and assigned as Paymaster-General of the United States Army. At the time, promotions were generally based on seniority, and Colonel Albert S. Towar was senior to Sniffen by two years, but he was also a year younger. To enable Sniffen to receive promotion to brigadier general before reaching the mandatory retirement age of 64 in 1908, Towar volunteered to waive seniority. (Note: Towar was in line for promotion to brigadier general and appointment as paymaster-general after Sniffen, but instead requested retirement as a colonel in 1907 because of disability.) Sniffen served as paymaster-general until reaching the mandatory retirement age of 64 in January 1908.

Sniffen was a Freemason. In addition, he belonged to the Military Order of Foreign Wars and the Sons of the American Revolution. He was a member of Washington's Army and Navy Club and National Press Club. His memberships also included the Army and Navy Club of New York City and the Military Service Institution of the United States.

In retirement, Sniffen was a resident of Washington, DC and spent summers at Town Hill, Maryland. His hobbies included photography, photograph collecting, and autograph collecting; many of the photos he took won local prizes, and his autograph collection was considered to be the most valuable in Washington. Sniffen was also a driving enthusiast and continued to make trips by car almost until his death.

Sniffen died at the Town Hill Hotel in Little Orleans, Maryland on 28 July 1930. He was buried at Arlington National Cemetery.

== Dates of rank ==
Sniffen's dates of rank were:

- Major, 3 March 1877
- Lieutenant Colonel, 31 March 1899
- Colonel, 3 May 1901
- Brigadier General, 11 September 1906
- Brigadier General (retired), 1 January 1908
