= William Smith (paymaster general) =

U.S. Army Paymaster-General

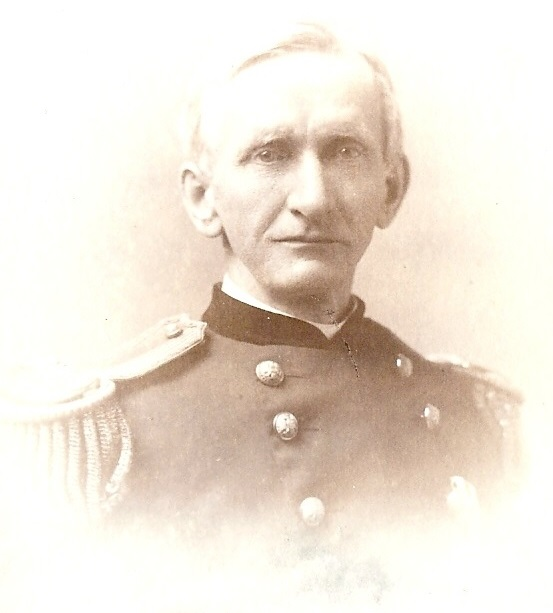
- Circa 1895. Unknown photographer.
- Born: March 26, 1831; Orwell, Vermont, U.S.
- Died: January 17, 1912 (aged 80); Pelham Manor, New York, U.S.
- Burial place: Mountain View Cemetery, Orwell, Vermont, U.S.
- Alma mater: University of Vermont
- Spouse: Mary Otto McAllister (m. 1867–1912)
- Children: 3
- Military career
- Allegiance: Union; United States
- Service: Union Army; United States Army
- Service years: 1861–1866 (Union); 1867–1895 (Army)
- Rank: Brigadier General
- Unit: U.S. Army Pay Department
- Commands: Paymaster-General of the United States Army
- Wars: American Civil War

William Smith (March 26, 1831 – January 17, 1912) was a career officer in the United States Army. A Union Army veteran of the American Civil War, he served from 1861 to 1895 and was most notable for his service as Paymaster-General of the United States Army from 1890 to 1895.

== Early life ==
William Smith was born in Orwell, Vermont from March 26, 1831, a son of Israel Smith 1790–1865) and Delia Ferguson Smith (1795–1882). He attended the schools of Orwell and taught school while attending the University of Vermont (UVM), from which he graduated in 1854 with an AB. In 1856, UVM awarded him an AM. After graduating, Smith taught school while studying law. Smith's father had served as a paymaster with the 30th Infantry Regiment during the War of 1812, and when Smith informed his father he was considering military service during the American Civil War, his father suggested that paymaster duties would be a favorable choice.

== Career ==
In August 1861, Smith's application for a commission was approved, and he was appointed a paymaster in the Union Army. He served as an assistant paymaster for the Department of Washington in Washington, D.C. until February 1862, when he was ordered to the Department of Kentucky in Louisville, where he performed paymaster duties until late 1864. He was then transferred to the Department of the Northwest in Saint Paul, Minnesota, where he continued to serve as a paymaster. In March 1865, he received brevet promotion to lieutenant colonel, and he was discharged in July 1866.

Smith was recommissioned as a major in the paymaster corps in January 1867, and continued to serve in Saint Paul. Later that year he was again posted to Louisville, and he served in San Antonio, Texas from 1869 to 1870. He served in New Orleans from 1870 to 1872, and Sioux City, Iowa from 1872 and 1873. He served in Saint Paul again from 1873 to 1880. Smith was posted to Washington, D.C. from 1880 to 1884, and St. Paul from 1884 to 1887. Smith served in Chicago, Illinois from 1886 to 1890, and he was promoted to lieutenant colonel in September 1888. From 1888 to 1890, Smith served again in Saint Paul.

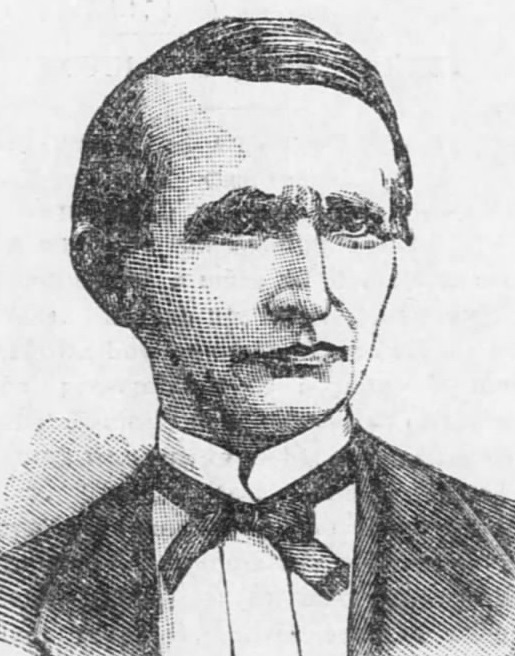
1890 newspaper illustration

In March 1890, Smith was promoted to Paymaster-General of the United States Army and promoted to brigadier general. His selection was unexpected, because at the time, Smith ranked fourth in seniority in the paymaster department, and those ahead of him included his brother Rodney (1829–1915), who was also a career U.S. Army paymaster. In fact, when Smith was informed of his promotion, he was giving an interview to a newspaper reporter, which included his prediction that Rodney Smith would receive the appointment. According to contemporary news accounts, Smith had visited President Benjamin Harrison to make the case for appointing Rodney Smith, and made such a favorable impression on Harrison that Harrison decided to appoint him instead. Smith served until March 25, 1895, when he left the military after reaching the mandatory retirement age of 64. He was succeeded by Thaddeus Harlan Stanton.

== Later life ==
In retirement, Smith was a resident first of St. Paul, and later of Pelham Manor, New York. As a result of his Civil War service, he was a member of the Military Order of the Loyal Legion of the United States. Smith was a member of the Sons of the American Revolution by right of descent from his grandfather Pliny Smith, a Massachusetts Militia veteran of the American Revolutionary War.

Smith died in Pelham Manor on January 17, 1912. He was buried at Mountain View Cemetery in Orwell.

== Family ==
In October 1867, Smith married Mary Otto McAllister (1843–1935), the daughter of prominent businessman John Hanna McAllister. They were the parents of three children: Katherine Delia (1873–1951), William McAllister (1875–1966), and Harry Hall (1877–1909).
