= Benjamin Larned =

US Army Paymaster General

Benjamin Franklin Larned
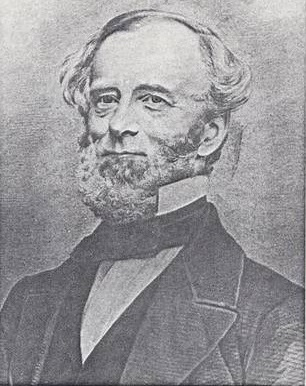
- Born: September 6, 1794; Pittsfield, Massachusetts, US
- Died: September 6, 1862 (aged 68) Washington, D.C., US
- Buried: Pittsfield Cemetery
- Allegiance: United States
- Branch: United States Army
- Service years: 1813–1862
- Rank: Colonel
- Commands: Paymaster-General of the United States Army
- Conflicts: War of 1812; Capture of Fort Erie

Benjamin Franklin Larned (September 6, 1794 – September 6, 1862) was an American colonel who served as Paymaster General of the United States Army from July 1854 until his death. Larned was a career officer, fighting in the War of 1812 and rising from ensign to brevet captain for his service at the Capture of Fort Erie. Fort Larned and the nearby town of Larned, Kansas, were named in his honor.

== Life and career ==
Larned was born on September 6, 1794, in Pittsfield, Massachusetts. He served in the War of 1812, enlisting as an ensign and rising to first lieutenant and regimental paymaster during the war. He commanded a company in the Capture of Fort Erie and was brevetted captain for gallantry.

Larned served in the pay department for four and a half decades. He rose to deputy paymaster in 1847 as a lieutenant colonel. When Nathaniel Towson died in 1853, he became paymaster general as a full colonel. Temporarily relieved from this post on July 15, 1862, due to ill health, Larned died on September 6, 1862, in Washington, D.C. Timothy P. Andrews became Paymaster General after him.

On May 29, 1860, pursuant to General Order No. 14, a small military post in Kansas was named Fort Larned in his honor. Founded in 1859, the fort is now a national historic site. The nearby town of Larned, Kansas, was also named in honor of Larned, who had never visited Kansas.
