= Timothy Andrews (general) =

US Army officer (died 1868)

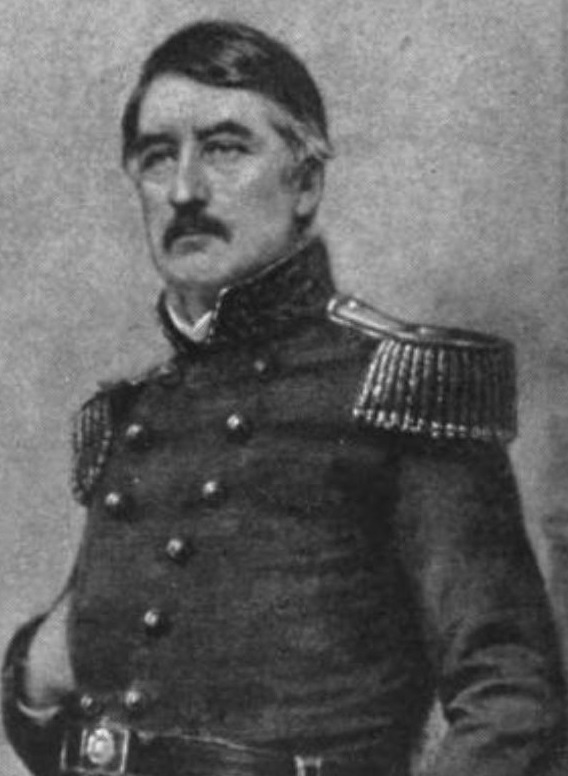
- Born: 1794; Ireland
- Died: March 11, 1868 (aged 73–74)
- Burial place: Rock Creek Cemetery; Washington, D.C., U.S.
- Relatives: Col. Richard Snowden Andrews (son); Col. Charles Marshall (son-in-law)
- Military career
- Allegiance: United States of America; Union
- Branch: United States Army; Union Army
- Service years: 1814–1864
- Rank: Colonel; Bvt. Brigadier General
- Commands: Regiment of Voltigeurs and Foot Riflemen; Paymaster-General of the United States Army
- Conflicts: War of 1812; Mexican–American War; Battle of Molino del Rey; Battle of Chapultepec; American Civil War

Timothy Patrick Andrews (1794 – March 11, 1868) was an Irish-born, career U.S. Army officer. He served as Paymaster General of the Union Army during the American Civil War.

== Personal life ==
Timothy Patrick Andrews was born in Ireland, the son of George and Elizabeth Andrews. Along with his father, he immigrated to the United States in 1798.

Andrews and his wife Emily Roseville Andrews children:

- Richard Snowden Andrews, who fought for the Confederate States of America
- Emily Andrews first wife of Colonel Charles Marshall CSA

== Career ==
Andrews' military service began in 1814, when he served as an aid to Commodore Joshua Barney during the War of 1812. He served as a paymaster in the Army from 1822 to 1847.

During the Mexican–American War, he was put in command of the Regiment of Voltigeurs and Foot Riflemen. His second in command, Lieutenant Colonel Joseph E. Johnston would go on to become one of the most senior general officers in the Confederate States Army during the American Civil War. He was distinguished for bravery at the Battle of Molino del Rey, and was brevetted brigadier general for conspicuous gallantry at the Battle of Chapultepec, where his regiment led the assault on Chapultepec Castle.

After the Mexican War Andrews returned to the pay department of the Army, gradually rising in rank. In late 1851 Andrews was promoted to Deputy Paymaster-General and in September 1862 became Paymaster-General of the United States Army, succeeding Benjamin Larned.

Andrews retired from military service on November 29, 1864.

== Death ==
Andrews died on March 11, 1868, at the age of 75 and was interred at Rock Creek Cemetery in Washington D.C.

== See also ==
- Battle of Chapultepec
- List of U.S. Army, Navy, and volunteer units in the Mexican–American War
- List of American Civil War brevet generals (Union)
