= Johnnie H. Corns =

United States Army general (1936–2020)

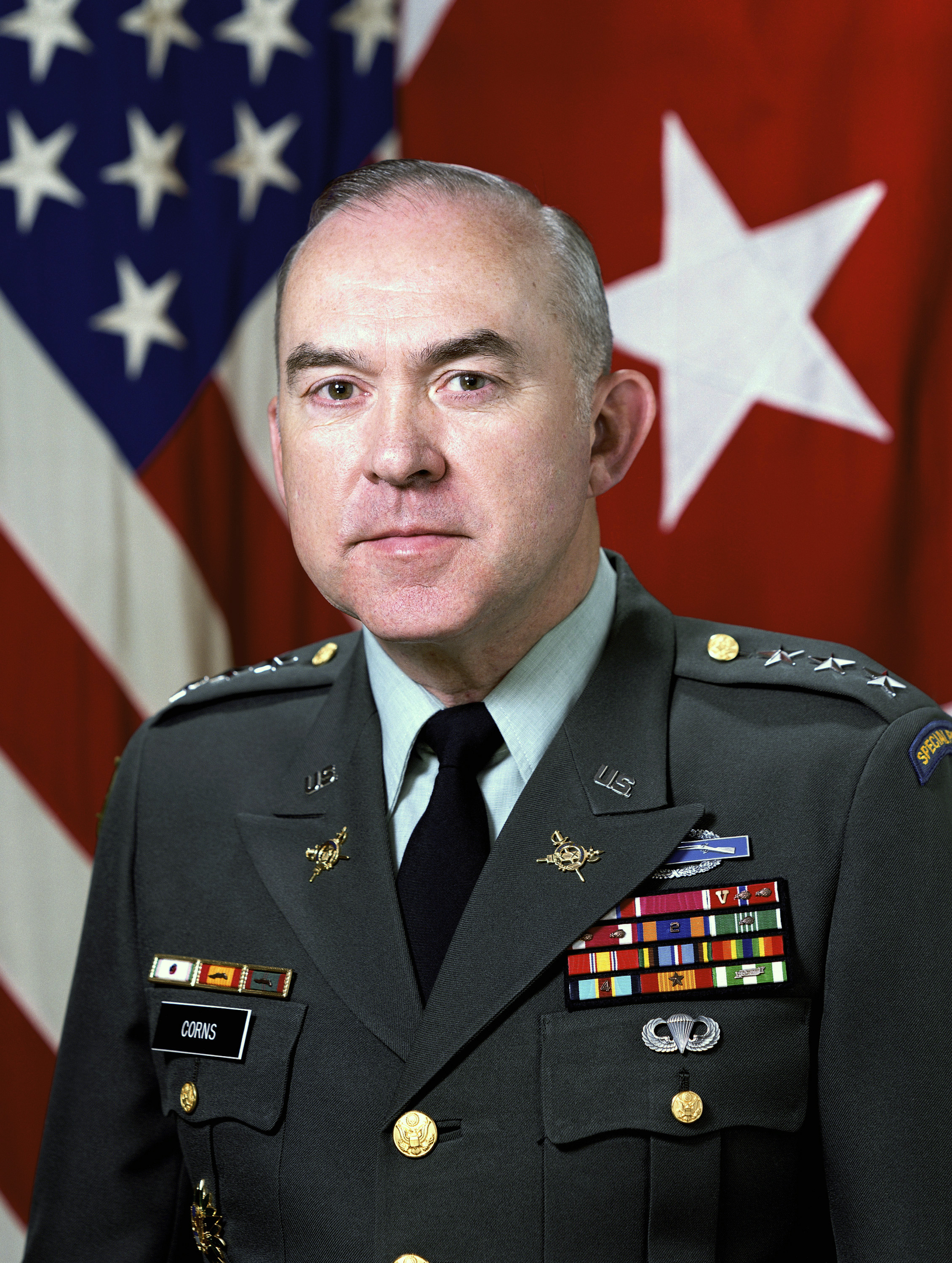
- Born: March 21, 1936; Gordon, West Virginia, US
- Died: May 12, 2020 (aged 84); Churchville, Virginia, US
- Military career
- Allegiance: United States of America
- Branch: United States Army
- Service years: 1958–1993
- Rank: lieutenant general
- Commands: United States Army Pacific; United States Army Japan; 6th Infantry Division; 2nd Brigade, 2nd Infantry Division
- Conflicts: Vietnam War

John Herman Corns (March 21, 1936 – May 12, 2020) was a lieutenant general in the United States Army who served as commander of United States Army Pacific from 1991 until 1993.

Corns was a 1954 graduate of South Charleston High School in West Virginia. He received a B.A. degree in civil government from Marshall University in 1958 and later earned an M.S. degree in public administration from Shippensburg State College. He also received military education at the Armed Forces Staff College and the US Army War College. He was commissioned as a second lieutenant from the ROTC in November 1958. He then went on to serve in the Infantry and Special Forces in Vietnam. His first major command was brigade commander for 2nd Brigade, 2nd Infantry Division, Korea from 1978 to 1979. Upon promotion to major general, Corns commanded the 6th Infantry Division (Light) as well as Fort Richardson, Alaska from 1986 to 1988. From there he served as commanding general, United States Army Japan and commanding general, IX Corps, APO San Francisco until 1989.

Additional major duty assignments for Corns included serving as the chief of the Plans and Operations Division for the chief of legislative liaison, US Army, as well as deputy chief, legislative liaison, for the Secretary of the US Army. He served as assistant division commander for the 7th Infantry Division, Fort Ord, California, and deputy chief of staff for training for the United States Army Training and Doctrine Command, Fort Monroe, Virginia. Gen. Corns was the inspector general for the US Army in Washington, DC from 1989 to 1991. He retired on November 30, 1993.

His awards include the Distinguished Service Medal, the Legion of Merit, the Bronze Star Medal, the Meritorious Service Medal, and the Army Staff Identification Badge.

Corns died on May 12, 2020, at the age of 84. He was interred at Arlington National Cemetery on June 24, 2020.

Military offices
Preceded by Claude M. Kicklighter	Commander of the United States Army Pacific; 1991–1993	Succeeded by Robert L. Ord, III
Preceded by Henry Doctor Jr.	Inspector General of the United States Army; December 1989 – July 1991	Succeeded by Ronald H. Griffith
