= Daniel Isom Sultan =

United States Army general (1885–1947)

Daniel I. Sultan
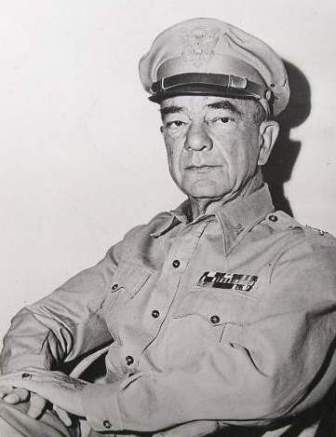
- Daniel I. Sultan
- Born: December 9, 1885; Oxford, Mississippi, United States
- Died: January 14, 1947 (aged 61); Washington, D.C., United States
- Burial place: West Point Cemetery, New York, United States
- Military career
- Allegiance: United States of America
- Branch: United States Army
- Service years: 1907–1947
- Rank: Lieutenant General
- Commands: 38th Infantry Division; VIII Corps; Burma-India Theater; Inspector General of the U.S. Army
- Conflicts: World War I World War II
- Awards: Army Distinguished Service Medal (4); Legion of Merit; Bronze Star Medal; Air Medal (posthumous); Companion of the Order of the Bath (United Kingdom); Congressional Medal of Distinction (Nicaragua); Presidential Medal of Merit (Nicaragua); Order of the Cloud and Banner, with Special Grand Cordon (China)

Engineer Commissioner of the District of Columbia
- In office August 22, 1932 – September 7, 1938
- Preceded by: John C. Gotwals
- Succeeded by: David McCoach, Jr.

Daniel Isom Sultan (December 9, 1885 – January 14, 1947) was an American general. Sultan was born in Oxford, Mississippi, and graduated from the United States Military Academy in 1907. He entered the United States Army Corps of Engineers and rose through the ranks, teaching engineering at West Point from 1912 to 1916, before travelling to the Philippines. He oversaw construction of fortifications on various islands, and eventually was in charge of all US Army fortification work in the Philippines. He then served on the War Department General Staff and the general staff of the American Expeditionary Forces until 1922. Sultan led the Nicaragua Canal Survey and commanded American troops in the country from 1929 to 1931, when he returned to the United States and wrote a report on the canal.

Sultan next was district engineer in Chicago, leading construction of the Great Lakes to Mississippi Waterway to July 1934. He was then involved in various commissions in Washington DC, and served as engineer commissioner of the District of Columbia. In late 1938, he took command of the 2d Regiment of Engineers, and eventually rose to lead the Hawaiian Division in early 1941. Sultan had various other commands during early World War II, including the 38th Infantry Division and VIII Corps. In 1943, he was made deputy commander of the China-Burma-India Theater, and assumed command of the Burma-India Theater in October 1944. In 1945, he was made Inspector General of the United States Army, and served in that position until his death in 1947. He was awarded the Distinguished Service Medal four times, the Legion of Merit, the Bronze Star Medal, and made a Companion of the Order of the Bath.

== Early life ==
Sultan was born on December 9, 1885, in Oxford, Mississippi, to a planter. After attending the University of Mississippi from 1901 to 1903, he attended the United States Military Academy from June 15, 1903, to June 14, 1907, becoming an All-American as a center in football. He graduated 9th in a class of 111.

== Early military service ==
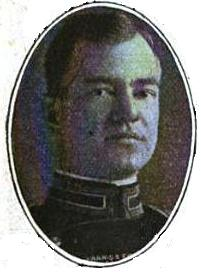
Sultan as a West Point cadet

He was commissioned a second lieutenant in the United States Army Corps of Engineers upon graduation, and served in the Third Battalion of Engineers at Fort Leavenworth, Kansas, from September 14 to October 1, 1908. He then was stationed at the Washington Barracks from October 3, 1908, to August 24, 1912. While there, Sultan graduated from the Engineer School on February 23, 1910; was the secretary of school from September 7, 1909, to April 12, 1912; was adjutant of the First Battalion of Engineers from October 1, 1909, to April 12, 1912; was a member of the Board on Engineer Troops from March 1 to September 7, 1912; and was promoted to first lieutenant on February 27, 1911.

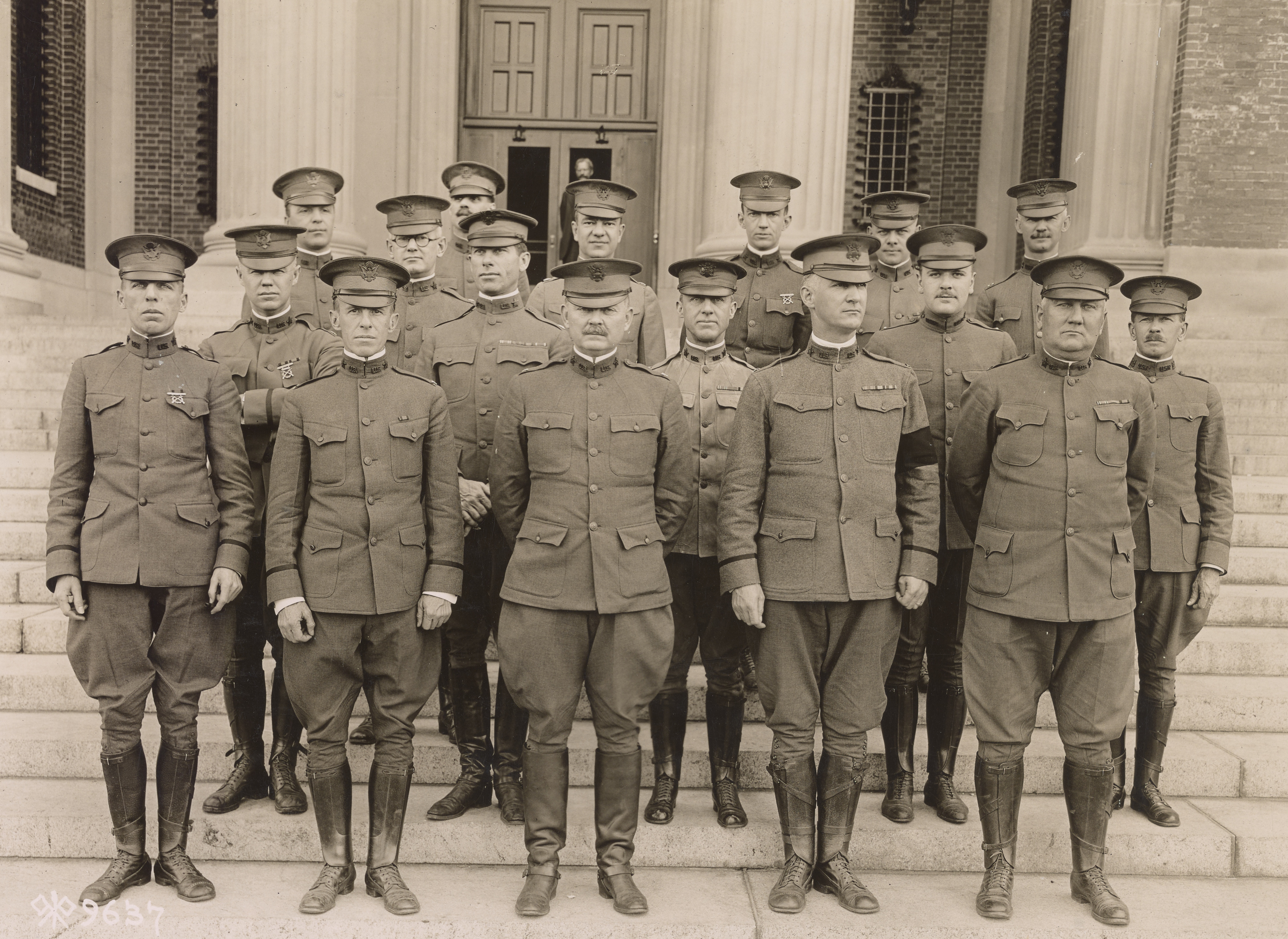
Officers of the War Plans Branch, War Plans Division, General Staff, standing outside the entrance of the Army War College at Washington, D.C., May 1918. Lieutenant Colonel Daniel I. Sultan is standing in the middle of the back row, between Captain Robert L. Eichelberger (right) and Lieutenant W. J. Green (left).

Sultan taught at West Point in the department of engineering and served as an assistant football coach from August 24, 1912, to July 18, 1916, and was made a captain on February 27, 1914. In September 1916, he was sent to Fort Mills, on Corregidor Island in the Philippines, where he was in charge of the construction and maintenance of fortifications on Corregidor, Caballo and Grande Islands. While there, he was made a major on May 15, 1917, and a temporary lieutenant-colonel on August 5, 1917. Sultan served in that capacity until October 18, 1917, when he was moved to Manila and placed in charge of all Philippines fortification work on October 19. He left Manila on January 14, 1918, and returned to the United States.

On January 21, he was assigned to the War Department General Staff, and served on the staff in Washington, D.C. from March 4, 1918, to June 1919, during which time he was made a colonel on July 13, 1918. Sultan was assigned to duty as general staff officer at the headquarters of the American Expeditionary Forces in France from June 1919, to October 1919, when he returned to duty with the War Department General Staff at Washington, D. C.. He was relieved from duty as a general staff officer on January 20, 1922, but continued on with the general staff until August 1922. He had returned to the rank of major on March 15, 1920. For his work as a general staff member, Sultan was awarded the Army Distinguished Service Medal. The citation for the medal reads:

The President of the United States of America, authorized by Act of Congress, July 9, 1918, takes pleasure in presenting the Army Distinguished Service Medal to Colonel (Corps of Engineers) Daniel Isom Sultan (ASN: O-2212), United States Army, for exceptionally meritorious and distinguished services to the Government of the United States, in a duty of great responsibility during World War I. As Chief of the Personnel Section in the Office of the Executive Assistant to the Chief of Staff of the Army during the war and the demobilization, Colonel Sultan formulated policies covering commissioned personnel and handled with marked ability many complex questions of grave importance to the War Department and to the entire Army. His work was characterized by conspicuous breadth of vision and keen foresight. His splendid judgment and the sound policies initiated by him contributed in a large measure to the successful handling of the commissioned personnel of the Army. He rendered service of signal worth to the Government in a position of great responsibility.

== Later military service ==
Sultan was then at Fort Leavenworth as a student officer at the Command and General Staff School from August 1922 to July 1923, and graduated as an 'honor graduate'. He moved to Savannah, Georgia and was the district engineer, in charge of all river and harbor improvements and fortifications in the region, from August 1923 to August 1925. Sultan attended the Army War College from August 1925 to July 1926; and was then a resident member of Board of Engineers for Rivers and Harbors in Washington, DC from July 1926 to August 1929.

=== Nicaragua survey ===
Sultan traveled to Nicaragua from August 20 to 29, arriving in Corinto and making his way to Granada. He was in charge of the Nicaragua Canal Survey and commanding US Army troops in Nicaragua beginning in August 1929. The survey gradually made its way through the country, finishing its work in the summer of 1931. On March 31, 1931, Managua was hit by a devastating earthquake. Sultan organized a relief team of 34 soldiers, and was on an emergency committee for responding. He was charged with overseeing the restoration of railroads and water to the city, and chaired a food relief committee that provided 24,000 rations daily by April 24.

While in Nicaragua, he was promoted to lieutenant-colonel on October 1, 1930, and was made a member of the Interoceanic Canal Board on March 31. Sultan's command ended in July 1931, and he soon returned to Washington, DC. Sultan then worked on a report about the survey from August 1931 to January 1932. He concluded in a document published as a congressional document that “A canal through Nicaragua will aid our national defense, will foster friendly relations with all Latin America, and will promote trade with Central and South America. It will provide a shorter route from port to port for about two-thirds of the traffic now using the Panama Canal.” He also published an article about the survey in National Geographic Magazine. Sultan was awarded an oak leaf cluster to his Distinguished Service Medal for his work in Nicaragua, particularly for his response to the earthquake. He was also awarded the Nicaraguan Congressional Medal of Distinction and Presidential Medal of Merit.

=== Commissioner ===
He was then made district engineer in Chicago, leading construction of the Great Lakes to Mississippi Waterway until July 1934, during which time he was also the administrator of the Civil Works Administration in Cook County, Illinois. From July to September 1934 he worked with the Board of Engineers for Rivers and Harbors. Sultan then worked as engineer commissioner of the District of Columbia, a member of the National Capital Park and Planning Commission, the Public Utilities Commission, the Unemployment Compensation Board, and chairman of the Zoning Commission until September 1938. He was made a colonel on October 1, 1935, and vice-chairman of committee that arranged the inauguration of President Franklin D. Roosevelt in January 1937.

=== World War II ===
Sultan then commanded the 2d Regiment of Engineers from October to December 1, 1938, and was promoted to brigadier general on December 1. He commanded Fort Logan, Colorado until June 1939, and led the 22nd Infantry Brigade from July 1939 to February 1941. He led the Hawaiian Division from February 1941 to April 1941, and was promoted to major general on April 3, 1941. Sultan was in command of the 38th Infantry Division from May 1941 to April 1942, and led the VIII Corps until November 1943. He was then ordered to the China-Burma-India Theater in 1943 to act as deputy commander under General Joseph Stilwell. As deputy commander stationed in Allied-controlled New Delhi, Sultan focused largely on logistical issues, ensuring that sufficient supplies arrived in China, particularly by airlifting goods over the Himalayas and constructing the Ledo Road. He was promoted to lieutenant general on September 2, 1944, and on October 24 became commander of the India-Burma Theater. (Note: A separate theater was created, not including China, with Sultan as the commander.)

As commander, Sultan was under the authority of Louis Mountbatten, 1st Earl Mountbatten of Burma, the Supreme Allied Commander, South East Asia Command, and also served as commander of the Chinese Army in India. Sultan personally led a force of American, British and Chinese forces, known as the Northern Combat Area Command (NCAC). In 1944, the Allies formulated a plan, known as Operation Capital, to retake Northern Burma and reopen a land route to China. In early 1945, the NCAC was split into the 30th, 38th, and 50th Chinese Divisions; the British 36th Division, on loan from the Fourteenth Army; and the recently activated American 5332d Brigade (Provisional). Sultan's troops traveled south during the Burma campaign, from Myitkyina, forcing the Japanese Thirty-Third Army back. His forces took control of the Burma Road, reopening it in January 1945. For his service as commander, he was awarded a third oak leaf cluster, the Bronze Star Medal, and the Legion of Merit. Returning to the United States June 26, 1945, he was appointed Inspector General of the Army on July 9. Sultan died from an acute heart ailment on January 14, 1947, at the Walter Reed General Hospital in Washington, D.C., while on active duty. He was buried at the West Point Cemetery four days later. Sultan was awarded his fourth oak leaf cluster to the Distinguished Service Medal as inspector general, the first army officer to do so. He was made a Companion of the Order of the Bath (United Kingdom) and granted the Order of the Cloud and Banner with Special Grand Cordon. After his death he was awarded the Air Medal.

== Legacy ==
The United States Navy transport ship USNS General Daniel I. Sultan (T-AP-120) was named in his honor.

Military offices
Preceded by Virgil L. Peterson	Inspector General of the U. S. Army; July 14, 1945 – January 14, 1947	Succeeded by Ira T. Wyche
