= VIII Corps (United States) =

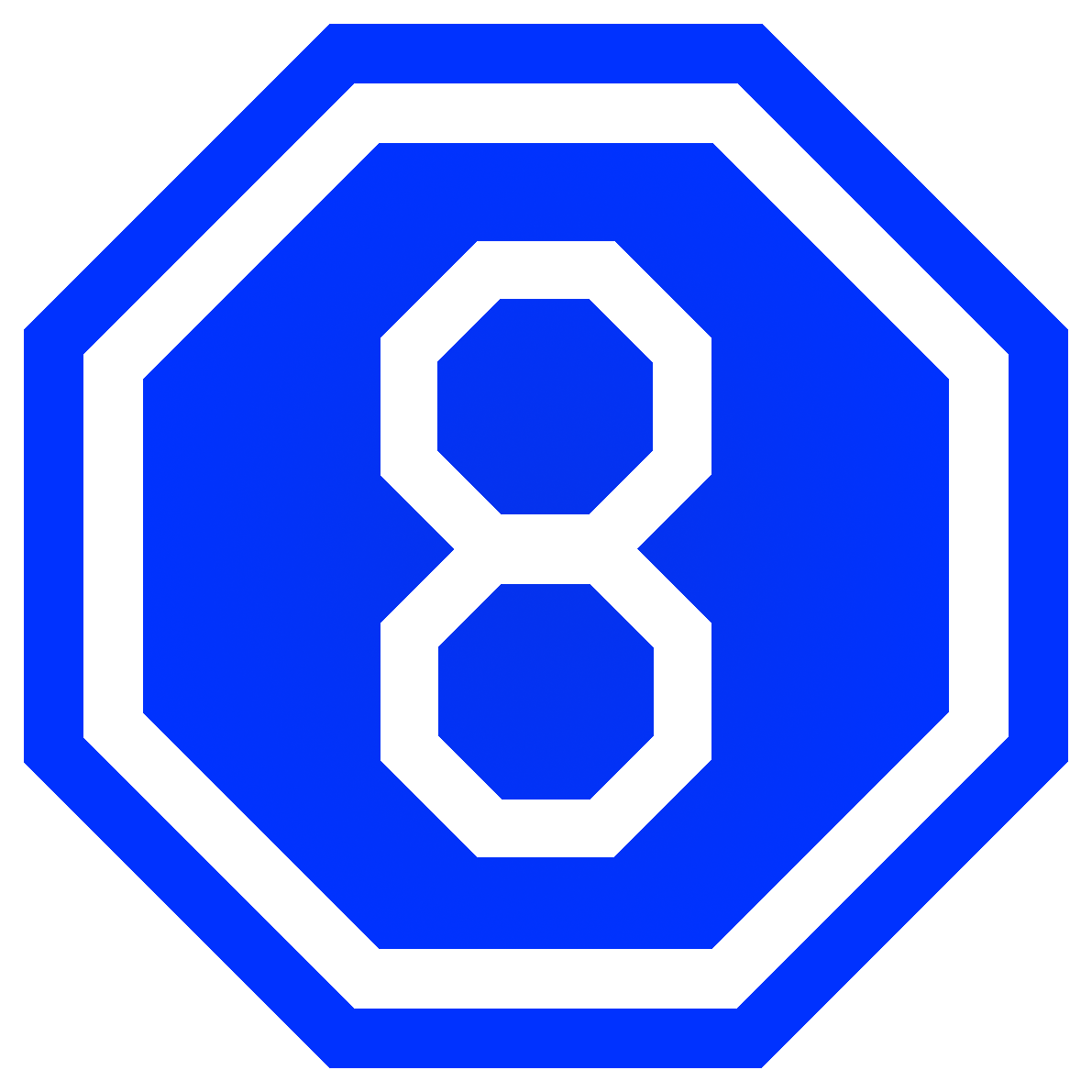
- Shoulder sleeve insignia of VIII Corps
- Active: 26 November 1918–20 April 1919; 29 July 1921–15 December 1945; 20 November 1957–1 April 1968
- Country: United States of America
- Branch: United States Army
- Role: Headquarters
- Size: Corps
- Engagements: World War II; Normandy; Northern France; Rhineland; Ardennes-Alsace; Central Europe

Commanders
- Notable commanders: Edward Mann Lewis; Troy H. Middleton; Walter Krueger

Insignia
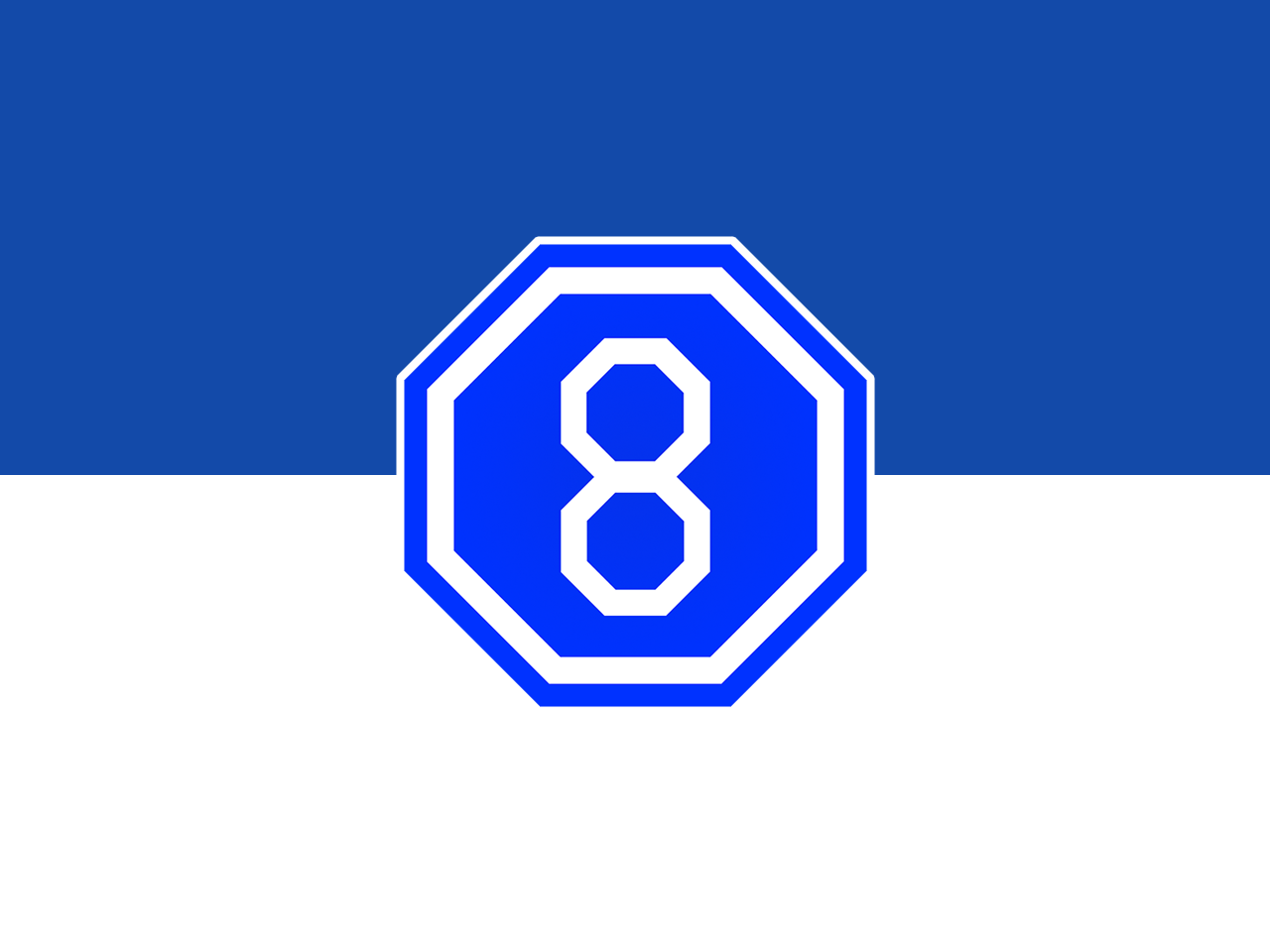
- VIII Corps Flag

The U.S. VIII Corps was a corps of the United States Army that saw service during various times over a fifty-year period during the 20th century. The VIII Corps was organized 26–29 November 1918 in the Regular Army in France and demobilized on 20 April 1919 at Montigny-sur-Aube. The VIII Corps fought across Europe from Normandy to Czechoslovakia in World War II. After World War II, the corps was inactivated and reactivated several times, with the final inactivation occurring in 1968.

== World War I ==
The VIII Corps was first organized in November 1918, with Major General Henry T. Allen designated as commander on 18 November and taking command on 26 November, with the organization of the corps confirmed on 30 November. The corps was used under the Services of Supply, American Expeditionary Forces, to supervise the training areas used by divisions that had just taken part in the Meuse-Argonne offensive. On 20 April 1919, the VIII Corps was discontinued at Montigny-sur-Aube, France, with control of headquarters personnel and corps troops passing to the Services of Supply and other organizations, and the two divisions then assigned (6th and 81st) to the IX Corps.

== Interwar period ==
The VIII Corps was reconstituted in the Organized Reserve on 29 July 1921 as the VIII Corps, allotted to the Eighth Corps Area, and assigned to the Third Army. An oddity was that only the VIII and IX Corps were direct lineal continuations of their World War I counterparts. The corps headquarters was activated on 18 July 1922 at the Maverick Building, San Antonio, Texas, with Regular Army and Organized Reserve personnel. The Headquarters Company was concurrently constituted. The corps headquarters was responsible for providing and planning administration, organization, supply, and training for army, corps, and other nondivisional Reserve units, less field and coast artillery, in the Eighth Corps Area. The headquarters was relieved from active duty on 3 November 1925, and all Regular Army personnel were reassigned to the Headquarters, Field Artillery Group, or to the newly organized Headquarters, Non-Divisional Group, Eighth Corps Area, which assumed most of the responsibilities previously held by the VIII Corps. Both the Headquarters and the Headquarters Company remained active in the Organized Reserve.

Concurrently, all Reserve personnel assigned to Headquarters, VIII Corps, Headquarters Company, VIII Corps, and Headquarters, Special Troops, VIII Corps, were attached to the 90th Division for organization, administration, and control. Reserve personnel assigned to the corps headquarters attended summer training at Fort Sam Houston, Texas. The corps staff conducted staff training with Headquarters, 2nd Division, at Fort Sam Houston 1–15 August 1925, 5–19 January 1926, and 3–17 July 1927. The Headquarters Company conducted training with Headquarters Company, 2nd Division, from 20 July to 2 August 1930.

The corps headquarters and headquarters company were withdrawn from the Organized Reserve on 1 October 1933 and allotted to the Regular Army. Concurrently, the corps headquarters was partially activated at Fort Sam Houston with Regular Army personnel from Headquarters, Eighth Corps Area, and Reserve personnel from the corps area at large. As a "Regular Army Inactive" unit from 1933 to 1940, the corps headquarters was occasionally organized provisionally for short periods using its assigned Reserve officers and staff officers from headquarters, Eighth Corps Area. These periods included several Third Army command post exercises (CPXs) in the 1930s, the Third Army maneuvers at Camp Bullis, Texas, in August 1938, and the 1940 Louisiana maneuvers in the Kisatchie National Forest. The VIII Corps headquarters and headquarters company were fully activated on 14 October 1940, less Reserve personnel, at Fort Sam Houston. At that time, the corps assumed command and control of the 2nd, 36th, and 45th Divisions. The corps headquarters and headquarters company were transferred on 8 March 1941 to Camp Bowie, Texas. During August–October 1941, the VIII Corps participated in the Louisiana Maneuvers as part of the Third Army. After the Louisiana Maneuvers, the corps headquarters returned to Camp Bowie, where it was located on 7 December 1941.

== Normandy ==
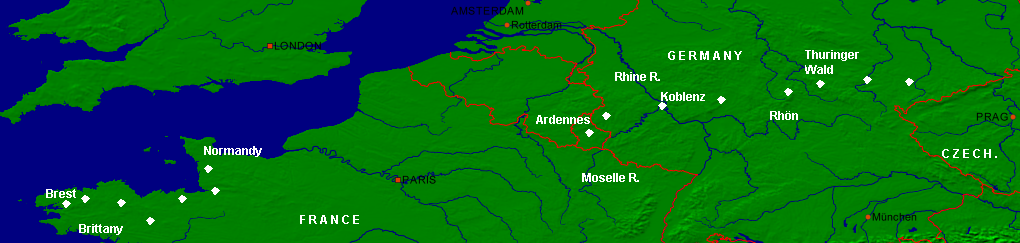
Route of march of the U.S. VIII Corps.

Commanded by Major General Troy H. Middleton, VIII Corps was made operational in Normandy on 15 June 1944, and took up defensive positions west of Carentan on the Cotentin Peninsula as part of the U.S. First Army. Attacking in early July, the corps pushed through bocage country, taking La Haye-du-Puits and the Mont Castre forest. After closing on the Ay and Sèves Rivers, VIII Corps joined the allied breakout from Normandy (Operation Cobra) on 26 July 1944. On 28 July, the corps took the key road junction of Coutances and liberated Avranches two days later.

8th Corp was based in the UK at Camp Burlish aka Camp Bewdley along with 12th Corp. Camp No.2 can still be visited today.

== Brittany ==
In a controversial adherence to the original allied plan for the invasion of Normandy, the U.S. 12th Army Group commander, Lieutenant General Omar N. Bradley, directed VIII Corps westward into Brittany on 1 August 1944, with the object of liberating the Breton ports for Allied use. This decision was later deemed a poor use of the two armored divisions in the corps, which could have been used far more profitably in the rapid allied advance eastward across France. On 7 August 1944, the corps took the port of Saint-Malo. After an involved battle lasting almost six weeks and characterized by urban combat and reduction of fortifications, VIII Corps liberated Brest on 19 September 1944. Ironically, after so much effort, German demolition proved so effective that the liberated Breton ports were unusable for the remainder of the war. See Battle for Brest for more details.

== Ardennes ==
Reorganizing after the operations in Brittany, VIII Corps moved east to join the rest of the allied forces along the border of Germany. Still part of Ninth Army, the corps took over the front in the Ardennes along the Our River and the Schnee Eifel on 4 October 1944. Because this area of the front was so quiet, the corps was used as an orientation and rest area for new U.S. divisions and divisions that had taken heavy casualties while fighting in the Hürtgen Forest. This mission continued until 16 December 1944, when the Germans attacked VIII Corps with over 20 divisions in what came to be known as the Ardennes Offensive, better known as the Battle of the Bulge.

Faced with overwhelming odds, the northern units of the corps, the U.S. 14th Cavalry Group and the U.S. 106th Infantry Division were pushed back or encircled. On the Schnee Eifel, some 6,700 inexperienced soldiers of VIII Corps were taken prisoner by the Germans. Further south, however, other units of the corps conducted a fighting withdrawal that successfully delayed the Germans long enough for the allies to rush reinforcements to the Ardennes. Units of the corps, in particular the U.S. 101st Airborne Division, famously held the key road junction of Bastogne against a five-day German siege that was broken on 26 December 1944, by armored units of the U.S. Third Army advancing from the south. Four days later, VIII Corps counter-attacked toward the town of Houffalize. On 16 January 1945, the corps made contact with the U.S. First Army near Houffalize, effectively pinching off the western end of the "bulge" made in allied lines by the German attacks. The corps reentered Luxembourg on 22 January 1945, and six days later reached the Our River again.

== To the Rhine ==
In the first week of February 1945, the corps again occupied the Schnee Eifel and pushed through the Siegfried Line. VIII Corps took Pruem on 12 February 1945 and then cleared Siegfried Line fortifications in the corps area for the remainder of the month. On 6 March 1945, the corps crossed the Kyll River and reached the Rhine River at Andernach on 9 March 1945. On 16 March 1945, the corps assaulted across the Moselle River near Dieblich, and took Koblenz in a three-day battle that ended on 19 March 1945. Against stiff German resistance, VIII Corps assaulted across the Rhine River at Boppard and pushed eastward into central Germany.

== Final operations ==
Moving north of Frankfurt am Main at the end of March 1945, the corps moved into the Rhön Mountains by early April. In the first two weeks of April 1945, VIII Corps cleared the Thuringian Forest and crossed the Gera, Saale, White Elster, and Mulde rivers in swift succession. By order of the First Army, VIII Corps pulled back to the west side of the Mulde river near the border of Czechoslovakia on 24 April 1945, where the corps was located when Germany surrendered on 8 May 1945.

== Subordination ==
U.S. First Army	15 June 1944 – 31 July 1944
U.S. Third Army	1 August 1944 – 4 September 1944
U.S. Ninth Army	5 September 1944 – 21 October 1944
U.S. First Army	22 October 1944 – 19 December 1944
U.S. Third Army	20 December 1944 – 21 April 1945
U.S. First Army	22 April 1945 – 5 May 1945
U.S. Ninth Army	6 May 1945 – VE Day

== Campaign credits and Inactivation ==
VIII Corps is credited with service in the Normandy, Northern France, Rhineland, Ardennes-Alsace, and Central Europe campaigns. Headquarters, VIII Corps, was inactivated on 15 December 1945, at Camp Gruber, Oklahoma. The corps was subsequently activated 20 November 1957 in Austin, Texas to supervise Reserve training within Fourth Army, and the last inactivation occurred on 1 April 1968.

== Commanders ==
- MG Edward Mann Lewis (December 1922 – January 1924)
- LTG Herbert J. Brees (1 October 1936 – 30 September 1940)
- LTG Walter Krueger (1 October 1940 – May 1941)
- MG George Veazey Strong (May 1941 – 1942)
- LTG Daniel Isom Sultan (1942 – December 1943)
- MG Emil F. Reinhardt (December 1943 – 14 March 1944)
- LTG Troy H. Middleton (15 March 1944 – 10 August 1945)
- MG Ira T. Wyche (10 August 1945 – 15 December 1945)

=== Chiefs of Staff ===
- BG Jay Leland Benedict (November 1940 – September 1941)
- BG Cyrus H. Searcy (1943–1945)

=== Artillery commanders ===
- BG John E. McMahon Jr. (December 1943 – June 1945)
- BG James F. Brittingham (June 1945 – December 1945)
