= Abraham J. Turner =

United States Army officer

- Born: Mount Pleasant, South Carolina
- Military career
- Allegiance: United States of America
- Branch: United States Army
- Service years: 1976-2011
- Rank: Major General
- Conflicts: War in Afghanistan; Iraq War; Gulf War
- Awards: Defense Superior Service Medal; Bronze Star; Legion of Merit

Abraham J. Turner is a retired major general of the United States Army and is the previous executive director for the Department of Employment and Workforce in South Carolina.

== Biography ==
Turner was born and raised in Mount Pleasant, South Carolina, son of Reverend Joseph Turner Sr. and Maggie Turner. He is married to Linda Turner, with three children. One of this children presently attends his parents' alma mater. Turner attended a tribute to Lieutenant General Henry Doctor Jr., alongside Colin Powell in which he spoke of Doctor as "Dad".

After graduating high school he enrolled in the music program at South Carolina State University where he participated in the Reserve Officer Training Corps. After graduating with a Bachelor of Science in Music from South Carolina State University, he accepted a commission into the United States Army as a second lieutenant in 1976. While attending the U.S. Army War College he earned a master's degree in public administration from Shippensburg University.

== Career ==
=== Military ===
Turner was Deputy Chief of Staff, G-3/5/7, U.S. Army Training and Doctrine Command, Fort Monroe, Virginia. Prior to this he served as Commanding General, U.S. Army Training Center and Fort Jackson, Ft. Jackson, South Carolina, assistant Chief of Staff, C-3, Coalition Forces Land Component Command, Camp Doha, Kuwait, assistant Division Commander (Operations), 82d Airborne Division, Fort Bragg, North Carolina, and Chief, House Legislative Liaison Division, Office of the Chief, Legislative Liaison, U.S. Army, Washington, D.C. As Commander of Fort Jackson, Turner added a flag from a World War I African-American regiment to the museum.

Turner's combat experiences include a combat jump into Panama during Operation Just Cause, a deployment during Operations Desert Shield, and deployments in support of Operations Iraqi Freedom and Enduring Freedom.

In 2009, General Turner served as the program keynote speaker and presented eighteen-year-old Kambrell H. Garvin with the Millennium Magazine "Celebrating Your Gifts Award". Garvin was elected to lead the South Carolina NAACP Youth and College Division.

He was the principal adviser to the commander and deputy commander, United States Strategic Command, and directs the activities of the command staff by developing and implementing policies and procedures in support of the command's missions. He chairs numerous boards, oversees the command corporate process, and serves as director of the commander's staff.

=== Post-military ===
Formerly, Turner was appointed by Nikki Haley to be the Executive Director of the Department of Employment and Workforce in South Carolina. February 15, 2013, he resigned for "personal reasons".

In 2012 Turner served as a panelist for the Tuskegee Airman join Black History Month symposium, themed, "Hometown Heroes: The Struggles and Accomplishments of Black Veterans".

Currently, the retired General is CEO of AT Consulting LLC and is the Chairman of the SYC board of directors. He is also a member of Governor Nikki Haley's Original Six Foundation.

He will be speaking at the citadel on March 16, 2021.

== Honors, awards, and decorations ==
Among his awards and decorations, Turner has been awarded the Defense Superior Service Medal, Legion of Merit with two oak leaf clusters, Bronze Star Medal with oak leaf cluster, Defense Meritorious Service Medal, and Meritorious Service Medal with three oak leaf clusters.

- Defense Superior Service Medal
- Legion of Merit with oak leaf cluster
- Bronze Star with oak leaf cluster
- Defense Meritorious Service Medal
- Meritorious Service Medal with three oak leaf clusters
- Army Commendation Medal with oak leaf cluster
- Army Achievement Medal with oak leaf cluster

=== Highway naming ===
On March 27, 2008, a bill was introduced in the South Carolina Senate to rename a portion of Highway 41 in Charleston County the "Major General Abraham J. Turner Highway".
