= General Peterson =

General Peterson may refer to:

- Chesley G. Peterson (1920–1990), U.S. Air Force major general
- Erik C. Peterson (general) (fl. 1980s–2020s), U.S. Army lieutenant general
- Virgil L. Peterson (1882–1956), U.S. Army major general

== See also ==
- General Petersen (disambiguation)
- Attorney General Peterson (disambiguation)
