= General Petersen =

General Petersen may refer to:

- Daniel Frederik Petersen (1757–1816), Norwegian Army major general
- Erich Petersen (1889–1963), German Luftwaffe general
- Frank E. Petersen (1932–2015), U.S. Marine Corps lieutenant general

== See also ==
- General Peterson (disambiguation)
