= Ronald H. Griffith =

United States Army general (1936–2018)

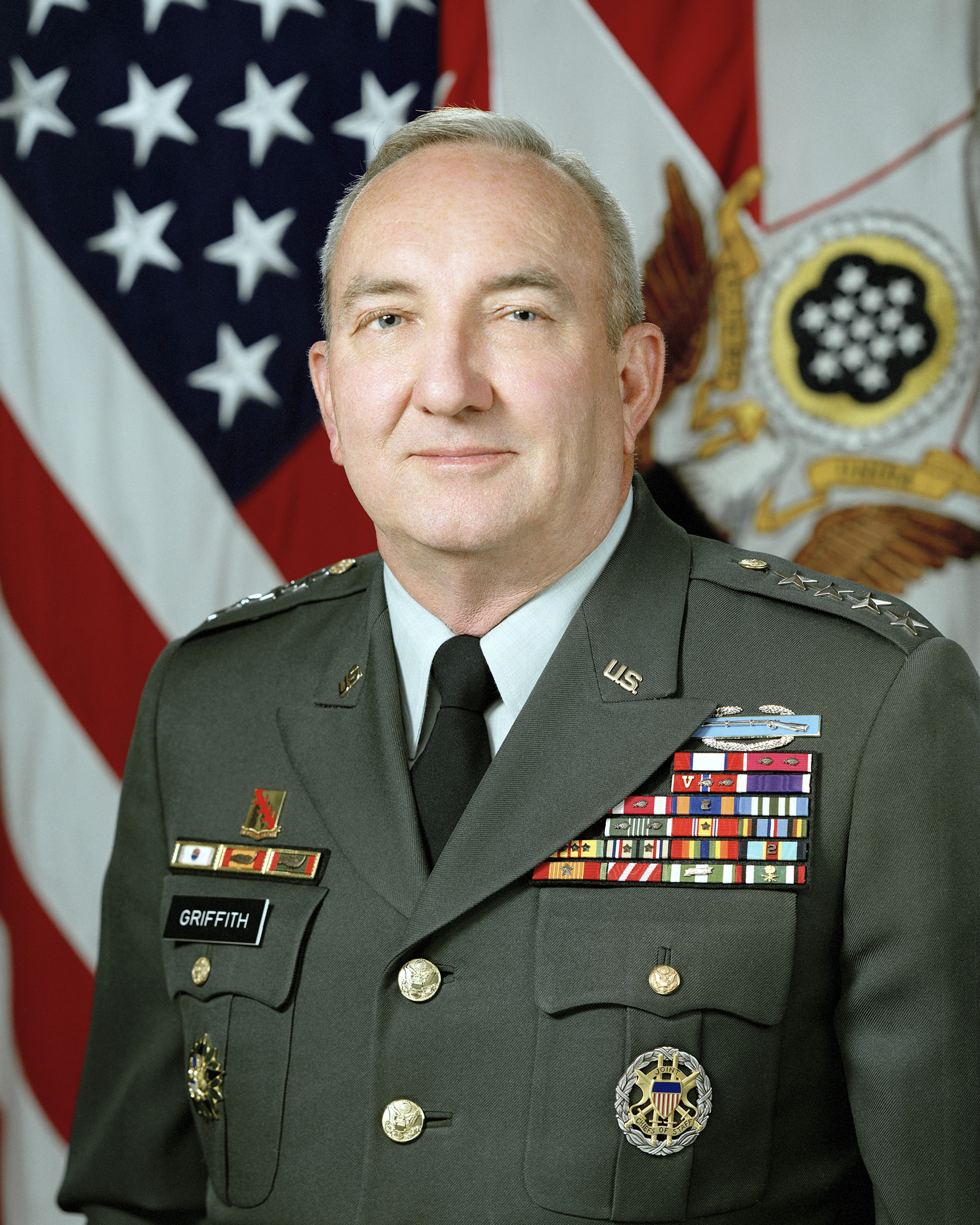
- General Ronald H. Griffith
- Born: 16 March 1936; Lafayette, Georgia, U.S.
- Died: 18 July 2018 (aged 82); Arlington, Virginia, U.S.
- Military career
- Allegiance: United States of America
- Branch: United States Army
- Service years: 1960–1997
- Rank: General
- Commands: 1st Armored Division
- Conflicts: Vietnam War; Gulf War
- Awards: Legion of Merit (3); Bronze Star (7); Purple Heart
- Other work: Vice President, Military Professional Resources

Ronald Houston Griffith (16 March 1936 – 18 July 2018) was an American general in the United States Army who served as Vice Chief of Staff of the United States Army (VCSA) from 1995 to 1997. He was born in Lafayette, Georgia.

== Military career ==
Griffith was from North Georgia, and was commissioned as a second lieutenant in the United States Army in 1960 after having graduated from the University of Georgia with a Bachelor of Science degree.

He was a Vietnam War veteran, having served as an infantry unit advisor to the Army of the Republic of Vietnam from 1964 to 1965 and later as Executive Officer of the 2nd Battalion, 8th Infantry Regiment, 4th Infantry Division from 1969 to 1970.

Griffith's commands included 1st Battalion, 32nd Armor in Germany, 1st Brigade, 2nd Infantry Division in Korea, and 1st Armored Division which he commanded in Germany and during Operations Desert Shield and Desert Storm. His staff positions at the Department of the Army level include executive officer to the Deputy Chief of Staff of the Army for Operations and Plans; chief of the War Plans Division; deputy director of operations, the Inspector General of the Army, and Vice Chief of Staff of the Army. He also served as the chief of staff, and later as the assistant division commander of the 1st Cavalry Division at Fort Hood, Texas. Griffith retired from the Army on 1 November 1997.

His awards and decorations included the Defense Distinguished Service Medal, the Army Distinguished Service Medal with oak leaf cluster, the Legion of Merit with 2 oak leaf clusters, the Bronze Star with "V" device and 6 oak leaf clusters, the Purple Heart, the Combat Infantry Badge, the Joint Chiefs of Staff Identification Badge, and the Army Staff Identification Badge. Griffith also received a number of foreign decorations which included, the Vietnamese Cross of Gallantry with Silver Star, the German Army Cross of Honor (Gold Class) and the Order of May for Military Merit (Grand Cross) from Argentina. He holds a master's degree in public administration from Shippensburg University. His military education included the Armor Officer Advanced Course, the Command and General Staff College, and the Army War College. He also studied French and German at the Defense Language Institute.

== Post military ==
After retiring from the military, Griffith became Executive Vice President of Military Professional Resources Inc. (MPRI) and later he was selected to serve as Executive Vice President of the L-3 Communications Government Services Group. He retired from these positions in 2010. For eight years he served on the Board of Visitors of the Virginia Military Institute, completing tenure in this position in 2011. General Griffith served as a member of the Board of Regents of the Uniformed Services University of the Health Sciences and is on the Board of the Aurora Foundation. Griffith's wife, Hurdis M. Griffith, is Dean Emeritus of the College of Nursing, Rutgers University. Together they had two adult daughters and five grandchildren. He died in his sleep on 18 July 2018.

Military offices
Preceded by Gen. John H. Tilelli, Jr.	Vice Chief of Staff of the United States Army; 1995 – 1997	Succeeded by Gen. William W. Crouch
Preceded by Lt Gen. Johnnie H. Corns	Inspector General of the United States Army; 1991 – 1996	Succeeded by Lt Gen. Larry R. Jordan
