= Attorney General Peterson =

Attorney General Peterson may refer to:

- Arthur P. Peterson (1858–1895), Attorney General of the Kingdom of Hawaii
- Doug Peterson (Nebraska politician) (born 1959), Attorney General of Nebraska
- Harry H. Peterson (1890–1985), Attorney General of Minnesota
- K. Berry Peterson (1881–1952), Attorney General of Arizona
- Leslie Peterson (politician) (1923–2015), Attorney General of British Columbia

== See also ==
- General Peterson (disambiguation)
