= Augustus De Butts =

British Army general

General Sir Augustus De Butts KCH
- Born: 1770; County Kerry, Ireland
- Died: 28 November 1853 (aged 82–83); London, United Kingdom
- Education: Royal Military Academy, Woolwich
- Military career
- Allegiance: United Kingdom
- Branch: Royal Engineers
- Service years: 1788–1853
- Rank: General
- Conflicts: French Revolutionary Wars; Siege of Toulon; Siege of Bastia; Siege of Calvi

General Sir Augustus De Butts KCH (1770 – 28 November 1853) was an officer in the Royal Engineers. De Butts served during the French Revolutionary Wars, fighting in the Siege of Toulon, the Siege of Bastia, and the Siege of Calvi.

== Biography ==
=== Early life ===
He was the fourth son of Elias De Butts and was born in Ireland in 1770.

=== Military service ===
He joined the Royal Engineers on 21 November 1792 as a first lieutenant. He became a captain on 3 March 1797. He served at the sieges of Toulon, Bastia and Calvi and was favourably mentioned in the despatches of Lord Hood after the surrender of Bastia. At Bastia, de Butts and Royal Artillery Lieutenant John Duncan were asked by Horatio Nelson to help him examine a landing site. On 1 July 1806, De Butts was promoted to lieutenant colonel. He became a colonel in the army on 4 June 1814 and in the Royal Engineers on 20 December. For some years, he commanded the Royal Engineers in Jersey. He was promoted to the rank of major general in 1821 and was appointed colonel commandant of the Royal Engineers in 1827. He lived in London. He was made a Knight Commander of the Royal Guelphic Order in 1837 and made a lieutenant general. De Butts was made a general in 1851. De Butts died on 28 November 1853.

=== Personal life ===
He married Anna Maria Minchin in 1804 and had 12 children, including Major General John Cromie Blackwood De Butts RE. He was the elder brother of Henry De Butts. His great great grandson was Brigadier Frederick Manus De Butts CMG OBE DL
