= Thomas Humphrey Cushing =

Officer in the US Army

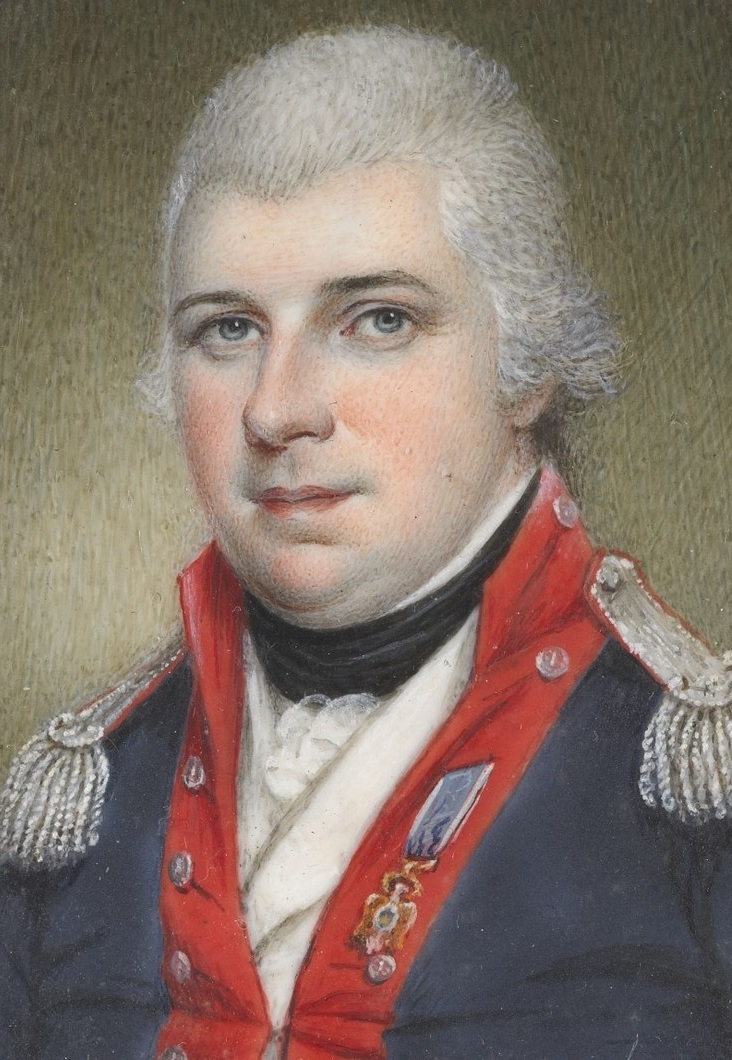
- Born: December 20, 1755; Pembroke, Massachusetts
- Died: October 19, 1822 (aged 66); New London, Connecticut
- Burial place: Cedar Grove Cemetery, New London, Connecticut
- Military career
- Allegiance: United States of America
- Branch: Continental Army; United States Army
- Service years: 1776–1784, 1791–1815
- Rank: Brigadier General
- Commands: 2nd Infantry Regiment; Adjutant General of the U.S. Army; Inspector General of the U.S. Army; Military District Number 1
- Conflicts: American Revolutionary War; War of 1812

Thomas Humphrey Cushing (December 20, 1755 – October 19, 1822) was an American military officer in the Continental Army, and later the United States Army. A veteran of the American Revolutionary War and the War of 1812, he attained the rank of brigadier general. He later served as collector of customs for the Port of New London, Connecticut.

== Early life ==
Thomas H. Cushing was born in Pembroke, Massachusetts on December 20, 1755, a son of Nehemiah Cushing (1721–1762) and Sarah (Humphrey) Cushing (1722–1804). Nehemiah Cushing was serving as a captain in the Massachusetts Militia during the French and Indian War when he died at Crown Point, New York. Sarah Humphrey Cushing married Isaac Hatch in 1763; according to local lore, she attended the ceremony clad in a petticoat to take advantage of an English custom, "smock marriage," by which a widow indicated she brought no property into her new marriage. A smock marriage prevented creditors from attempting to collect the deceased husband's debts from the widow or her new husband; according to the Cushing family historian, Sarah Cushing maintained her modesty by wearing her petticoat over her dress. Cushing was raised and educated in Pembroke, then supported the Patriot side in the American Revolution by joining the Continental Army.

== American Revolution ==
Cushing began his military career as a sergeant in the 6th Continental Regiment in January 1776. He was commissioned a second lieutenant in the 1st Massachusetts Regiment in January 1777 and was promoted to first lieutenant in January 1778. He was taken prisoner in May 1781 and was later exchanged. He received a brevet promotion to captain in September 1783. Cushing was admitted to the Society of the Cincinnati as an original member later that year.

Following the British evacuation of New York City in November 1783, the bulk of the Continental Army was discharged. Cushing was retained in Jackson's Continental Regiment, commanded by Brevet Brigadier General Henry Jackson, and was one of the last officers to be discharged from the Continental Army when the regiment was disbanded on June 20, 1784.

== Later career ==
On March 4, 1791, Cushing was commissioned a captain in the 2nd Infantry Regiment. On March 3, 1793, he was commissioned as a major in the 1st Sublegion (later re-designated as the 1st Infantry Regiment).

From February 27, 1797, to May 22, 1798, he served as Adjutant and Inspector General of the Army. (Note: From 1792 to 1821 the offices of Adjutant General and Inspector General were combined.) In 1799, he commissioned artist James Peale to create a miniature portrait of himself. On June 15, 1800, he was re-appointed as Adjutant and Inspector General and held the office until April 2, 1807. From 1800 to 1807 he resided in Washington, D.C.

Cushing was promoted to lieutenant colonel of the 2nd Infantry on April 1, 1802. He was promoted to colonel of the same regiment on September 7, 1805. He was James Wilkinson's aide during the Sabine crisis in 1806 and thus helped him negotiate the Neutral Ground pact.

In early 1811, Cushing was arrested on the order of Brigadier General Wade Hampton I and court-martialed on charges of disobedience to orders and misuse of government funds. The court first met on April 26, 1811, in Baton Rouge, Louisiana and was presided over by Colonel Alexander Smyth, with Winfield Scott appointed as the judge advocate (prosecutor). The trial lasted over a year and on May 5, 1812, Cushing was acquitted of most charges, and received only a written reprimand for the minor charges of which he was convicted.

== War of 1812 ==
Cushing was promoted to the rank of brigadier general on July 2, 1812. During the War of 1812, he served as Adjutant General of the Army from July 6, 1812, to March 12, 1813. He was then assigned as commander of Military District Number 1 (consisting of the states of Massachusetts and New Hampshire) with his headquarters at Boston.

After the war's end, he retired from the Army on June 15, 1815.

== Later life ==
In January 1816 Cushing was appointed collector of customs for the port of New London, Connecticut, succeeding Jedediah Huntington.

In 1817, Cushing fought a duel with Virginia congressman William J. Lewis and was saved when the bullet struck his watch. The two resolved their differences, and Lewis, stepping up to the general, said: "I congratulate you, general, on having a watch that will keep time from eternity."

Cushing died in New London in 1822. He was originally buried in the Second Burial Ground in New London but his remains were later relocated to the Cedar Grove Cemetery in the same city.

== Dates of rank ==
- Sergeant, 6th Continental Infantry - 1 January 1776
- 2nd Lieutenant, 1st Massachusetts Regiment - 1 January 1777
- 1st Lieutenant, 1st Massachusetts Regiment - 12 January 1778
- Brevet Captain - 30 September 1783
- 1st Lieutenant, Jackson's Continental Regiment - November 1783
- Discharged - 20 June 1784
- Captain, 2nd Infantry - 4 March 1791
- Captain, 2nd Sub-Legion - 4 September 1792
- Major, 1st Sub-Legion - 3 March 1793
- Major, 1st Infantry - 1 November 1796
- Lieutenant Colonel, 2nd Infantry - 1 April 1802
- Colonel, 2nd Infantry - 7 September 1805
- Brigadier General, United States Army - 2 July 1812
- Retired - 15 June 1815

== See also ==
- List of Adjutant Generals of the U.S. Army
- List of Inspectors General of the U.S. Army

== Sources ==
- Drake, Francis S. (1873). Memorials of the Society of the Cincinnati of Massachusetts. Boston: Society of the Cincinnati of Massachusetts. p. 271.
- Wilson, J. G.; Fiske, J., eds. (1900). "Cushing, Thomas Humphrey" . Appletons' Cyclopædia of American Biography. New York: D. Appleton.
- Carl Russell Fish (1905). The Civil Service and the Patronage. New York: Longmans, Green, and Co. pp. 54–55.

Military offices
Preceded by Edward Butler (acting)	Adjutant General of the U. S. Army; February 27, 1797 – July 19, 1798 (acting)	Succeeded by William North
Preceded by William North	Adjutant General of the U. S. Army; June 15, 1800 – April 2, 1807	Succeeded by Abimael Y. Nicoll (acting)
Preceded by Alexander Macomb (acting)	Adjutant General of the U. S. Army; July 6, 1812 – March 12, 1813	Succeeded by Zebulon Pike
Preceded by Edward Butler (acting)	Inspector General of the U.S. Army; February 27, 1797 – July 18, 1798 (acting)	Succeeded by Alexander Hamilton
Preceded by Alexander Hamilton	Inspector General of the U.S. Army; June 15, 1800 – April 2, 1807 (acting)	Succeeded by Abimael Y. Nicoll (acting)
