= John Mills (soldier) =

U.S. Army officer (1754–1796)

- Born: 22 December 1754; Boston, Massachusetts
- Died: 8 July 1796 (aged 41); Fort Greenville, Ohio
- Military career
- Allegiance: United States
- Branch: United States Army
- Service years: 1775–1784; 1791–1796
- Rank: Major
- Commands: Adjutant General of the U.S. Army; Inspector General of the U.S. Army
- Conflicts: American Revolutionary War; Siege of Boston; Battle of Saratoga; Battle of Monmouth; Northwest Indian War

John Mills (22 December 1754 – 8 July 1796) was an American military officer who served as acting Adjutant General and acting Inspector General of the U.S. Army from 1794 to 1796.

== Biography ==
Mills was born on 22 December 1754, in Boston, Massachusetts. He served in the U.S. Army, fighting in the American Revolutionary War and the Northwest Indian War. He held the rank of major.

He died 8 July 1796, in Fort Greenville, Ohio.

== See also ==
- List of Adjutants General of the U.S. Army
- List of Inspectors General of the U.S. Army

Military offices
Preceded by Edward Butler (acting)	Adjutant General of the U. S. Army; May 13, 1794 – February 27, 1796 (acting)	Succeeded by Jonathan Haskell (acting)
Preceded by Edward Butler (acting)	Inspector General of the U.S. Army; May 13, 1794 – February 27, 1796 (acting)	Succeeded by Jonathan Haskell (acting)
