= List of inspectors general of the United States Army =

Inspector General of the United States Army
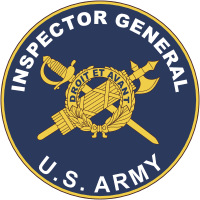
- Seal of the inspector general

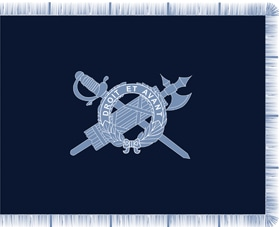
- Flag of the inspector general

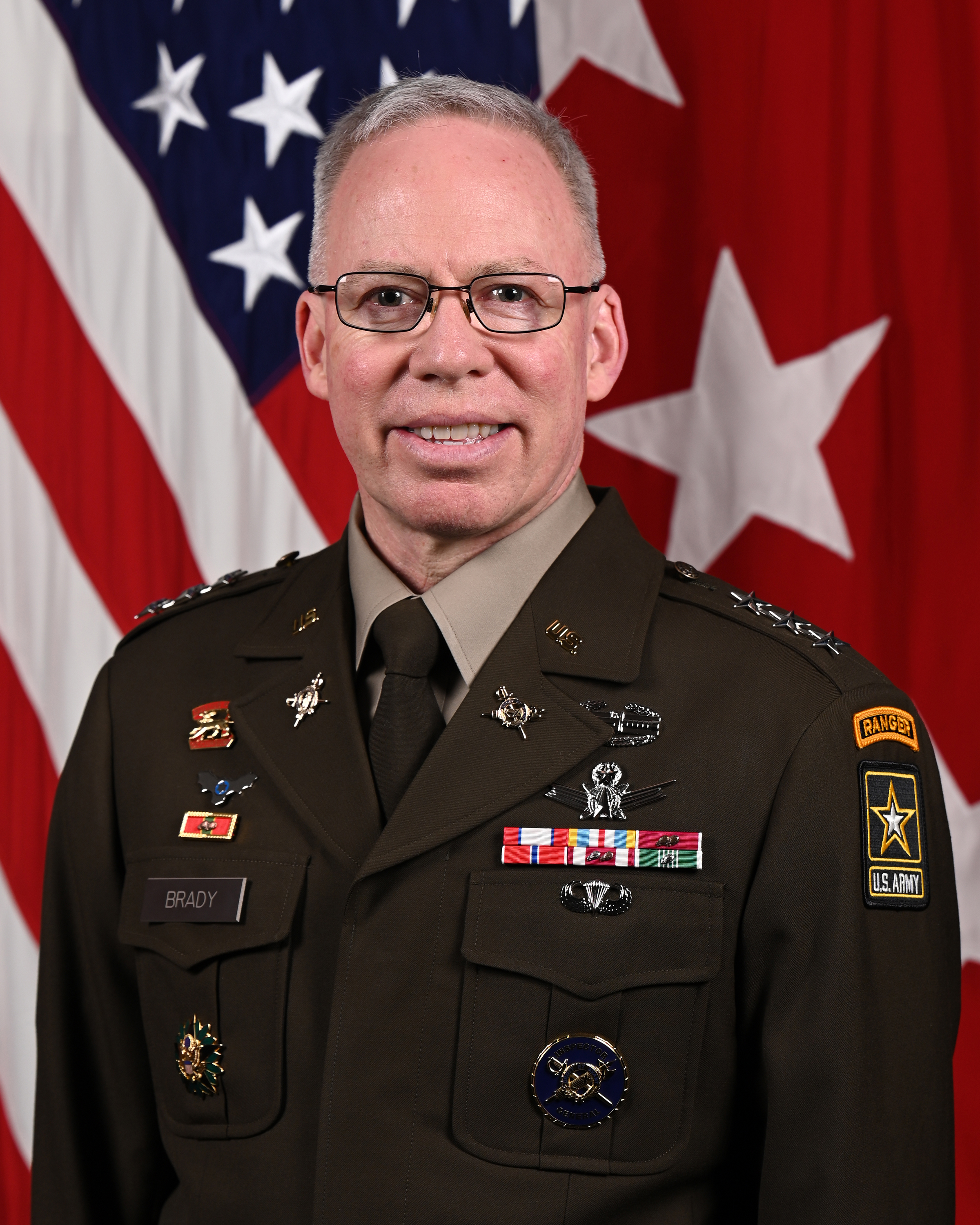
- Incumbent; LTG Gregory Brady since March 17, 2025
- Department of the Army
- Type: Inspector general
- Abbreviation: IG
- Member of: Office of the Inspector General, U.S. Department of Defense
- Reports to: Secretary of the Army; Chief of Staff of the Army
- Seat: The Pentagon, Arlington, Virginia
- Appointer: The president; with Senate advice and consent
- Term length: 4 years
- Constituting instrument: 10 U.S.C. § 7020
- Precursor: Inspector-General of the Cavalry of the United States of America
- Inaugural holder: Thomas Conway
- Formation: December 13, 1777
- Deputy: Deputy, The Inspector General
- Website: https://ig.army.mil

The inspector general of the United States Army serves to "provide impartial, objective and unbiased advice and oversight to the Army through relevant, timely and thorough inspection, assistance, investigations, and training." The Inspector General has historically been a high-ranking Army official before their appointment to the position. Since 1973, the position has been a lieutenant general billet.

== List ==
No.	Image	Rank	Name	Begin date	End date	ref(s)
1		Colonel	Augustin de La Balme	July 8, 1777	February 13, 1778	(Note: Inspector General of Cavalry)
2		Major General	Philippe Charles Tronson du Coudray	August 11, 1777	September 15, 1777	(Note: Inspector General of Ordnance and Military Stores)
3	Thomas Conway	Major General	Thomas Conway	December 13, 1777	April 28, 1778	
4	Frederick von Steuben	Major General	Friedrich Wilhelm von Steuben	March 28, 1778	April 15, 1784	
5	William North	Major	William North	April 17, 1784	October 28, 1787	
6		Lieutenant	Henry De Butts; Acting	March 10, 1792	February 23, 1793	
7		Major	Michael Rudolph; Acting	February 23, 1793	July 17, 1793	
8	Edward Butler	Captain	Edward Butler; Acting	July 18, 1793	May 13, 1794	
9		Major	John Mills; Acting	May 13, 1794	February 27, 1796	
10	Jonathan Haskell	Major	Jonathan Haskell; Acting	February 27, 1796	August 1, 1796	
11	Edward Butler	Captain	Edward Butler; Acting	August 1, 1796	February 27, 1797	
12		Major	Thomas Humphrey Cushing; Acting	February 27, 1797	July 18, 1798	
13	Alexander Hamilton	Major General	Alexander Hamilton	July 18, 1798	June 15, 1800	
14		Colonel	Thomas Humphrey Cushing; Acting	June 15, 1800	April 2, 1807	
15		Major	Abimael Youngs Nicoll; Acting	April 2, 1807	April 28, 1812	
16		Brigadier General	Alexander Smyth	July 6, 1812	March 3, 1813	
17	Zebulon Pike	Brigadier General	Zebulon Pike	March 12, 1813	April 27, 1813	(Note: Killed in Action at the Battle of York, War of 1812)
Vacant				April 27, 1813	May 9, 1814	
–	William H. Winder	Brigadier General	William H. Winder	May 9, 1814	July 2, 1814	
Vacant				July 2, 1814	November 22, 1814	
–	Daniel Parker	Brigadier General	Daniel Parker	November 22, 1814	June 1, 1821	
Vacant				June 2, 1821	May 13, 1861	
–		Colonel	Henry Lee Scott	May 14, 1861	September 24, 1861	
22	Randolph B. Marcy	Brigadier General	Randolph B. Marcy	September 25, 1861	January 2, 1881	
23	Delos B. Sacket	Brigadier General	Delos Bennett Sackett	January 2, 1881	March 8, 1885	
24	Nelson H. Davis	Brigadier General	Nelson H. Davis	March 11, 1885	September 20, 1885	
25	Absalom Baird	Brigadier General	Absalom Baird	September 20, 1885	August 20, 1888	
26	Roger Jones	Brigadier General	Roger Jones	August 20, 1888	January 26, 1889	
27	Joseph C. Breckinridge	Brigadier General	Joseph C. Breckinridge	January 30, 1889	April 11, 1903	
28		Brigadier General	Peter D. Vroom	April 12, 1903	April 12, 1903	
29	George H. Burton	Brigadier General	George H. Burton	April 12, 1903	September 30, 1906	
30	Ernest A. Garlington	Brigadier General	Ernest Albert Garlington	October 1, 1906	February 20, 1917	
31	John L. Chamberlain	Major General	John L. Chamberlain	February 21, 1917	November 6, 1921	
32	Eli A. Helmick	Major General	Eli Alva Helmick	November 7, 1921	September 27, 1927	
33	William C. Rivers	Major General	William C. Rivers	September 28, 1927	January 11, 1930	
34	Hugh A. Drum	Major General	Hugh A. Drum	January 12, 1930	November 30, 1931	
35	John F. Preston	Major General	John F. Preston	December 1, 1931	November 30, 1935	
36	Walter L. Reed	Major General	Walter L. Reed	December 1, 1935	December 23, 1939	
37	Virgil L. Peterson	Major General	Virgil L. Peterson	December 24, 1939	June 5, 1945	
38	Daniel I. Sultan	Lieutenant General	Daniel I. Sultan	July 14, 1945	January 14, 1947	
39	Ira T. Wyche	Major General	Ira T. Wyche	January 30, 1947	June 30, 1948	
40	Louis A. Craig	Major General	Louis A. Craig	July 1, 1948	May 31, 1952	
41	Daniel Noce	Lieutenant General	Daniel Noce	June 1, 1952	October 31, 1954	
42	Wayne C. Zimmerman	Major General	Wayne C. Zimmerman	November 1, 1954	January 31, 1956	
43	David Ayres Depue Ogden	Lieutenant General	David Ayres Depue Ogden	February 1, 1956	October 31, 1957	
44	Albert Pierson	Major General	Albert Pierson	November 1, 1957	July 31, 1959	
45		Major General	Edward H. McDaniel	August 1, 1959	November 30, 1963	
46	Hiram D. Ives		Hiram D. Ives	December 1, 1963	September 30, 1965	
47			James A. Richardson III	December 1, 1965	October 31, 1966	
48	William C. Garrison		William C. Garrison	November 1, 1966	July 31, 1968	
49	William A. Enemark	Major General	William A. Enemark	August 1, 1968	1972	
50	Gilbert H. Woodward	Lieutenant General	Gilbert H. Woodward	June 1973	October 17, 1973	
51	Herron N. Maples	Lieutenant General	Herron N. Maples	March 4, 1974	October 31, 1976	
52	Marvin D. Fuller	Lieutenant General	Marvin D. Fuller	November 1, 1976	1977	
53	Richard Trefry	Lieutenant General	Richard Trefry	1977	1983	
54		Lieutenant General	Nathaniel R. Thompson Jr.	1983	June 1986	
55	Henry Doctor Jr	Lieutenant General	Henry Doctor Jr.	June 1986	1989	
56	Johnnie H. Corns	Lieutenant General	Johnnie H. Corns	December 1989	July 1991	
57	Ronald H. Griffith	Lieutenant General	Ronald H. Griffith	1991	1995	
58	Jared L. Bates	Lieutenant General	Jared L. Bates	1995	1997	
59	Larry R. Jordan	Lieutenant General	Larry R. Jordan	1997	1999	
60	Michael W. Ackerman	Lieutenant General	Michael W. Ackerman	1999	2002	
61	Paul T. Mikolashek	Lieutenant General	Paul T. Mikolashek	2002	2005	
62	Stanley E. Green	Lieutenant General	Stanley E. Green	March 2005	February 2008	
63	R. Steven Whitcomb	Lieutenant General	R. Steven Whitcomb	February 14, 2008	August 13, 2010	
64	Peter M. Vangjel	Lieutenant General	Peter M. Vangjel	November 14, 2011	December 2014	
65	David Quantock	Lieutenant General	David E. Quantock	December 2014	December 2017	
66	Leslie Smith	Lieutenant General	Leslie C. Smith	February 7, 2018	September 1, 2021	
67	Donna Martin	Lieutenant General	Donna W. Martin	September 2, 2021	March 7, 2025	
68	Gregory Brady	Lieutenant General	Gregory Brady	March 17, 2025	present	
