= Michael Rudolph =

Acting Adjutant General and acting Inspector General of the U.S. Army in 1793

- Born: 1758; Elkton, Maryland
- Died: 1795 (aged 36–37) at sea
- Military career
- Allegiance: United States of America
- Branch: United States Army
- Service years: 1778–1783, 1790–1793
- Rank: Major
- Commands: Adjutant General of the U.S. Army; Inspector General of the U.S. Army
- Conflicts: American Revolutionary War; Battle of Paulus Hook; Battle of Guilford Court House; Siege of Ninety-Six; Battle of Eutaw Springs; Northwest Indian War; Harmar Campaign

Michael Rudolph (1758–1795) was an American military officer who served as acting Adjutant General and acting Inspector General of the U.S. Army in 1793.

== Background ==
Rudolph was born in Elkton, Maryland of parents of German descent, and received no formal education. In April 1778, at around the age of twenty, he enlisted in Lee's Legion, where he served for the duration of the American Revolutionary War. He was commissioned a lieutenant in July 1779, and in September 1779 was brevetted a captain for his actions in the Battle of Paulus Hook. He was discharged at the conclusion of the war and returned to civilian life.

== Final years and death ==
He returned to the Army in June 1790, as a captain in the 1st U.S. Infantry He was promoted to major commanding the Squadron of Light Dragoons in March 1792. In February 1793, he was made acting Adjutant General and acting Inspector General of the U.S. Army. Shortly afterward, he was given command of Fort Hamilton, Ohio. There, he refused to postpone the execution of several soldiers for desertion even though he knew an appeal of their case was pending. Moments after the execution was carried out, a messenger arrived with orders reprieving some of the executed men. The execution infuriated Rudolph's commander, General Anthony Wayne, who ordered Rudolph's resignation in July 1793. Accounts say he returned home to find his wife had been unfaithful, and went to sea to seek his fortune, where he was captured and killed by pirates.

A legend which circulated in the mid-19th century had Rudolph making his way to France, where he became the military commander Michel Ney.

== See also ==
- List of Adjutant Generals of the U.S. Army
- List of Inspectors General of the U.S. Army
- The American Revolution Institute
- The Society of the Cincinnati

Military offices
Preceded by Henry De Butts (acting)	Adjutant General of the U. S. Army; February 23, 1793 – July 17, 1793 (acting)	Succeeded by Edward Butler (acting)
Preceded by Henry De Butts (acting)	Inspector General of the U.S. Army; February 23, 1793 – July 17, 1793 (acting)	Succeeded by Edward Butler (acting)
