= William A. Enemark =

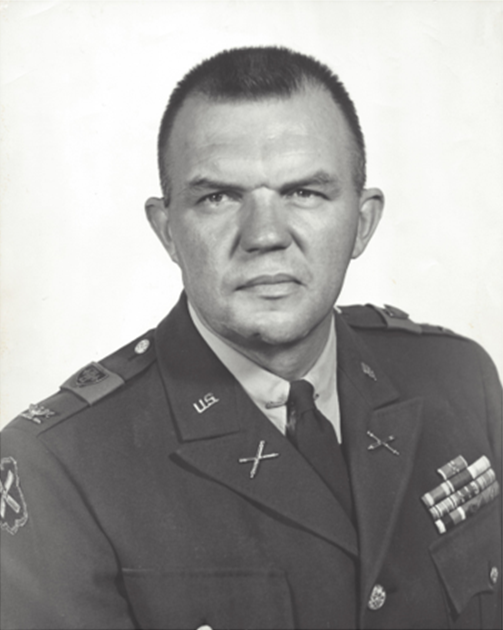
- Enemark as commandant of Fort Sill Officer Candidate School c. 1954
- Born: August 23, 1913; San Francisco, California, U.S.
- Died: April 17, 2016 (aged 102); Washington, D.C., U.S.
- Burial place: Arlington National Cemetery
- Military career
- Allegiance: United States
- Branch: United States Army
- Service years: 1937–1972
- Rank: Major general
- Commands: 7th Infantry Division

William Andrew Enemark (August 23, 1913 – April 17, 2016) was a major general in the United States Army. He served as Inspector General of the U.S. Army from 1968 to 1972.
