= Ira T. Wyche =

Career US Army officer, served as Inspector General

Ira Thomas Wyche
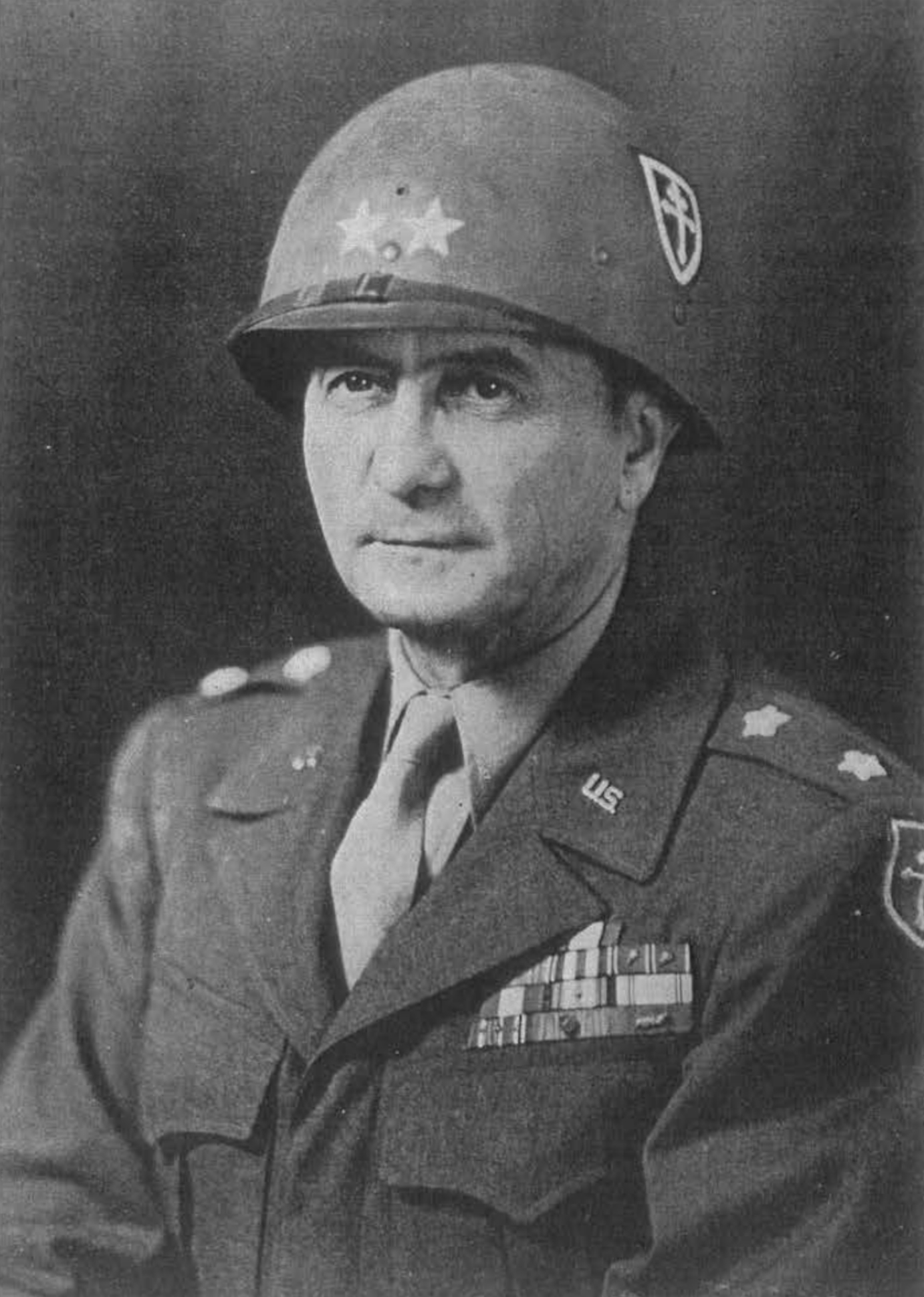
- Wyche as 79th Infantry Division commander c. 1945
- Born: 16 October 1887; Ocracoke Island, North Carolina, United States
- Died: 8 July 1981 (aged 93); Buncombe County, North Carolina, United States
- Burial place: Fort Bragg Main Post Cemetery, United States
- Military career
- Allegiance: United States Army
- Branch: United States
- Service years: 1907–1948
- Rank: Major General
- Nicknames: "Papa" "Doughboy's General"
- Service number: 0-3112
- Unit: Infantry Branch
- Commands: Inspector General of the United States Army; III Corps; VIII Corps; 79th Infantry Division; 74th Field Artillery Brigade; 2nd Battalion, 4th Field Artillery Regiment; 1st Battalion, 14th Field Artillery Regiment; 2nd Battalion, 1st Field Artillery Regiment
- Conflicts: World War I World War II
- Awards: Army Distinguished Service Medal; Silver Star; Legion of Merit

Major General Ira Thomas Wyche (16 October 1887 – 8 July 1981) was a career officer in the United States Army who ultimately became Inspector General of the United States Army. A graduate of the United States Military Academy at West Point, during World War I he served in the American Expeditionary Forces (AEF) on the Western Front, and returned to the United States to train artillery students. He spent time teaching and attending various army schools from 1918 to 1942; including the United States Army Command and General Staff College and United States Army War College.

In May 1942, during World War II, he took command of the 79th Infantry Division. He led the division in the Normandy landings, and oversaw many of its battles until May 1945. After World War II ended, Wyche took command of VIII Corps. He would later serve on the Officer Interview Board and command III Corps and 1st Service Command. He served as Inspector General of the Army from January 1947 to September 1948, during which he investigated charges that John C. H. Lee misused enlisted men under his command in occupied Italy. Wyche retired from the army in September 1948, and moved to Pinehurst, North Carolina.

== Early life ==
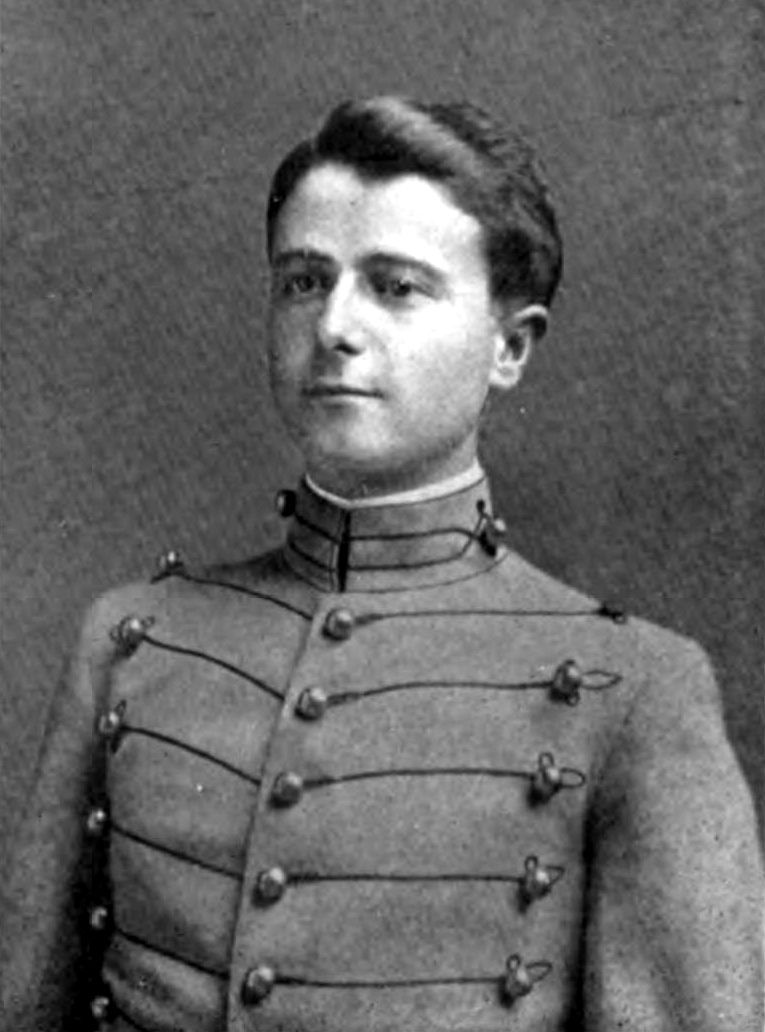
At West Point in 1911

Wyche was born on 16 October 1887, on Ocracoke Island, North Carolina, the son of Lawrence Olin Wyche and his wife Lorena née Howard. Lawrence was the pastor of the Methodist church on Ocracoke. Wyche attended the Quackenbush School in Laurinburg, North Carolina. He received an appointment to the United States Military Academy in West Point, New York.

Wyche entered the Military Academy on 15 June 1907. He graduated on 13 June 1911, 68th in his class of 82. Upon graduating, he received a commission as second lieutenant in the 30th Infantry Regiment. His classmates included John P. Lucas, Frederick Gilbreath, Alexander Surles, Thompson Lawrence, Charles P. Hall, Joseph Cowles Mehaffey, Jesse A. Ladd, Gustave H. Franke, James R.N. Weaver, Herbert Dargue, Philip Bracken Fleming, Harold F. Nichols, Karl Slaughter Bradford, Raymond Albert Wheeler, John R. Homer, Paul W. Baade, and William Henry Harrison Morris Jr.

== Military career ==
=== Early military career ===
Wyche served from September 1911 to February 1912 at Fort Mason, in California, before he was transferred to the Presidio of Monterey in California. He returned to Fort Mason from May to June. After leaving Fort Mason, he traveled to Fort William H. Seward in Alaska, where Wyche remained until July 1914. He later spent several months at the Plattsburgh Barracks in Plattsburgh, New York, before graduating from the Mounted Service School, and serving in Texas beginning in 1916 (briefly with the Signal Corps), during which he was promoted to first lieutenant. In 1917, he married Mary Louise Dunn. They had a daughter, Elizabeth. He spent time at Fort Sam Houston, Leon Springs and Camp MacArthur in Texas, and Camp Upton in New York, until May 1917, a month after the American entry into World War I, during which he was appointed to captain.

=== World War I and interwar period ===
Upon joining the American Expeditionary Forces (AEF) on 18 May 1917, Wyche was promoted to the temporary rank of major then lieutenant colonel. He embarked for France on 22 June 1917, and spent most of his time in the St. Dié sector on the Western Front, before returning to the United States to help train gunners in early August. He took command of an artillery regiment at Camp Jackson, in South Carolina, from July to December 1918, a month after the Armistice with Germany which ended World War I. After leaving Camp Jackson, Wyche traveled to Washington, D.C., to work with the Purchase, Storage, and Traffic Division of the War Department. He remained there until December 1919, when Wyche instructed students in artillery at Camp Taylor, in Kentucky. In 1920, he reverted to his substantive rank of captain, and taught at Camp Knox, in Kentucky, from June 1920 to June 1922. Being promoted to major while at Camp Knox, Wyche spent the next ten years instructing artillery students at Fort Sill, in Oklahoma, and Forts Leavenworth and Riley in Kansas. He also attended the United States Army Field Artillery School and United States Army Command and General Staff College, and at one point commanded the 2nd Battalion of the 1st Field Artillery Regiment.

The shoulder insignia of the 79th Infantry Division, which Major General Ira T. Wyche commanded from 1942−1945

Wyche left Fort Riley in August 1933 to attend the United States Army War College. After graduating, he assumed command of the 1st Battalion of the 14th Field Artillery Regiment in 1934. While in command, he received a promotion to lieutenant colonel. He later commanded the 2nd Battalion of the 4th Field Artillery Regiment from September 1938 to June 1940, when he was promoted to colonel. He then was the chief of the training sector at the Office of the Chief of Field Artillery until April 1941 (during which he became a brigadier general). At Camp Blanding in Florida, he was the commanding general of the 74th Field Artillery Brigade until March 1942. He took a course at the United States Army Command and General Staff College, where, after graduating, he was temporarily promoted to major general on 17 April 1942.

=== World War II and postwar period ===
Wyche spent time at various military camps, including Camp Pickett in Virginia, Camp Blanding, the Tennessee Maneuver Area, the Desert Training Center, Camp Phillips in Kansas, and the South Boston Army Base. He was appointed the commander of the 79th Infantry Division of the XV Corps, on 15 June 1942. He oversaw the division's attacks at the Battle of Cherbourg, where it spearheaded the attack on Fort Déroulède, and fought in several other battles, including the fight for the Forest of Parroy. The division participated in Operation Flashpoint in 1945.

While commanding the 79th Infantry Division, Wyche created a new program for funneling replacement troops into front line units. He felt that new recruits were not receiving enough training, and he created a divisional replacement pool. Each infantry regiment sent one officer and one noncommissioned officer to serve on the staff of the pool, which also included one officer and four enlisted men selected from the division at large. This pool repeated most of the checking that new men had received at the forward replacement battalions, including the zeroing of rifles. Additional pool camps were operated in the three regimental sections and another one was maintained in the special troops section. These camps gave new arrivals a chance to learn many lessons from experienced soldiers. The success of this 79th Division pool caused the 44th Infantry and 100th Infantry Divisions, as well as some of the other XV Corps units to adopt similar methods.

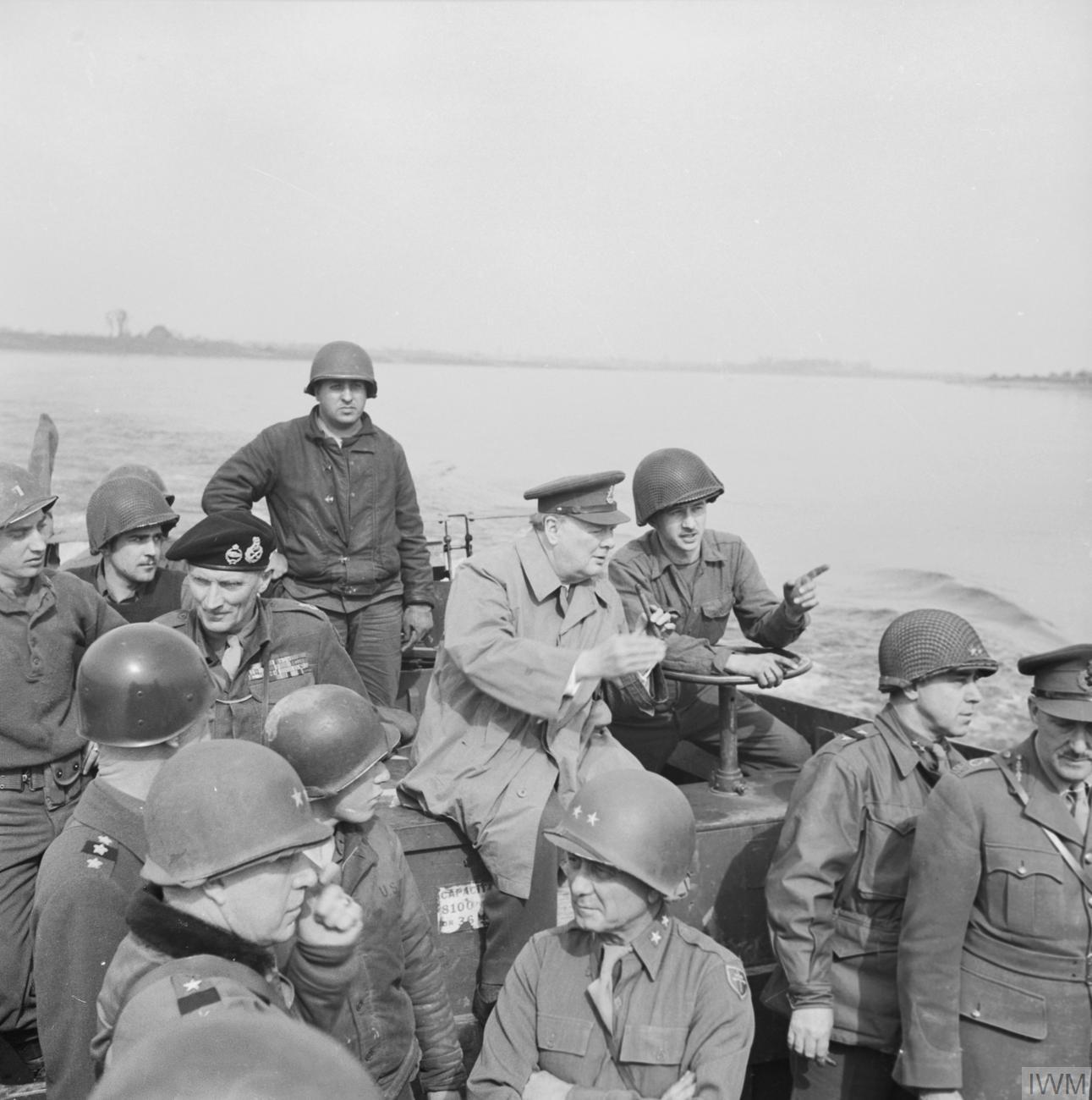
The British Prime Minister, Winston Churchill (center), crosses the River Rhine to the east bank, south of Wesel, in an American Landing Craft Vehicle Personnel (or Higgins boat) with Field Marshal Sir Bernard Montgomery (left of Churchill), who is talking to U.S. Lieutenant General William H. Simpson, Field Marshal Sir Alan Brooke (furthest right) who is standing in front of U.S. Major General Leland Hobbs. To Simpson's right is Major General John B. Anderson, who is talking to Major General Ira T. Wyche. Picture taken on 25 March 1945.

According to U.S. Army G-2 intelligence the 361st Volksgrenadier Division released a report on 25 October 1944 that stated: "The 79th Division is said to have fought particularly well in Normandy and is considered as one of the best attack divisions of the U. S. Army." Well-liked by his soldiers, Wyche was known as the "Doughboy's General", and called 'Papa' Wyche by his soldiers, as a result of his daily inspections of the Division's camp. For his service, he received the Army Distinguished Service Medal, the Silver Star and the Legion of Merit.

Wyche handed over command of the division to Leroy H. Watson on 20 May 1945, after which he commanded VIII Corps until December 1945, when he took command of III Corps, before leaving that post in May 1946. He was later a member of the Press Integration Interview Board and Officer Interview Board. In May 1946, Wyche took command of the 1st Service Command, which he held until 30 January 1947. Wyche then became the Inspector General of the U. S. Army in January, receiving the permanent rank of major general. While inspector general, he investigated charges raised by newspaper columnist Robert Ruark against Lt. Gen. John C. H. Lee, that he misused enlisted men under his command in occupied Italy. Wyche exonerated Lee in a report he issued in October 1947. The 12,000 word report concluded that Ruark had presented a "wholly false picture of conditions". He retired from the office and army service on 30 September 1948.

== Later life and death ==
After retiring from the army in 1948, Wyche moved to Pinehurst, North Carolina with his wife, Mary. He would live there until his death on 8 July 1981 at Moore General Hospital. Wyche is buried at the Fort Bragg Main Post Cemetery.

== Bibliography ==
- Cox, Hank H. (2018). The General Who Wore Six Stars: The Inside Story of John C. H. Lee. Lincoln, Nebraska: Potomac Books. ISBN 978-1-61234-963-3. OCLC 989124130.
- Cullum, George W. (1920). Biographical Register of the Officers and Graduates of the US Military Academy at West Point New York since its Establishment in 1802: Supplement Volume VI 1910–1920. Chicago, Illinois: R. R. Donnelly and Sons, The Lakeside Press.
- Cullum, George W. (1930). Biographical Register of the Officers and Graduates of the US Military Academy at West Point New York since its Establishment in 1802: Supplement Volume VII 1920–1930. Chicago, Illinois: R. R. Donnelly and Sons, The Lakeside Press.
- Cullum, George W. (1940). Biographical Register of the Officers and Graduates of the US Military Academy at West Point New York Since Its Establishment in 1802: Supplement Volume VIII 1930–1940. Chicago: R. R. Donnelly and Sons, The Lakeside Press.
- Cullum, George W. (1950). Biographical Register of the Officers and Graduates of the US Military Academy at West Point New York since its Establishment in 1802: Supplement Volume IX 1940–1950. Chicago, Illinois: R. R. Donnelly and Sons, The Lakeside Press.
- Cullum, George Washington; Holden, Edward Singleton (1920). Biographical Register of the Officers and Graduates of the U.S. Military Academy at West Point, N.Y.: 1–6810. Houghton, Mifflin.
- Lerwill, Leonard L. (1954). The Personnel Replacement System in the United States Army (PDF). Washington, D.C.: United States Army. Archived from the original (PDF) on 20 September 2015. This article incorporates text from this source, which is in the public domain.
- Powell, William S. (2000). Dictionary of North Carolina Biography: Vol. 6, T-Z. Univ of North Carolina Press. ISBN 9780807866993.
- Wood, Sterling A. (1947). History of the 313th Infantry in World War II. Infantry journal Press. p. 23. "Ira T. Wyche general ."
- The Cross of Lorraine: a combat history of the 79th Infantry Division, June 1942-December 1945 (PDF). United States Army. 1946.

Military offices
Preceded by Newly activated organization	Commanding General 79th Infantry Division; 1942–1945	Succeeded by Leroy H. Watson
Preceded by Troy H. Middleton	Commanding General VIII Corps; August–December 1945	Succeeded by Post deactivated
Preceded by James Van Fleet	Commanding General III Corps; February–May 1945	Succeeded by Leland Hobbs
Preceded by Daniel Isom Sultan	Inspector General of the United States Army; 1947–1948	Succeeded by Louis A. Craig
