= Henry De Butts =

- Military career
- Allegiance: United States of America
- Branch: United States Army
- Service years: 1791–1797
- Rank: Captain
- Commands: Adjutant General of the U.S. Army; Inspector General of the U.S. Army
- Conflicts: Northwest Indian War; Battle of the Wabash; Battle of Fallen Timbers

Henry De Butts was an American military officer who served as acting Adjutant General and acting Inspector General of the U.S. Army from 1792 to 1793.

== Biography ==
De Butts was the younger brother of General Sir Augustus De Butts.

He entered the army from Maryland as a lieutenant in the levies of 1791. He was wounded in the Battle of the Wabash while serving under General Arthur St. Clair in November, 1791. He was appointed to act as Adjutant General in March 1792, when Winthrop Sargent declined appointment to the office. He was promoted to captain in December, 1792 and relieved as Adjutant General in February, 1793. He served as aide-de-camp to General Anthony Wayne in the Battle of Fallen Timbers in August, 1794. He was assigned to the 4th Infantry in November, 1796, and resigned December 31, 1797.

== See also ==
- List of Adjutant Generals of the U.S. Army
- List of Inspectors General of the U.S. Army

Military offices
Preceded by Ebenezer Denny	Adjutant General of the U. S. Army; March 10, 1792 – February 23, 1793 (acting)	Succeeded by Michael Rudolph (acting)
Preceded by William North (left office 1787)	Inspector General of the U. S. Army; March 10, 1792 – February 23, 1793 (acting)	Succeeded by Michael Rudolph (acting)
