= Abimael Youngs Nicoll =

- Born: New York
- Relatives: John Cochran Nicoll (son)
- Military career
- Allegiance: United States of America
- Branch: United States Army
- Service years: 1791–1814
- Rank: Colonel
- Commands: Adjutant General of the U.S. Army; Inspector General of the U.S. Army (acting)

Abimael Youngs Nicoll was an American military officer who served as Adjutant General and acting Inspector General of the U.S. Army from 1807 to 1812. He held the rank of colonel.

== See also ==
- List of Adjutant Generals of the U.S. Army
- List of Inspectors General of the U.S. Army

Military offices
Preceded by Thomas H. Cushing	Adjutant General of the U. S. Army; April 2, 1807 – April 28, 1812	Succeeded by Alexander Macomb (acting)
Preceded by Thomas H. Cushing (acting)	Inspector General of the U.S. Army; April 2, 1807 – April 28, 1812 (acting)	Succeeded by Alexander Smyth
