= Jonathan Haskell =

American military officer (1755–1814)

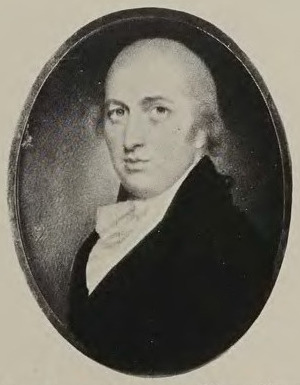
- portrait by Walter Robertson
- Born: March 19, 1755; Rochester, Massachusetts
- Died: December 14, 1814 (aged 59); Belpre, Ohio
- Military career
- Allegiance: United States of America
- Branch: United States Army
- Service years: 1776–1784,1791–1796
- Rank: Major
- Commands: Adjutant General of the U.S. Army; Inspector General of the U.S. Army
- Conflicts: American Revolutionary War; Battle of Saratoga; Battle of Monmouth; Northwest Indian War; Battle of Fallen Timbers

Jonathan Haskell (March 19, 1755 – December 14, 1814) was an American military officer who served as acting Adjutant General and acting Inspector General of the U.S. Army in 1796. After the war he returned to farm in Belpre, Ohio.

== See also ==
- List of Adjutant Generals of the U.S. Army
- List of Inspectors General of the U.S. Army

Military offices
Preceded by John Mills (acting)	Adjutant General of the U. S. Army; February 27, 1796 – August 1, 1796 (acting)	Succeeded by Edward Butler (acting)
Preceded by John Mills (acting)	Inspector General of the U.S. Army; February 27, 1796 – August 1, 1796 (acting)	Succeeded by Edward Butler (acting)
