= Edward Butler (soldier) =

American military officer (1762–1803)

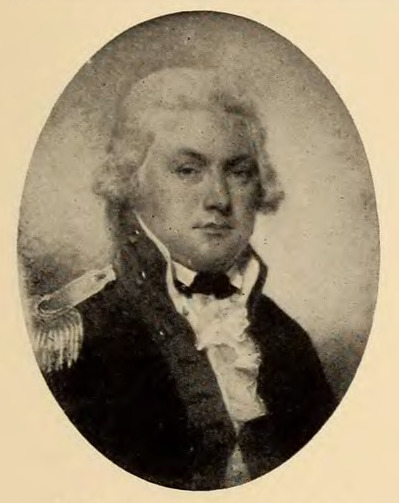
- Portrait by Edward Greene Malbone
- Born: March 20, 1762; Pennsylvania
- Died: May 6, 1803 (aged 41); Springfield, Tennessee
- Relatives: Richard Butler (brother); Edward G. W. Butler (son)
- Military career
- Allegiance: United States
- Branch: United States Army
- Service years: 1778–1783; 1791–1803
- Rank: Captain
- Commands: Adjutant General; Inspector General
- Conflicts: American Revolutionary War; Battle of Stony Point; Siege of Yorktown; Battle of Green Spring; Northwest Indian War; Battle of the Wabash; Battle of Fallen Timbers

Edward Butler (March 20, 1762 – May 6, 1803) was an American military officer who served as acting Adjutant General and acting Inspector General of the U.S. Army from 1793 to 1794 and from 1796 to 1797.

== Early life ==
Butler was born on March 20, 1762, in West Pennsboro Township, Pennsylvania. He was one of five Butler brothers from Pennsylvania who served in the American Revolution.

== Military career ==
Butler was commissioned an ensign in the 9th Pennsylvania Regiment on July 1, 1778, at the age of 16. He was promoted to lieutenant on January 28, 1779, and transferred to the 5th Pennsylvania Regiment on January 17, 1781. He was again transferred to the 3rd Pennsylvania Regiment on January 1, 1783, and was discharged on November 3, 1783, when the Continental Army was disbanded.

He was on original member of the Society of the Cincinnati along with three of his brothers.

He was a captain in the levies under Major General Arthur St. Clair and saw action at St. Clair's Defeat in which his brother Richard was killed and his brother Thomas was wounded.

He was commissioned a captain in the United States Army on March 5, 1792, and transferred to the 4th Sub-Legion on September 4, 1792.

On July 18, 1793, he was appointed Adjutant and Inspector of the United States Army and served until May 13, 1794. He was assigned as a captain in the 4th Infantry Regiment on November 1, 1796. He was transferred to the 2nd Infantry Regiment on April 1, 1802.

He died on May 6, 1803.

== See also ==
- List of Adjutant Generals of the U.S. Army
- List of Inspectors General of the U.S. Army
- Fighting Butlers

== Notes ==
Military offices
Preceded by Michael Rudolph (acting)	Adjutant General of the U. S. Army; July 18, 1793 – May 13, 1794 (acting)	Succeeded by John Mills (acting)
Preceded by Jonathan Haskell	Adjutant General of the U. S. Army; August 1, 1796 – February 27, 1797 (acting)	Succeeded by Thomas H. Cushing (acting)
Preceded by Michael Rudolph (acting)	Inspector General of the U.S. Army; July 18, 1793 – May 13, 1794 (acting)	Succeeded by John Mills (acting)
Preceded by Jonathan Haskell	Inspector General of the U.S. Army; August 1, 1796 – February 27, 1797 (acting)	Succeeded by Thomas H. Cushing (acting)
