= Montigny-sur-Aube =

- Commune
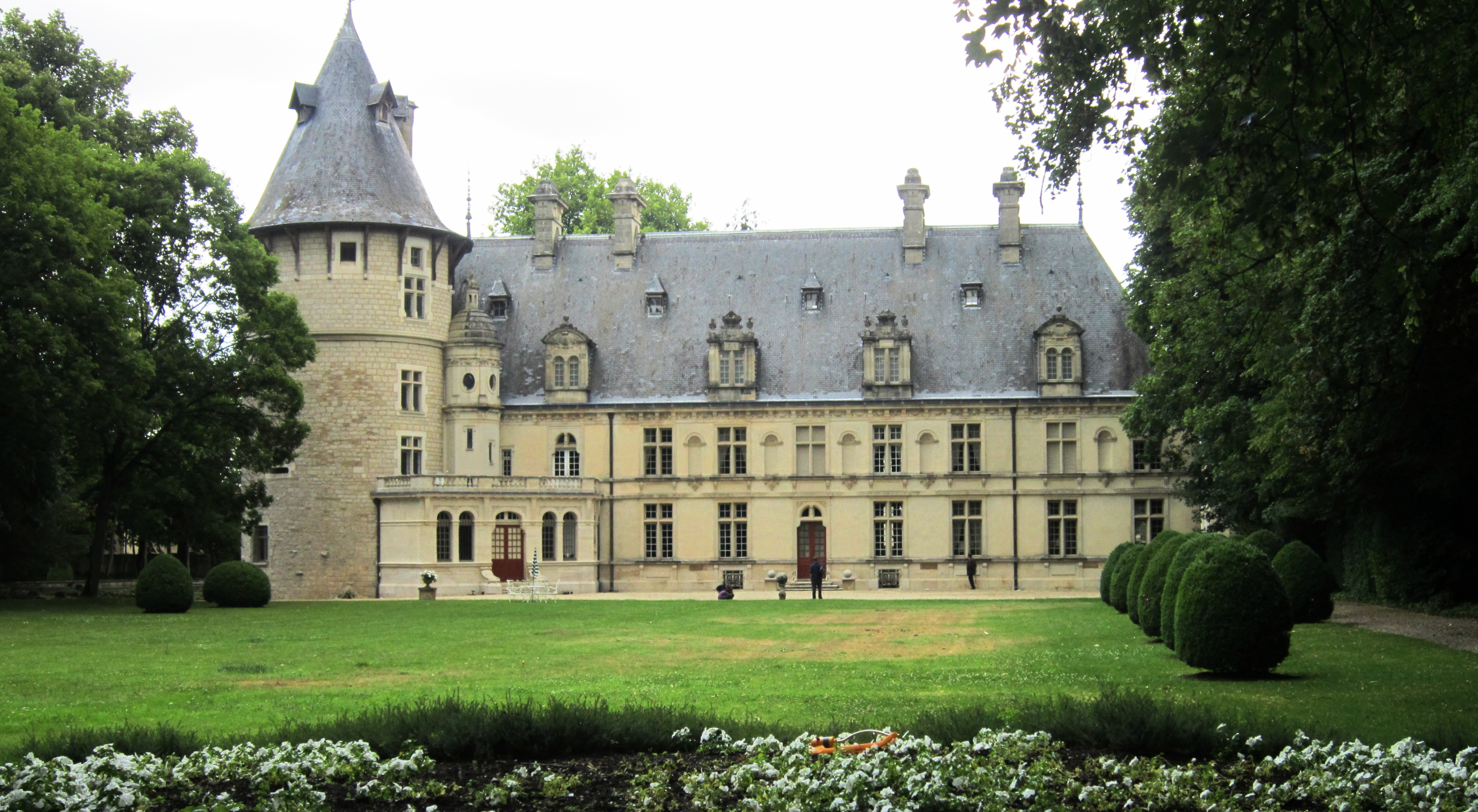
- Chateau

- Coat of arms
- Location of Montigny-sur-Aube
- Location within France Location within Bourgogne-Franche-Comté
- Coordinates: 47°57′15″N 4°46′42″E
- Country: France
- Region: Bourgogne-Franche-Comté
- Department: Côte-d'Or
- Arrondissement: Montbard
- Canton: Châtillon-sur-Seine
- Intercommunality: Pays Châtillonnais

Government
  - Mayor (2020–2026): Philippe Chardon
- Area^{1}: 19.5 km^{2} (7.5 sq mi)
- Highest elevation: 348 m (1,142 ft)
- Lowest elevation: 225 m (738 ft)
- Population (2023): 261
  - Density: 13.4/km^{2} (34.7/sq mi)
- Demonym: Montignois
- Time zone: UTC+01:00 (CET)
  - Summer (DST): UTC+02:00 (CEST)
- INSEE/Postal code: 21432 /21520
- ^{1} French Land Register data, which excludes lakes, ponds, glaciers > 1 km^{2} (0.386 sq mi or 247 acres) and river estuaries.

Montigny-sur-Aube (French pronunciation: [mɔ̃tiɲi syʁ ob], literally Montigny on Aube) is a commune in the Côte-d'Or department in eastern France.

== Population ==
Historical population
Year	Pop.	±% p.a.
1968	501	—
1975	451	−1.49%
1982	387	−2.16%
1990	333	−1.86%
1999	343	+0.33%
2007	319	−0.90%
2012	294	−1.62%
2017	264	−2.13%
2023	261	−0.19%
Source: INSEE

== See also ==
- Communes of the Côte-d'Or department
