= Henry Doctor Jr. =

United States Army general (1932–2007)

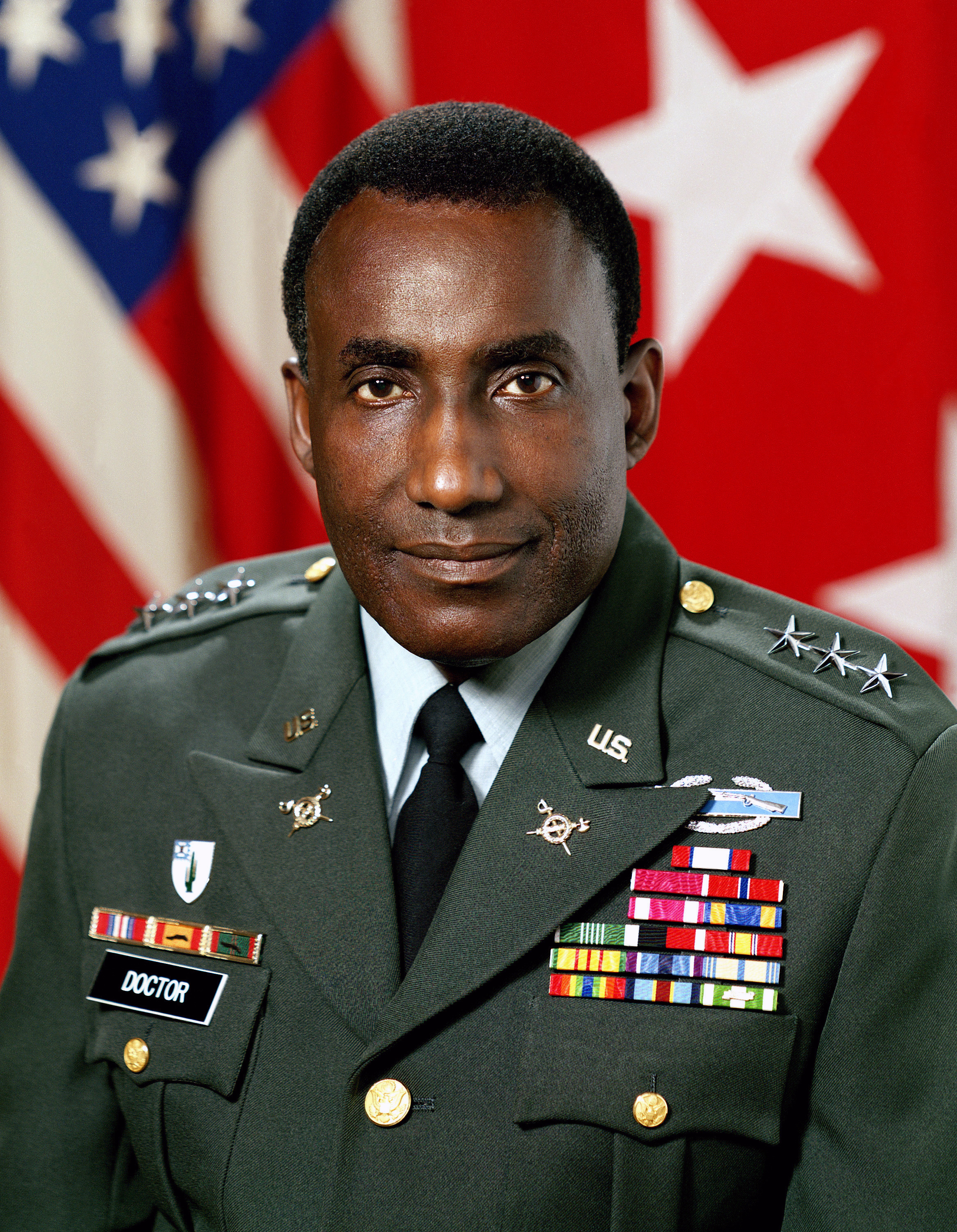
- Henry Doctor Jr.
- Born: August 23, 1932; Oakley, South Carolina
- Died: December 7, 2007 (aged 75); Centreville, Virginia
- Burial place: Arlington National Cemetery
- Military career
- Branch: U.S. Army
- Service years: 1954–1989
- Rank: Lieutenant General
- Commands: 2nd Infantry Division
- Conflicts: Vietnam War

Lieutenant General Henry Doctor Jr. (August 23, 1932 – December 7, 2007) was the Commanding General, 2nd Infantry Division, Eighth United States Army, based in South Korea. His last assignment was as The Inspector General of the U.S. Army.

Doctor was born on August 23, 1932, in Oakley, South Carolina, to the late Henry Doctor and Annie Aikens Doctor. He attended Berkeley Training High School in Moncks Corner, South Carolina.

In 1954, he graduated from South Carolina State College with a Bachelor of Science in Agriculture and is a member of Omega Psi Phi. He earned his Master of Arts in Counseling and Psychological Services from Georgia State University. He is a graduate of the U.S. Army Command and General Staff College and the U.S. Army War College.

During 1967, then Major Doctor was S3 for the 1st Battalion, 35th Infantry Regiment, 25th and 4th Infantry Divisions. He took temporary command of the Battalion when the Battalion commander, LTC Kimmel's C&C chopper was shot down on November 14, 1967.

Doctor was awarded an honorary Doctor of Laws degree by his alma mater South Carolina State and an honorary Doctor of Military Science degree by The Citadel.

On December 7, 2007, Henry Doctor died and was later buried at Arlington National Cemetery.

On July 8, 2008, the South Carolina Department of Transportation announced that a five-mile stretch of Old U.S. Route 52 south of Moncks Corner which passes near his birthplace in Oakley would be named the "Lieutenant General Henry Doctor Jr. Memorial Highway".

== Awards ==
- Distinguished Service Medal (2 Awards)
- Legion of Merit
- Bronze Star
- Meritorious Service Medal
- Air Medal
- Combat Infantryman Badge
- Awarded the Republic of Korea Order of National Security Merit - Cheonsu Medal, 1985
