= Virgil L. Peterson =

Inspector General of the US Army (1882–1956)

Virgil Lee Peterson
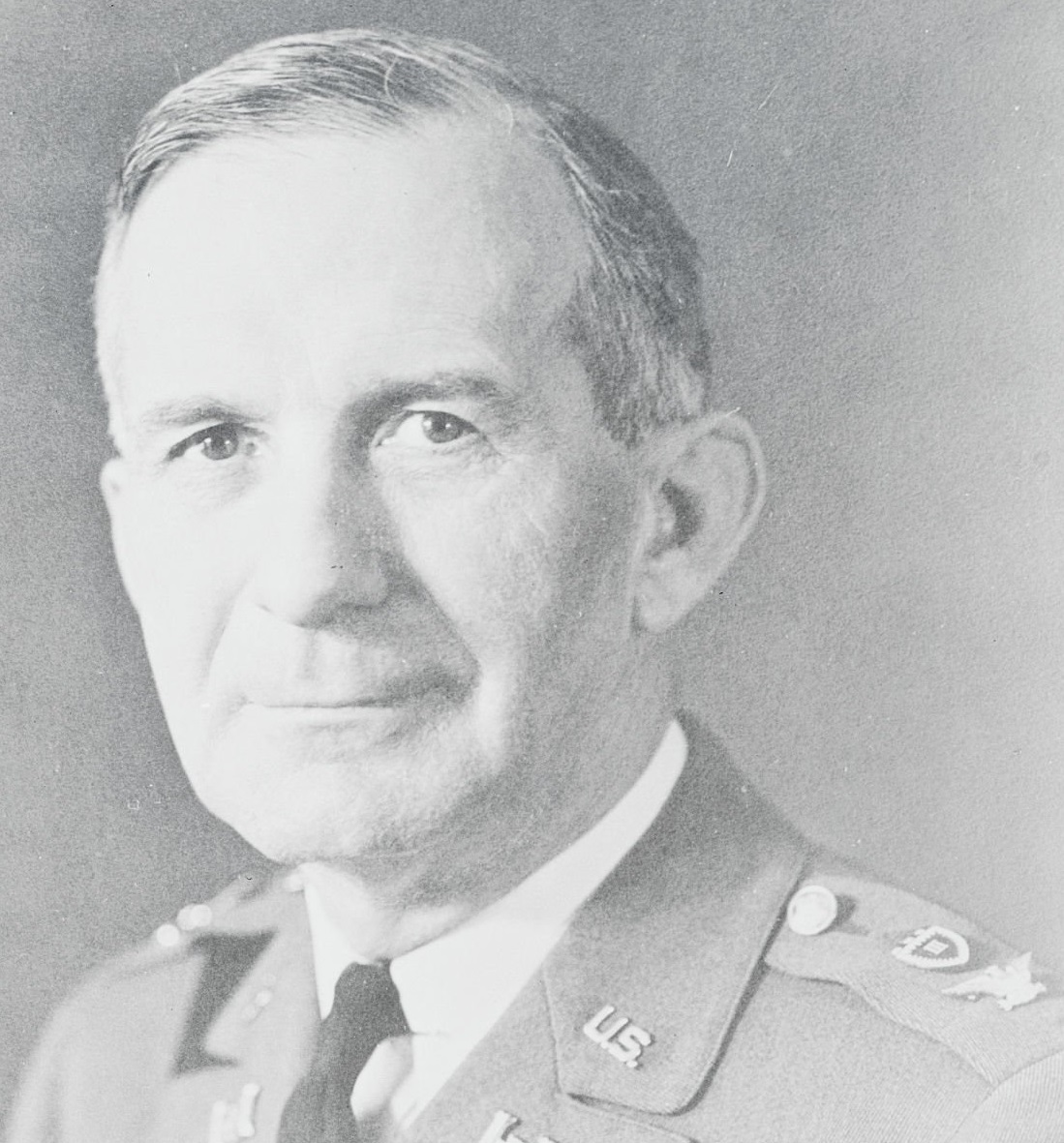
- Peterson as a colonel commanding the 3rd Engineers
- Born: 22 September 1882; Raywick, Kentucky, United States
- Died: 15 February 1956 (aged 73); Washington, D.C., United States
- Burial place: Arlington National Cemetery, Virginia, United States
- Children: sons Jack, Larry, Dick Peterson
- Military career
- Allegiance: United States
- Branch: United States Army
- Service years: 1908–1946
- Rank: Major General
- Unit: United States Army Corps of Engineers
- Commands: 3rd Engineer Regiment; U.S. Army Inspector General
- Awards: Army Distinguished Service Medal (twice)

Virgil Lee Peterson (22 September 1882 – 15 February 1956) was an Inspector General of the United States Army. Peterson graduated third in the United States Military Academy class of 1908, and much of his early career was spent in the United States Army Corps of Engineers, including serving as the district engineer of the Los Angeles District and commander of the 3rd Engineers.

During World War I, he was Commanding Officer, Engineer Officers' Training Camp at Camp Lee, Virginia, from April to August 1918; and Director of Training at Camp Humphreys, Virginia, until October 1918. He was awarded the Army Distinguished Service Medal twice, once for his service during World War I, and again for his work as Inspector General during World War II.

== Early life ==
Peterson was born on 22 September 1882 in Raywick, Kentucky, and attended Centre College, where he played football and received a Bachelor of Science in 1902. He then taught until 1904, when he entered the United States Military Academy. He was made a cadet corporal, cadet first sergeant, and eventually cadet captain. Peterson was a skilled rifleman and played for the school's polo team. He graduated third of 108 in the United States Military Academy class of 1908. Upon graduation, Peterson was commissioned as a second lieutenant in the United States Army Corps of Engineers.

== Military service ==
=== Junior officer ===
United States Army Corps of Engineers logo

From February to May 1908, Peterson was stationed at Fort Leavenworth. Until September, he was at Fort Riley, when he was assigned to map work in Fort Benjamin Harrison. From 30 June to 13 July 1909, he was at the military tournament in Toledo, Ohio. Peterson then attended the engineering school at Fort Lesley J. McNair, graduating on 5 November 1910. He was stationed with the 3rd Battalion of Engineers at Fort Leavenworth until 9 March 1911, during which he performed various duties and embarked on several short map-making tours in Ohio and Indiana. Peterson was then stationed in San Antonio with the Maneuver Division until 4 November 1911, when he was sent to the Philippines. First at Camp Stotsenburg, Peterson worked on a topographical survey of Luzon from 5 February to 1 May 1912. He was in charge of construction of a mechanical and electrical plant on Corregidor Island until 1 September 1913. Peterson then served as an aide-de-camp to J. Franklin Bell until 15 September 1914. He also supervised the construction of a hydroelectric plant and officers barracks. He then returned to the United States in late 1914.

On February 28, 1915, Peterson was made a captain. From February 1915 to August 1918, Peterson commanded groups; including the 9th Engineer Battalion and the 8th Engineer Mounted Battalion, at various camps; including in Brownsville, Texas, the Washington Barracks, and in El Paso, Texas. He then commanded the Fourth Engineer Officers' Training Camp at Camp Lee until 10 August 1918 and at Camp A. A. Humphreys, he was a director of Military Training until October 1918. At Camp Lee and Camp A. A. Humphreys, he directed the training of 4,500 engineer officers and 20,000 enlisted soldiers. For his service he received the Army Distinguished Service Medal. The citation for the medal reads:

The President of the United States of America, authorized by Act of Congress, July 9, 1918, takes pleasure in presenting the Army Distinguished Service Medal to Colonel (Corps of Engineers) Virgil L. Peterson, United States Army, for exceptionally meritorious and distinguished services to the Government of the United States, in a duty of great responsibility during World War I. As Commanding Officer, Engineer Officers' Training Camp at Camp Lee, Virginia, from April to August 1918; and Director of Training at Camp Humphreys, Virginia, until October 1918, Colonel Peterson displayed marked foresight, rare ability, and sound judgment in the reorganization of the standardization of the instruction for engineer troops. By his organizing and training ability, indefatigable efforts, and high military attainments he successfully directed the training of 4,500 engineer officers and 20,000 enlisted men, thereby rendering services of great value to our Government in positions of great responsibility.

=== Rise and infrastructure work ===
Peterson left Camp A. A. Humphreys to attend the United States Army War College to November 1918. Peterson was then the commandment of the engineering school at Camp Humphreys from November 1918 to June 1920, and served as the assistant to the District Engineer in Boston until 31 December 1920. During his tenure he was credited with increasing the quality of education for engineers, while shortening the course length. After 1920, he spent his time in New England, in various engineering districts, with the majority as Providence, Rhode Island district engineer.

At the United States Army Command and General Staff College in Fort Leavenworth, Peterson was a student from August 1924 to June 1925. Until 1929, he was an instructor at the school. He then was Assistant Director of Public Buildings and Public Parks of the Capitol in Washington D.C. until 30 March 1930. Peterson next was an assistant to the United States Army Corps of Engineers Chief of Engineers, as chief of the Miscellaneous Civil Section from April 1930 to August 1932, during which he was promoted to Lieutenant-Colonel on 1 November 1931. As chief of the section, he oversaw the study of projects, preparation of correspondence, and recommendations in all matters relating to the establishment of and changes in harbor lines; the removal of wrecks and other obstructions to navigation; the bridging of navigable waters; the supervision of New York Harbor; the lakes survey; the water supply and the public buildings and grounds of Washington, D.C.; the preservation of Niagara Falls; the national parks; and other miscellaneous matters.

He spent a year at the United States Army War College, where upon graduating he was appointed district engineer of the Los Angeles Engineering District. From February 1934 to February 1936, Peterson commanded the 3rd Engineers at Schofield Barracks. From May 1936 to March 1938, he served as the district engineer of the Detroit River and Harbor District. From March 1938 to February 1940, Peterson was chief of staff at the headquarters of the Sixth Corps Area in Chicago.

=== Inspector General ===
On 27 February 1940, Peterson was appointed to Inspector General of the United States Army. As Inspector General, he was credited with "seeing more men, maneuvers, and facilities than any other officer in the Army."

In this role, he helped instill a number of policies that would guide the military through coming cultural shifts. In the spring of 1942, he recommended forming fewer black units due to their slow deployment because staff at overseas theaters often refused to accept them. Peterson argued that it was more important to focus on supplying the Army with adequate combat forces. The suggestion was not acted upon. He investigated the treatment of Japanese American soldiers at Fort Riley and in Arizona.

He was charged by George C. Marshall, the Chief of Staff of the United States Army, to investigate whether training and maneuvers produced adequate knowledge among soldiers. Peterson advocated for forecasting the construction of cantonments so that there would be fewer material shortages, which was successfully incorporated. He was hesitant towards the Psychological Warfare Division in its early stages, feeling it provided unclear value to the army; Peterson's recommendations led to changes in the structure of the department.

== Later life ==
The amount of work began to affect his health, and after having a heart attack, was reassigned to the Army Service Corps. Peterson retired from the Army on 28 February 1946. He received the Army Distinguished Service Medal (presented as an oak leaf cluster) for his work as Inspector General. In his column Washington Merry-Go-Round, Drew Pearson claimed that Peterson was "not a brilliant success," and he received his post of Inspector General as a result of his friendship with Edwin Watson. Peterson lived in Washington, D.C. until his death on 15 February 1956, at the age of 73. He was buried at Arlington National Cemetery.

== Bibliography ==
- Cullum, George W. (1920). Biographical Register of the Officers and Graduates of the US Military Academy at West Point New York since its Establishment in 1802: Supplement Volume VI 1910–1920. Saginaw, Michigan: Seeman & Peters, Printers.
- Cullum, George W. (1930). Biographical Register of the Officers and Graduates of the US Military Academy at West Point New York since its Establishment in 1802: Supplement Volume VII 1920–1930. Chicago, Illinois: R. R. Donnelly and Sons, The Lakeside Press.
- Cullum, George W. (1940). Biographical Register of the Officers and Graduates of the US Military Academy at West Point New York Since Its Establishment in 1802: Supplement Volume VIII 1930–1940. Chicago: R. R. Donnelly and Sons, The Lakeside Press.
- Cullum, George W. (1950). Biographical Register of the Officers and Graduates of the US Military Academy at West Point New York since its Establishment in 1802: Supplement Volume IX 1940–1950. Chicago, Illinois: R. R. Donnelly and Sons, The Lakeside Press.
- Sylvan, William C.; Smith, Francis G. (2009). Normandy to Victory: The War Diary of General Courtney H. Hodges and the First U.S. Army. University Press of Kentucky. ISBN 978-0813138664.
- Whitehorne, Joseph W. A. (1998). The inspectors general of the United States Army, 1903-1939 (PDF). Washington, D.C.: United States Army Center of Military History. Archived from the original (PDF) on 21 September 2015.
