= Continental Army =

Army of the United States (1775–1784)

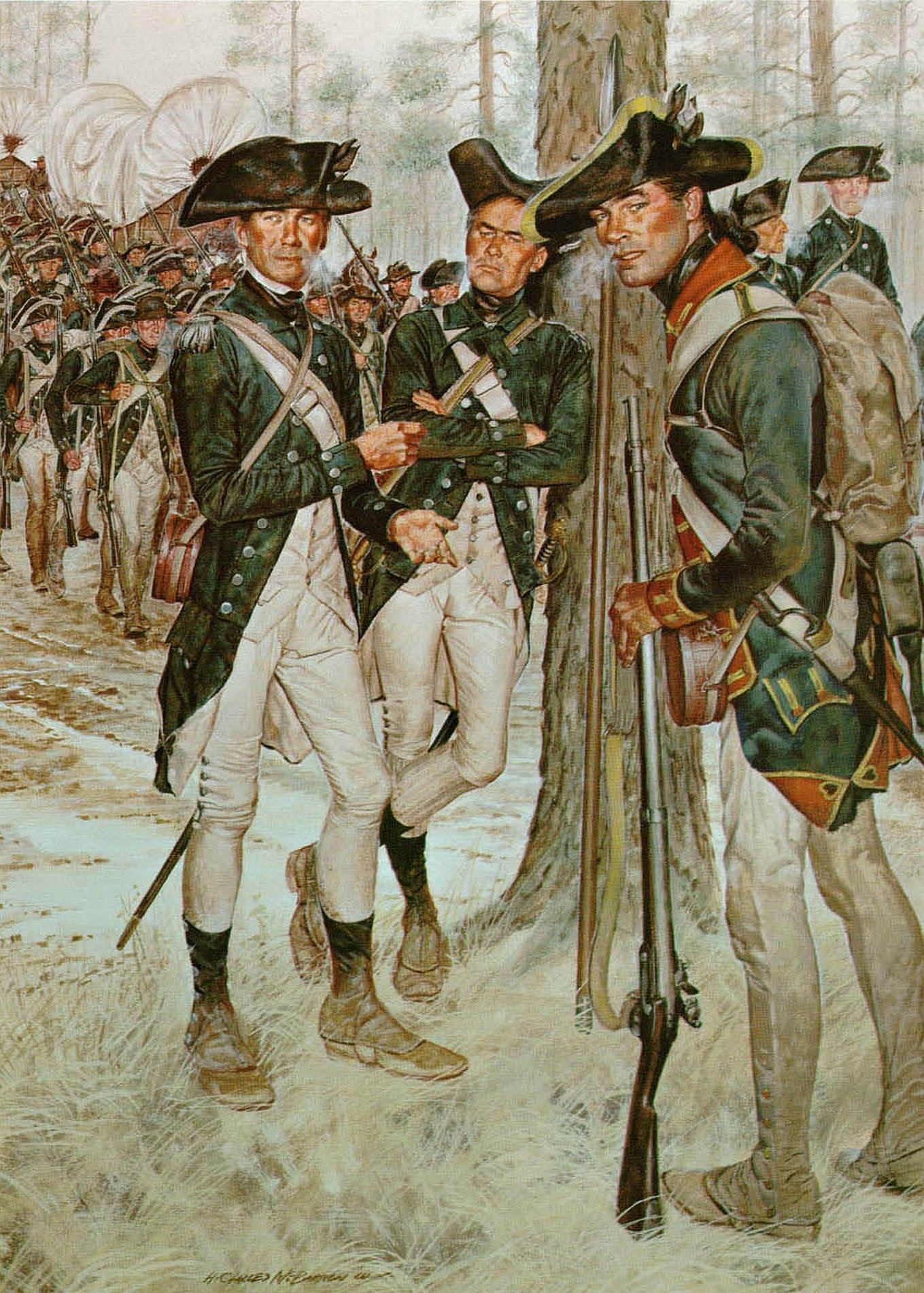
- The American Soldier, 1782 by H. Charles McBarron
- Founded: June 14, 1775
- Disbanded: June 2, 1784
- Country: United States
- Type: Army
- Size: 48,000 at peak (231,000 total)
- Nickname: "Continentals"
- Campaigns: Revolutionary War; Boston; Quebec; First Charleston; Long Island; Trenton; Princeton; Saratoga; Brandywine; Germantown; Monmouth; First Savannah; Second Savannah; Second Charleston; Cowpens; Guilford Court House; Yorktown

Commanders
- Commander in Chief: George Washington

The Continental Army was an army founded on June 14, 1775, by the Second Continental Congress in Philadelphia to coordinate the mutual defense of the United Colonies against the Kingdom of Great Britain during the Revolutionary War. It was periodically supplemented by state troops and volunteer militia. George Washington served as the commander-in-chief.

The army was disbanded on June 2, 1784, by Congress; with the exception of 25 privates at Fort Pitt and 55 privates, with a small artillery detachment, at West Point and other magazines.

== Background ==
The Continental Army was composed of soldiers from the United Colonies and, after 1776, the United States. The Revolutionary War began at the Battles of Lexington and Concord, on April 19, 1775, at a time when the colonial revolutionaries had no standing army. Previously, each colony had relied on colonial militias, which were made up of part-time citizen-soldiers for local defense, or the raising of temporary provincial troops, as was done during the French and Indian War between 1754 and 1763. As tensions with Great Britain increased in the years leading to the war, colonists began to reform their militias in preparation for the perceived potential conflict. Training of militiamen increased after the passage of the Intolerable Acts in 1774. Richard Henry Lee proposed forming a national militia force, but the First Continental Congress rejected the idea. On April 23, 1775, the Massachusetts Provincial Congress authorized the raising of a colonial army consisting of 26 company regiments. New Hampshire, Rhode Island, and Connecticut soon raised similar but smaller forces.

== History ==
On June 14, 1775, the Second Continental Congress, meeting in present-day Independence Hall in Philadelphia, voted to establish the Continental Army to provide for the common defense of the colonies, and incorporate the New England Army of Observation already in place outside Boston (22,000 troops) and New York City (5,000). It also raised the first ten companies of Continental Army troops on a one-year enlistment, including riflemen from the Province of Pennsylvania, Province of Maryland, and Colony of Virginia, which were used as light infantry. The Pennsylvania riflemen became the 1st Continental Regiment in January 1776. On June 14, 1775, Congress unanimously elected George Washington Commander in Chief of the Army of the United Colonies. Washington accepted and departed immediately for Boston, where he led the successful Siege of Boston.

Washington served as the army's Commander in Chief throughout the Revolutionary War without any compensation except for reimbursement of expenses. As the Continental Congress increasingly adopted the responsibilities and posture of a legislature for a sovereign state, the role of the Continental Army became the subject of considerable debate. Some Americans had a general aversion to maintaining a standing army, but the requirements of the Revolutionary War against the British was seen as requiring the discipline and organization of an organized central military. As a result, the Continental Army evolved throughout the war, routinely reorganizing its units and ultimately seeking and obtaining support from France, which sought to counter British influence in North America.

By the end of 1775, during the first year of the Revolutionary War, the Continental Congress operated as a de facto war government, authorizing the creation of the Continental Army, the Navy, and the Marines. A new flag was needed to represent both the Congress and the United Colonies. It is believed that the Continental Union Flag, representing the soldiers and sailors unified as the armed forces of the United Colonies, was raised by George Washington's army on January 2, 1776, at Prospect Hill in Charlestown (present-day Somerville), near his headquarters in Cambridge, Massachusetts.

=== Evolution ===
The Continental Army's forces included several successive armies or establishments:

- The Continental Army of 1775, comprising the New England Army of Observation, was organized by Washington into three divisions, six brigades, and 38 regiments. Major General Philip Schuyler's ten regiments in New York were sent to invade Canada.
- The Continental Army of 1776, was reorganized after the initial enlistment period of the soldiers in the 1775 army had expired. Washington had submitted recommendations to the Continental Congress almost immediately after he had accepted the position of commander in chief, but the Congress took time to consider and implement these. Despite attempts to broaden the recruiting base beyond New England, the 1776 army remained skewed toward the Northeast both in terms of its composition and of its geographical focus. This army consisted of 36 regiments, most standardized to a single battalion of 768 men strong and formed into eight companies, with a rank-and-file strength of 640.
- The Continental Army of 1777–1780 evolved out of several critical reforms and political decisions that came about when it became apparent that the British were sending substantial forces to put an end to the American Revolution. The Second Continental Congress passed the "Eighty-eight Battalion Resolve", ordering each state to contribute one-battalion regiments in proportion to their population, and Washington subsequently received authority to raise an additional 16 battalions. Enlistment terms extended to three years or to "the length of the war" to avoid the year-end crises that depleted forces, including the notable near-collapse of the army at the end of 1776, which could have ended the war in a Continental, or American, loss by forfeit.
- The Continental Army of 1781–1782 saw the greatest crisis on the American side in the war. Congress was bankrupt, making it very difficult to replenish the soldiers whose three-year terms had expired. Popular support for the war reached an all-time low, and Washington had to put down mutinies both in the Pennsylvania Line and in the New Jersey Line. Congress voted to cut funding for the Army, but Washington managed nevertheless to secure important strategic victories.
- The Continental Army of 1783–1784 was succeeded by the United States Army, which exists to the present day. As peace was restored with the British, most of the regiments were disbanded in an orderly fashion, though several had already been diminished.

== Organization ==
=== Board of War and Ordnance ===
Military affairs were at first managed by the Continental Congress in plenary session, although specific matters were prepared by a number of ad hoc committees. In June 1776 a five-member standing committee, the Board of War and Ordnance, was established in order to replace the ad hoc committees. The five members who formed the Board fully participated in the plenary activities of Congress as well as in other committees and were unable to fully engage in the administrative leadership of the Continental Army. A new Board of War was therefore formed in October 1777, of three commissioners not member of Congress. Two more commissioners, not members of Congress, were shortly thereafter added, but in October 1778, the membership was set to three commissioners not members of Congress and two commissioners members of Congress. In early 1780, the Quartermaster General, the Commissary General of Purchase, and the Commissary General of Issue were put under the direction of the Board. The Office of the Secretary at War was created in February 1781, although the Office did not start its work until Benjamin Lincoln assumed the office in October 1781.

=== Commander in Chief ===
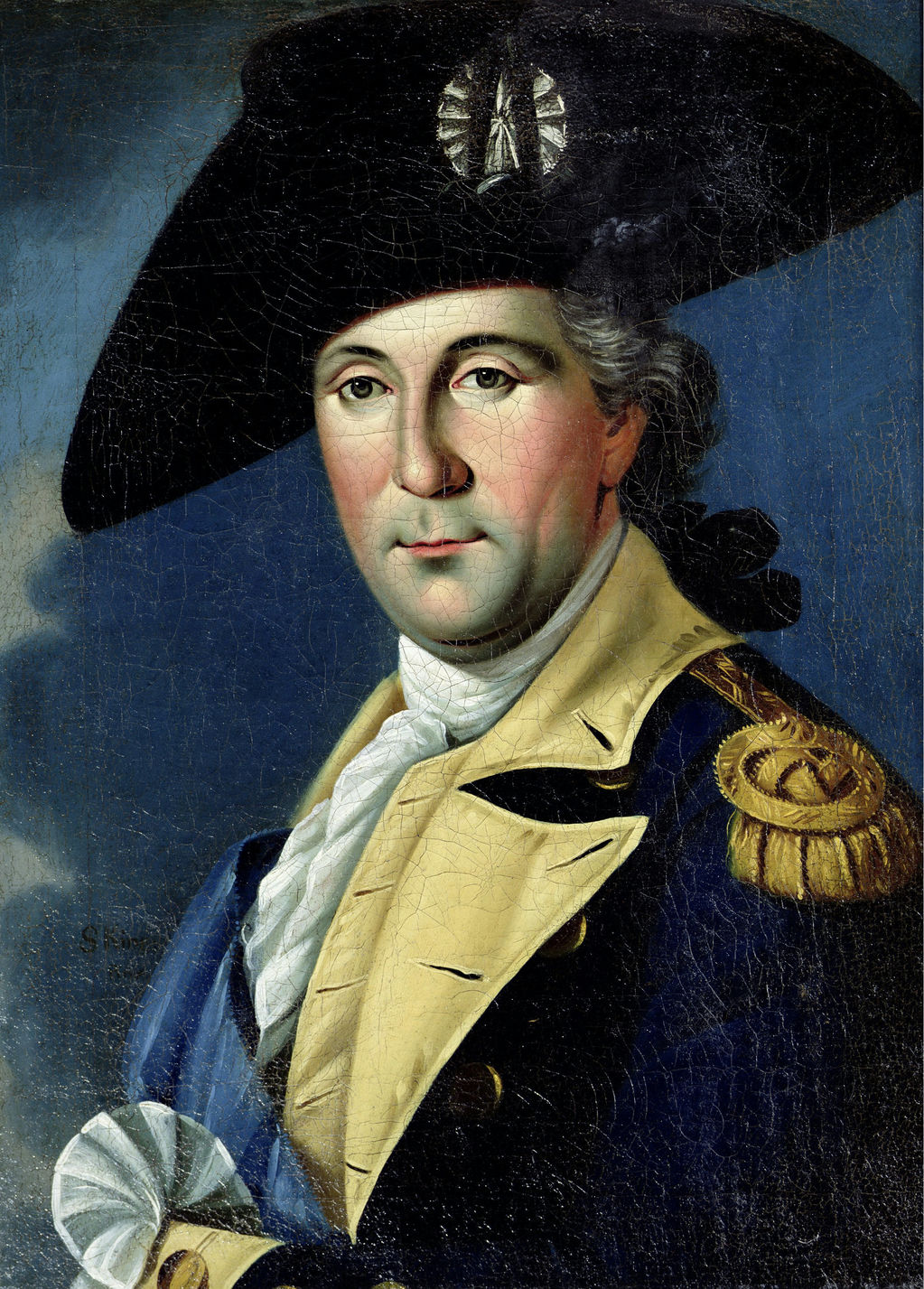
George Washington, appointed Commander in Chief of the Army of the United Colonies on June 15, 1775, by the Second Continental Congress

On June 14, 1775, delegates to the Second Continental Congress, convening in present-day Independence Hall in Philadelphia, unanimously elected George Washington as Commander in Chief of the Army of the United Colonies. Washington accepted the position, and served throughout the Revolutionary War without any compensation except for reimbursement of expenses.

Washington, as commander-in-chief, was supported by a chief administrative officer, the Adjutant General. Horatio Gates held the position (1775–1776), Joseph Reed (1776–1777), George Weedon and Isaac Budd Dunn (1777), Morgan Connor 1777, Timothy Pickering (1777–1778), Alexander Scammell (1778–1781), and Edward Hand (1781–1783).

An Inspector General assisted the Commander in Chief through periodically inspecting and reporting on the condition of troops. The first incumbent was Thomas Conway (1777–1778), followed by Baron von Steuben 1778–1784, under whom the position became that of a de facto chief of staff.

The Judge Advocate General assisted the Commander in Chief with the administration of military justice, but he did not, as his modern counterpart, give legal advice. William Tudor was the first appointee. He was followed by John Laurance in 1777 and Thomas Edwards in 1781

The Mustermaster General kept track by name of every officer and man serving in the army. The first mustermaster was Stephen Moylan. He was followed by Gunning Bedford Jr. 1776–1777 and Joseph Ward.

=== Territorial departments ===
Units of the Continental Army were assigned to any one of the territorial departments to decentralize command and administration. In general there were seven territorial departments, although their boundaries were subject to change and they were not all in existence throughout the war. The Department of New York (later the Northern Department) was created when Congress made Philip Schuyler its commander on June 15, 1775. The Southern and Middle Departments were added in February 1776. Several others were added the same year. A major general appointed by Congress commanded each department. Under his command came all Continental Army units within the territorial limits of the department, as well as state troops and militia – if released by the governor of the state.

=== Tactical formations ===
All troops under the department commander were designated as an army; hence troops in the Northern Department were called the Northern Army, in the Southern Department the Southern Army, etc. The department commander could be field commander or he could appoint another officer to command the troops in the field. Depending on the size of the army, it could be divided into wings or divisions (of typically three brigades) that were temporary organizations, and brigades (of two to five regiments) that in effect were permanent organizations and the basic tactical unit of the Continental Army.

An infantry regiment in the Continental Army typically consisted of 8 to 10 companies, each commanded by a captain. Field officers usually included a colonel, a lieutenant colonel, and a major. A regimental staff was made up of an adjutant, quartermaster, surgeon, surgeon's mate, paymaster, and chaplain. Infantry regiments were often called simply regiments or battalions. The regiment's fighting strength consisted of a single battalion of 728 officers and enlisted men at full strength. Cavalry and artillery regiments were organized in a similar manner. A company of cavalry was frequently called a troop. An artillery company contained specialized soldiers, such as bombardiers, gunners, and matrosses. A continental cavalry regiment had a nominal strength of 280 officers and men, but the actual strength was usually less than 150 men and even fewer horses. Artificers were civilian or military mechanics and artisans employed by the army to provide services. They included blacksmiths, coopers, carpenters, harnessmakers, and wheelwrights.

=== Logistical organization ===
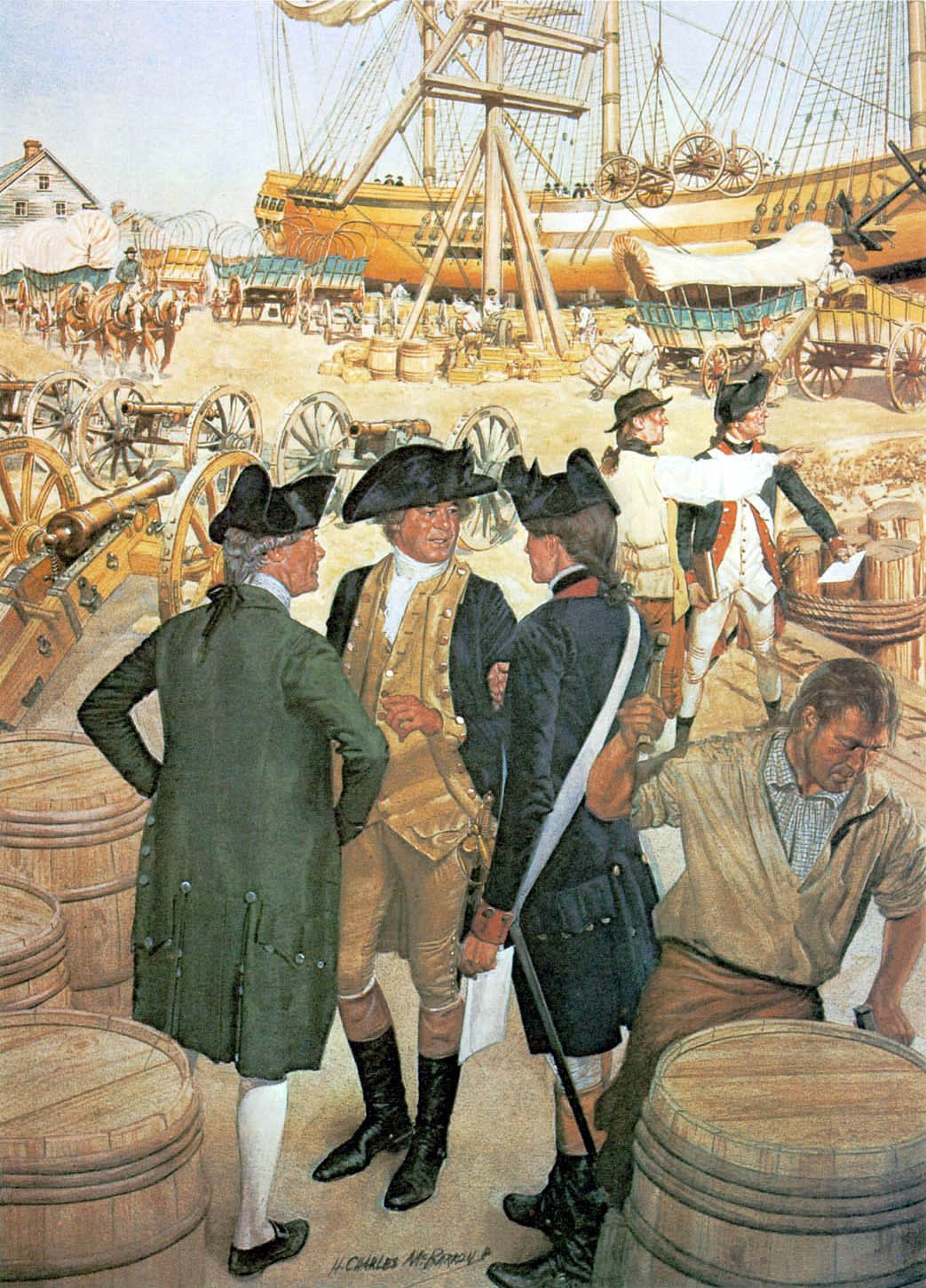
An illustration of the Continental Army's Assistant Quartermaster General John Parke and Ezekiel Cheever, civilian commissary of artillery, giving instructions to a captain of artillery on the docks of New London, Connecticut in 1776

In June 1775, the Second Continental Congress created the position of Quartermaster General, after the British example. He was charged with opening and maintaining the lines of advance and retreat, laying out camps and assigning quarters. His responsibilities included furnishing the army with materiel and supplies, although the supply of arms, clothing, and provisions fell under other departments. The transportation of all supplies, even those provided by other departments, came under his ambit. The Quartermaster General served with the main army under General George Washington, but was directly responsible to Congress. Deputy quartermasters were appointed by Congress to serve with separate armies, and functioned independently of the Quartermaster General. Thomas Mifflin served as Quartermaster General (1775–1776 and 1776–1778), Stephen Moylan (1776), Nathanael Greene (1778–1780), and Timothy Pickering (from 1780).

Congress also created the position of Commissary General of Stores and Provisions directly responsible to Congress, with Joseph Trumbull as the first incumbent. In 1777, Congress divided the department into two, a Commissary General of Purchases, with four deputies, and a Commissary General of Issues, with three deputies. William Buchanan was head of the Purchase Department (1777–1778), Jeremiah Wadsworth (1778–1779), and Ephraim Blaine (1779–1781). In 1780, the department became subordinated to the Superintendent of Finance, although Blaine retained his position. Charles Stewart served as Commissary General of Issues (1777–1782).

The responsibility for procuring arms and ammunition at first rested with various committees of Congress. In 1775, a field organization, usually known as the Military Branch of the Commissariat of Military Stores, was made responsible for distribution and care of ordnance in the field. In 1777, Congress established a Commissary General of Military Stores. Known as the Civil Branch, this organization was responsible for handling arsenals, laboratories, and some procurement under the general supervision of the Board of War. Later in the war, a Surveyor of Ordnance was made responsible for inspecting foundries, magazines, ordnance shops, and field ordnance. In July 1777, the Board of War was authorized to purchase artillery.

Congress created a hospital department in July 1775 as a part of the Continental Army's administrative structure. It came under the Director General of the Hospital Department, chosen by Congress but serving under the Commander in Chief, and was staffed by four surgeons, an apothecary, twenty surgeon's mates, a nurse for every ten patients, a matron to supervise the nurses, a clerk, and two storekeepers. The department was reorganized in 1777; deputy director generals were added to the administrative structure; commissaries of hospitals were established to provide food and forage; and apothecary generals were established to procure and distribute medicines. The first director general was Benjamin Church (1775), he was followed by John Morgan (1775–1777), William Shippen (1777–1781), and John Cochran (1781).

Keeping the continentals clothed was a difficult task and to do this Washington appointed James Mease, a merchant from Philadelphia, as Clothier General. Mease worked closely with state-appointed agents to purchase clothing and things such as cow hides to make clothing and shoes for soldiers. Mease eventually resigned in 1777 and had compromised much of the organization of the Clothing Department. After this, on many accounts, the soldiers of the Continental Army were often poorly clothed, had few blankets, and often did not even have shoes. The problems with clothing and shoes for soldiers were often not the result of not having enough but of organization and lack of transportation. To reorganize, the Board of War was appointed to sort out the clothing supply chain. During this time they sought out the help of France, and for the remainder of the war clothing was coming from over-sea procurement.

The disbursing of money to pay soldiers and suppliers were the function of the Paymaster-General. James Warren was the first incumbent of this office. His successor was William Palfrey in 1776, who was followed by John Pierce Jr. in 1781.

== Officers and men ==
Continental Army Strength
Year	January	July	December
1775	-	23 239	21 535
1776	15 608	25 606	11 423
1777	..	..	25 985
1778	20 868	28 638	33 411
1779	33 535	26 394	18 700
1780	21 261	15 674	8 742
1781	6 853	10 265	..
1782	10 687	12 392	13 973
1783	12 031	2 760; June	-

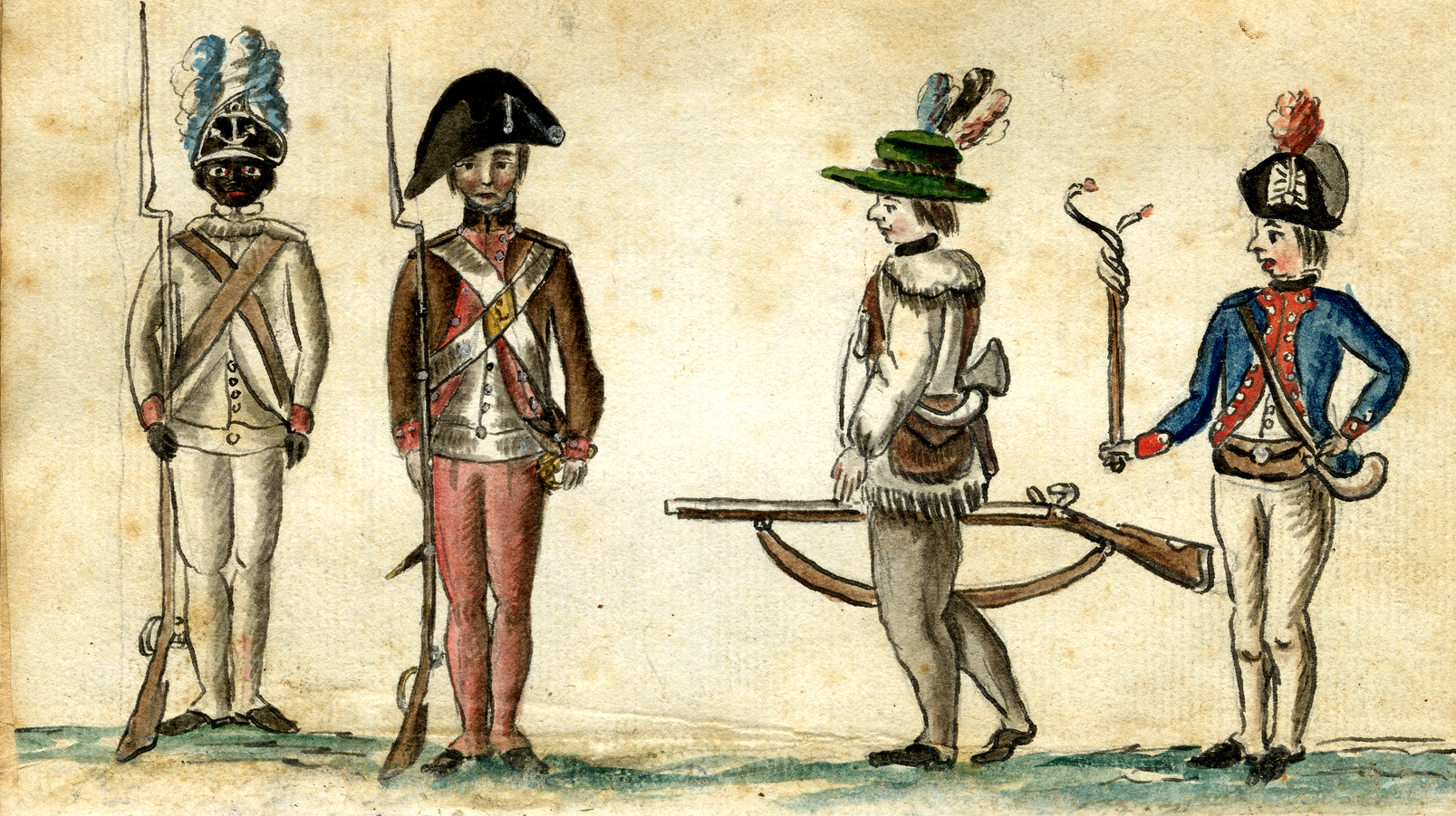
1781 illustration of Continental Army soldiers during the Yorktown campaign, including a black infantryman (on the far left) from the Rhode Island Regiment, one of the regiments in the Continental Army with the largest number of black patriot soldiers. An estimated four percent of the Continental Army were black.

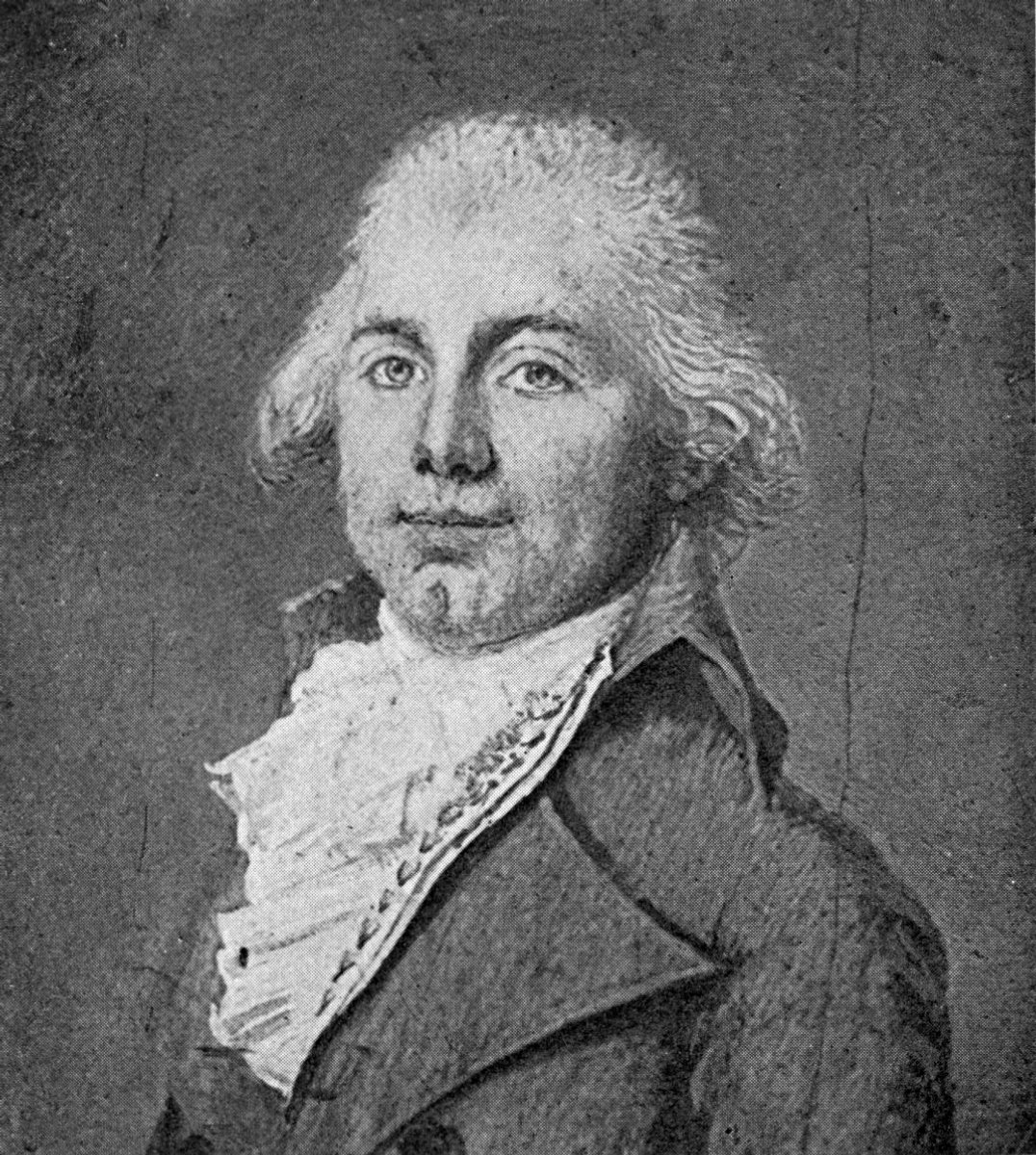
James Monroe, along with George Washington, one of the two future U.S. presidents who served in the Continental Army

The Continental Army lacked the discipline typically expected of an army. When they first assembled, the count of how many soldiers George Washington had was delayed a little over a week. Instead of obeying their commanders and officers without question, each unit was a community that had democratically chosen its leaders. The regiments came from different states and, because they were composed of volunteers, were uneven in numbers. While this could have been remedied by reassigning soldiers, many held a belief borne of American republicanism - if separated from the officers they had chosen, soldiers did not believe they should have to serve. Relying on the willingness of his volunteer army to fight, George Washington had to sacrifice this logistical weakness in favor of compromise.

Soldiers in the Continental Army were volunteers; they agreed to serve in the army and standard enlistment periods lasted from one to three years. Early in the war, the enlistment periods were short, as the Continental Congress feared the possibility of the Continental Army evolving into a permanent army. The army never numbered more than 48,000 men overall and 13,000 troops in one area. The turnover proved a constant problem, particularly in the winter of 1776–1777, and longer enlistments were approved. As the new country (not yet fully independent) had no money, the government agreed to give grants to the soldiers which they could exchange for money. In 1781 and 1782, Patriot officials and officers in the Southern Colonies repeatedly implemented policies that offered slaves as rewards for recruiters who managed to enlist a certain number of volunteers in the Continental Army; in January 1781, Virginia's General Assembly passed a measure which announced that voluntary enlistees in the Virginia Line's regiments would be given a "healthy sound negro" as a reward.

The officers of both the Continental Army and the state militias were typically yeoman farmers with a sense of honor and status and an ideological commitment to oppose the policies of the British Crown. Meanwhile, the enlisted men largely came from the working class or minority groups, namely English, Ulster Protestant, or African descent. Up to a fourth of Washington's army were of Scots-Irish (English and Scottish descent) Ulster origin, many being recent arrivals and in need of work. They were motivated to volunteer by specific contracts that promised bounty money; regular pay at good wages; food, clothing, and medical care; companionship; and the promise of land ownership after the war. By 1780, more than 30,000 men served in the Continental army, but the lack of resources and proper training resulted in the deaths of over 13,000 soldiers. By 1781–1782, threats of mutiny and actual mutinies were becoming serious.

The Continental Army was racially integrated, a condition the United States Army would not see again until the late 1940s. During the Revolution, African American slaves were promised freedom in exchange for military service by both the Continental and British armies. Approximately 6,600 people of color (including African American, indigenous, and multiracial men) served with the colonial forces, and made up one-fifth of the Northern Continental Army.

In addition to the Continental Army regulars, state militia units were assigned for short-term service and fought in campaigns throughout the war. Sometimes the militia units operated independently of the Continental Army, but often local militias were called out to support and augment the Continental Army regulars during campaigns. The militia troops developed a reputation for being prone to premature retreats, a fact that General Daniel Morgan integrated into his strategy at the Battle of Cowpens and used to fool the British in 1781.

The financial responsibility for providing pay, food, shelter, clothing, arms, and other equipment to specific units was assigned to states as part of the establishment of these units. States differed in how well they lived up to these obligations. There were constant funding issues and morale problems as the war continued. This led to the army offering low pay, often rotten food, hard work, cold, heat, poor clothing and shelter, harsh discipline, and a high chance of becoming a casualty.

== Operations ==
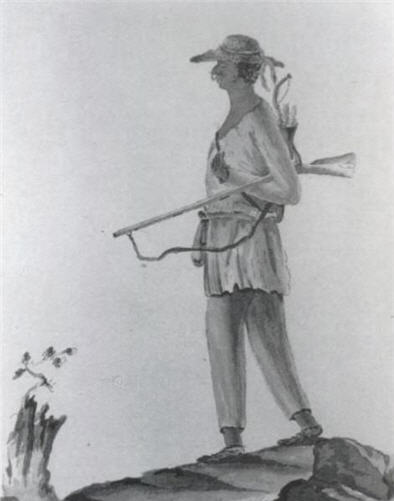
A 1778 illustration showing a Stockbridge Mohican Indian patriot soldier with the Stockbridge Militia in Stockbridge, Massachusetts, taken from Hessian officer Johann Von Ewald's war diary

During the siege of Boston in June 1775, the Continental Army in Cambridge, Massachusetts is estimated to have numbered between 14,000 and 16,000 men from New England, though the actual number may have been as low as 11,000 because of desertions. Until George Washington's arrival in Cambridge, the Continental Army was commanded by Artemas Ward. The British Army in Boston was increasing by fresh arrivals, then numbering about 10,000 men. The British controlled Boston and defended it with their fleet, but they were outnumbered and did not attempt to challenge the American control of New England. Washington selected young Henry Knox, a self-educated strategist, to take charge of the artillery from an abandoned British fort in upstate New York, and dragged across the snow to and placed them in the hills surrounding Boston in March 1776. The British situation was untenable. They negotiated an uneventful abandonment of the city and relocated their forces to Halifax in Canada. Washington relocated his army to New York. For the next five years, the main bodies of the Continental and British armies campaigned against one another in New York, New Jersey, and Pennsylvania. These campaigns included the notable battles of Trenton, Princeton, Brandywine, Germantown, and Morristown, and others.

The army increased its effectiveness and success rate through a series of trials and errors, often at a great human cost. General Washington and other distinguished officers were instrumental leaders in preserving unity, learning and adapting, and ensuring discipline throughout the eight years of war. In the winter of 1777–1778, with the addition of Baron von Steuben, a Prussian expert, the training and discipline of the Continental Army was dramatically upgraded to modern European standards through the Regulations for the Order and Discipline of the Troops of the United States. This was during the infamous winter at Valley Forge. Washington always viewed the Army as a temporary measure and strove to maintain civilian control of the military, as did the Continental Congress, though there were minor disagreements about how this was to be carried out.

Throughout its existence, the Army was troubled by poor logistics, inadequate training, short-term enlistments, interstate rivalries, and Congress's inability to compel the states to provide food, money, or supplies. In the beginning, soldiers enlisted for a year, largely motivated by patriotism; but as the war dragged on, bounties and other incentives became more commonplace. Major and minor mutinies—56 in all—diminished the reliability of two of the main units late in the war. Discipline could be harsh and General Washington was said to have "approved hundreds of death sentences by either hanging or firing squad".

The French played a decisive role in 1781 as Washington's Army was augmented by a French expeditionary force under Lieutenant General Rochambeau and a squadron of the French navy under the Comte de Barras. By disguising his movements, Washington moved the combined forces south to Virginia without the British commanders in New York realizing it. This resulted in the capture of the main British invasion force in the south at the Siege of Yorktown, which resulted in the American and their allied victory in the land war in North America and assured independence.

== Campaigns ==
Casualties and losses
Year	KIA	Wounded	POW	MIA
1775	323	436	519	5
1776	600	562	5365	1
1777	1493	2053	2084	38
1778	753	443	1212	139
1779	657	824	859	18
1780	984	1886	4661	9
1781	1003	1454	761	1216
1782	277	124	80	0
1783	0	1	1	0

- Boston
- Quebec
- First Charleston
- Long Island
- Trenton
- Princeton
- Saratoga
- Brandywine
- Germantown
- Monmouth
- First Savannah
- Second Savannah
- Second Charleston
- Cowpens
- Guilford Court House
- Yorktown

== Encampments ==
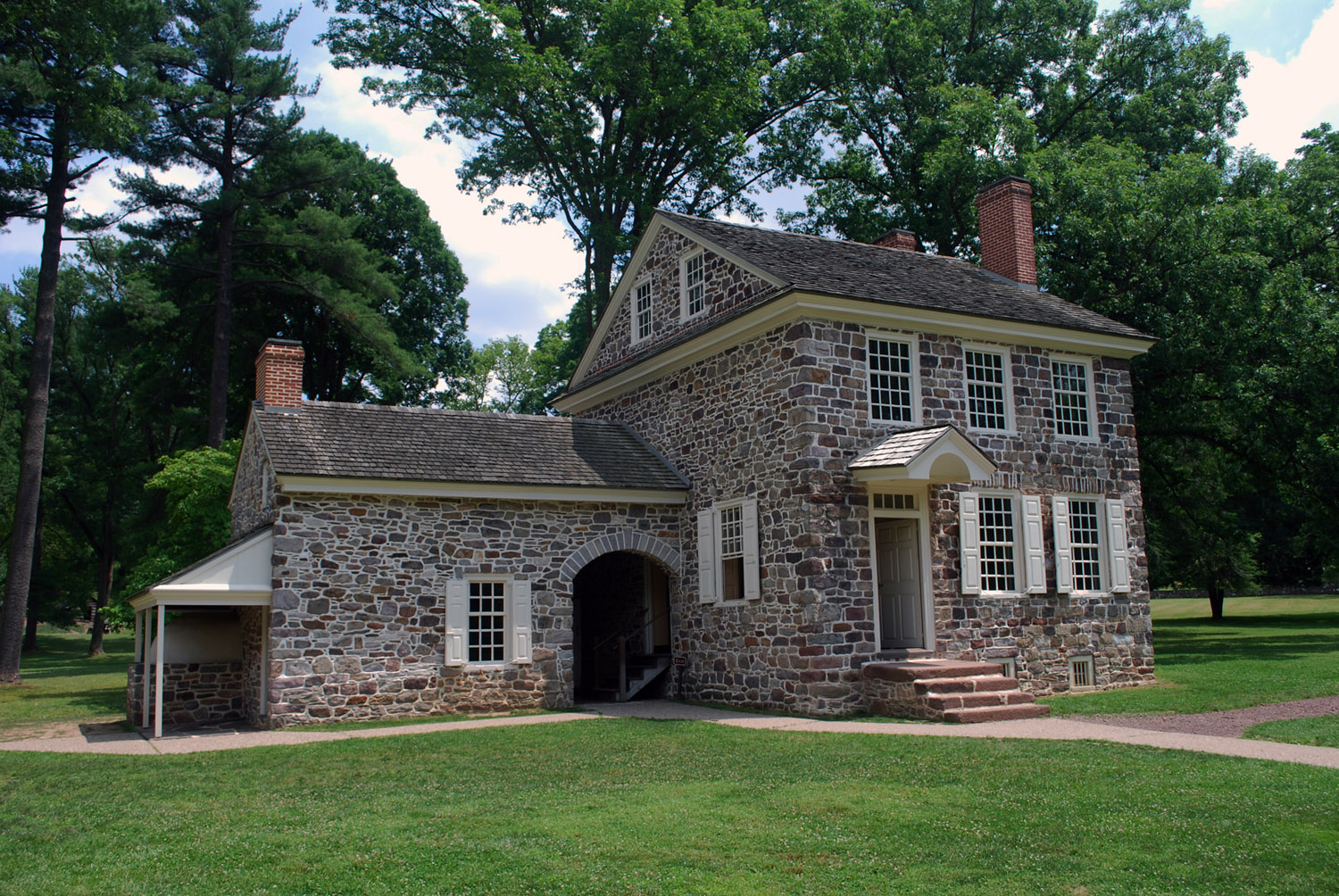
Washington's headquarters in Valley Forge, Pennsylvania, which is still standing, one of the centerpieces of Valley Forge National Historical Park

- Cambridge, Massachusetts, 1775–1776
- Loantaka Valley, Morristown, New Jersey, January 1777 – May 1777.
- Valley Forge, Pennsylvania, December 1777 – June 1778.
- Main Army at Middlebrook, New Jersey, December 1778 – June 1779.
  - Main Army Artillery at Pluckemin, New Jersey, 1778–1789.
  - Eastern Division at Redding Connecticut, 1778–1779.
- Jockey Hollow, Morristown, New Jersey, December 1779 – June 1780.
- West Point, New York, 1780–1781
  - Pennsylvania Line at Jockey Hollow, Morristown, New Jersey, 1780–1781.
- Newburgh, New York, 1781–1782
  - New Jersey Brigade at Bernardsville, New Jersey, 1781–1782.
- New Windsor, New York, October 1782 – June 1783.
  - Washington's Headquarters at Newburgh, New York, 1782–1783.

== Disbandment ==
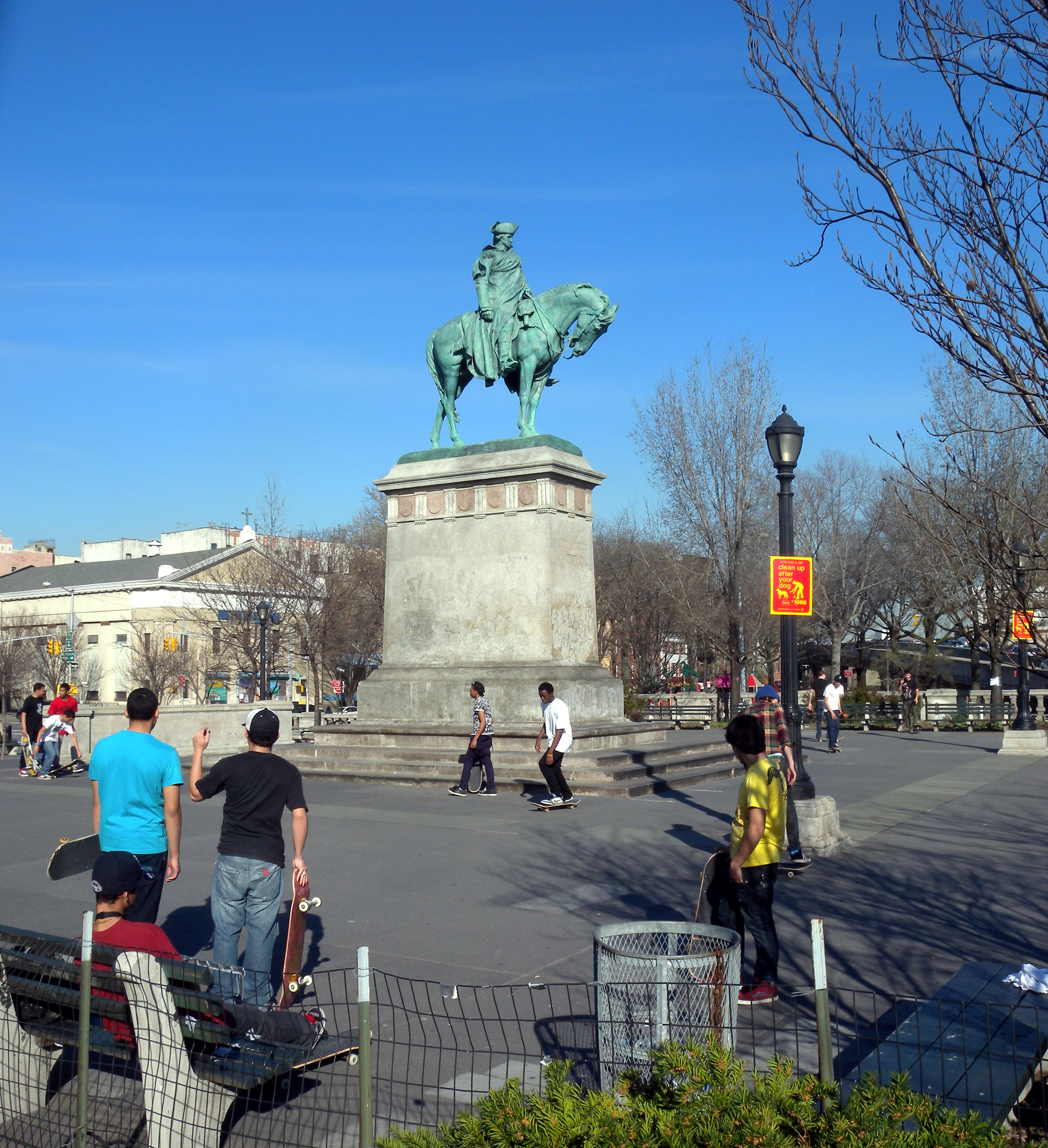
Continental Army Plaza in the Williamsburg section of Brooklyn in New York City

A small residual force remained at West Point and some frontier outposts until Congress created the United States Army by their resolution of June 3, 1784. Although Congress declined on May 12 to make a decision on the peace establishment, it did address the need for some troops to remain on duty until the British evacuated New York City and several frontier posts. The delegates told Washington to use men enlisted for fixed terms as temporary garrisons. A detachment of those men from West Point reoccupied New York without incident on November 25. When Steuben's effort in July to negotiate a transfer of frontier forts with Major General Frederick Haldimand collapsed, however, the British maintained control over them, as they would into the 1790s. That failure and the realization that most of the remaining infantrymen's enlistments were due to expire by June 1784 led Washington to order Knox, his choice as the commander of the peacetime army, to discharge all but 500 infantry and 100 artillerymen before winter set in. The former regrouped as 1st American Regiment, under Colonel Henry Jackson of Massachusetts. The single artillery company, New Yorkers under Major John Doughty, came from remnants of the 2nd Continental Artillery Regiment.

Congress issued a proclamation on October 18, 1783, which approved Washington's reductions. On November 2, Washington, then at Rockingham near Rocky Hill, New Jersey, released his Farewell Orders issued to the Armies of the United States of America to the Philadelphia newspapers for nationwide distribution to the furloughed men. In the message, he thanked the officers and men for their assistance and reminded them that "the singular interpositions of Providence in our feeble condition were such, as could scarcely escape the attention of the most unobserving; while the unparalleled perseverance of the Armies of the United States, through almost every possible suffering and discouragement for the space of eight long years, was little short of a standing Miracle."

Washington believed that the blending of persons from every colony into "one patriotic band of Brothers" had been a major accomplishment, and he urged the veterans to continue this devotion in civilian life. Washington said farewell to his remaining officers on December 4 at Fraunces Tavern in New York City. On December 23 he appeared in Congress, then sitting at Annapolis, and returned his commission as Commander in Chief: "Having now finished the work assigned me, I retire from the great theatre of Action; and bidding an Affectionate farewell to this August body under whose orders I have so long acted, I here offer my Commission, and take my leave of all the employments of public life." Congress ended the War of American Independence on January 14, 1784, by ratifying the definitive peace treaty that had been signed in Paris on September 3.

== Uniforms and insignia ==
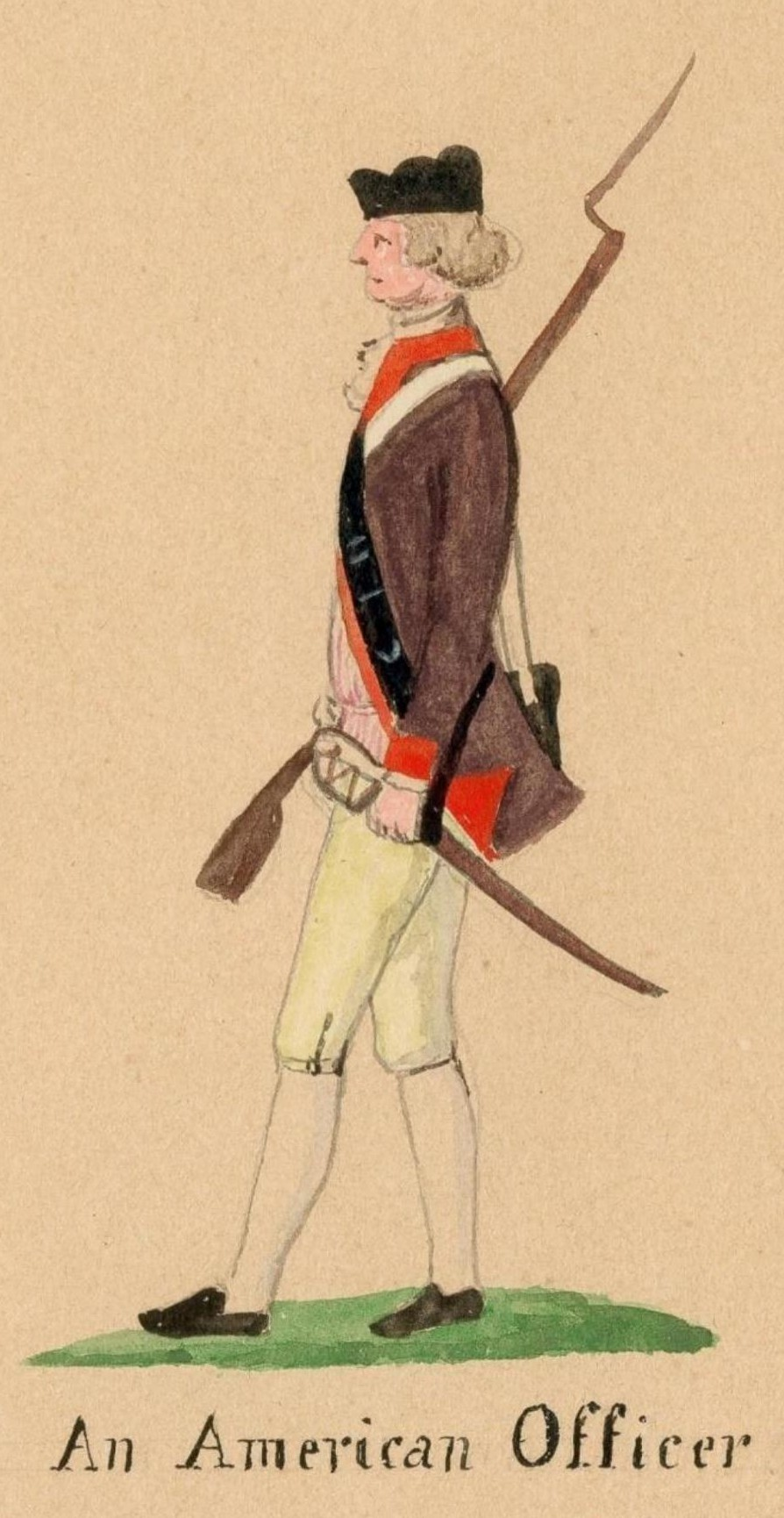

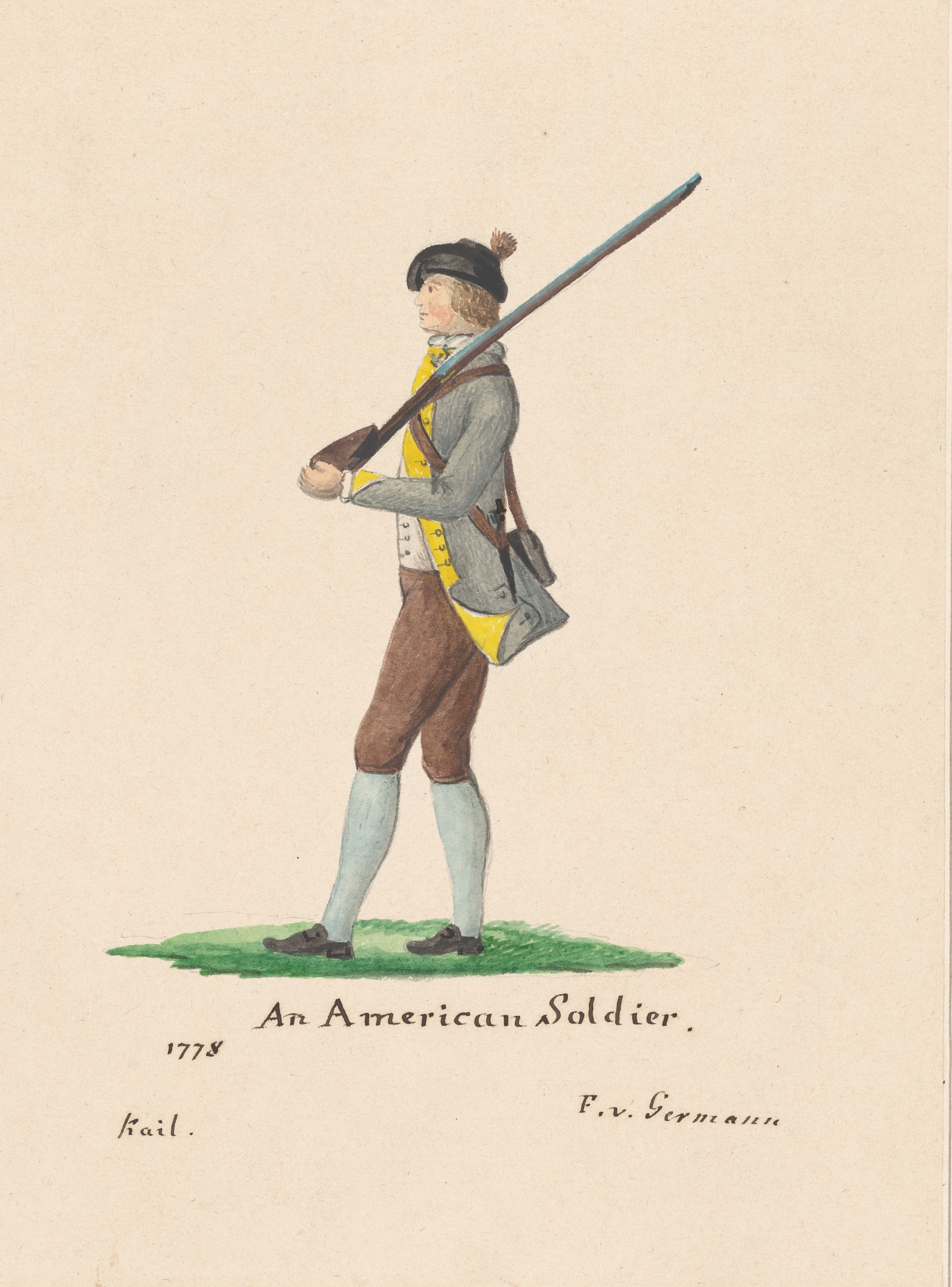

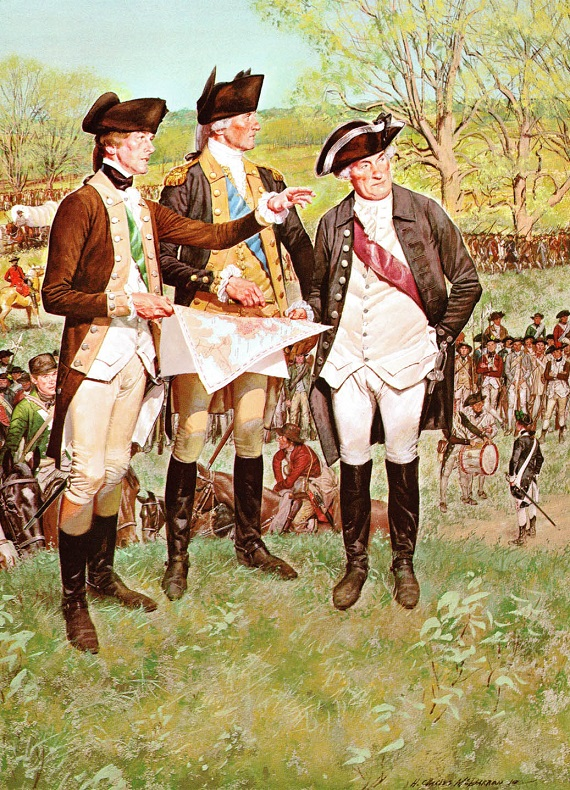
An aide-de-camp with the green ribbon is seen to the left. General Washington with a light blue sash on his breast denotes his rank as "Commander in Chief." In the right foreground is Major General Artemas Ward with the purple sash of a brigadier general.

=== Rank and pay ===
Monthly pay of the officers and soldiers of the continental line as established by the resolutions of Congress, fixing the arrangement of the Continental Army May 27, 1778, which rate of pay continued to the end of the war.

Infantry
Rank	Pay per month (dollars)	Rank	Pay per month (dollars)
Colonel	75	Sergeant Major	10
Lieutenant Colonel	60	Quartermaster Sergeant	10
Major	50	Sergeant	10
Captain	40	Drum Major	9 1/2
Captain Lieutenant	26 2/3	Fife Major	9
Lieutenant	26 2/3	Drummer, Fifer	7 1/2
Ensign	20	Corporal	7 1/2
Surgeon	60	Private	6 2/3
Surgeon's Mate	40		
Paymasters 20 dollars, Adjutants 13 dollars, Quartermasters 13 dollars, in addition to their pay as officers of the line.

Cavalry
Rank	Pay per month (dollars)	Rank	Pay per month (dollars)
Colonel	93¾	Quartermaster Sergeant	15
Lieutenant Colonel	75	Sergeant	15
Major	60	Trumpet Major	11
Captain	50	Trumpeter	10
Lieutenant	33 1/3	Corporal	10
Cornet	26 2/3	Dragoon	8 1/3
Surgeon	60	Saddler	10
Surgeon's Mate	40	Farrier	10
Riding Master	33 1/3		
Paymasters 25 dollars, Adjutants 15 dollars, Quartermasters 15 dollars, in addition to their pay as officers of the line.

Artillery
Rank	Pay per month (dollars)	Rank	Pay per month (dollars)
Colonel	100	Sergeant Major	11^{23}/^{90}
Lieutenant Colonel	75	Quartermaster Sergeant	11^{23}/^{90}
Major	62 1/2	Drum Major	10^{33}/^{90}
Captain	50	Fife Major	10^{33}/^{90}
Captain Lieutenant	33 1/3	Sergeant	10
First Lieutenant	33 1/3	Bombardier	9
Second Lieutenant	33 1/3	Corporal	9
Surgeon	75	Gunner	8 2/3
Surgeon's Mate	50	Drummers, Fifers	8 2/3
		Matross	8 1/3
Paymasters 25 dollars, Adjutants 16 dollars, Quartermasters 16 dollars, in addition to their pay as officers of the line.

Engineers
Rank	Pay per month (dollars)	Rank	Pay per month (dollars)
Captain	50	Sergeant	10
Lieutenant	33 1/3	Corporal	9
		Private	8 1/3
Aid-de-camp 24 dollars, Brigade Quartermaster 24 dollars, Brigade Major 15 dollars, in addition to their pay as officers of the line.

Provosts
Rank	Pay per month (dollars)	Rank	Pay per month (dollars)
Captain of provosts	50	Sergeant	15
Lieutenant	33 1/3	Trumpeter	10
Clerk	33 1/3	Provost or private	8 1/3
		Executioner	10

=== Rank insignia ===
The Continental Army initially wore ribbons, cockades, and epaulettes of various colors as an ad hoc form of rank insignia, as General George Washington wrote in 1775:

"As the Continental Army has unfortunately no uniforms in 1775, and consequently many inconveniences must arise from not being able to distinguish the commissioned officers from the privates, it is desired that some badge of distinction be immediately provided; for instance that the field officers may have red or pink colored cockades in their hats, the captains yellow or buff, and the subalterns green."

In 1776, captains were to have buff or white cockades.

Rank insignia in 1775

	General officers				Field officers	Junior officers		Non-commissioned officers	
Title	General and Commander in Chief	Major general	Brigadier general	Aide-de-camp	Colonel, Lieutenant colonel, Major	Captain	Lieutenant, Ensign	Sergeant	Corporal
Insignia									

Later on in the war, the Continental Army established its own uniform with a black and white cockade among all ranks. Infantry officers had silver and other branches gold insignia:

Rank insignia in 1780

For commissioned officers, metal epaulettes were introduced by a general order dated June 18, 1780 (except for those of the CIC). For non-commissioned officers, cloth epaulettes were prescribed since a general order dated July 23, 1775. That order differentiated only between the ranks of serjeant and corporal. At the end of the war, the serjeant-major was recognizable by a pair of cloth epaulettes. The number, position, and color of the NCO-epaulettes were changed several times.

	General officers			Field officers			Junior officers		Non-commissioned officers			Enlisted
Title	Commander in Chief	Major general	Brigadier general	Colonel	Lieutenant colonel	Major	Captain	Subaltern	Sergeant major Quartermaster sergeant Drum major Fife major	Sergeant	Corporal	Private
Insignia												No insignia

== See also ==
- List of infantry weapons in the American Revolution
