= General Bower =

General Bower may refer to:

- Hamilton Bower (1858–1940), British Indian Army major general
- Roger Bower (1903–1990), British Army lieutenant general

== See also ==
- Verne L. Bowers (1919–2020), U.S. Army major general
