= Timothy Pickering =

U.S. statesman and secessionist (1745–1829)

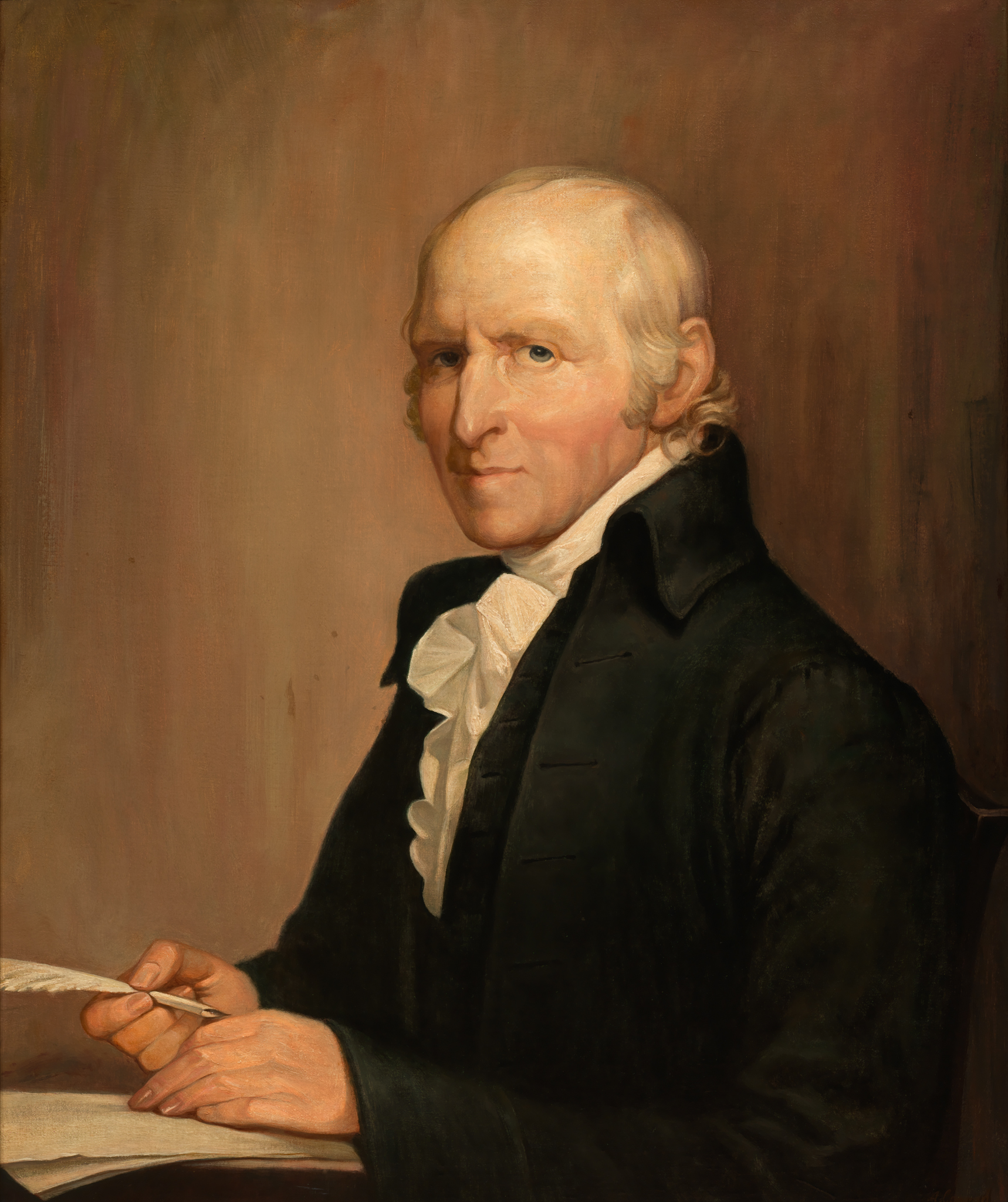
- Portrait by Gilbert Stuart

3rd United States Secretary of State
- In office December 10, 1795 – May 12, 1800; Ad interim: August 20 – December 10, 1795
- President: George Washington; John Adams
- Preceded by: Edmund Randolph
- Succeeded by: John Marshall

2nd United States Secretary of War
- In office January 2, 1795 – December 10, 1795
- President: George Washington
- Preceded by: Henry Knox
- Succeeded by: James McHenry

5th United States Postmaster General
- In office August 12, 1791 – January 1, 1795
- President: George Washington
- Preceded by: Samuel Osgood
- Succeeded by: Joseph Habersham

United States Senator from Massachusetts
- In office March 4, 1803 – March 3, 1811
- Preceded by: Dwight Foster
- Succeeded by: Joseph Bradley Varnum

Member of the U.S. House of Representatives from Massachusetts
- In office March 4, 1813 – March 3, 1817
- Preceded by: Leonard White
- Succeeded by: Nathaniel Silsbee
- Constituency: 3rd district (1813–15); 2nd district (1815–17)

Personal details
- Born: July 17, 1745 Salem, Massachusetts Bay, British America
- Died: January 29, 1829 (aged 83) Salem, Massachusetts, U.S.
- Party: Federalist
- Children: John Pickering (linguist)
- Education: Harvard College (BA)

Military service
- Allegiance: United States
- Branch/service: Massachusetts militia Continental Army; United States Army
- Years of service: 1766–1785
- Rank: Colonel
- Battles/wars: American Revolutionary War

Timothy Pickering (July 17, 1745 – January 29, 1829) was an American politician and jurist who served as the third United States secretary of state, serving under Presidents George Washington and John Adams. He also represented Massachusetts in both houses of Congress as a member of the Federalist Party. In 1795, he was elected a member of the American Philosophical Society.

Born in Salem in the Province of Massachusetts Bay, Pickering began a legal career after graduating from Harvard College. He won election to the Massachusetts General Court and served as a county judge. He also became an officer in the colonial militia and served in the siege of Boston during the early stages of the American Revolutionary War. Later in the war, he was Adjutant General and Quartermaster General of the Continental Army. After the war, Pickering moved to the Wyoming Valley of Pennsylvania and took part in the then colony's 1787 ratifying convention for the United States Constitution.

President Washington appointed Pickering to the position of Postmaster General in 1791. After briefly serving as Secretary of War, Pickering became the Secretary of State in 1795, and remained in that office after President Adams was inaugurated. As Secretary of State, Pickering favored close relations with Britain. President Adams dismissed him in 1800 due to Pickering's opposition to peace with France during the Quasi-War.

Pickering won election to represent Massachusetts in the United States Senate in 1803, becoming an ardent opponent of the Embargo Act of 1807. He continued to support Britain in the Napoleonic Wars, famously describing the country as "The World's last hope – Britain's Fast-anchored Isle." He left the Senate in 1811 but served in the United States House of Representatives from 1813 to 1817. During the War of 1812, he became a leader of the New England secession movement and helped organize the Hartford Convention. The fallout from the convention ended Pickering's political career. He lived as a farmer in Salem until his death in 1829.

== Early life ==
Coat of Arms of Timothy Pickering

Pickering was born in Salem, Massachusetts to Deacon Timothy and Mary Wingate Pickering. He was one of nine children and the younger brother of John Pickering (not to be confused with the New Hampshire judge) who would eventually serve as Speaker of the Massachusetts House of Representatives. He attended grammar school in Salem and graduated from Harvard College in 1763. Salem minister William Bentley noted on Pickering: "From his youth his townsmen proclaim him assuming, turbulent, & headstrong."

After graduating from Harvard, Pickering returned to Salem where he began working for John Higginson, the town clerk and Essex County register of deeds. Pickering was admitted to the Massachusetts Bar in 1768 and, in 1774, he succeeded Higginson as register of deeds. Soon after, he was elected to represent Salem in the Massachusetts General Court and served as a justice in the Essex County Court of Common Pleas. On April 8, 1766, he married Rebecca White of Salem.

In January 1766, Pickering was commissioned a lieutenant in the Essex County militia. He was promoted to captain three years later. In 1769, he published his ideas on drilling soldiers in the Essex Gazette. These were published in 1775 as "An Easy Plan for a Militia." The manual was used as the Continental Army drill book until replaced by Baron von Steuben's Regulations for the Order and Discipline of the Troops of the United States

== American Revolutionary War ==
=== Salem incident ===
On February 26, 1775, men under Pickering's command were involved in one of the earliest military engagements in the American Revolution, a confrontation locally referred to as "Leslie's Retreat." A detachment of British regulars under British Army Lt. Colonel Alexander Leslie was dispatched from Boston to search North Salem for contraband artillery. Leslie's men were thwarted from crossing the North River bridge and searching the outlying farms by Pickering's militia and citizens of Salem. Many of these "citizens" were members of Salem's North Church, which was just a short distance from the North Bridge. Col. Leslie chose a Sunday morning to raid Salem knowing that the citizens would be attending church. They were, of course, but the Rev. Thomas Barnard Jr. of the North Church famously left his pulpit that morning to meet the British troops at the bridge. A fast rider from Marblehead had ridden ahead of the British to warn Mr. Barnard. Barnard is credited with convincing Col. Leslie to retreat in peace. If he had not, Pickering's troops would have fired the "shot heard 'round the world" and started the war. Two months later, Pickering's troops marched to take part in the Battles of Lexington and Concord but arrived too late to play a major role. They then became part of the New England army assembling outside Boston to lay siege to the city.

=== Adjutant general ===
In December 1776, he led a well-drilled regiment of the Essex County militia to New York, where General George Washington took notice and offered Pickering the position of adjutant general of the Continental Army in 1777 with the rank of colonel. In this capacity he oversaw the building of the Great chain which was forged at the Stirling Iron Works. The chain blocked the Royal Navy from proceeding up the Hudson River past West Point and protected that important fort from attack for the duration of the conflict.

He was widely praised for his work in supplying the troops during the remainder of the conflict. In August 1780, the Continental Congress elected Pickering Quartermaster General.

== Rise to power ==
After the end of the American Revolution, Pickering made several failed attempts at financial success. In 1783, he embarked on a mercantile partnership with Samuel Hodgdon that failed two years later. In 1786, he moved to the Wyoming Valley in Pennsylvania where he assumed a series of offices at the head of Luzerne County. When he attempted to settle a controversy generated by John Armstrong who was antagonizing Connecticut settlers living in the area, Pickering was captured and held hostage for nineteen days. In 1787, he was part of the Pennsylvania convention held to consider ratification of the United States Constitution.

After the first of Pickering's two successful attempts to make money speculating in Pennsylvania frontier land, President Washington appointed him commissioner to the Iroquois; and Pickering represented the United States in the negotiation of the Treaty of Canandaigua with the Iroquois in 1794.

== Cabinet member ==
Washington brought Pickering into the government as Postmaster General in 1791. He remained in Washington's cabinet and then that of John Adams for nine years, serving as postmaster general until 1795, Secretary of War for a brief time in 1795, then Secretary of State from 1795 to 1800. As Secretary of State he is most remembered for his strong Federalist Party attachments to British causes, even willingness to wage war with France in service of these causes during the Adams administration. In 1799 Pickering hired Joseph Dennie as his private secretary.

In 1799 Pickering sailed to England on the merchantman Washington. On October 24 the French privateer Bellona attacked Washington, even though she was flying American colours. Despite the French vessel being better armed and much more heavily manned, Washington succeeded in repelling the attack.

== Middle years ==
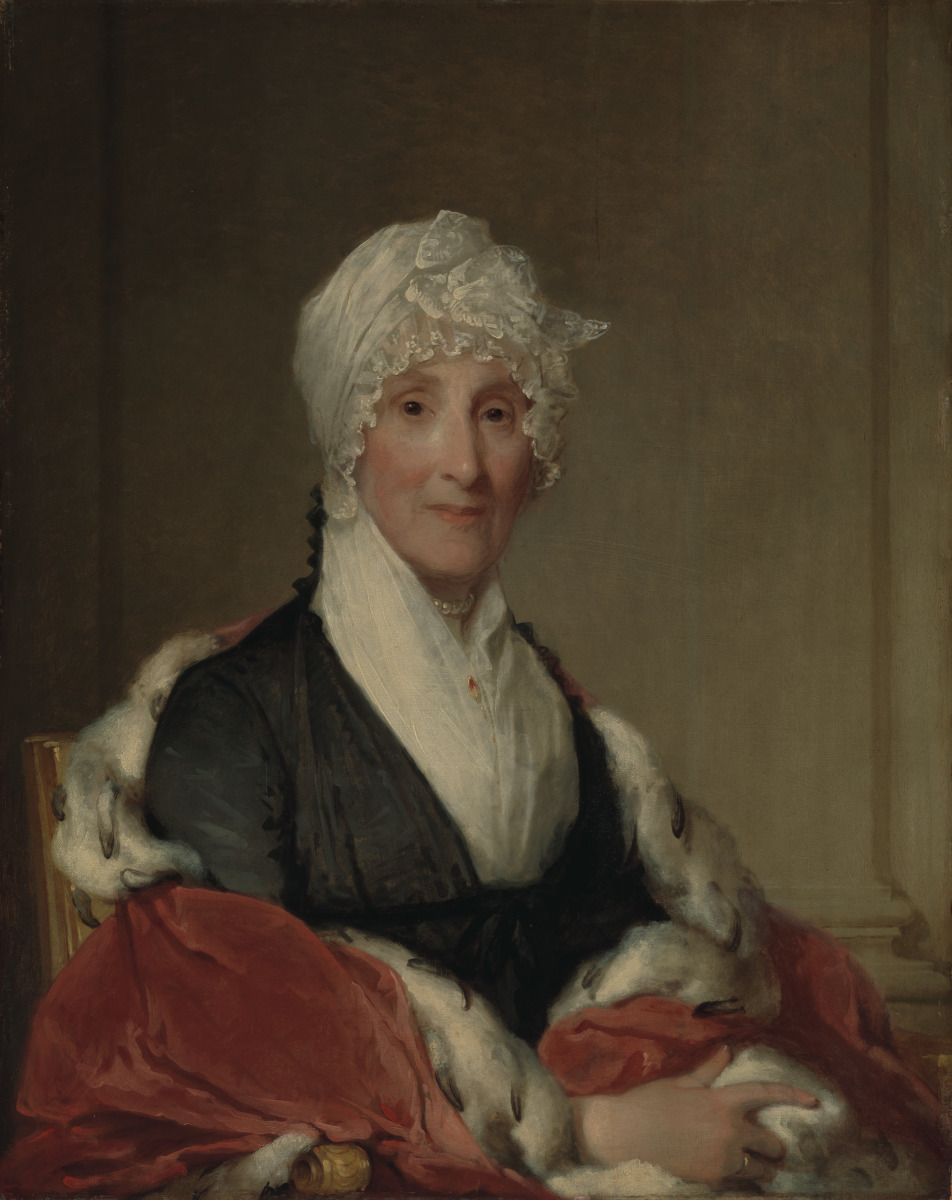
Rebecca White Pickering, portrait by Gilbert Stuart

After a quarrel with President John Adams over Adams's plan to make peace with France, Pickering was dismissed from office in May 1800. After an unsuccessful run for Congress in 1802, he was named to the United States Senate as a senator from Massachusetts in 1803 as a member of the Federalist Party. In 1804, Pickering and a band of Federalists, agitated at the lack of support for Federalists, attempted to gain support for the secession of New England and New York from the Jeffersonian United States. The plan was abandoned following Aaron Burr's defeat in the 1804 New York gubernatorial election. The irony of a Federalist moving against the national government was not lost among his dissenters. Pickering opposed the American seizure and annexation of Spanish West Florida in 1810, which he believed was both unconstitutional and an act of aggression against a friendly power.

=== Attacking Embargo policy ===
Near the end of his only term as a senator, Pickering challenged Jefferson's Embargo Act, reviving his plan for a convention of the New England states to oppose the act and potentially secede from the union. He held several conferences with the special British envoy George Rose and proposed the creation of a pro-British party in New England and urged Rose to persuade British Foreign Secretary George Canning to maintain his hard line against America with the hopes that Jefferson would resort to even more extreme measures, which would ultimately effect a political suicide for the Republicans. Pickering also published his open letter to the Massachusetts Republican governor, which he refused even to read; it contained harsh criticism of the Embargo Act, claimed that Jefferson had presented no real arguments for its enactment, and called for its nullification by the state legislators. Pickering was charged with reading confidential documents in an open Senate session before an injunction of secrecy had been removed. In response to that charge, the Senate censured Pickering by a vote of 20–7 on January 2, 1811.

=== Member of Congress ===
Pickering was later elected to the United States House of Representatives in the 1812 election, where he remained until 1817. His congressional career is best remembered for his leadership of the New England secession movement (see Essex Junto and the Hartford Convention). He was elected a Fellow of the American Academy of Arts and Sciences in 1815.

== Later years ==
After Pickering was denied re-election in 1816, he retired to Salem, where he lived as a farmer until his death in 1829, aged 83.

== Legacy ==
In 1798, the USS Pickering was the first brig built for the United States Revenue Cutter Service at Newburyport, Massachusetts

In 1799 Fort Pickering in Salem, Massachusetts was named for him.

In 1942, a United States Liberty ship named the SS Timothy Pickering was launched. She was lost off Sicily in 1943.

Until the 1990s, Pickering's ancestral home, the circa 1651 Pickering House, was the oldest house in the United States to be owned by the same family continually.

== See also ==
- France–United States relations
- Federalist Party
- List of United States senators expelled or censured

Military offices
Preceded by Morgan Connor	Adjutant Generals of the Army; 1777–1778	Succeeded by Alexander Scammell
Political offices
Preceded by Samuel Osgood	United States Postmaster General; 1791–1795	Succeeded by Joseph Habersham
Preceded by Henry Knox	United States Secretary of War; 1795	Succeeded by James McHenry
Preceded by Edmund Randolph	United States Secretary of State; 1795–1800	Succeeded by John Marshall
U.S. Senate
Preceded by Dwight Foster	U.S. Senator (Class 2) from Massachusetts; 1803–1811; Served alongside: John Quincy Adams, James Lloyd	Succeeded by Joseph Varnum
U.S. House of Representatives
Preceded by Leonard White	Member of the U.S. House of Representatives; Massachusetts's 3rd congressional district 1813–1815	Succeeded by Jeremiah Nelson
Preceded by William Reed	Member of the U.S. House of Representatives; Massachusetts's 2nd congressional district 1815–1817	Succeeded by Nathaniel Silsbee
