= William Edward Bergin =

United States Army general (1892–1978)

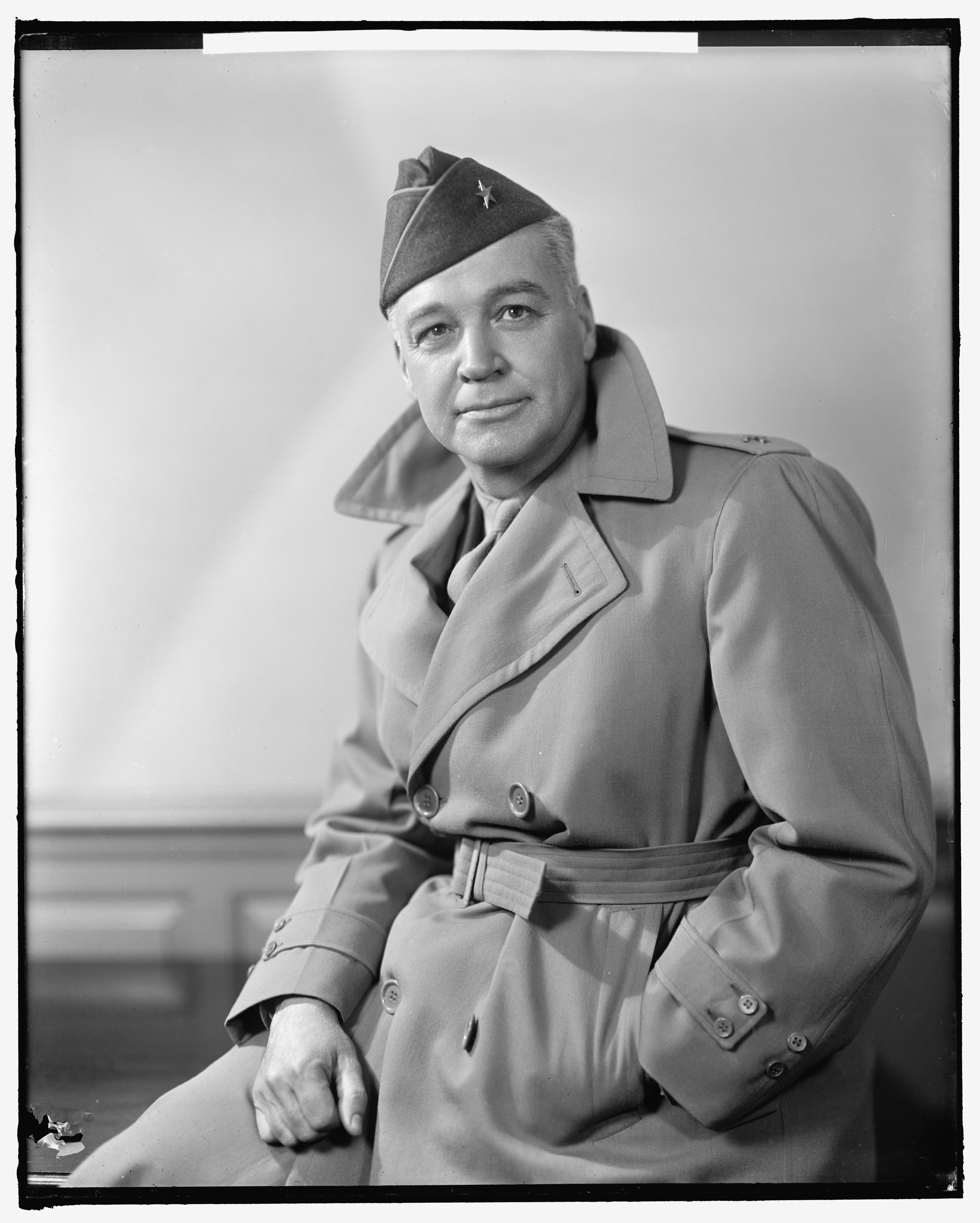
- Born: May 18, 1892; Pueblo, Colorado, US
- Died: January 23, 1978 (aged 85); Washington, D.C., US
- Burial place: Arlington National Cemetery
- Military career
- Branch: United States Army
- Service years: 1917–1954
- Rank: Major general
- Commands: Adjutant general
- Conflicts: World War I World War II; Korean War
- Awards: Distinguished Service Medal; Legion of Merit

William Edward Bergin (May 18, 1892 – January 23, 1978) was an American military officer who served as Adjutant General in the United States Army from 1951 to 1954.

== Early life and start of career ==
Bergin was born in Pueblo, Colorado on May 18, 1892, a son of John Bergin and Catherine. He joined the Army in 1917, and received his commission as a second lieutenant after graduating from officers training camp at Fort Riley, Kansas. During World War I he served in Europe with the 20th Infantry Regiment, a unit of the 10th Division .

From 1921 to 1925, Bergin was in charge of the Reserve Officers' Training Corps at Georgetown University.

== World War II ==
At the start of World War II, Bergin was adjutant and assistant chief of staff for personnel (G-1) of U.S. Army Forces in Chongqing, China, serving under General Joseph Stilwell. He later served on the Army staff for the China Burma India Theater, and he ended the war as deputy chief of staff of the Tenth U.S. Army, based in Okinawa.

== Later career ==
In 1946, Bergin was assigned to the War Department General Staff. His later assignments included overseas service in Germany and service as the Army's Deputy Adjutant General from 1949 to 1951, and Adjutant General from 1951 to 1954.

Bergin's awards included the Army Distinguished Service Medal and Legion of Merit, as well as China's Order of the Cloud and Banner First Grade.

== Retirement and death ==
In retirement, Bergin was a resident of Washington, D.C. In his later years, he suffered from heart disease. He died at his Washington home on January 23, 1978. Bergin was buried at Arlington National Cemetery. He was survived by his wife Elizabeth.

== See also ==
- List of Adjutant Generals of the U.S. Army

Military offices
Preceded by Edward F. Witsell	Adjutant General of the U. S. Army; July 1, 1951 – May 31, 1954	Succeeded by John A. Klein
