= Patricia P. Hickerson =

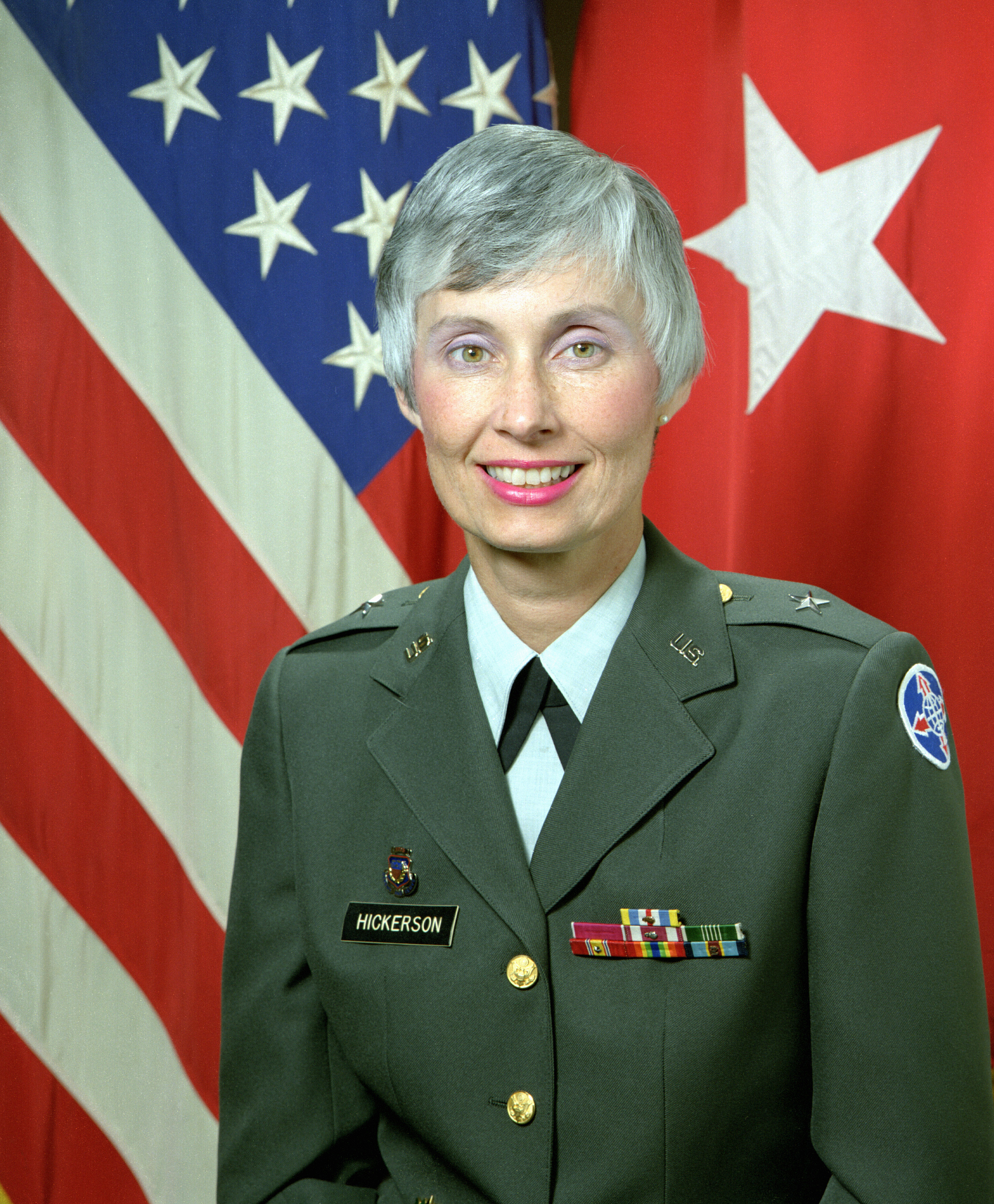
- Hickerson in 1991
- Born: September 15, 1942 (age 84); Louisville, Kentucky
- Military career
- Allegiance: United States
- Branch: United States Army
- Service years: 1968–2001
- Rank: Major General
- Commands: United States Army Soldier Support Institute; United States Army Physical Disability Agency; 38th Personnel and Administration Battalion; 14th Army Band
- Awards: Army Distinguished Service Medal; Defense Superior Service Medal (2); Legion of Merit (3); Meritorious Service Medal (5); Army Commendation Medal

Patricia Parsons Hickerson (born September 15, 1942) is a retired major general in the United States Army. She served for 32 years and was Adjutant General of the Army from 1991 to 1994. Upon her retirement in 2001, Hickerson held the rank of major general, the third woman in United States Army history to receive her second star, and the senior woman officer in the army.

== Early life and education ==
Patricia Parsons Hickerson was born on September 15, 1942, in Louisville, Kentucky, to John Millard and Rose Parsons. She attended Converse College where she received a Bachelor of Music in 1964 and later a Master of Music in 1966 as she was a classically trained flutist. Prior to her military service, she worked as a school teacher. She also graduated from the Leadership for Executives, Center for Creative Leadership along with the Program for Senior Executives, John F. Kennedy School of Government, Harvard University.

== Military career ==
After attending Converse, Hickerson participated in and graduated from the Women's Army Corps Office Basic Course in 1968, commissioning in the United States Army as a second lieutenant. When the military ended the draft in 1972, the United States Army was in need of more officers in their ranks as the Vietnam War lasted through 1975. This left an employment gap for women to fill and Hickerson fit the bill. The same year she was promoted to first lieutenant moving her way up in the ranks through her continued work and military education. She first began working as an assistant manpower control officer within the Manpower Control Division in the Military District in Washington from 1968 to 1969. Hickerson moved on to become the commander of the 14th Army Band, the only all-female band in United States military history, as a part of the United States Women's Army Corps at Fort McClellan, Alabama from 1970 to 1972. She went on to attend the Infantry Officer Advanced Course in 1973 and became one of the first two women to complete the course at Fort Benning, Georgia. After the success of Infantry school, Hickerson became a branch advisor in a Combat Service Support Branch Readiness Group in Fort Gillem, Georgia from 1973 to 1975. Hickerson went on to become an Admissions Officer at the United States Military Academy (USMA) for two years. This marked the first female officer to be on staff in the Long Grey Line's history. Her influence helped pave the way to making USMA coeducational, as the first two female cadets were admitted during her time at West Point. After her time at West Point, Hickerson attended the United States Army Command and General Staff College in 1978. She then deployed to Korea as a personal management officer in the United States Army Military Personnel Center from 1978 to 1979 and became the Deputy Chief of Staff for Personnel in the 2nd Infantry Division from 1979 to 1980.

Upon Hickerson's return to the United States, she returned to Alexandria, Virginia, for a year and moved to the Office of Assistant Secretary of Army for Manpower & Reserve Affairs from 1982 to 1983. Shortly after, Hickerson deployed overseas to Europe where she served as chief personnel actions division in the VII Corps and as the commander of the 38th Personnel and Administration Battalion from 1984 to 1986. At this point, Hickerson had become the first female command a VII Corps battalion. Following her stint in Europe, Hickerson moved back to Washington in the Office of the Joint Chief of Staff acting as the administrative assistant to chairman of Joints Chiefs of Staff from 1987 to 1989. While serving with the Joint Chief of Staff she attended and graduated from the National War College. In 1989, Hickerson returned to her alma mater where she received her honorary Doctor of Public Service. Hickerson then got stationed at United States Military Entrance Processing Command in North Chicago as the commander central sector from 1989 to 1991. She was then moved back to Alexandria where she was the adjutant general of the United States Total Army Personnel Command and later the commander of the United States Army Physical Disability Agency from 1991 to 1994. In this position, she established Army Casualty Information Processing System, later transforming into the current Defense Casualty Information Processing System. During this command, she was also assigned Director of the Pentagon Federal Credit Union from 1992 to 1994. In 1995, Hickerson became the deputy commanding general of the Recruiting Command in Kentucky for one year before becoming the commanding general of the United States Army Soldier Support Institute at Fort Jackson, South Carolina from 1995 to 1996. In 1996, she became the deputy chief of staff for the personnel management and installation management in the United States Army Forces Command at Fort McPherson, Georgia. Her final post was in Heidelberg, Germany, where she was the Deputy Chief of Staff of Personnel and Installation Management for the United States Army Europe and the 7th Army where she stayed until her retirement in 2001.

== After retirement ==
Hickerson was inducted into the Adjutant General's Corps Hall of Fame in 2013, and into the Army Women's Foundation Hall of Fame in 2018.

== Awards ==
- Army Distinguished Service Medal
- Defense Superior Service Medal with one bronze oak leaf cluster
- Legion of Merit with two bronze oak leaf clusters
- Meritorious Service Medal with four bronze oak leaf clusters
- Army Commendation Medal

== Personal life ==
Hickerson married Major Dennis Fogarty on December 18, 1974, and they currently reside in Florida.
