= List of Adjutants General of the United States Army =

Adjutant General of the United States Army
- Flag of the Adjutant General of the U.S. Army

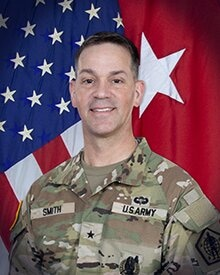
- Incumbent; Brigadier General Adam D. Smith since July 10, 2024
- United States Army Adjutant General's Corps
- Type: Chief administrative officer
- Member of: United States Army
- Reports to: Chief of Staff of the U.S. Army
- Formation: June 17, 1775
- First holder: Horatio Gates

This list of Adjutants General of the United States Army lists the chief administrative officer of the Army, from 1775 to present.

== List ==
Denotes an Acting Adjutant General of the United States Army

Image	Rank	Name	Begin date	End date	Notes
Horatio Gates	Major General	Horatio Gates	June 17, 1775	June 5, 1776	
Joseph Reed	Colonel	Joseph Reed	June 5, 1776	January 22, 1777	
Arthur St. Clair	Brigadier General	Arthur St. Clair	January 22, 1777	February 20, 1777	Acting Adjutant General
George Weedon	Brigadier General	George Weedon	February 20, 1777	April 19, 1777	Acting Adjutant General
	Colonel	Morgan Connor	April 19, 1777	June 18, 1777	
Timothy Pickering	Colonel	Timothy Pickering	June 18, 1777	January 5, 1778	
Alexander Scammel	Colonel	Alexander Scammel	January 5, 1778	January 1, 1781	
	Brigadier General	Edward Hand	January 8, 1781	November 3, 1783	
William North	Major	William North	November 5, 1783	October 28, 1787	
Ebenezer Denny	Lieutenant	Ebenezer Denny	October 28, 1787	November 7, 1790	Acting Adjutant General
John Pratt	Lieutenant	John Pratt	November 7, 1790	September 4, 1791	Acting Adjutant General
Winthrop Sargent	Lieutenant Colonel	Winthrop Sargent	September 4, 1791	November 4, 1791	Acting Adjutant General
Ebenezer Denny	Lieutenant	Ebenezer Denny	November 4, 1791	March 10, 1792	Acting Adjutant General
	Lieutenant	Henry De Butts	March 10, 1792	February 23, 1793	Acting Adjutant General
	Major	Michael Rudolph	February 23, 1793	July 17, 1793	Acting Adjutant General
	Captain	Edward Butler	July 18, 1793	May 13, 1794	Acting Adjutant General
	Major	John Mills	May 13, 1794	February 27, 1796	Acting Adjutant General
	Major	Jonathan Haskell	February 27, 1796	August 1, 1796	Acting Adjutant General
	Captain	Edward Butler	August 1, 1796	February 27, 1797	Acting Adjutant General
	Major	Thomas H. Cushing	February 27, 1797	July 19, 1798	Acting Adjutant General
William North	Lieutenant Colonel	William North	July 19, 1798	June 15, 1800	
	Lieutenant Colonel	Thomas H. Cushing	June 15, 1800	April 2, 1807	
	Major	Abimael Y. Nicoll	April 2, 1807	April 28, 1812	
Alexander Macomb	Lieutenant Colonel	Alexander Macomb	April 28, 1812	July 6, 1812	Acting Adjutant General
	Brigadier General	Thomas H. Cushing	July 6, 1812	March 12, 1813	
Zebulon Pike	Brigadier General	Zebulon Pike	March 12, 1813	April 27, 1813	
		vacant	April 27, 1813	May 19, 1814	
William H. Winder	Brigadier General	William H. Winder	May 19, 1814	July 2, 1814	
Daniel Parker	Brigadier General	Daniel Parker	November 22, 1814	June 1, 1821	
James Gadsden	Colonel	James Gadsden	August 13, 1821	March 22, 1822	
Charles J. Nourse	Captain	Charles J. Nourse	May 8, 1822	March 7, 1825	Acting Adjutant General
Roger Jones	Colonel	Roger Jones	March 7, 1825	July 15, 1852	
Samuel Cooper	Colonel	Samuel Cooper	July 15, 1852	March 7, 1861	
Lorenzo Thomas	Brigadier General	Lorenzo Thomas	March 7, 1861	February 22, 1869	
Edward D. Townsend	Brigadier General	Edward D. Townsend	February 22, 1869	June 15, 1880	
Richard C. Drum	Brigadier General	Richard C. Drum	June 15, 1880	May 28, 1889	
John C. Kelton	Brigadier General	John C. Kelton	June 7, 1889	June 24, 1892	
Robert Williams	Brigadier General	Robert Williams	July 5, 1892	November 5, 1893	
George D. Ruggles	Brigadier General	George D. Ruggles	November 6, 1893	September 11, 1897	
Samuel Breck	Brigadier General	Samuel Breck	September 11, 1897	February 25, 1898	
Henry C. Corbin	Major General	Henry C. Corbin	February 25, 1898	April 23, 1904	
Fred C. Ainsworth	Major General	Fred C. Ainsworth	April 23, 1904	February 16, 1912	
	Brigadier General	William P. Hall	February 17, 1912	June 11, 1912	
George Andrews	Brigadier General	George Andrews	August 5, 1912	August 27, 1914	
Henry P. McCain	Major General	Henry P. McCain	August 27, 1914	August 27, 1918	
Peter C. Harris	Major General	Peter C. Harris	September 1, 1918	August 31, 1922	
Robert C. Davis	Major General	Robert C. Davis	September 1, 1922	July 1, 1927	
	Major General	Lutz Wahl	July 2, 1927	December 30, 1928	
Charles H. Bridges	Major General	Charles H. Bridges	December 31, 1928	February 1, 1933	
James Fuller McKinley	Major General	James F. McKinley	February 2, 1933	October 31, 1935	
Edgar T. Conley	Major General	Edgar T. Conley	November 1, 1935	April 30, 1938	
	Major General	Emory S. Adams	May 1, 1938	February 28, 1942	
James A. Ulio	Major General	James A. Ulio	March 1, 1942	January 31, 1946	
Edward F. Witsell	Major General	Edward F. Witsell	February 1, 1946	June 30, 1951	
	Major General	William E. Bergin	July 1, 1951	May 31, 1954	
	Major General	John A. Klein	June 1, 1954	December 31, 1956	
	Major General	Herbert M. Jones	January 1, 1957	October 31, 1958	
	Major General	Robert V. Lee	November 1, 1958	September 30, 1961	
	Major General	Joe C. Lambert	October 1, 1961	July 31, 1966	
	Major General	Kenneth G. Wickham	1966	1971	
	Major General	Verne L. Bowers	1971	1975	
	Major General	Paul T. Smith	1975	1977	
	Major General	James C. Pennington	1977	1981	
Robert M. Joyce	Major General	Robert M. Joyce	1981	1984	
Donald J. Delandro	Brigadier General	Donald J. Delandro	1984	1985	
Mildred E. Hedberg	Brigadier General	Mildred E. Hedberg	1985	1986	
R. L. Dilworth	Brigadier General	Robert L. Dilworth	1986	1988	
Brigadier General William J. Meehan II	Brigadier General	William J. Meehan II	1988	1990	
Thomas F. Sikora	Brigadier General	Thomas F. Sikora	1990	1991	
Patricia P. Hickerson	Brigadier General	Patricia P. Hickerson	1991	1994	
Stephen R. Smith	Brigadier General	Stephen R. Smith	1994	1995	
Earl M. Simms	Brigadier General	Earl M. Simms	1995	1998	
Kathryn G. Frost	Brigadier General	Kathryn G. Frost	1998	2002	
Gina S. Farrisee	Brigadier General	Gina S. Farrisee	2002	2004	
E. Eric Porter	Brigadier General	Ernest E. Porter	2004	2006	
Reuben D. Jones	Brigadier General	Reuben D. Jones	2006	July 8, 2009	
Richard P. Mustion	Brigadier General	Richard P. Mustion	July 8, 2009	July 28, 2011	
Jason T. Evans	Brigadier General	Jason T. Evans	July 28, 2011	March 11, 2013	
David K. MacEwen	Brigadier General	David K. MacEwen	March 11, 2013	March 20, 2015	
James T. Iacocca	Brigadier General	James T. Iacocca	March 20, 2015	September 21, 2017	
Robert W. Bennett Jr.	Brigadier General	Robert W. Bennett Jr.	September 21, 2017	July 7, 2020	
Hope C. Rampy	Brigadier General	Hope C. Rampy	July 7, 2020	June 30, 2022	
Gregory S. Johnson	Brigadier General	Gregory S. Johnson	June 30, 2022	July 10, 2024	
Adam D. Smith	Brigadier General	Adam D. Smith	July 10, 2024	Incumbent	
