= Lutz Wahl =

United States Army general (1869–1928)

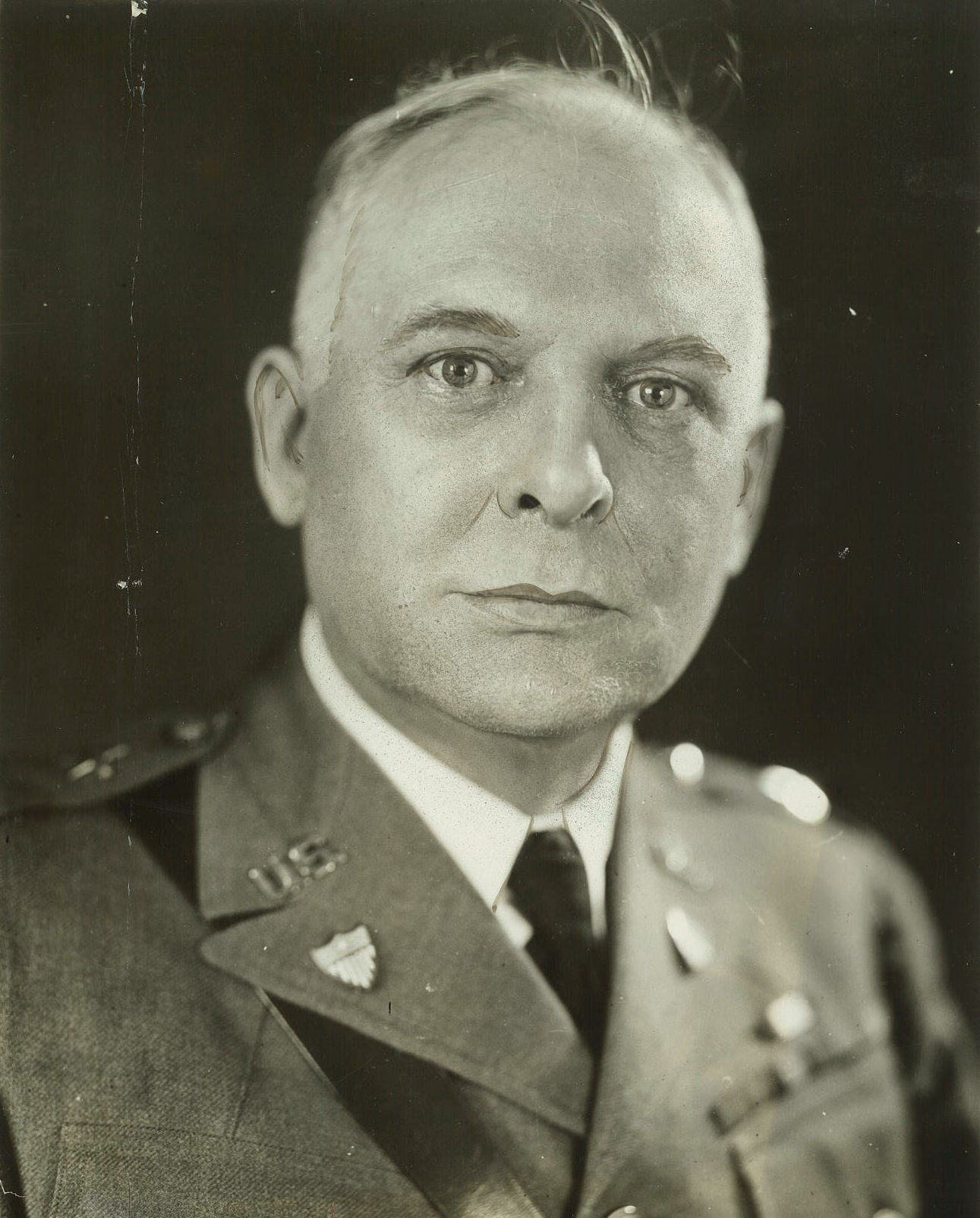
- 1927 photo by Underwood & Underwood
- Born: November 2, 1869; Milwaukee, Wisconsin
- Died: December 30, 1928 (aged 59); Washington, D.C.
- Burial place: Arlington National Cemetery
- Military career
- Allegiance: United States of America
- Branch: United States Army
- Service years: 1891–1928
- Rank: Major General
- Commands: 58th Infantry Regiment; 14th Infantry Brigade; 7th Infantry Division; Adjutant General of the U.S. Army
- Conflicts: Spanish–American War; Philippine–American War; Pancho Villa Expedition; World War I
- Awards: Army Distinguished Service Medal

Lutz Wahl (November 2, 1869 – December 30, 1928) was an American military officer who was a major general and Adjutant General of the United States Army from 1927 to 1928.

== Biography ==
Lutz Wahl was born in Milwaukee, Wisconsin, on November 2, 1869. He graduated 43rd in a class of 65 from the United States Military Academy in 1891. He served with the 5th Infantry in Louisiana and Georgia, and was then assigned as Professor of Military Science at Louisiana State University. During the Spanish–American War he served with the 21st Infantry, and was later assigned to mobilize and train volunteer units from Mississippi.

After an assignment with the 15th Infantry in Plattsburgh, New York, Wahl served in the Philippines from 1899 to 1901. Assigned there during the Philippine–American War, Wahl saw action at Guadeloupe Ridge and other battles. He performed recruiting duty in Colorado and Louisiana, and then served with the 21st Infantry in Montana.

He served again in the Philippines again beginning in 1906, Colorado in 1909, and the Philippines again in 1911. He was assigned to Fort Monroe, Virginia, and then Madison Barracks, New York. He graduated from the United States Army War College in 1916, and served at Eagle Pass, Texas, during and after the Pancho Villa Expedition.

Wahl was an instructor at the War College until the start of the American entry into World War I in April 1917, when he took command of the 58th Infantry Regiment, which he led during mobilization and training at Gettysburg, Pennsylvania, and Camp Greene, North Carolina. He then directed operations for the Army General Staff, after which he commanded the 14th Infantry Brigade, receiving promotion to temporary brigadier general. He led the brigade, part of the 7th Division, from training in Texas to embarkation at Camp Merritt, New Jersey, to combat on the Western Front, arriving in time for the final offensive before the armistice with Germany which caused hostilities to cease. He received the Army Distinguished Service Medal for his service in the war, with the medal's citation reading:

The President of the United States of America, authorized by Act of Congress, July 9, 1918, takes pleasure in presenting the Army Distinguished Service Medal to Brigadier General Lutz Wahl, United States Army, for exceptionally meritorious and distinguished services to the Government of the United States, in a duty of great responsibility during World War I. In Command of the 58th Infantry, 4th Division, from 6 August 1917 to 1 February 1918, General Wahl demonstrated leadership of a high order, untiring energy, and sound judgment. As Chief of the Operations Section, General Staff, War Department from 4 February 1918 to 12 May 1918, he displayed rare professional attainments, initiating and developing many valuable ideas in the organization of the Operations Section. As Brigadier General Commanding the 14th Infantry Brigade, 7th Division, from 19 May 1918 to 3 November 1919, he again displayed unusual gifts of organization, leadership, and tactical judgment, both during the period of organization and training of his Brigade, as well as in combat operations in France.

After the war Wahl remained in France on occupation duty. In September 1919 he took command of the 7th Division at Camp Funston. He then served on the board that appraised civilian claims against the army for property lost and damaged during the war, reverting to the permanent rank of colonel.

He graduated from a second course at the Army War College in 1921, after which he was assigned as assistant to the Adjutant General of the Army, receiving promotion to permanent brigadier general.

From 1927 until his death Wahl served as adjutant general, receiving promotion to major general and serving until his death.

Wahl died from pneumonia at his home in Washington, D.C. on December 30, 1928. He is buried in Arlington National Cemetery, Section W, Site 1628.

Wahl was married twice. His first wife was Emma Joubert (1871–1923) of New Orleans, with whom he had two children, Gretchen Marie and George Douglas. With his second wife, Fenella Hero Castanado (1891–1976), he had a daughter named Barbara and a stepdaughter named Fenella.

His son, George Douglas Wahl, was a career army officer who achieved the rank of brigadier general.

== See also ==
- List of Adjutant Generals of the U.S. Army

Military offices
| Preceded by Robert C. Davis | Adjutant General of the U. S. Army; July 2, 1927 – December 30, 1928 | Succeeded by Charles H. Bridges |
