= Donald J. Delandro =

United States Army brigadier general (1935–2021)

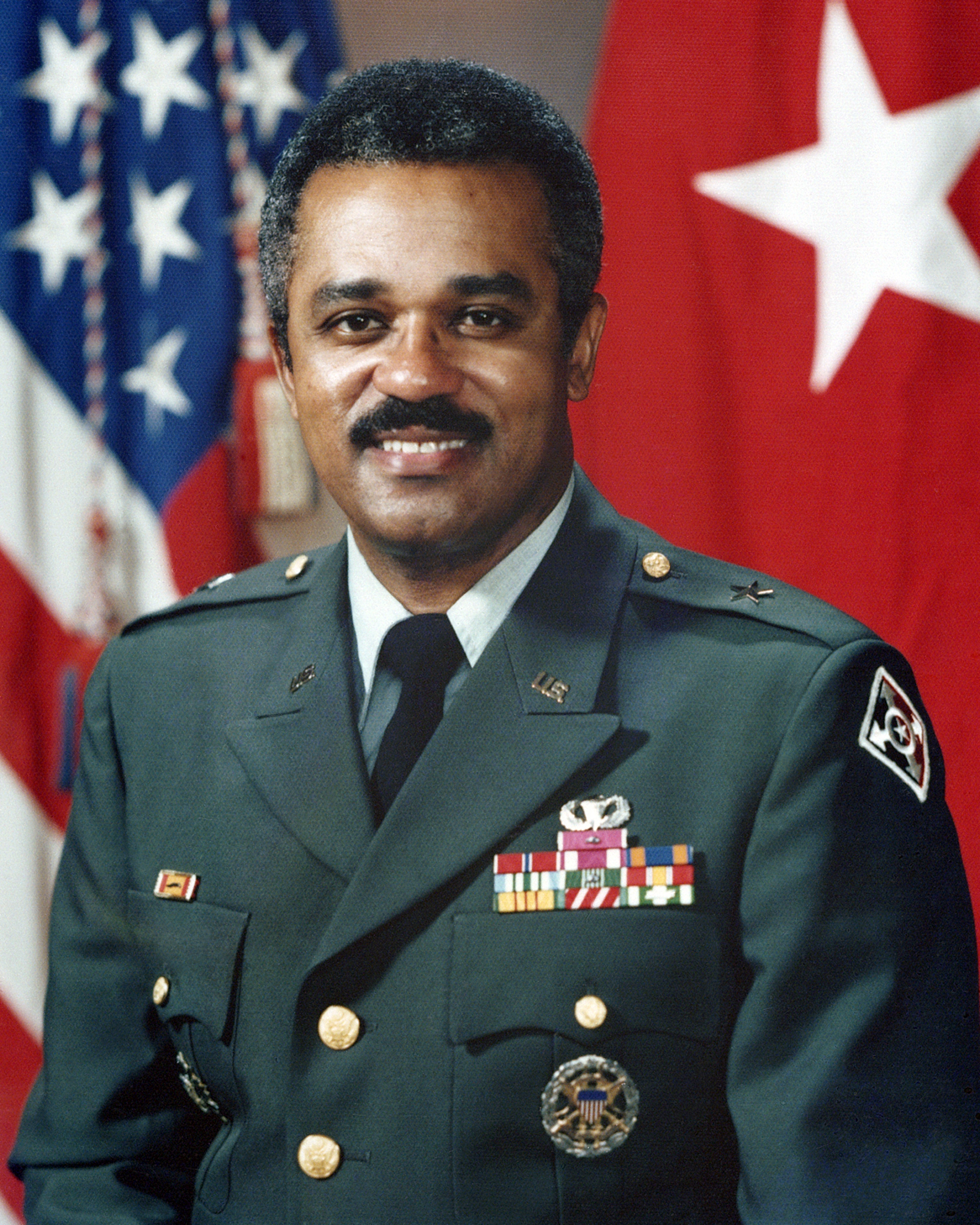
- Born: July 20, 1935; New Orleans, Louisiana, US
- Died: January 29, 2021 (aged 85) Alexandria, Virginia, US
- Allegiance: United States of America
- Branch: United States Army
- Service years: 1956–1985
- Rank: Brigadier General
- Commands: Adjutant General

Donald Joseph Delandro (July 20, 1935 – January 29, 2021) was an American military officer who was a brigadier general and Adjutant General of the United States Army from 1984 to 1985, the first African-American to serve in the position.

== Education ==
He was a 1956 graduate of Southern University and A&M College with a B.S. degree in business administration. Delandro later earned an M.B.A. degree from the University of Chicago.

== Personal life ==
Delandro was Catholic, a parishioner at St Joseph Catholic Church in Alexandria, Virginia.
