= SS Timothy Pickering =

World War II Liberty ship of the United States

History

United States
- Name: Timothy Pickering
- Namesake: Timothy Pickering
- Owner: War Shipping Administration
- Operator: American President Lines
- Builder: Permanente Metals Corp., Richmond No. 2 Yard, Richmond, California
- Laid down: 8 October 1941
- Launched: 28 March 1942
- Fate: Sunk by dive bomber, 1943. While anchored offshore at Avola, Sicily on 13 July 1943 with the loss of 127 British servicemen and a number of United States Merchant seamen. Only one British serviceman survived the explosion.

General characteristics
- Type: Liberty ship
- Tonnage: 7,000 long tons deadweight (DWT)
- Length: 441 ft 6 in (134.57 m)
- Beam: 56 ft 10.75 in (17.3419 m)
- Draft: 27 ft 9.25 in (8.4646 m)
- Propulsion: 2 × oil-fired boilers; Triple expansion steam engine, 2,500 hp (1,864 kW); single screw
- Speed: 11.5 knots (21.3 km/h; 13.2 mph)
- Capacity: 9,140 tons cargo
- Complement: 41
- Armament: 1 × 4 in (100 mm) deck gun; Variety of anti-aircraft guns

SS Timothy Pickering (Hull Number 246) was a Liberty ship built in the United States during World War II. She was named after Timothy Pickering, the third United States Secretary of State under George Washington and John Adams.

The ship was laid down on 8 October 1941, then launched on 28 March 1942. She was lost after she was hit by an Italian Ju 87 Stuka off Augusta, Sicily on 13 July 1943. Timothy Pickering was operated by American President Lines under charter with the Maritime Commission and War Shipping Administration.

== Awards ==
George W. Alther Jr. was second mate on SS Timothy Pickering. He was given the Merchant Marine Distinguished Service Medal by The President of the United States. It was given for heroism above and beyond the call of duty. SS Timothy Pickering was hit with a 500-pound bomb in 1942 and sank. During the air attack on in the Sicilian port of Avola was loaded with ammunition, T.N.T., aviation gasoline, and British troops. The bomb broke the ship in two. Much of the ammunition exploded and burning gasoline floated around the ship. George W. Alther Jr. saved the life of the wounded gunnery officer as he was on a flame-filled lower deck, with disregard for his own safety. For the President the award was given by Admiral Emory S. Land.
