= George Weedon (general) =

American soldier during the American Revolutionary War (1734–1793)

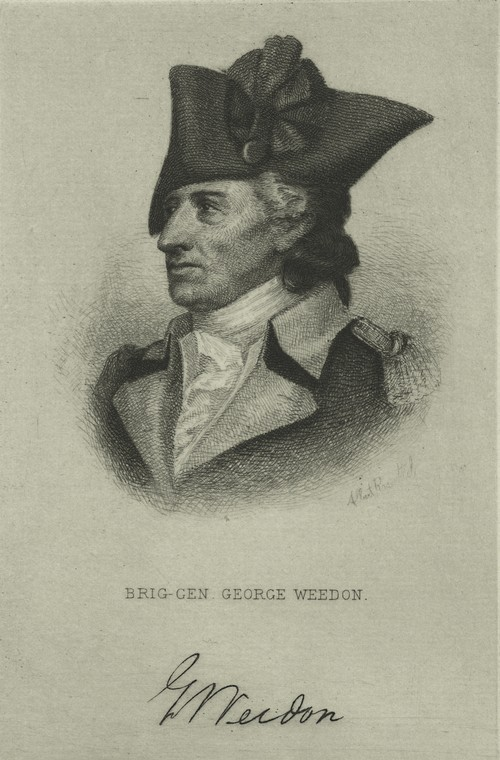
George Weedon Continental Army General

George Weedon (1734–1793) was an American military officer from Fredericksburg, Colony of Virginia, who served during the Revolutionary War. He held the rank of brigadier general in the Continental Army and later in the Virginia militia. After the Revolutionary War ended, he became an original member of the Society of the Cincinnati (Va.).

== Biography ==
Weedon served as a lieutenant under George Washington in the French and Indian War, primarily assigned to garrison duty in western Virginia. After the war, he moved to Fredericksburg and opened a tavern. It was within Weedon's tavern that Thomas Jefferson wrote the Statute of Religious Freedom, in January 1777, the first document of its kind to acknowledge government recognition of religious tolerance. In 1775, he was made a lieutenant colonel and second in command to Hugh Mercer, tasked with creating the 3rd Virginia Regiment, Virginia Line, Continental Army. He was promoted to colonel in 1776 and succeeded Mercer in command of his regiment. Following Mercer's death at Princeton, Weedon was promoted to brigadier general in 1777 and again succeeded him. He fought in the Battles of Trenton, Brandywine, and Germantown. At Valley Forge, Weedon commanded a brigade in Nathanael Greene's division. His brigade included Stewart's 13th Pennsylvania Regiment along with the 2nd, 6th, 10th, and 14th Virginia regiments.

In 1778, he resigned after a dispute with the Congress over seniority. He went home to Virginia to lead a brigade of the state's militia at the request of Governor Thomas Jefferson. He led his militia unit in the Yorktown campaign, in which his brigade successfully repelled the feared and infamous unit of Colonel Banastre Tarleton, thus closing the one means of British escape.

Some of his many descendants who are alive today include Paul Ashford Weadon, III, Christopher Weadon, Jared Weadon, Lisa Fell, Zoey Fell, Henry Fell, Blair Fell, Darcy Weadon, Ethan Weadon, and Grant Weadon. George’s last name has evolved over the centuries.

Military offices
Preceded by Arthur St. Clair (acting)	Adjutant Generals of the U. S. Army; February 20, 1777-April 19, 1777 (acting)	Succeeded by Morgan Connor
