= Edward Fuller Witsell =

United States Army general

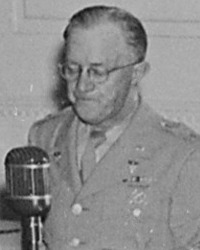
- Major General Witsell in 1945
- Born: March 29, 1891
- Died: November 27, 1969 (aged 78)
- Burial place: Arlington National Cemetery
- Military career
- Allegiance: United States
- Branch: United States Army
- Rank: Major General
- Commands: Adjutant General of the U.S. Army
- Conflicts: World War I World War II

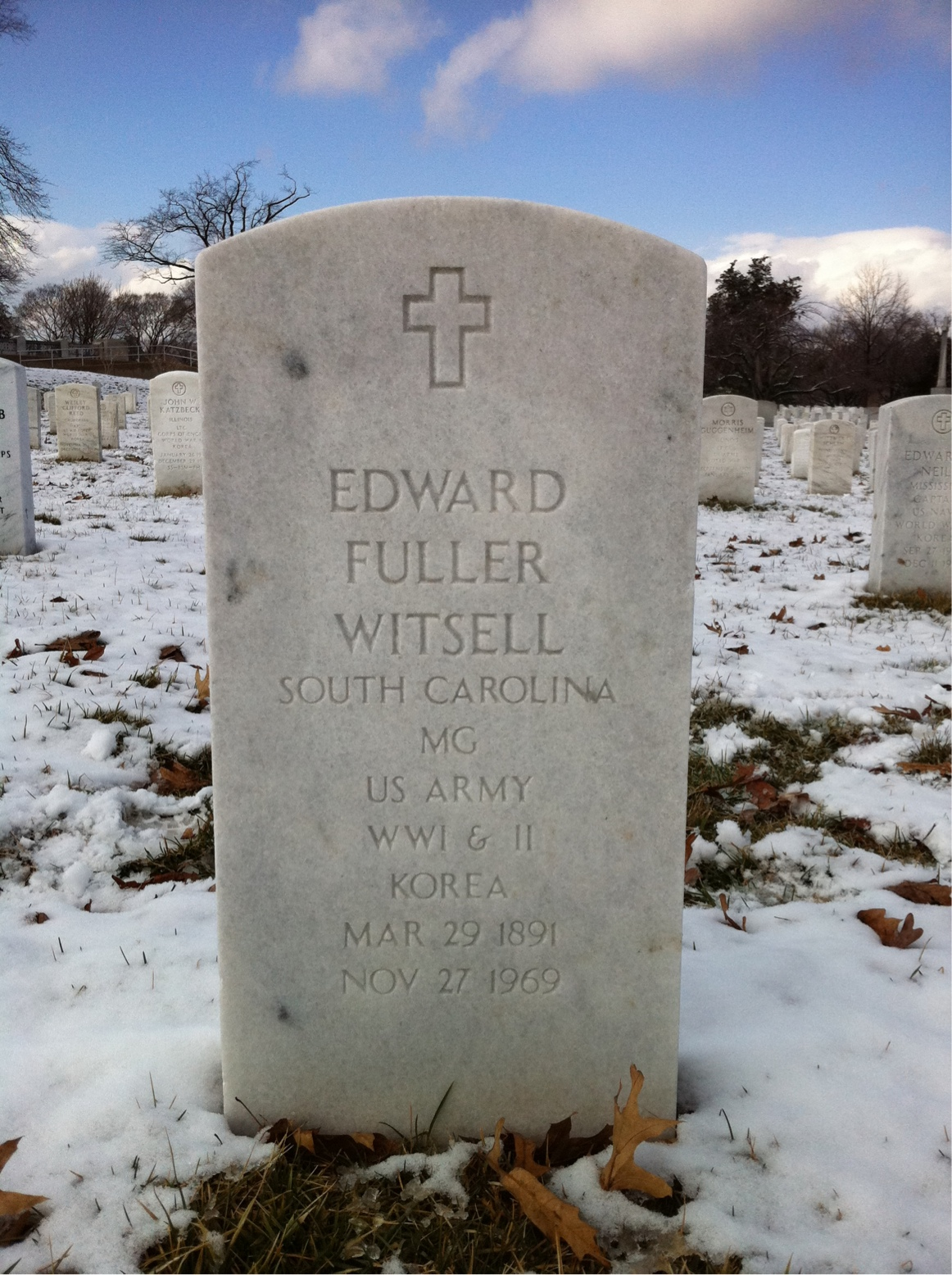
Grave at Arlington National Cemetery

Edward Fuller Witsell (March 29, 1891–November 27, 1969) was an American military officer who served as Adjutant General in the United States Army from 1946 to 1951. Witsell was a 1911 graduate of The Citadel, The Military College of South Carolina and a World War I veteran.

He was a recipient of the Army Distinguished Service Medal.

== See also ==
- List of Adjutant Generals of the U.S. Army

== Sources ==
- Ancell, R. Manning; Miller, Christine Marie, eds. (1996). The Biographical Dictionary of World War II Generals and Flag Officers. Westport, Connecticut: Greenwood Press. p. 351.

Military offices
Preceded by James A. Ulio	Adjutant General of the U. S. Army; February 1, 1946-June 30, 1951	Succeeded by William E. Bergin
