= Morgan Connor =

- Born: County Kerry, Ireland
- Disappeared: January 1780
- Military career
- Allegiance: United States
- Branch: Continental Army
- Service years: 1775–1780
- Rank: Lieutenant Colonel
- Commands: Adjutant General of the U.S. Army
- Conflicts: American Revolutionary War; Battle of Brandywine; Battle of Paoli; Battle of Germantown; Battle of White Marsh; Battle of Monmouth; Battle of Stony Point

Morgan Connor (fl. 1775 - disappeared January 1780) was an Irish-born American military officer in the Continental Army who served as Adjutant General in 1777.

== See also ==
- List of Adjutant Generals of the U.S. Army
- List of people who disappeared mysteriously at sea

Military offices
Preceded by George Weedon (acting)	Adjutant General of the U. S. Army; April 19, 1777-June 18, 1777	Succeeded by Timothy Pickering
