= Robert Courtney Davis =

United States Army general (1876–1944)

Robert C. Davis
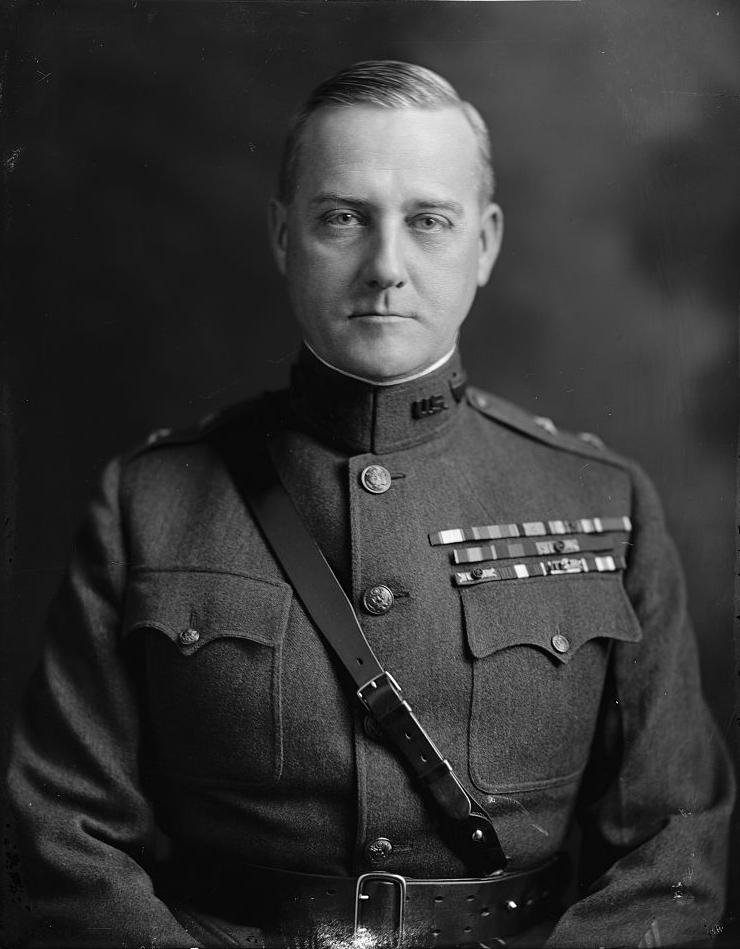
- Robert C. Davis as major general after 1922
- Born: October 12, 1876; Lancaster, Pennsylvania, US
- Died: September 2, 1944 (aged 67); Elmsford, New York, US
- Burial place: Arlington National Cemetery
- Military career
- Allegiance: United States of America
- Branch: United States Army
- Service years: 1898–1927
- Rank: Major General
- Commands: Adjutant General of the U.S. Army
- Conflicts: Spanish–American War; Philippine–American War; World War I
- Awards: Distinguished Service Medal; Silver Star (2)

Robert Courtney Davis (October 12, 1876 – September 2, 1944) was an American military officer who was Adjutant General of the United States Army from 1922 to 1927.

== Early life ==
Robert C. Davis was born in Lancaster, Pennsylvania on October 12, 1876. He attended Franklin & Marshall College before being appointed to the United States Military Academy in 1894. Davis graduated in 1898 and was commissioned as a Second Lieutenant in the 17th Infantry Regiment.

== Spanish–American War ==
Davis took part in the Spanish–American War, and saw action in Cuba. He was involved in the Santiago campaign and took part in the battles of El Caney and San Juan. He received the Silver Star for heroism at El Caney, and was recommended for a brevet promotion to First Lieutenant.

Davis subsequently served in the Philippine–American War. In August 1899, he received a second Silver Star and promotion to brevet Captain for heroism while fighting Filipino insurgents. He remained in the Philippines until 1904, when he was assigned to West Point as a professor in the Department of Tactics.

== Post–Spanish–American War ==
In 1906, Davis returned to Cuba with the 17th Infantry. In 1909 he was assigned as aide-de-camp to Thomas Henry Barry. When Barry was appointed as West Point's Superintendent in 1911, Davis was assigned as the adjutant on Barry's staff.

Davis served again with the 17th Infantry, and then served again in the Philippines as a member of the 8th Infantry Regiment. For most of 1915, Davis was detailed as Inspector of the Philippine Scouts, and received promotion to Major.

== World War I ==
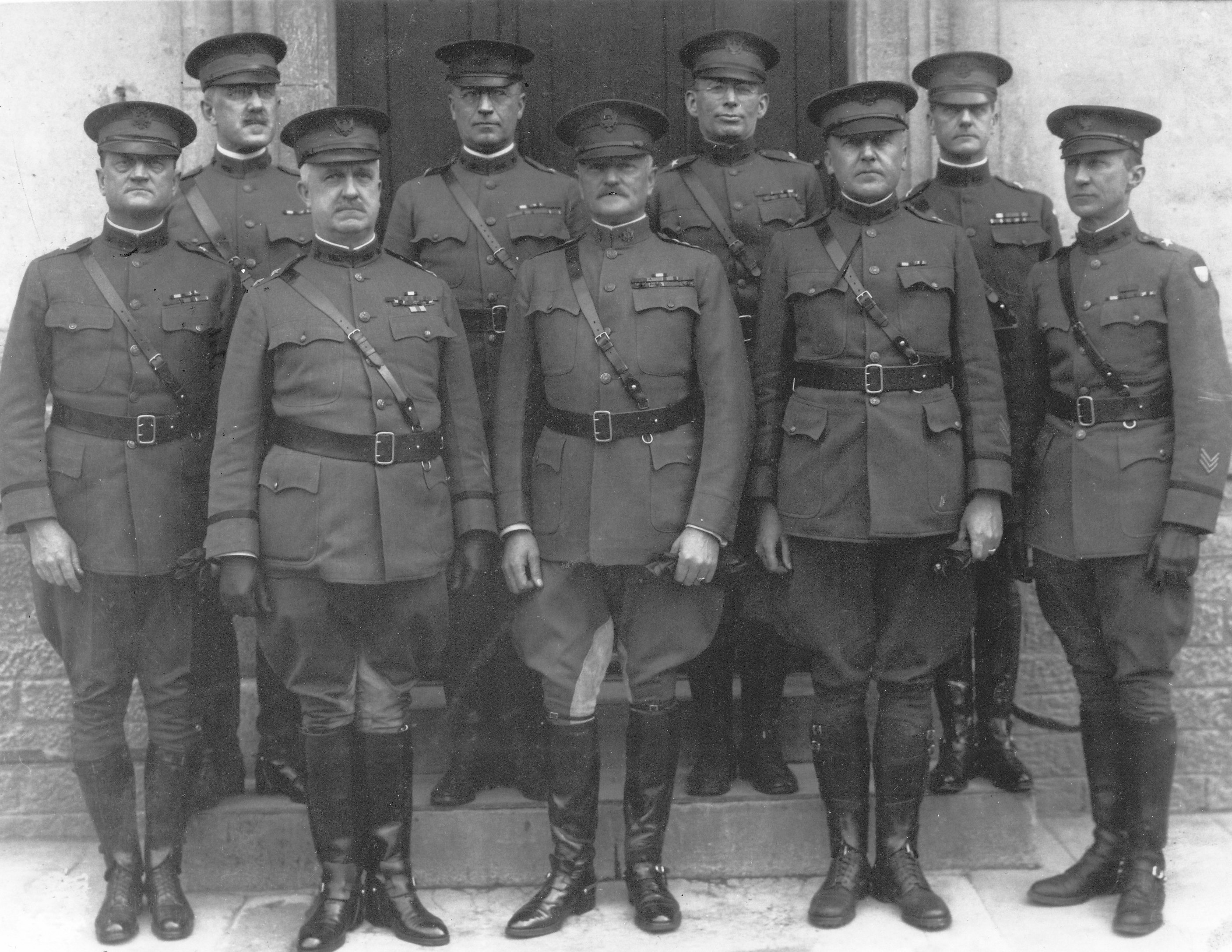
General John J. Pershing and members of his General Headquarters (GHQ) staff, France, 1918. Stood in the back row on the far right is Brigadier General Robert C. Davis.

At the start of World War I Davis was assigned to the staff of the army's Adjutant General. In mid-1917 he went to France as Assistant to the Adjutant General of the American Expeditionary Forces. He later served as acting adjutant general and then adjutant general of the A.E.F., receiving a temporary promotion to brigadier general.

== Post-World War I ==
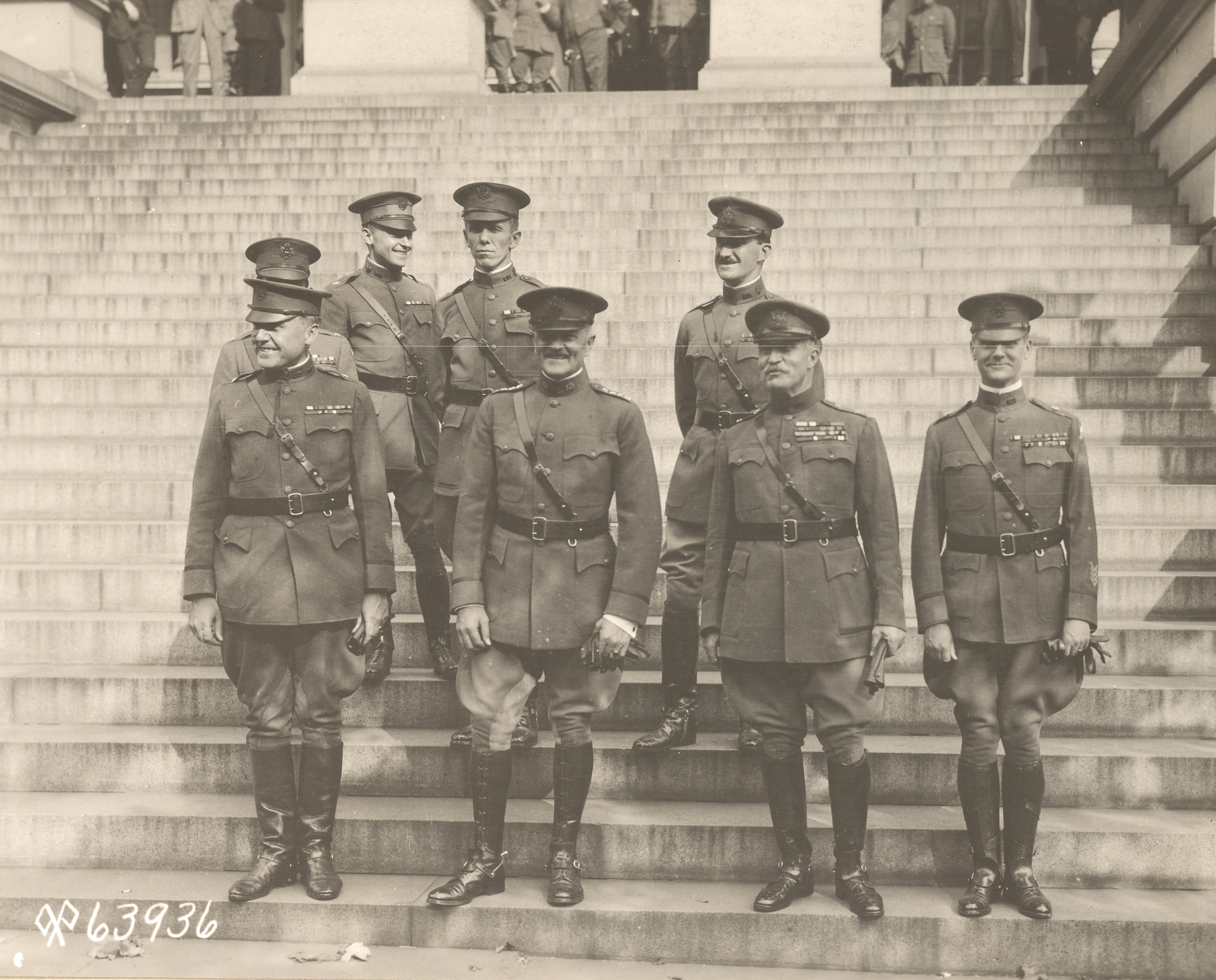
General of the Armies John J. Pershing and members of his staff standing outside the State, War, and Navy Building in Washington, D.C., September 23, 1919. Stood two from Pershing in the front row is Brigadier General Robert C. Davis.

Following World War I Davis was assigned to the staff of the Army's Adjutant General, and participated on a board which reviewed War Department staff activities and made recommendations for personnel reorganization and improvements to processes and procedures.

From 1922 to 1927, Davis served as Adjutant General of the Army, receiving promotion to major general. His most notable accomplishment in this position was the organization and execution of a plan to pay bonuses to veterans of World War I.

== Post-military career ==
After retiring from the Army, Davis was President of Photomaton, Inc., a company which produced automatic camera photo booths. He was also executive director of the New York Chapter of the American Red Cross, and served as President of the West Point Association of Graduates.

== Death and burial ==
Davis died in Elmsford, New York on September 2, 1944 after suffering a heart attack while golfing at the Knollwood Country Club. He and his wife Ruby Hale are buried at Arlington National Cemetery.

== Awards ==
In addition to his two Silver Stars, Davis received the Army Distinguished Service Medal for his World War I service. The medal's citation states the following:

The President of the United States of America, authorized by Act of Congress, July 9, 1918, takes pleasure in presenting the Army Distinguished Service Medal to Brigadier General Robert Courtney Davis, United States Army, for exceptionally meritorious and distinguished services to the Government of the United States, in a duty of great responsibility during World War I. As Adjutant General of the American Expeditionary Forces, General Davis had performed his exacting duties with high professional skill and administrative ability. The exceptional efficiency of the Adjutant General's Department under his direction was a material factor in the success of the Staff work at General Headquarters.

He also received numerous foreign awards, including: the Legion of Honor (Commander) (France); Order of the Bath (Companion) (Great Britain); Order of the Crown (Commander) (Belgium); Order of the Crown (Commander) (Italy); Order of Prince Danilo I (Grand Cross) (Montenegro); and Medal of La Solidaridad (Second Class) (Panama).

In 1941, Davis was conferred an honorary doctor of science degree by Washington & Jefferson College.

== Family ==
In 1902, Davis married Ruby Caroline Hale (1879–1959). They had no children.

== See also ==
- List of Adjutant Generals of the U.S. Army

== Bibliography ==
- Davis, Henry Blaine Jr. (1998). Generals in Khaki. Raleigh, North Carolina: Pentland Press. ISBN 1571970886. OCLC 40298151.

Military offices
Preceded by Peter C. Harris	Adjutant General of the U. S. Army; September 1, 1922 – July 1, 1927	Succeeded by Lutz Wahl
