= Surgeon's mate =

Assistant to the person responsible for the health of a ship's passengers and crew

A surgeon's mate was a rank in the Royal Navy for a medically trained assistant to the ship's surgeon. The rank was renamed assistant surgeon in 1805, and was considered equivalent to the rank of master's mate/mate. In 1807, first-rate would have three, a third-rate two, and frigates and sloops one.

A surgeon's mate was responsible for visiting patients in the sick bay and attending to their needs. Along with the surgeon, he would examine patients during morning sick call. He would make daily rounds of men already in the sick bay, while the loblolly boy would feed, wash and shave bedridden patients. The mate would prepare and administer medicines in the sick-bay, dress wounds and skin ulcers, and bleeding men who needed it. He was responsible for maintaining the ship's surgical instruments, for keeping accurate records of medicines and expenditures, for inspecting the cook's pots and pans, and for supervising the loblolly boy.

Surgeon mates had a similar shipboard status to midshipmen and master's mates, and were berthed with them in the gunroom. However, they were comparatively very well paid, earning £9 2s per month in 1815, equivalent to a lieutenant on a flagship and three times as much as a master's mate.

A navy's surgeon's mate or early navy assistant surgeon has not to be confused with a modern assistant surgeon in the Medical Staff Corps (see Royal Army Medical Corps) or a passed assistant surgeon in the United States Army Medical Corps. An assistant surgeon (MSC) or passed assistant surgeon (USAMC) possessed a full medical license (and ranked as commissioned officer), a surgeon's mate did not.

== Bibliography ==
- King, Dean (2001). A Sea of Words: Lexicon and Companion for Patrick O'Brian's Seafaring Tales. Henry Holt. ISBN 0-8050-6615-2.
- Lavery, Brian (1989). Nelson's Navy: The Ships, Men and Organization. Annapolis, Md: Naval Institute Press. ISBN 0-87021-258-3. "Nelson's Navy Lavery."
- Lewis, Michael (1960). A Social History of the Navy. London: Ruskin House.
