= Verne L. Bowers =

United States Army major general (1919–2020)

- Born: December 23, 1919; Webb, Iowa, US
- Died: March 12, 2020 (aged 100) Ohio, US
- Allegiance: United States of America
- Branch: United States Army
- Service years: 1941–1975
- Rank: Major general
- Commands: Adjutant General

Verne Lyle Bowers (December 23, 1919 – March 12, 2020) was a United States Army major general who served as Adjutant General of the United States Army from 1971 to 1975.

Bowers joined the Army and served in World War II. He was for a time stationed in Panama which is where he met Arlene who he would later marry. He served in the Korean and Vietnam Wars as well. He earned a degree from Harvard Business School.
