= Gadsden =

Gadsden is a surname. It may refer to:

== People ==
=== Politics ===
- Christopher Gadsden (1724–1805), American soldier and statesman, designer of the Gadsden flag
- James Gadsden (1788–1858), American statesman and namesake of the Gadsden Purchase, grandson of Christopher
- James I. Gadsden (born 1948), American diplomat and former U.S. Ambassador to Iceland
- John Gadsden (1787–1831), American politician in South Carolina, grandson of Christopher
- Peter Gadsden (1929–2006), British chartered engineer and Lord Mayor of London

=== Religion ===
- Alphonza Gadsden (1945–2025), American Anglican bishop
- Christopher Edwards Gadsden (1785–1852), American Episcopal Bishop of South Carolina, grandson of Christopher

=== Sports ===
- Bert Gadsden (1893–1973), English footballer
- Ernie Gadsden (1895–1966), English footballer
- Neville Gadsden (1919–1984), Australian athlete and 1956 Olympian
- Oronde Gadsden (born 1971), American football player
- Oronde Gadsden II (born 2003), American football player
- William Gadsden (1910–1995), South African cricketer

=== Other ===
- Henry W. Gadsden (1911–1980), American business executive
- Jacqueline Gadsden (1900–1986), American film actress
- Martha Lou Gadsden (1930–2021), American chef and restaurateur
- Rachel Gadsden, UK-based visual artist and performance artist
- Vivian Gadsden, American psychologist

== Places in the United States ==
- Gadsden, Alabama, a city in Etowah County and the largest city of the name Gadsden.
- Gadsden, Arizona, a colonia in Yuma County
- Gadsden County, Florida
- Gadsden, Indiana, an unincorporated community in Boone County
- Gadsden, South Carolina, a census designated place in Richland County
- Gadsden, Tennessee, a town in Crockett County

== Other uses ==
=== Buildings ===
- Gadsden Coca-Cola Bottling Plant, a historic building in Gadsden, Alabama
- Gadsden Correctional Facility, a prison in Quincy, Florida
- Gadsden Green Homes, a housing complex in Charleston, South Carolina
- Gadsden Hotel, a historic hotel in Douglas, Arizona
- Gadsden Mall, in Gadsden, Alabama

=== Military ===
- Battery Gadsden, a historic artillery battery located in Charleston County, South Carolina
- Gadsden Depot, a United States Army depot in Gadsden, Alabama
- Operation Gadsden, a United States Army operation in Vietnam in February 1967
- USS Gadsden, a former cargo ship of the United States Navy

=== Sports ===
- Gadsden Eagles, a defunct Minor League Baseball team based in Gadsden, Alabama
- Gadsden Pilots, a defunct Minor League Baseball team based in Gadsden, Alabama
- Gadsden Steel Makers, a defunct Minor League Baseball team based in Gadsden, Alabama

=== Other ===
- 13551 Gadsden, a minor planet
- Gadsden Confederate Memorial, formerly located in Quincy, Florida
- Gadsden Creek, on the Charleston peninsula, South Carolina
- Gadsden flag, a historical American flag dating to 1775
- Gadsden High School (disambiguation), in several places
- Gadsden Purchase, land acquired by the United States from Mexico in 1854
- The Gadsden Times, a daily newspaper serving Gadsden, Alabama
- Gadsden Trolley System, a provider of mass transportation in Gadsden, Alabama
