= General Jones =

General Jones may refer to:

== United Kingdom ==
- Sir Charles Phibbs Jones (1906–1988), British Army general lieutenant general
- Daniel Jones (British Army officer) (1793) was a British Army
- Sir Edward Jones (British Army officer, born 1936) (1936–2007), British Army general
- Sir George Jones (Royal Marines officer) ( –1857), British Marine Corps general
- Sir Harry Jones (British Army officer) (1791–1866), British Army general
- Henry Richmond Jones (1808–1880), British Army general
- Sir Howard Sutton Jones (1835–1912), British Marine Corps general
- Inigo Jones (British Army officer) (1848–1914), British Army major general
- Ivan Jones (British Army officer) (born 1966), British Army lieutenant general
- Sir John Thomas Jones (1783–1843), British Army major general
- Leslie Cockburn Jones, British Army major general
- Lumley Jones (1887–1918), British Army brigadier general
- Richard Jones (East India Company officer) (1754–1835), British East India Company lieutenant general
- Rupert Jones (British Army officer) (born 1969), British Army major general
- Seymour Willoughby Anketell-Jones (1898-1972), British Army brigadier general
- Sir William Jones (British Army officer) (1808-1890), British Army general

== United States ==
=== U.S. Army ===
- Alan W. Jones (1894–1969), U.S. Army major general
- Albert M. Jones (1890–1967), U.S. Army major general
- Anthony R. Jones (born 1948), U.S. Army lieutenant general
- George M. Jones (1911–1996), U.S. Army brigadier general
- Herbert M. Jones, U.S. Army major general
- James I. Jones (1786–1858), U.S. Army major general
- Lloyd E. Jones (1889–1958), U.S. Army major general
- Patrick Henry Jones (1830–1900), Union Army brigadier general
- Reuben D. Jones (fl. 1980s–2010s), U.S. Army major general
- Roger Jones (Adjutant General) (1789–1852), U.S. Army brevet major general
- Roger Jones (Inspector General) (1831–1889), Union Army brigadier general

=== U.S. Air Force ===
- David C. Jones (1921–2013), U.S. Air Force General
- David M. Jones (1913–2008), U.S. Air Force major general
- Harley Sanford Jones (1902–1997), U.S. Air Force brigadier general
- Hiram "Doc" Jones, U.S. Air Force brigadier general
- James G. Jones (general) (1934– ), U.S. Air Force major general
- Junius Wallace Jones (1890–1977), U.S. Air Force major general

=== U.S. Marine Corps ===
- James L. Jones (1943– ), U.S. Marine Corps General
- Louis R. Jones (1895-1973), U.S. Marine Corps major general
- William K. Jones (1916–1998), U.S. Marine Corps lieutenant general

=== Confederate States Army ===
- David Rumph Jones (1825–1863), Confederate States Army major general
- John M. Jones (1820–1864), Confederate States Army brigadier general
- John R. Jones (1827–1901), Confederate States Army brigadier general
- Samuel Jones (Confederate Army officer) (1819–1887), Confederate States Army major general
- William E. Jones (general) (1824–1864), Confederate States Army brigadier general

=== Others ===
- Allen Jones (Continental Congress) (1739–1798), North Carolina Militia brigadier general in the American Revolutionary War
- Penn Jones Jr. (1914–1998), Texas National Guard brevet brigadier general
- Rhys Jones (soldier) (1969– ), New Zealand Army lieutenant general
- Rosalie Gardiner Jones (1883-1978), American suffragist known as "General Jones"

== See also ==
- Stanhope Bayne-Jones (1888–1970), U.S. Army brigadier general
- Percy George Calvert-Jones (1894–1977), British Army major general
- Arnold Elzey (Jones) (1816–1871), Confederate States Army major general
- DeLancey Floyd-Jones (1826–1902), U.S. Army brigadier general
- Sir Love Jones-Parry (British Army officer) (1781–1853), British Army lieutenant general
- David Rutherford-Jones (1958– ), British Army major general
- Sir Guy Salisbury-Jones (1896–1985), British Army major general
- Llewelyn Wansbrough-Jones (1900–1974), British Army major general
- Jones (surname)
- Attorney General Jones (disambiguation)
