= Gadsdon =

Gadsdon is a surname. Notable people with the surname include:

- Beau Gadsdon (born 2008), British actress
- Joan Gadsdon (1923–2003), Australian ballet dancer, actor and artist
- Luke Gadsdon (born 1997), Canadian rower
- Shane Gadsdon (born 1991), New Zealand cricketer

== See also ==
- Gadsden (disambiguation)
