= Beneventum =

Beneventum (Latin for 'good wind') may refer to:

- Benevento, city in southern Italy
  - Duchy of Benevento
- Beneventum (Africa), former city and diocese in Roman Africa, now a Latin Catholic titular bishopric
- Beneventum Plantation House in South Carolina
