= Flags of Valor =

United States Flag Business

Flags of Valor is an American small business that is veteran-owned and veteran-operated. Started in 2015 by Joe Shamess and Brian Steorts and located in Virginia, the business is notable for building wooden flags. The flags are crafted using 'American-sourced tools, supplies and material.’

== History ==
Brian Steorts and Joe Shamess met as United States Air Force pilots at Hurlburt Field. Both of them have served numerous combat deployments to regions including Afghanistan, Iraq and the Pacific Islands. Due to a service-related spinal injury during his ninth deployment in Afghanistan, Brian Steorts, an Army (82nd Airborne) and Air Force Special Operations Command veteran, found himself in rehab no longer wearing his patches. Missing the uniform, he tried to find himself a flag, but couldn't find the flag he was looking for, one that was truly Made in America. So after a recommendation by Joe, Steorts decided to make one for himself, a completely veteran made flag of the United States. He found the woodworking therapeutic during the physical therapy. The first few flags he made were given to the families of fallen explosive ordnance disposal soldiers, and from there the business idea grew.

Flags of Valour was opened in December 2015 as a veteran-owned and veteran-run small business in Ashburn, Virginia with the aim "to bring meaningful employment to combat veterans". By April 2020 Flags of Valor has hired a total of 65 veterans since opening. These combat veterans come from backgrounds such as the Korean War and the Iraq war. Most of the veterans are service and combat disabled.

Each plank for the flags is hand-selected, cut, stained, painted, antiqued and finally protected with polyurethane. They are designed and crafted with an artistic rustic look. Each flag is tagged by the veteran who crafted it and named after military related historical events or people, such as the Gadsden Flag created and named after Christopher Gadsden. Depending on the flag, the cost varies between $55 and $500. By the end of 2018 Flags of Valor had sold more than 25,000 flags. The manufacturing facility is in Winchester. The flags are crafted using 'American-sourced tools, supplies and material’.
