= Attorney General Jones =

Attorney General Jones may refer to:

- Buell F. Jones (1892–1947), Attorney General of South Dakota
- Edward Warburton Jones (1912–1993), Attorney General for Northern Ireland
- Elwyn Jones, Baron Elwyn-Jones (1909–1989), Attorney General for England and Wales
- Isaac Dashiell Jones (1806–1893), Attorney General of Maryland
- Jim Jones (judge) (born 1942), Attorney General of Idaho
- Lawrence C. Jones (1893–1972), Attorney General of Vermont
- Ross F. Jones (1900–1979), Attorney General of Arizona
- W. Claude Jones (died 1884), Attorney General of Hawaii
- William Jones (law officer) (1631–1682), Attorney General for England and Wales
- Wiley E. Jones (1856–1924), Attorney General of Arizona
- William Carey Jones (1855–1927), Attorney General of Washington

== See also ==
- General Jones (disambiguation)
