= St. Stephen's Episcopal Church (Charleston, South Carolina) =

Coordinates: 32.784956°N 79.931128°W

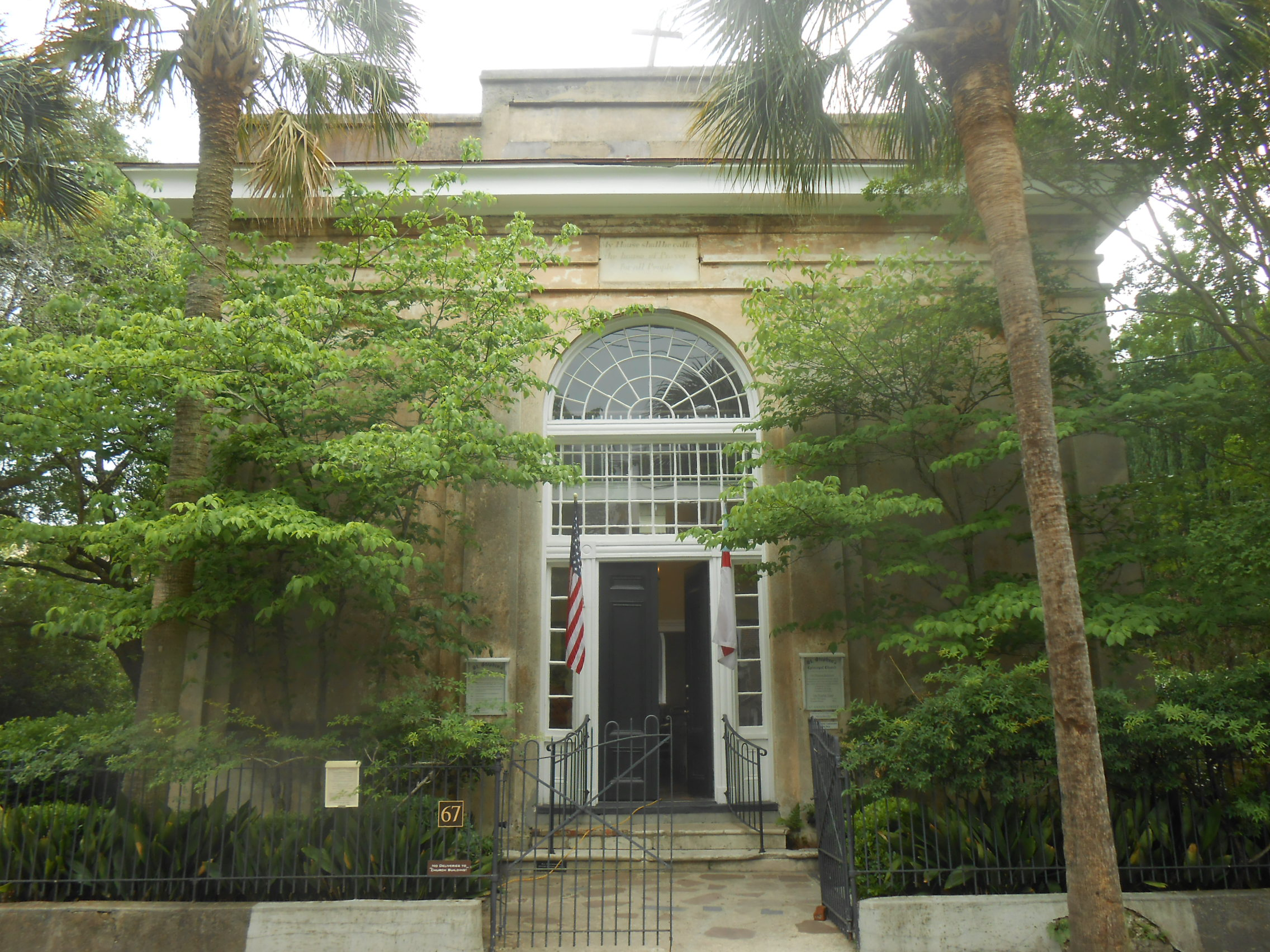
St. Stephen's is at 67 Anson Street in Charleston, South Carolina.

St. Stephen's Episcopal Church is an Episcopal parish in Charleston, South Carolina, founded in 1822. It was the first Episcopal church in the United States at which pews were offered to attendants at no cost; other Episcopal churches either sold or leased pews to members to fund the churches. The church was named as a contributing property to the Charleston Historic District when it was expanded in 1970.

== History ==
The congregation first met in a rented room. The construction of the first church was funded by donations and was intended to be a free church "for the general benefit of those who may not have it in their power to provide themselves with seats in other Churches." The cornerstone of the first St. Stephen's was laid on September 30, 1823, on Guignard Street near Maiden Lane. (Guignard Street ran all the way from East Bay Street to Meeting Street, and Maiden Lane extended a block further to the south than it does today.) The Right Rev. Nathaniel Bowen presided at the ceremony for the laying of the cornerstone of what would be a brick building of 36' by 50'.

An open letter ran in 1834 about the inadequate size of the chapel on Guignard Street.

On June 5, 1835, a fire destroyed several city blocks bounded by Market Street (to the south), Meeting Street (west), Hasell Street (north), and Maiden Lane and Anson Street (east). The church was purposefully destroyed to create a firebreak during the fire.

The decision was made to relocate the church to the site of the cemetery on Anson Street in Ansonborough, and the cornerstone for the current church was laid on December 26, 1835, on Anson Street It was designed in the Greek Revival style by Henry and Edward Horlbeck, and completed and consecrated in 1836.

In 1845, under Rev. Thomas Dupont, the church opened a parochial school, but it was closed in 1956 after the public school system opened. Rev. Dupont later opened a small orphanage, which eventually grew into the Episcopal Home for Children in York, and a home for women, which evolved into what is now Bishop Gadsden Retirement Community.

The church closed temporarily on 17 January 1864, after suffering damage from shelling during the American Civil War, but repairs were soon made. It continued to grow, and became a self-supporting parish in 1866. In 1880, however, the church was closed again, and most of the congregation joined what was then St. Luke's, and later attempts to re-open the church proved abortive.

In 1911, a mission with a parochial school opened at St. Stephen's. In 1923, an African-American Methodist congregation under Rev. William M. Morgan converted to Episcopalianism, and were given St. Stephen's to use as a place of worship. This began a long period when St. Stephen's largely served the black, working-class people of Ansonborough. As demographics shifted, the church renewed efforts at integration in 1987. Rev. Alanson Houghton was brought out of retirement to lead the parish through its reintegration period, serving until 1993.

The church suffered damage during Hurricane Hugo in 1989, and temporarily held services in its new parish hall while repairs were made. In 2001, the congregation again achieved the status of an independent parish, and in 1998, purchased the property at 54 Society Street for use as a rectory, church offices, Sunday School rooms, and Fellowship Hall.

St. Stephen's withdrew from the Diocese of South Carolina when it broke ties with the national Episcopal Church in 2012. St. Stephen's affiliated with the new Episcopal Church in South Carolina, which later won the rights to the name "Diocese of South Carolina" in court and resumed operating under that name.
