= Nathaniel Bowen =

American bishop (1779-1839)

The Right Reverend Nathaniel Bowen D.D.
- Bishop of South Carolina
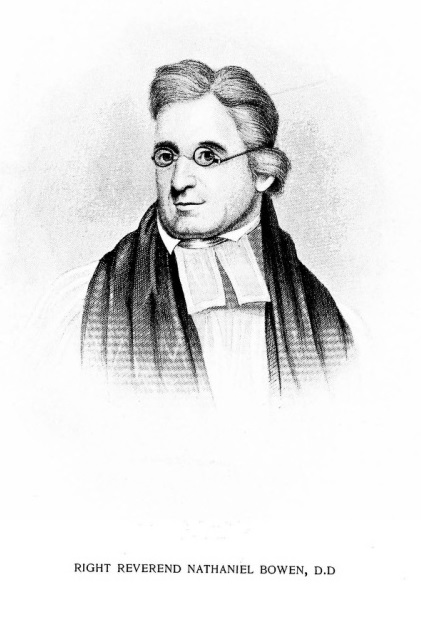
- Church: Episcopal Church
- Diocese: South Carolina
- Elected: February 18, 1818
- In office: 1818–1839
- Predecessor: Theodore Dehon
- Successor: Christopher Edwards Gadsden

Orders
- Ordination: October 1802 by Edward Bass
- Consecration: October 8, 1818 by William White

Personal details
- Born: June 29, 1779 Boston, Massachusetts, United States
- Died: August 25, 1839 (aged 60) Charleston, South Carolina, United States
- Buried: St. Michael's Churchyard
- Denomination: Anglican
- Parents: Penuel Bowen
- Spouse: Margaret Watson Blake (m. 1805)
- Children: 6

Nathaniel Bowen (June 29, 1779 – August 25, 1839) was the third bishop of South Carolina in the Episcopal Church in the United States of America.

== Biography ==
Nathaniel Bowen was born in Boston, son of the Rev. Penuel Bowen (1742-1787). The family moved to South Carolina when Nathaniel was young and his father died soon after. Nathaniel was raised by the Rev. Robert Smith, who became first bishop of South Carolina. Bowen was married in 1805 to Margaret Watson Blake (1786-1862) and they had 10 children, only four of whom survived him.

Bowen graduated from the College of Charleston in 1794; was ordained deacon on June 3, 1800, and priest in October 1802. He served as rector of St. John's Church, Providence, Rhode Island, St. Michael's Church, Charleston, South Carolina and Grace Church, New York City. In 1814 he received an honorary Doctor of Divinity degree from the University of Pennsylvania. He was consecrated bishop of South Carolina on October 8, 1818, serving until his death in Charleston on August 25, 1839.

=== Consecrators ===
- The Most Reverend William White, 4th presiding bishop of the Episcopal Church
- The Right Reverend John Henry Hobart, 3rd bishop of New York
- The Right Reverend James Kemp, 2nd bishop of Maryland

Nathaniel Bowen was the 17th bishop consecrated for the Episcopal Church.

== See also ==
- List of Bishop Succession in the Episcopal Church
- St. Stephen's Episcopal Church (Charleston, South Carolina), where Nathaniel Bowen presided over the ceremony for the laying of the cornerstone.

Episcopal Church (USA) titles
Preceded by Theodore Dehon	3rd Bishop of South Carolina; October 8, 1818 – August 25, 1839	Succeeded by Christopher E. Gadsden
