= Christopher Edwards Gadsden =

American episcopal bishop (1785–1852)

The Right Reverend Christopher Edwards Gadsden D.D.
- Bishop of South Carolina
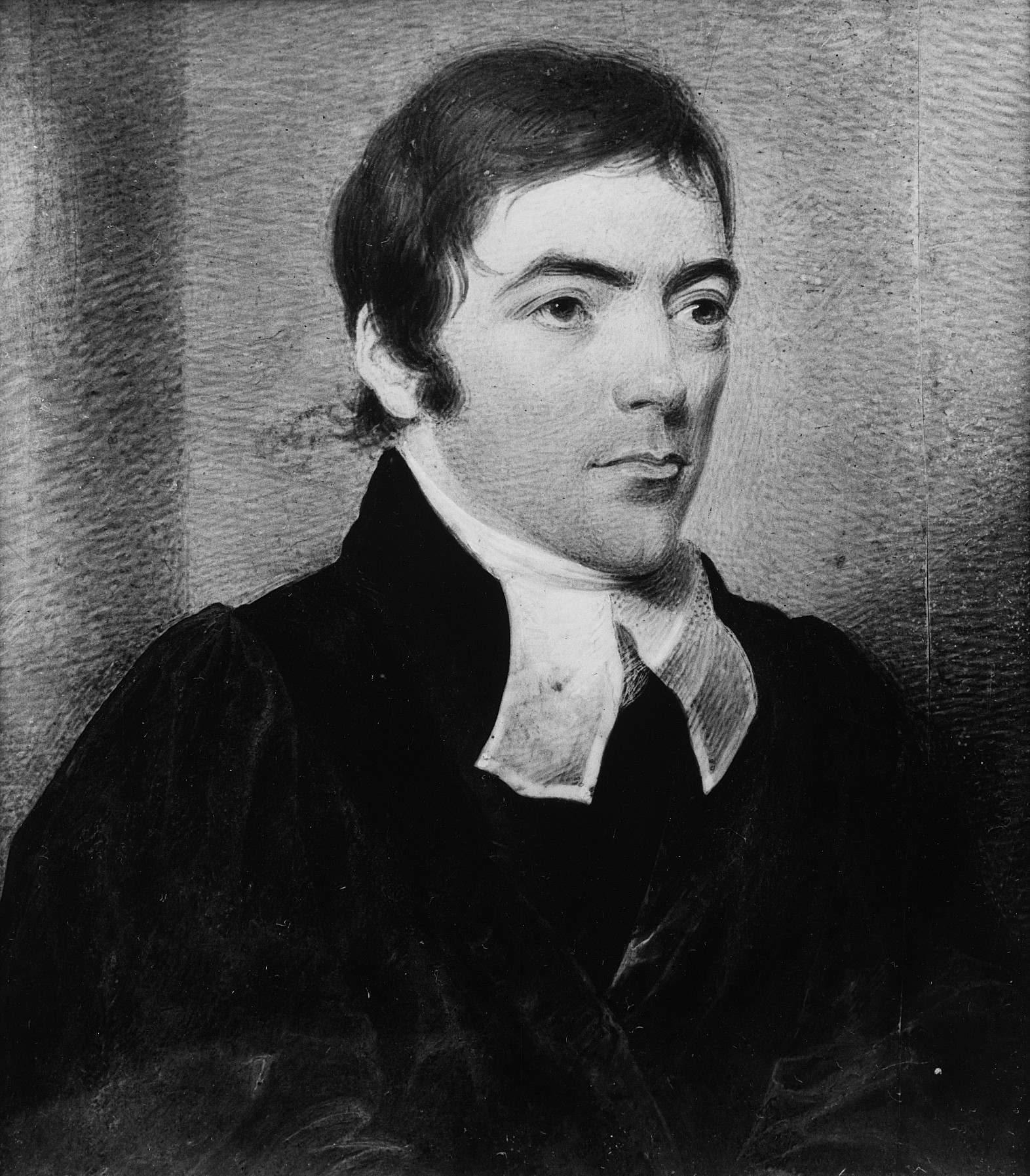
- Portrait of Rev. Christopher Edwards Gadsden by Charles Fraser (1819)
- Church: Episcopal Church
- Diocese: South Carolina
- Elected: January 1840
- In office: 1840–1852
- Predecessor: Nathaniel Bowen
- Successor: Thomas F. Davis

Orders
- Ordination: April 14, 1810 by James Madison
- Consecration: June 21, 1840 by Alexander Viets Griswold

Personal details
- Born: November 17, 1785 Charleston, South Carolina, United States
- Died: June 24, 1852 (aged 66) Charleston, South Carolina, United States
- Buried: St. Philip's Episcopal Church (Charleston, South Carolina)
- Denomination: Anglican
- Parents: Philip Gadsden & Catherine Edwards
- Spouse: Eliza Allston Bowman (m. 1816; d. 1826); Jane Dewes (m. 1830)
- Children: 8
- Relatives: Christopher Gadsden (grandfather); James Gadsden (brother); John Gadsden (brother)

Christopher Edwards Gadsden (November 25, 1785 – June 24, 1852) was the fourth Episcopal Bishop of South Carolina.

== Early life ==
Gadsden was born in Charleston, South Carolina in 1785, the son of Philip Gadsden and his wife, Catherine Edwards. He was a grandson of Christopher Gadsden, the South Carolina Revolutionary leader. One of his brothers, John Gadsden, served two terms as the Mayor of Charleston, and another brother, James Gadsden, was the namesake of the Gadsden Purchase.

As a youth, he attended both the Episcopal Church of his father and his mother's Congregational Church. Beginning in his junior year, Gadsden attended Yale University, graduating in 1804. He was ordained deacon in the Episcopal Church in 1807 by Bishop Moore, and in 1810 was ordained priest by Bishop Madison.

== Career ==
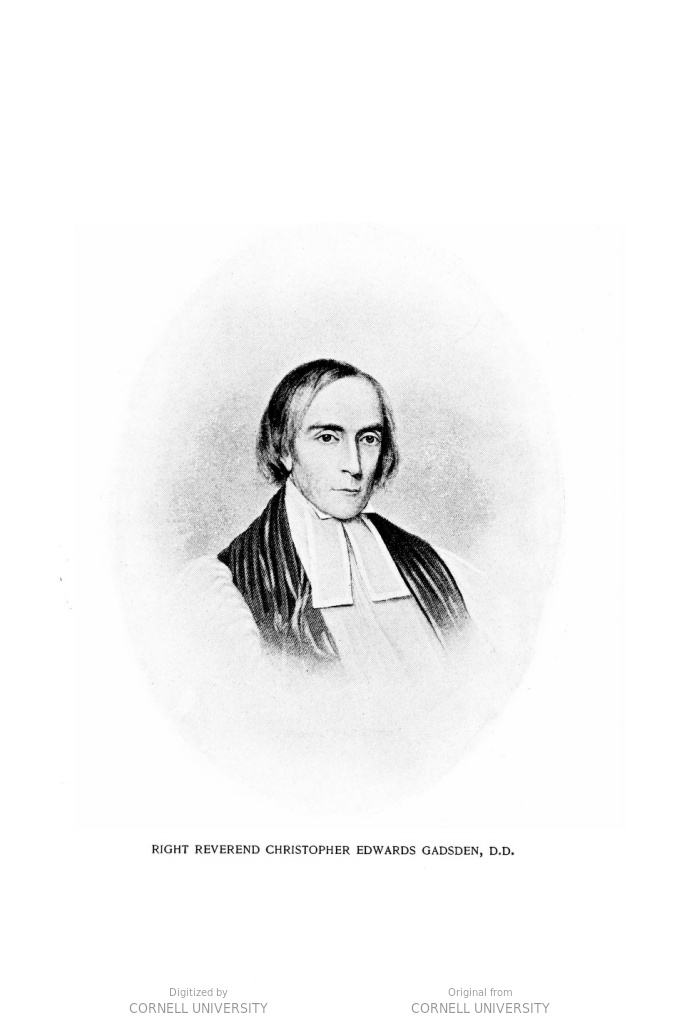
The Rt. Rev. Christopher Edwards Gadsden

Soon thereafter, he became rector of St. John's Church in Berkeley County, South Carolina. In 1814, Gadsden became rector of St. Philip's Church in Charleston, the oldest congregation in the diocese. He received a doctorate of divinity the following year from South Carolina College.

In 1840, after the death of Bishop Bowen, a dispute arose in the diocese over who would succeed him. Gadsden was elected, and was consecrated bishop in Trinity Church in Boston. Gadsden was the 35th bishop in the ECUSA, and was consecrated by Alexander Viets Griswold, George Washington Doane, and Samuel Allen McCoskry. Gadsden was active in expanding the membership of the Episcopal Church in South Carolina, usually visiting each congregation once a year. In 1852, at the diocese convention, he announced that ill health would prevent him from continuing his ministry, and he died shortly thereafter, in June of that year.

== Personal life ==
He married Eliza Bowman in 1816. She died in 1826, and Gadsden remarried in 1830 to Jane Dewees, the youngest daughter of William Dewees. He had no children by his first marriage, but had eight with his second wife.

== Notes ==
Episcopal Church (USA) titles
Preceded by Nathaniel Bowen	4th Bishop of South Carolina; June 21, 1840 – June 24, 1852	Succeeded by Thomas F. Davis
