= John Gadsden =

American politician

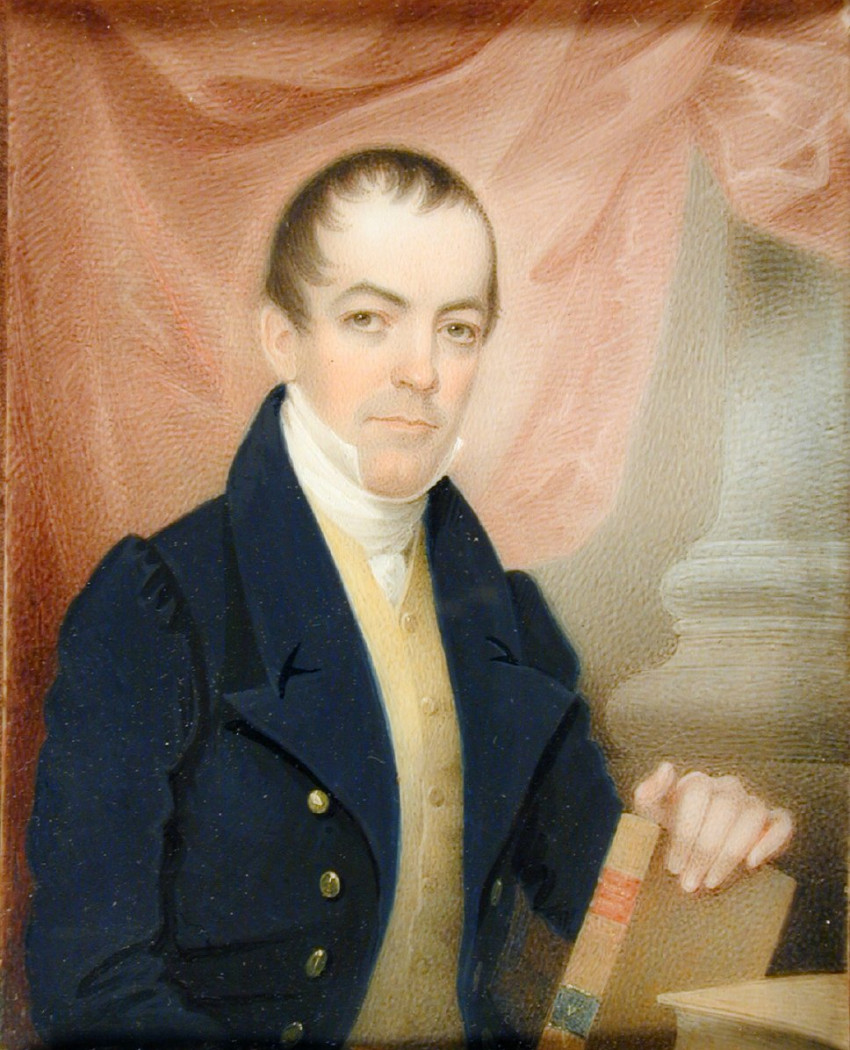
- portrait by Charles Fraser

28th Mayor of Charleston
- In office 1827–1829
- Preceded by: Joseph Johnson
- Succeeded by: Henry L. Pinckney

Personal details
- Born: March 4, 1787 Charleston, South Carolina
- Died: January 24, 1831 (aged 43) Charleston, South Carolina
- Spouse: Ann Margaret Edwards
- Relatives: Christopher Gadsden (grandfather); Christopher Edwards Gadsden (brother); James Gadsden (brother)
- Profession: Lawyer

John Gadsden (March 4, 1787 – January 24, 1831) was the 28th mayor of Charleston, South Carolina, serving two terms from 1827 to 1829.

Gadsden was born on March 4, 1787, to Philip Gadsden (1761–1824) and Catherine (Edwards) Gadsden (1766–1816). His paternal grandfather was Christopher Gadsden, originator of the Gadsden flag, one brother was James Gadsden, notable for the Gadsden Purchase, and another brother was Christopher Edwards Gadsden, the fourth Episcopal Bishop of South Carolina.

Gadsden was a member of the South Carolina House of Representatives in 1819 and was the U.S. Attorney for South Carolina from 1820 to 1831. On September 3, 1827, Gadsden was elected to a second term as intendent of Charleston, defeating N.G. Cleary by a vote of 655 to 281. He died January 24, 1831.

Preceded by Joseph Johnson	Mayor of Charleston, South Carolina; 1827–1829	Succeeded by Henry L. Pinckney
