= Absalom Baird =

United States Army officer

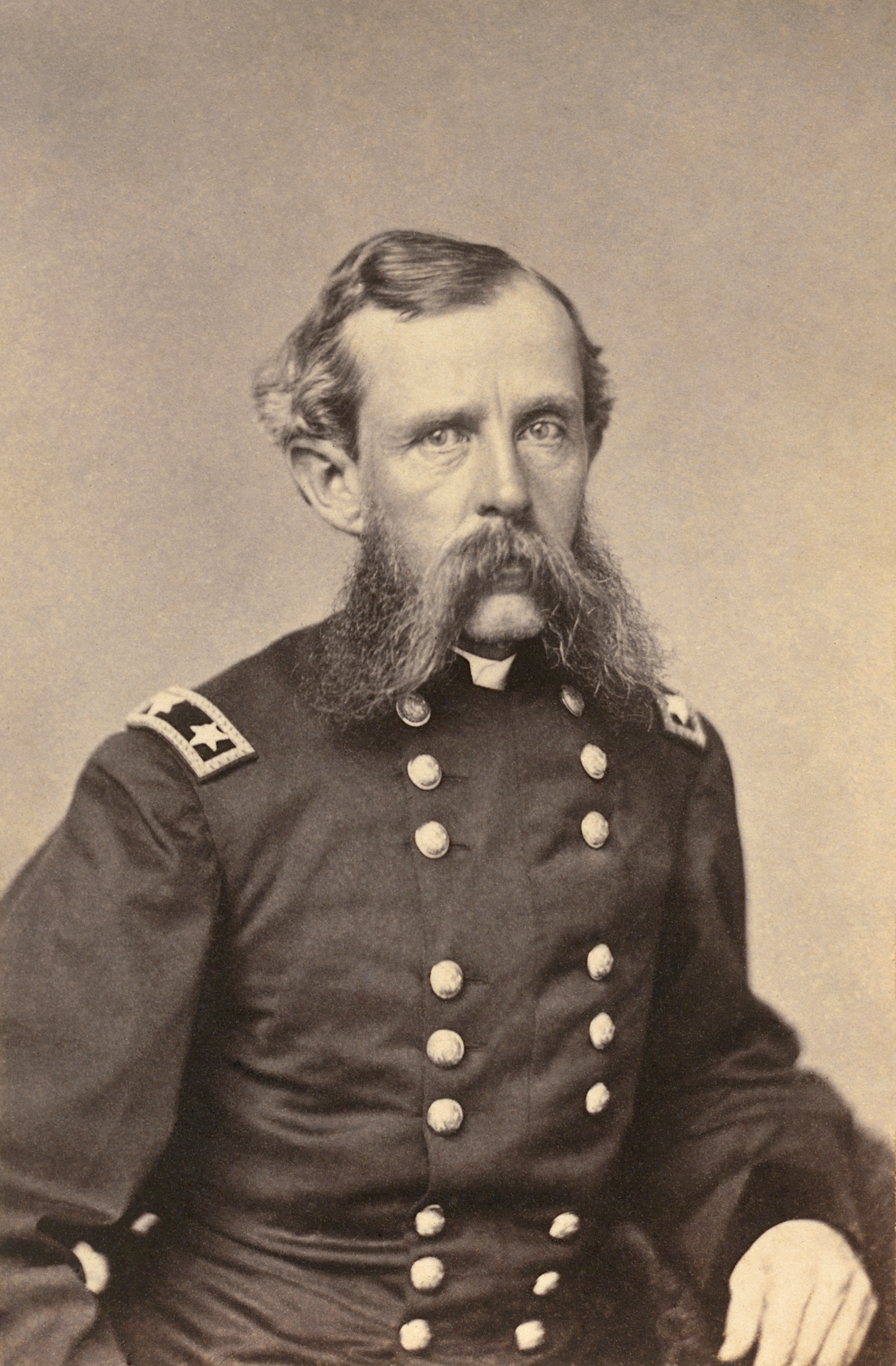

Inspector General of the U.S. Army
- In office September 20, 1885 – August 20, 1888
- Nominated by: Grover Cleveland
- Preceded by: Nelson H. Davis
- Succeeded by: Roger Jones

Personal details
- Born: August 20, 1824 Washington, Pennsylvania, US
- Died: June 14, 1905 (aged 80) Relay, Maryland, US
- Resting place: Arlington National Cemetery
- Awards: Medal of Honor

Military service
- Allegiance: United States; Union
- Branch/service: United States Army; Union Army
- Years of service: 1849–1888
- Rank: Brigadier General; Brevet Major General
- Commands: 27th Brigade, 7th Division; 3rd Division, Army of Kentucky; 1st Division, XIV Corps; Inspector General of the Army
- Battles/wars: American Civil War; First Battle of Bull Run; Siege of Yorktown; Battle of the Cumberland Gap; Battle of Thompson's Station; Battle of Franklin; Battle of Chickamauga; Chattanooga campaign; Atlanta campaign; Battle of Jonesborough; Sherman's March to the Sea; Campaign of the Carolinas; Battle of Bentonville

Absalom Baird (August 20, 1824 – June 14, 1905) was a career United States Army officer who distinguished himself as a Union Army general in the American Civil War. Baird received the Medal of Honor for his military actions.

== Early life ==
Baird was born in Washington, Pennsylvania. He graduated from the preparatory department of Washington College (now Washington & Jefferson College) in 1841. He enrolled in the United States Military Academy and graduated in 1849, ranked ninth in a class of 43. From 1852 to 1859, he was a mathematics instructor at West Point, where one of his students was James McNeill Whistler. From 1859 to 1861, he served in Texas and Virginia.

== Civil War ==
When the Civil War broke out in 1861, Baird was promoted to brevet captain. He fought at the First Battle of Bull Run under Brig. Gen. Daniel Tyler. On November 12, 1861, Baird was promoted to major in the Regular Army while serving as an assistant inspector general. He became chief of staff to Maj. Gen. Erasmus D. Keyes during the first part of the Siege of Yorktown, where his service earned him a further promotion to brigadier general of U.S. Volunteers on April 30, 1862, to rank from April 28, 1862.

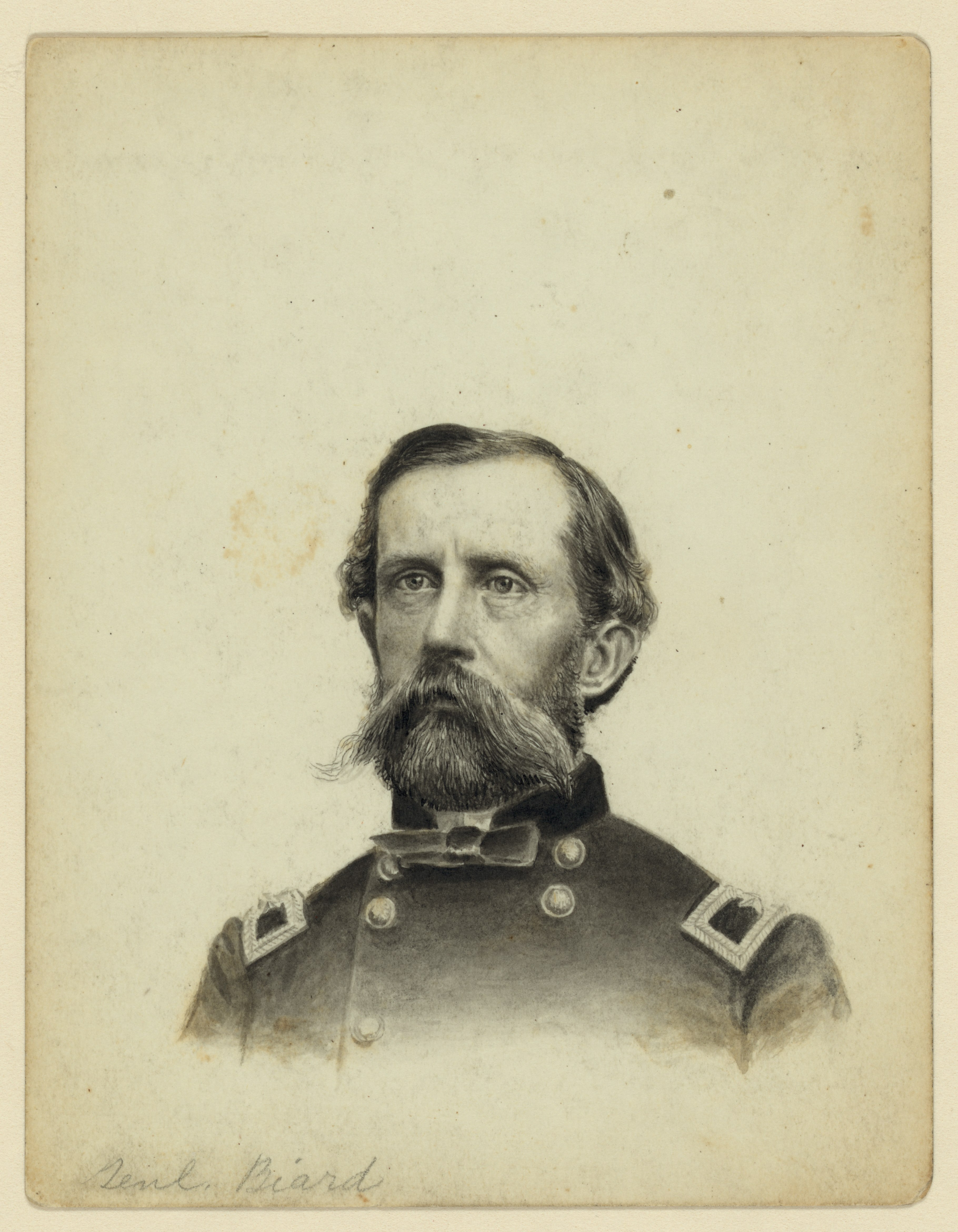
Gen. Baird

In April 1862, Baird took command of the 27th Brigade, 7th Division in the Army of the Ohio under Maj. Gen. Don Carlos Buell. Baird helped secure the Cumberland Gap in June 1862 under George W. Morgan. He commanded the 3rd Division, Army of Kentucky where his troops fared poorly in the Battle of Thompson's Station in March 1863, though Baird was not personally involved. His troops were present at the First Battle of Franklin (Harpeth River) in April, before being assimilated into the Army of the Cumberland.

Baird's division became the 1st Division of Maj. Gen. George Henry Thomas's XIV Corps. It was in this post that he won fame for his heroic efforts at the Battle of Chickamauga and the Chattanooga campaign. Baird won a brevet promotion to colonel in Regular Army for Chattanooga. In the Atlanta campaign, Baird led a brigade charge in the Battle of Jonesborough which earned him the Medal of Honor. He led his division in Maj. Gen. William T. Sherman's March to the Sea and Carolinas campaign. Baird led his division in the Battle of Bentonville in the latter campaign.

On January 23, 1865, President Abraham Lincoln nominated Baird for appointment to the brevet grade of major general of volunteers, to rank from September 1, 1864, and the U.S. Congress confirmed the award on February 14, 1865. On April 10, 1866, President Andrew Johnson nominated Baird for appointment as brevet brigadier general in the Regular Army, to rank from March 13, 1865, and the U.S. Senate confirmed the appointment on May 4, 1866. On July 17, 1866, President Andrew Johnson nominated Baird for appointment as brevet major general in the regular U.S. Army, to rank from March 13, 1865, and the U.S. Senate confirmed the appointment on July 23, 1866. Baird was mustered out of the volunteer service on September 1, 1866.

== Postbellum life ==
Following the war, Baird served as commander of the department of Louisiana. He was appointed an assistant inspector general with the grade of lieutenant colonel on June 17, 1867. He was appointed Inspector General of the Army on March 11, 1885, and was promoted to a full grade brigadier general on September 22, 1885. In 1887, he traveled to France to observe military maneuvers, and was named a Commander of the Légion d'honneur. Baird retired from the Army on August 20, 1888, having reached the mandatory retirement age of 64.

On April 22, 1896, Baird was awarded the Medal of Honor for leading "an assault upon the enemy's works" at the Battle of Jonesborough on September 1, 1864. He was also a veteran companion of the Military Order of the Loyal Legion of the United States and a member of the General Society of Colonial Wars.

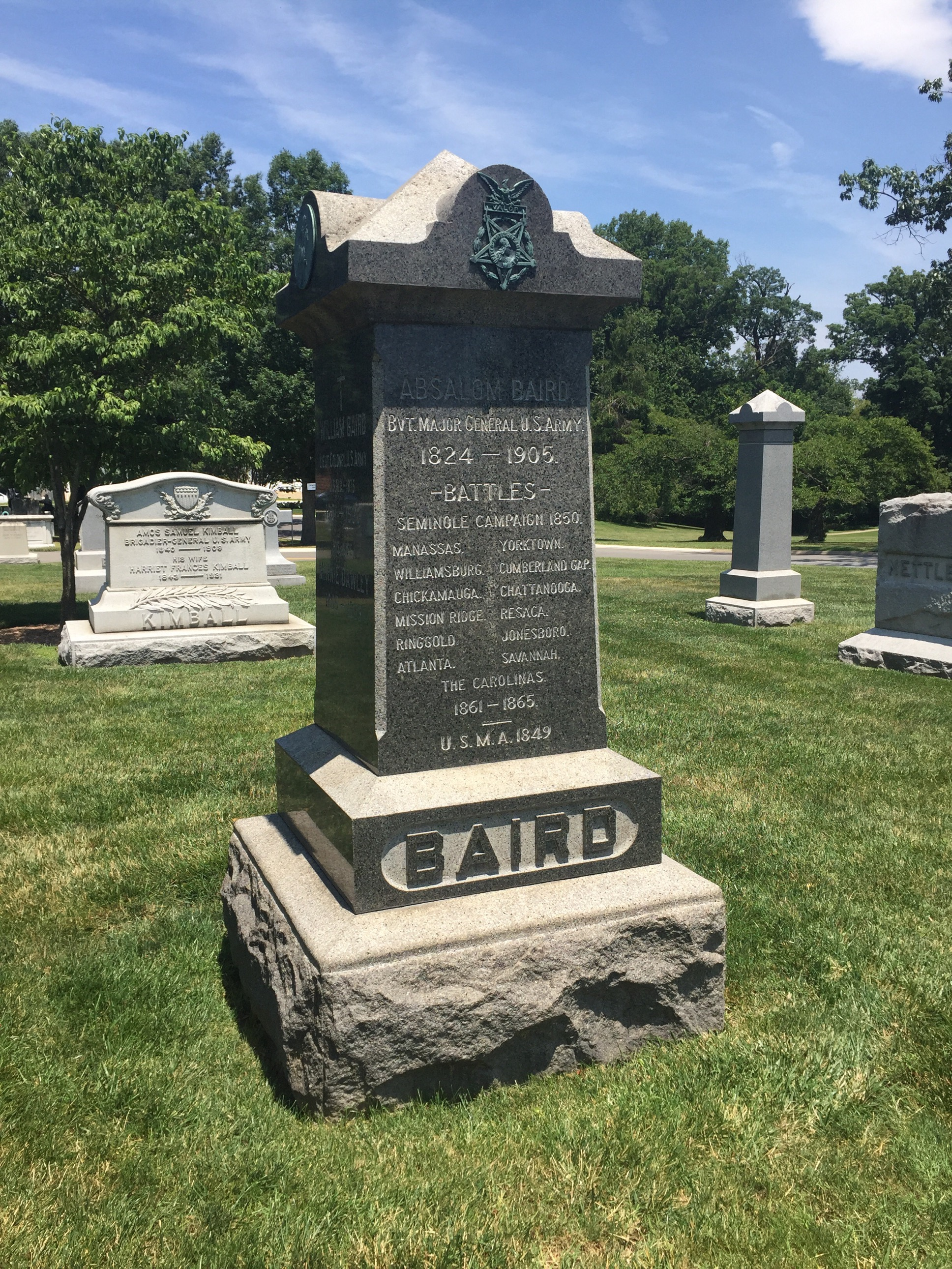
Absalom Baird's grave marker

He died at Relay, Maryland near Baltimore, Maryland, and is buried in section 1, lot 55, at Arlington National Cemetery, Arlington, Virginia.

== Medal of Honor citation ==
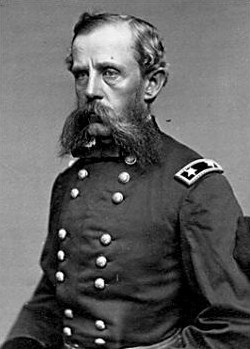
Another image of Baird

- Rank and organization: Brigadier General, U.S. Volunteers.
- Place and date: At Jonesboro, Georgia, September 1, 1864.
- Entered service at: Washington, Pennsylvania.
- Birth: Washington, Pennsylvania.
- Date of issue: April 22, 1896.

Citation:

Voluntarily led a detached brigade in an assault upon the enemy's works.

== See also ==
- List of Medal of Honor recipients
- List of American Civil War Medal of Honor recipients: A–F
- List of American Civil War generals (Union)

== Notes ==
=== References ===
- Eicher, John H., and David J. Eicher, Civil War High Commands. Stanford: Stanford University Press, 2001. ISBN 0-8047-3641-3.
- "Absalom Baird, Medal of Honor recipient". American Civil War (A–L). United States Army Center of Military History. June 8, 2009. Archived from the original on 14 December 2007.
- American National Biography, vol. 1, pp. 906–907.
- "Photographs of Absalom Baird". Archived from the original on February 8, 2008.
- "New York Times obituary". The New York Times. June 15, 1905.(subscription required)

Military offices
| Preceded by Nelson H. Davis | Inspector General of the U. S. Army; September 20, 1885-August 20, 1888 | Succeeded by Roger Jones |
