= Charles Josephus Nourse =

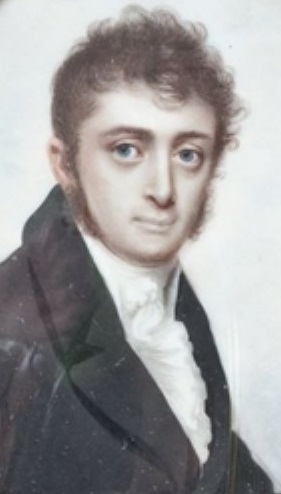
- Charles J. Nourse
- Born: June 1, 1786; Brooklyn, New York, US
- Died: March 19, 1851 (aged 64); Washington, D.C., US
- Burial place: Rock Creek Cemetery
- Relatives: Joseph Nourse (father)
- Military career
- Allegiance: United States of America
- Branch: United States Army
- Service years: 1812–1827
- Rank: Major
- Commands: Adjutant General of the U.S. Army (acting)
- Other work: Chief Clerk of the War Department

Charles Josephus Nourse (June 1, 1786–March 19, 1851) was an American military officer who served as acting Adjutant General of the U.S. Army from 1822 to 1825.

== Biography ==
Nourse was born in Brooklyn, New York on June 1, 1786. He was the son of Register of the Treasury, Joseph Nourse.

In 1808 Nourse carried private messages to England for President James Madison. In 1809 he was commissioned as a second lieutenant in the Army. He was promoted to first lieutenant in 1812 and received brevets to captain (1813), and major (1814). Nourse took part in the War of 1812 as an aide to General James Wilkinson.

Nourse served in the Army until 1827, and was acting Adjutant General from 1822 to 1825. He resigned from the Army to become chief clerk for the Department of War and he served until he was replaced at the start of Andrew Jackson's administration in 1829.

After leaving the War Department, Nourse resided at The Highlands, his Washington, D.C. plantation.

He died in Washington, D.C., and was buried at Rock Creek Cemetery.

== See also ==
- List of Adjutant Generals of the U.S. Army

Military offices
Preceded by James Gadsden	Adjutant General of the U. S. Army; May 8, 1822-March 7, 1825 (acting)	Succeeded by Roger Jones
