= James Gadsden =

United States Army officer, diplomat, and businessman (1788–1858)

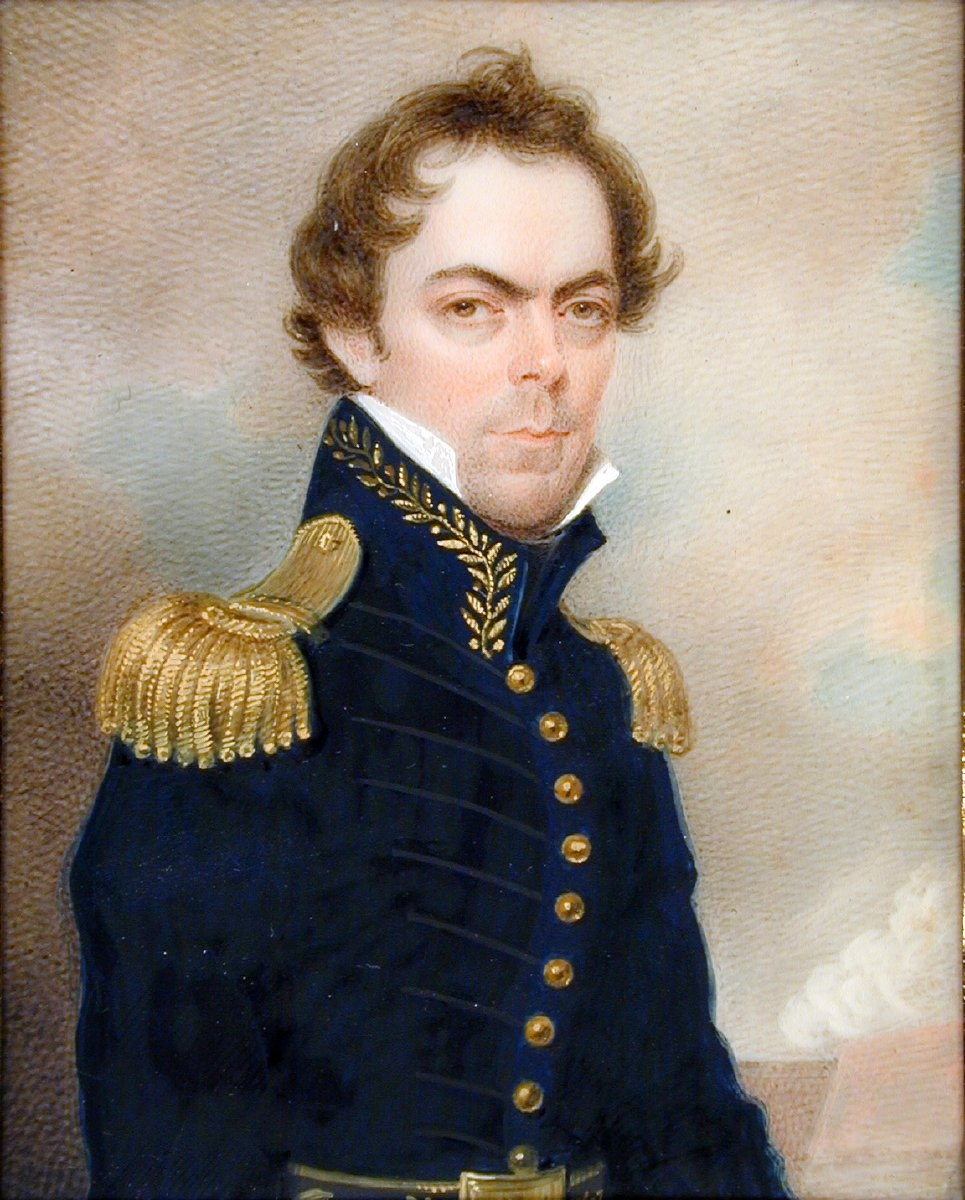
- c. 1831 portrait of Gadsden by Charles Fraser
- Born: May 15, 1788; Charleston, South Carolina, U.S.
- Died: December 26, 1858 (aged 70)
- Education: Yale University
- Occupations: Diplomat; soldier; businessman
- Known for: Gadsden Purchase
- Relatives: Christopher Gadsden (grandfather); Christopher Edwards Gadsden (brother); John Gadsden (brother)

Colonel James Gadsden (May 15, 1788 – December 26, 1858) was a United States Army officer, diplomat, and businessman after whom the Gadsden Purchase is named, pertaining to land which the United States bought from Mexico, and which became the southern portions of Arizona and New Mexico. James Gadsden served as Adjutant General of the U.S. Army from August 13, 1821 to March 22, 1822. Between 1853 and 1856, he served as the U.S. Minister to Mexico. He was known commonly as General Gadsden, although he never had a rank above colonel.

== Biography ==
Little is known about the life of Gadsden, especially his early life. It is known that he was born in Charleston, South Carolina, during 1788, and that he was grandson of the American Revolutionary War hero Christopher Gadsden, for whom the Gadsden flag was named. It is also known that Gadsden earned his bachelor's degree from Yale University in Connecticut, completing this degree in 1806. In university, he was a member of the debating and secret society, Brothers in Unity. One of his siblings, John Gadsden, served two terms as the Mayor of Charleston, and another sibling, Christopher Edwards Gadsden, was the fourth Episcopal Bishop of South Carolina.

=== Army service ===
Gadsden joined the United States Army in December 1812. He served as a commissioned officer commanded by General Andrew Jackson, who was later elected president in 1828. He served as secretary for Jackson-led negotiations for a treaty with the Chickasaw in 1816.

Gadsden served under Jackson during the War of 1812 and First Seminole War. He played a role in protecting the southern U.S. border from Native Americans and maroons based in Spanish Florida. As part of this effort, Jackson directed Gadsden, a member of the Army Corps of Engineers, to build a fort on the Prospect Bluff site. Jackson subsequently named it Fort Gadsden. Gadsden also helped to establish Fort Brooke with George Mercer Brooke at the site of the present-day city of Tampa, Florida. He was appointed Adjutant General in August 1821, but this appointment was not confirmed by the Senate, causing it to expire the following year.

=== Seminole expulsion ===
Gadsden next decided to quit the U.S. Army, and became a planter in Florida; he served in the Florida Territorial Legislature. Gadsden was appointed as a commissioner during 1823 to help with the organization and the expulsion of most of the Seminole Indian Tribe from their homes in Florida and southern Georgia, along the Trail of Tears to land reservations that had been reserved for them in what is now Oklahoma.

Years later Gadsden County, Florida, was named in his honor, and also the city of Gadsden, Alabama, and the town of Gadsden, Arizona. Gadsden, Tennessee was also named in Honor of James Gadsden in 1858–59. Co. I 6th Tennessee Infantry CSA was formed in 1861 from men around Gadsden and were called the GADSDEN SPARTANS.

=== Railroad executive ===
Later, Gadsden served as the president of the South Carolina Railroad company from 1840 to 1850. When first completed in 1833, the line was the longest railroad in the world under one management. As an engineer he directed the construction of the branch to Columbia, completed 1842, surveyed a proposed extension to the Ohio River, and helped promote the Memphis & Charleston Railroad, incorporated 1845 (completed in 1857, it was the first U.S. railroad link between the Atlantic and the Mississippi River, but long after Gadsden had turned his attention elsewhere).

By 1846, Gadsden and his associates promoted the construction of a southern transcontinental railroad from the Atlantic to the Pacific Oceans. He urged Georgia and South Carolina to abandon their rivalry and to "discover their true policy in the harmony of a free and unrestricted trade." A late 1840s map shows this railroad would hypothetically have been by way of the southern route from Charleston through Georgia, Alabama, Mississippi, Louisiana, and Texas to El Paso, Texas, and then through Mexico to the coast, in what in a few years would be newly acquired American land, after the 1846–1848 war with Mexico. In 1852, the SCRR followed the philosophy laid out by Gadsden during his tenure and moved the railroad's terminus from Hamburg, South Carolina, signaling the end of South Carolina's focus on economic sovereignty.

Much of the boundary between the United States and Mexico had been left unreasonably vague by the Treaty of Guadalupe Hidalgo that had been signed and ratified by the United States and Mexico during 1848. Gadsden would play an important role in revising the boundary, with the aim to build a southern transcontinental railroad (see below and the article on the Gadsden Purchase).

=== California ===
During the crisis of 1850, Gadsden advocated secession by South Carolina when California was admitted to the Union as a free state. Gadsden considered slavery "a social blessing" and abolitionists "the greatest curse of the nation."

When the secession proposal failed, Gadsden, working with his cousin Isaac Edward Holmes, a lawyer in San Francisco since 1851, and California state senator Thomas Jefferson Green, attempted to divide California in two. They proposed that the southern half would allow slavery. Gadsden planned to establish a slaveholding colony there based on rice, cotton, and sugar. He would use slaves to build a railroad and highway, originating in either San Antonio or on the Red River, that would transport people to the California gold fields. Toward this end, on December 31, 1851, Gadsden asked Green to secure from the California state legislature a large land grant located between the 34th and 36th parallels; it would eventually serve as the dividing line for the two California states.

A few months after this, Gadsden and 1,200 potential settlers from South Carolina and Florida submitted a petition to the California legislature for permanent citizenship and permission to establish a rural district that would be farmed by "not less than Two Thousand of their African Domestics". The petition stimulated some debate, but it finally expired in committee.

=== Gadsden Purchase ===
Following the war between Mexico and the United States, disputes over the boundary line brought the two nations near to renewed conflict in the Mesilla Valley of New Mexico, north of El Paso. In May 1853, President Franklin Pierce appointed Gadsden as the Envoy Extraordinary and Minister Plenipotentiary to Mexico, with instructions to purchase more land from Mexico as part of a settlement of the Mesilla controversy, for the prospective railroad route across southernmost parts of what are today New Mexico and Arizona, to end the possibility of disputes concerning control of the Apache along the border, and other more minor issues.

Gadsden successfully performed this mission by negotiating with the Mexican government in Mexico City for the purchase of more land from Mexico for southmost New Mexico and Arizona, and by establishing the boundary between the United States and Mexico as two long line segments between the Rio Grande at the westmost tip of Texas all the way to the River Colorado at the eastern boundary of California. This treaty is known as the "Gadsden Treaty", and it resulted in the Gadsden Purchase from Mexico of about 30,000 square miles (78,000 km^{2}) of land in northmost Mexico for $10,000,000.

In the fall of 1856 Gadsden retired as minister to Mexico, and returned to Charleston where he died in 1858. The sectional crisis of the late 1850s and subsequent Civil War delayed construction of a proposed southern transcontinental railroad to California along the 32d parallel, just to the north of the Mexican border. Between 1878 and 1881, though, the Southern Pacific Railroad (now part of the Union Pacific Railroad) built the section of the southern transcontinental between Yuma and El Paso within the Gadsden Purchase territory. At the same time, 1880–1882, the Atchison, Topeka and Santa Fe Railroad completed a transcontinental link through the Gadsden Purchase and then southwest to a terminus at the port of Guaymas, in the state of Sonora, Mexico. Completed October 25, 1882, this line was later acquired by the Southern Pacific. Today, the rail link across the Gadsden Purchase on the southern transcontinental is one of the busiest in the Western Hemisphere.

The land bought by the Gadsden Purchase contained the site of Arizona's second largest city, Tucson, a one-time Spanish presidio town, the minor cities and towns of Casa Grande, and Yuma, Arizona, Lordsburg, Deming, New Mexico, and New Mexico's second largest metro area at Las Cruces, New Mexico, in the Mesilla Valley, and it defined the status of the area north of the Gila River, that later became the metropolitan area of Phoenix, Scottsdale, Mesa, Glendale, and Tempe, Arizona. Most of the land south of Phoenix where tentative plans had been made to build a transcontinental railroad is desert land that is not suitable for much human inhabitation. Nearly all of this federally owned land was eventually reserved as a large, sparsely inhabited American Indian reservation, testing and combat-practice ranges for the U.S. Air Force, Organ Pipe Cactus National Monument, Cabeza Prieta National Wildlife Refuge, Coronado National Forest, Sonoran Desert National Monument, Ironwood Forest National Monument, Saguaro National Park, and the Fort Huachuca Military Reservation of the U.S. Army.

Military offices
Preceded by Daniel Parker	Adjutant General of the U. S. Army; August 13, 1821 – March 22, 1822	Succeeded by Charles J. Nourse (acting)
