= Henry W. Gadsden =

American business executive

Henry W. Gadsden (1911–1980) was an American business executive. He served as the chief executive officer (CEO) of Merck & Company from 1964 to 1976.

== Biography ==
Born in 1911 in New York, Gadsden studied at the Yale University. He was married with Patrica Parker and they had four children.

Gadsden worked with Merck for more than thirty-nine years. He became vice president in 1953 and later served as their CEO between 1964 and 1976. Previously, he served as a director of Ford Motor Company, Campbell's, and C. R. Bard.
