= Rachel Gadsden =

British painter

Rachel Gadsden is a UK-based visual artist and performance artist who is exhibited internationally and who works across the mainstream and disability art sectors. Gadsden has led a range of national and international participative programmes exploring themes of fragility and resilience. She has had a lung condition all her life and is injected by a syringe driver at one-minute intervals with the medication she needs to keep her alive.

== Education ==
Gadsden's artistic career began with the support of a Prince's Youth Business Trust Award (1988). Gadsden received a BA (Hons) Fine Art Painting from Wimbledon School of Art in 1998, an Anatomy for Artists Diploma from UCH Medical School, London in 2000 and MA Fine Art, City and Guilds of London Art School in 2001.

== History ==
Gadsden's artistic process explores the physical, historical and personal experience of aspects of the human condition. Experimenting with what the artist calls a psycho-geographical approach she explored the derelict asylum Cane Hill in Surrey in 2005. In documenting the process Tim Hayton said: "Rachel's mixed media paintings, drawings, projections and videos attempt to capture the building's struggle to survive and its inevitable physical demise, the decay being a tangible evocation of our own psychological ephemerality."

In 2005 Gadsden received an Artsadmin Digital Media Bursary to develop a project narrating a history of North Wales Hospital in Denbigh. Ten years after the closure of the hospital an exhibition of her artwork Beyond the Asylum was shown in Denbigh Museum and Library, North Wales (2005) and Faith Gallery, Holton Lee, Dorset (2006).

In 2011/12 Gadsden exhibited Ubuntu as part of a GV Art London Group Show 'TRAUMA: The Art and Science of Trauma'. The exhibition was in line with GV Art's commitment to support artists who generate meaningful collaborations and dialogues with scientists to investigate the human condition. Gadsden exhibited artwork from her initial collaboration with The Bambanini Group of Khayelitsha Township investigating the experience of living with HIV/AIDS. The exhibition also included Luke Jerram's glass microbiology sculptures of HIV.

In 2012 Gadsden won an award from the Arts Council's Unlimited programme, designed to support disabled artists across the UK to create ambitious work covering all genres.

Working with the Bambanani Group in South Africa, Unlimited Global Alchemy explored the psychology and politics of HIV/AIDS through a series of collaborative artworks, film and workshops. Work from the project is now permanently exhibited in Mandela's Walk to Freedom in Cape Town.

Luke Jennings in a Guardian review of Gadsden's project Unlimited Global Alchemy said: "Gadsden is creating an artwork with frantic speed, fighting her own real-life fight against the dying of the light. In the act of painting, she tells us, she is "living in the second". A profoundly affecting reminder of our shared humanity."

In 2012, an exhibition catalogue of Unlimited Global Academy was published by Artsadmin. containing a series of essays on the work of the artist and written accounts as well as short talking heads films (on a CD accompanying the catalogue) of the personal and political journeys made by each of the Bambanani Group Members to counter discrimination experienced by people with AIDS/ HIV in South Africa. The catalogue for Unlimited Global Academy contains a foreword by author and Oxford University African Studies lecturer Jonny Steinberg who describes the project as the "product of a highly unusual consciousness." Steinberg, citing Gadsden's recognition of Bambanani Group Member, Nodumiso Hlwele's motivation to create art as a way of managing chronic illness as a starting point for the collaboration. Steinberg goes on to say: "And not just unusual... but also important. For at a purely pragmatic level, those who make public works from this particular chronic illness, AIDS - be it in the form of art or advocacy or mass campaigns - are responsible for bringing these precious pills to countless people in the first place. Aside from producing powerful works for our contemplation, Gadsden, Hlwele and the rest of the Bambanani Group are also keeping a vital political matter alive."

In 2013 the Qatari Government's UK Year of Culture featured "This Breathing World", a major solo exhibition of 54 artworks & films as part of the first ever Art & Disability Festival in the Middle East at Katara Cultural Village, Doha.

In 2015 Gadsden was commissioned by the UK Parliament to create artwork as part of 'The Beginnings of that Freedome' exhibition, which were gifted to organisations across the UK in January 2016. 18 Banners were commissioned by Parliament to celebrate 800 years since Magna Carta was sealed and the 750th Birthday of the Montfort Parliament, including 2 banners by Gadsden '1601 Poor Law' and '1829 Catholic Emancipation Act'.

== Awards ==
- 2014 Breakthrough UK National Independent Living Award Influencing disabled people's participation in Society 2014 Shortlisted European Diversity Award – Hero of the Year
- 2013 National Diversity Award 2013 – Positive Role Model for Disability
- 2011 "Commended" International Freedom to Create competition. (Cape Town SA)
- 2009 International DadaAward 2009 Artist of the Year Award
- 2009 Momentum Arts Council UK and Dada-South Bursary
- 2007 Holton Lee International Disability Arts Prize
- 2006 Shrewsbury International Painting Prize
- 2005 DadaAward
- 2005 Visual Artist of the Year
- 2004 Artsadmin Digital Media Bursary
