= Gadsden Coca-Cola Bottling Plant =

Historic building in Gadsden, Alabama, U.S.

- U.S. National Register of Historic Places
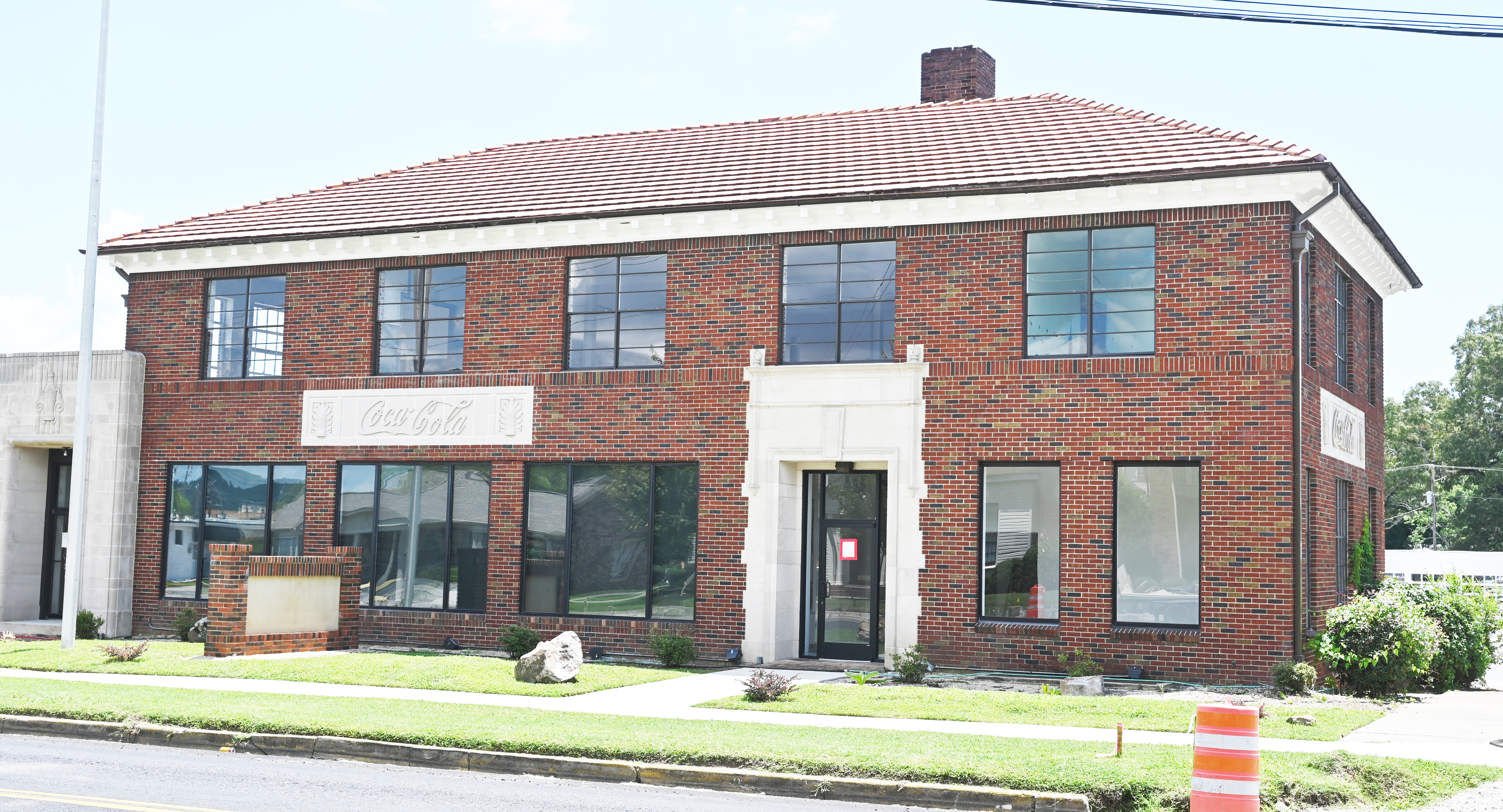
- Interactive map of Gadsden Coca-Cola Bottling Plant
- Location: 644 Walnut St., Gadsden, Alabama
- Coordinates: 34°00′41″N 86°00′34″W
- Built: 1929
- NRHP reference No.: 100007191
- Added to NRHP: November 17, 2023

The Gadsden Coca-Cola Bottling Plant is a historic building in Gadsden, Alabama, United States. It was built in 1929 by the Coca-Cola Company to replace a facility that had opened in 1915. In 1948–49, a two-story rear addition and one-story wing were built. The plant remained in use until 1987, when a new plant was built in the eastern part of town. The brick building is two stories, with a tile hipped roof and bracketed eaves. The original entrance features a stone surround with a keystone, but the door has since been replaced with a single-pane window. A similar entrance between the original block and the 1940s single-story addition which has scoring to imitate blocks and a Coca-Cola bottle carved into the lintel. The west elevation has a carved terra cotta sign with the Coca-Cola script logo. A separated auto garage and storage facility stands behind the main building, and is constructed of the same brick.

The building was listed on the National Register of Historic Places in 2023.
