= Roger Jones (adjutant general) =

Adjutant General of the United States Army

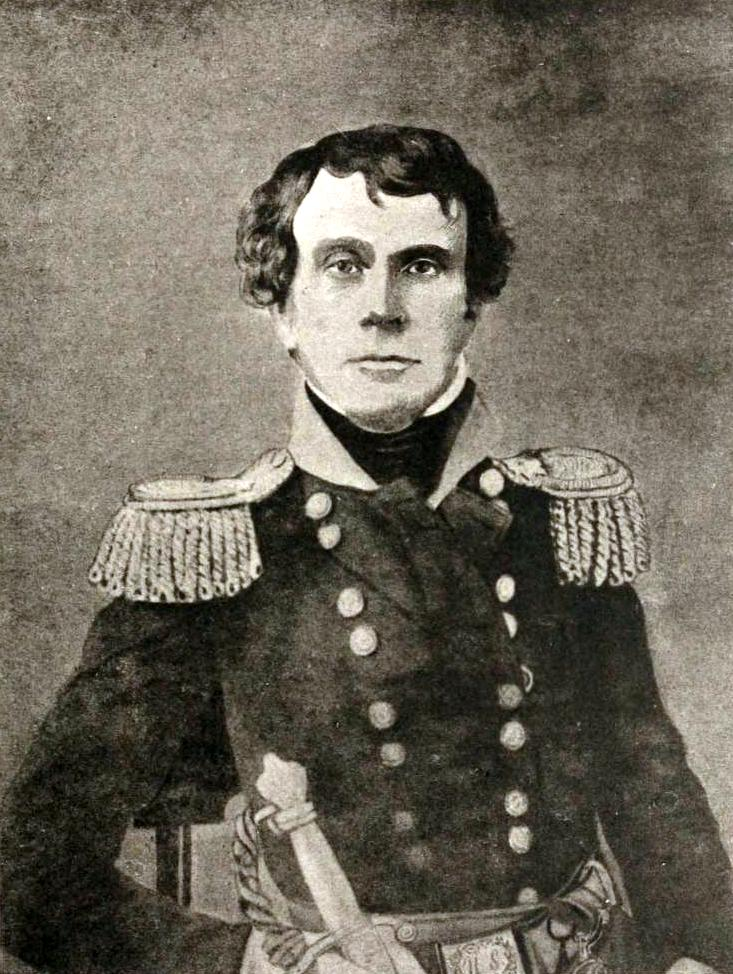
- Roger Jones
- Born: 1788; Westmoreland County, Virginia
- Died: July 15, 1852 (aged 63–64); Washington, D.C.
- Burial place: Congressional Cemetery
- Relatives: Roger Jones (son); Catesby ap Roger Jones (son); Thomas ap Catesby Jones (brother)
- Military career
- Allegiance: United States of America
- Branch: United States Marine Corps; United States Army
- Service years: 1809-1812 (USMC); 1812-1852 (USA)
- Rank: First Lieutenant (USMC); Brevet Major General (USA)
- Unit: Adjutant General of the U.S. Army
- Conflicts: War of 1812; Battle of Lundy's Lane; Battle of Chippewa; Siege of Fort Erie

Roger Jones (1788–July 15, 1852) was an American military officer in the United States Marine Corps and United States Army who was the longest-serving Adjutant General of the U.S. Army in history, holding the position from 1825 to 1852.

== Family ==
Jones was a central figure in the Jones military family with relatives holding commissions in the Revolutionary War, War of 1812, Mexican War, Civil War, World War I, and World War II. His brother Thomas ap Catesby Jones won distinction in the US Navy. Of his thirteen children many went on to serve in the military in both Union and Confederate forces. His son Catesby ap Roger Jones was the commander of the ironclad CSS Virginia at Hampton Roads on the second day of battle with the USS Monitor. His son Charles Lucian Jones served in the Confederate navy on the ironclad Tennessee. His son, also named Roger Jones, served as Inspector General of the U.S. Army from 1888 to 1889.

== Career ==
Jones was appointed a second lieutenant in the United States Marine Corps on January 29, 1809 and was promoted to first lieutenant later that year. He resigned in July 1812 to accept a commission as a captain of artillery in the United States Army. He received brevets to major and lieutenant colonel for his services in the War of 1812. He was appointed adjutant general with the rank of colonel in August 1818, and in March 1825 became Adjutant General of the U.S. Army. He received brevets to colonel in 1824, to brigadier general in 1832, and to major general in 1848. He died in 1852 and is buried in the Congressional Cemetery.

== Sources ==
- Jones, Lewis Hampton (1891). Captain Roger Jones, of London and Virginia: Some of his Antecedents and Descendants. New York City: Joel Munsell's Sons. pp. 72–73.

Military offices
Preceded by Charles J. Nourse (acting)	Adjutant General of the U. S. Army; March 7, 1825-July 15, 1852	Succeeded by Samuel Cooper
