= William Gadsden =

South African cricketer

Personal information
- Full name: William Bell Gadsden
- Born: 20 June 1910; Durban, Natal, South Africa
- Died: 18 March 1995 (aged 84); Durban, South Africa
- Batting: Right-handed
- Bowling: Right-arm medium-pace

Domestic team information
- Years: Team
- 1928–29 to 1930–31: Natal

Career statistics
Competition	First-class
Matches	9
Runs scored	87
Batting average	12.42
100s/50s	0/0
Top score	18
Balls bowled	1964
Wickets	35
Bowling average	16.82
5 wickets in innings	1
10 wickets in match	1
Best bowling	8/64
Catches/stumpings	7/–
- Source: Cricinfo, 20 December 2018

William Bell Gadsden (29 June 1910 – 18 March 1995) was a South African cricketer who played first-class cricket for Natal from 1928 to 1931.

Gadsden, a medium-pace bowler, took 8 for 64 for Natal against Transvaal on his first-class debut as an 18-year-old in 1928–29, twice taking two wickets with consecutive deliveries. He took 10 wickets in the match, for figures of 62.4–18–110–10. In his next match, which followed immediately, he had match figures of 44–23–47–7 against Border. He was selected for the tour of England in 1929 but did not go, apparently because his father said he was too young.

Gadsden was the leading wicket-taker for Natal in 1929–30, when they came second in the Currie Cup, with 14 wickets at an average of 23.50. But after one more match in 1930–31 he disappeared from first-class cricket at the age of 20.
