= Gadsden High School =

Gadsden High School, or variants thereof, may refer to:

- East Gadsden High School, former name of Gadsden County High School (below)
- Gadsden City High School, Gadsden, Alabama
- Gadsden County High School, Gadsden County, Florida
- Gadsden High School (Alabama), Gadsden, Alabama (defunct)
- Gadsden High School (New Mexico), in unincorporated Doña Ana County, New Mexico
- West Gadsden High School, adjacent to the city of Greensboro in Gadsden County, Florida

== See also ==
- Gadsden City Schools, in Etowah County, Alabama
- Gadsden County School District, headquartered in Quincy, Florida
- Gadsden Elementary School District, in Yuma County, Arizona
- Gadsden Independent Schools, headquartered in Sunland Park, New Mexico
