= Ernie Gadsden =

English footballer (1895–1966)

Personal information
- Full name: Ernest Gadsden
- Date of birth: 22 December 1895
- Place of birth: Bulwell, England
- Date of death: 1966 (aged 70–71)
- Position: Full-back

Senior career*
Years	Team	Apps	(Gls)
1914–1920	Bulwell St Alban's		
1920–1921	Norwich City	19	(0)
1921–1922	Shildon Athletic		
1922–1923	Portsmouth	0	(0)
1923–1925	Blackpool	7	(0)
1925–1928	Halifax Town	82	(0)
Total		108	(0)
- * Club domestic league appearances and goals

Ernest Gadsden (22 December 1895 – 1966) was an English footballer who played in the Football League for Blackpool, Halifax Town and Norwich City.
