= Roger Jones (inspector general) =

United States Army general (1831–1889)

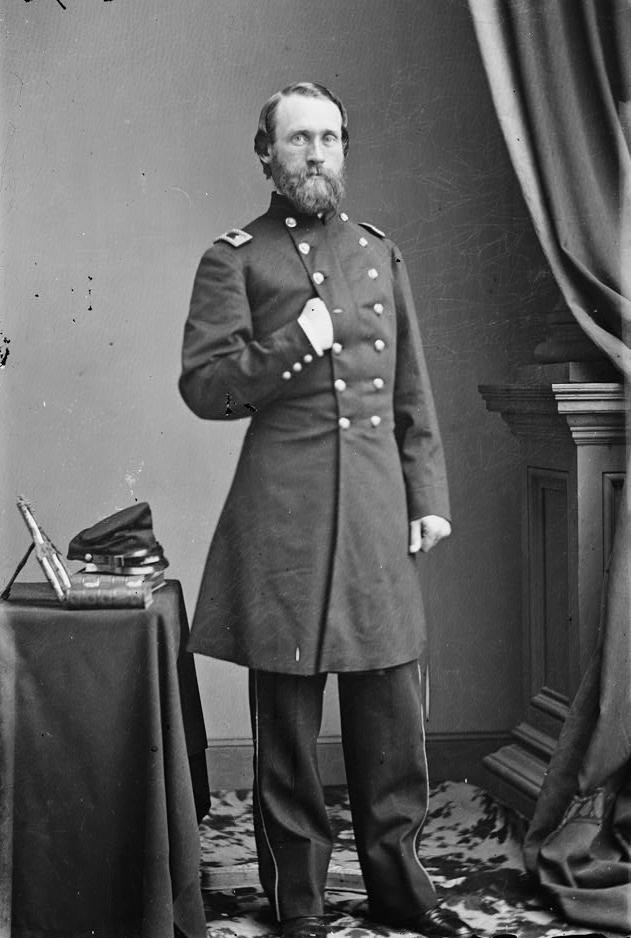
- Roger Jones
- Born: February 25, 1831; Washington, D.C., US
- Died: January 26, 1889 (aged 57); Fort Monroe, Virginia, US
- Burial place: Arlington National Cemetery
- Relatives: Roger Jones (father); Innis N. Palmer (father-in-law)
- Military career
- Allegiance: United States of America; Union
- Branch: US Army; Union Army
- Service years: 1851–1889
- Rank: Brigadier General
- Commands: Inspector General of the U.S. Army
- Conflicts: American Indian Wars; Gila Expedition; American Civil War; Burning of Harpers Ferry

Roger Jones (February 25, 1831 – January 26, 1889) served as Inspector General of the U.S. Army from 1888 to 1889. His father by the same name served as Adjutant General of the U.S. Army from 1825 to 1852.

== Military career ==
Jones, a cousin of Robert E. Lee, graduated from the United States Military Academy in 1851 and was commissioned a second lieutenant in the cavalry, serving in New Mexico, where he participated in the Gila Expedition. In 1861 while serving on recruiting duty at Carlisle Barracks, Pennsylvania, he was ordered to take a detachment of recruits to Harpers Ferry, Virginia to protect the arsenal there from being taken by approaching Virginia militiamen. Unable to defend against an overwhelming force, he ordered the weapons and stores be destroyed, and retreated into Pennsylvania.

== Later life and death ==
Jones spent the remainder of his career in various recruiting, quartermaster and inspector general roles, becoming Inspector General of the U. S. Army in 1888. He died the next year and is buried in Arlington National Cemetery.

== See also ==
- Henry A. Wise

== Notes ==
Military offices
Preceded by Absalom Baird	Inspector General of the U. S. Army; August 20, 1888-January 26, 1889	Succeeded by Joseph C. Breckinridge
