= Beneventum Plantation House =

Historic house in South Carolina, United States

- U.S. National Register of Historic Places
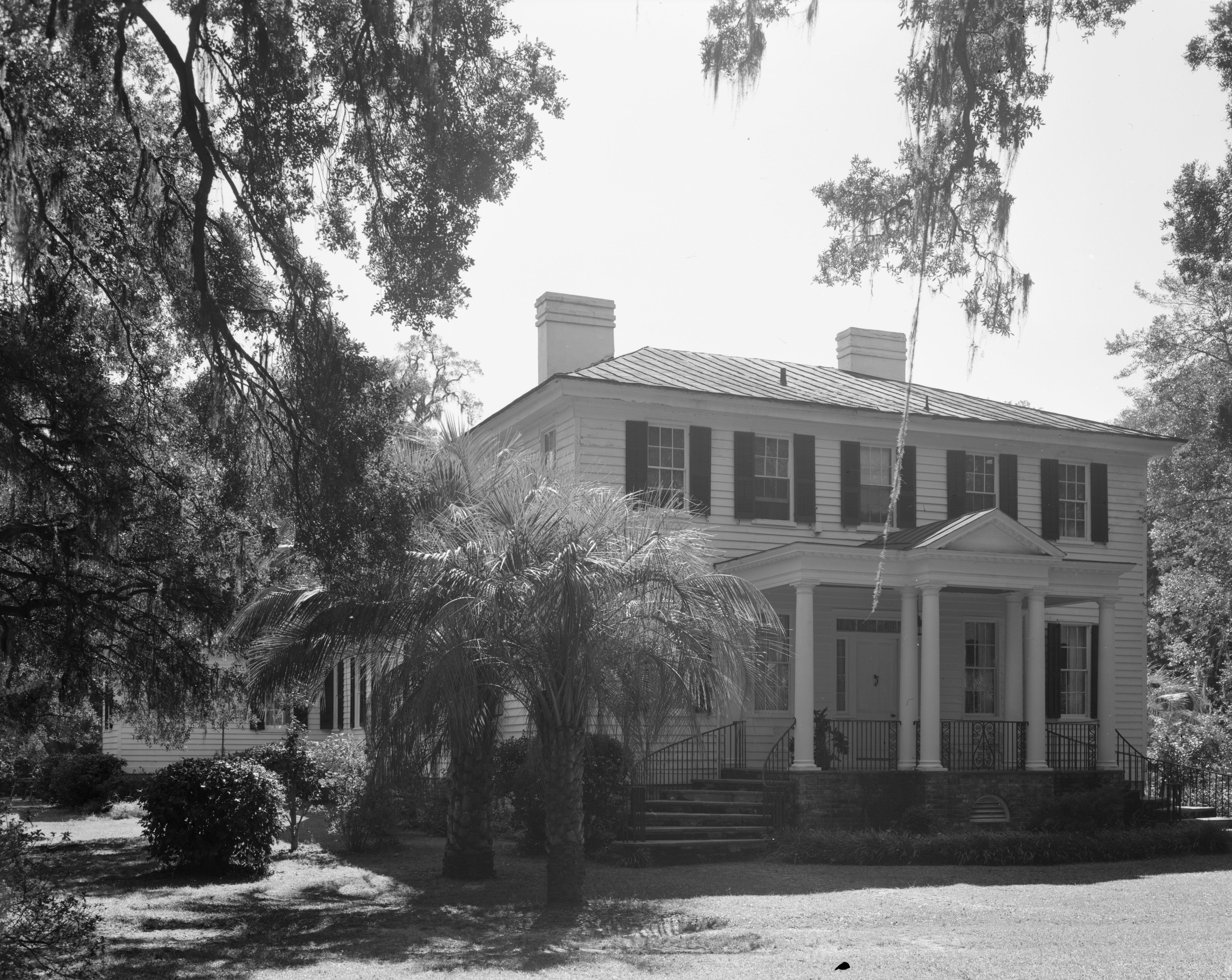
- Beneventum Plantation House, HABS Photo, October 1977

- Location within South Carolina Location within the United States
- Location: Off County Road 431, near Georgetown, South Carolina
- Coordinates: 33°26′43″N 79°15′39″W
- Area: less than one acre
- Built: c. 1750
- Architectural style: Colonial, Southern Colonial
- MPS: Georgetown County Rice Culture MPS
- NRHP reference No.: 88000526
- Added to NRHP: October 3, 1988

Beneventum Plantation House, originally known as Prospect Hill Plantation, is a historic plantation house located near Georgetown, Georgetown County, South Carolina. It was built about 1750, and is a two-story, five-bay, Georgian style house. It features a one-story portico across the center two-thirds of the façade. The rear half of the house was added about 1800, with further rear additions made probably early-20th century. It was the home of Christopher Gadsden, a prominent statesmen and soldier of the American Revolution, the originator of the “Don’t Tread on Me” flag, and Federalist Party leader in the early national period.

It was listed on the National Register of Historic Places in 1988. It is now a private residence with no visitation. There is a state historical marker on the public right of way on Beneventum Road.
