= Charles Fraser (artist) =

American artist

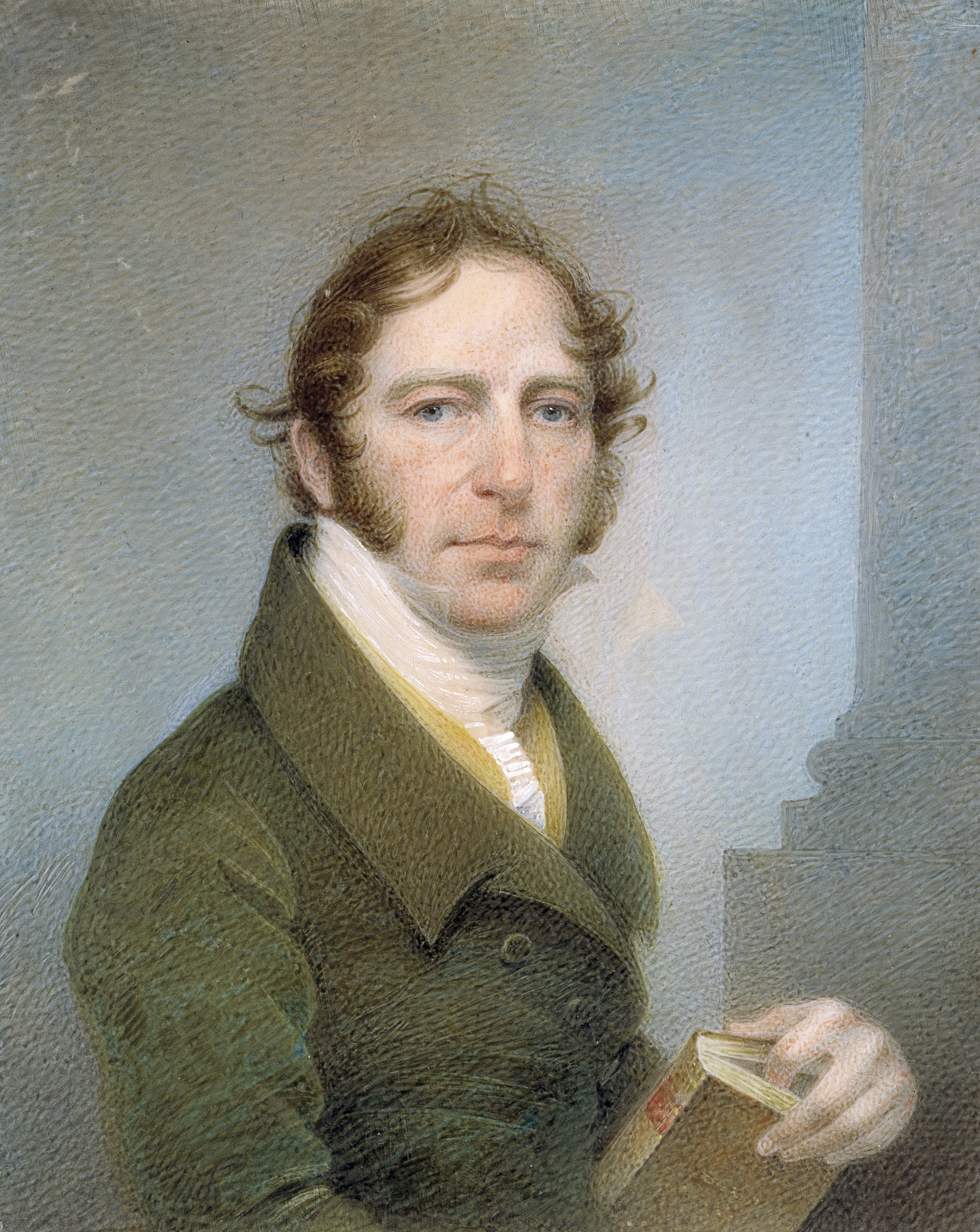
- Self-Portrait, 1832
- Born: August 20, 1782; Charleston, South Carolina, U.S.
- Died: October 5, 1860 (aged 78); Charleston, South Carolina, U.S.
- Occupations: Lawyer, painter

Charles Fraser (August 20, 1782 – October 5, 1860) was an American artist who specialized in portrait painting.

== Early life ==
Charles Fraser was born at Charleston, South Carolina in 1782. His parents died when he was nine years old and thereafter, he was raised by his older brother, Frederick Fraser. He studied law and practiced until 1818, but afterwards devoted himself to art. He attended the classical academy of Bishop Robert Smith in Charleston along with Thomas Sully.

== Career ==
At various points in his career, he was associated with Washington Allston and John Stevens Cogdell. In 1806, he visited Newport, Rhode Island where he met up with John Trumbull and Gilbert Stuart.

In 1825, he painted a portrait of Marquis de Lafayette. His talent was very diversified, and in 1857, at an exhibition of his works at Charleston, there were shown 313 miniatures and 139 landscapes and other pieces by him. He was also a frequent orator in Charleston. For instance, he delivered the dedication address at Magnolia Cemetery in 1850. He also delivered an address on the dedication of a new building on the College of Charleston campus in 1828.

In 1830, he was elected into the National Academy of Design as an Honorary Academician, and elected a member of the American Antiquarian Society in 1834.

Fraser died at Charleston in 1860.

== Gallery ==
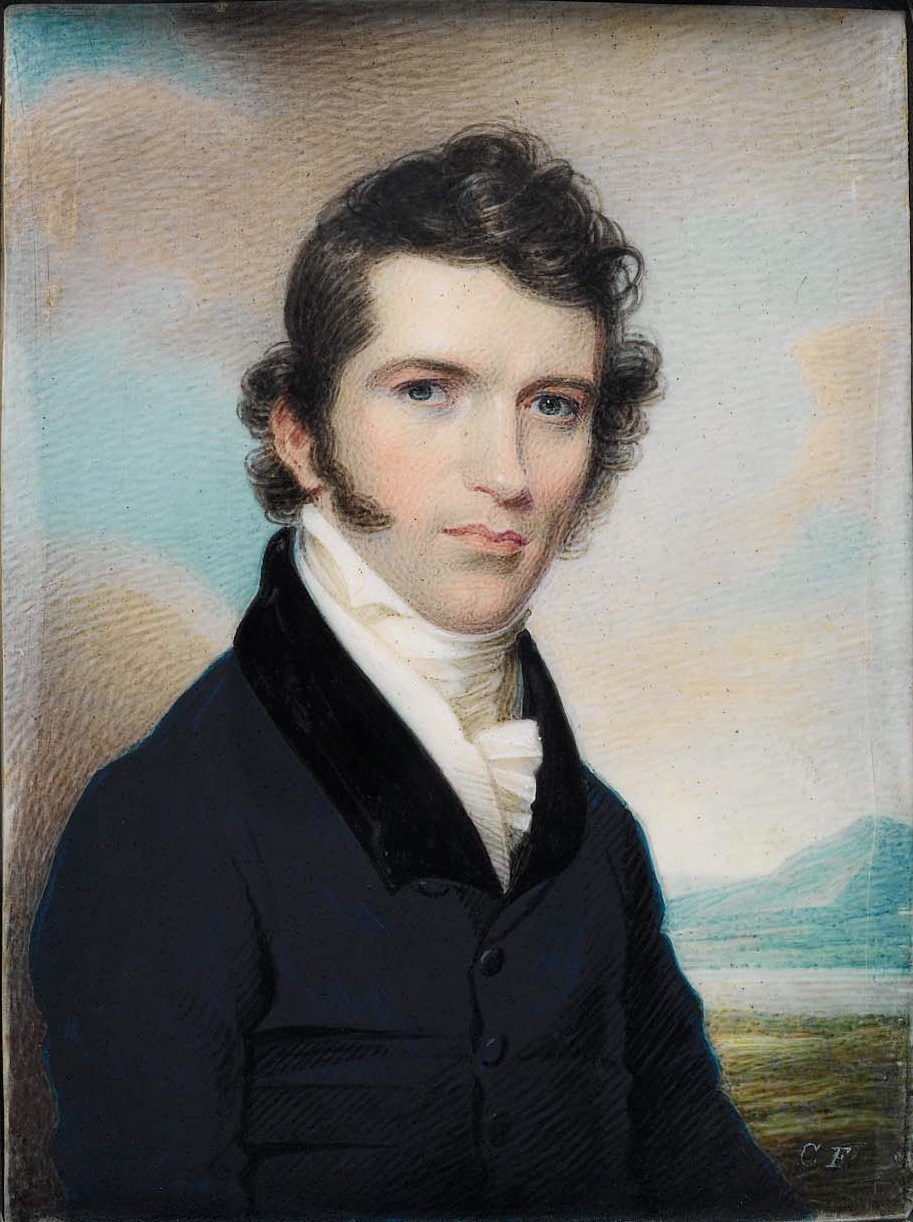
Portrait of Alvan Fisher, by Fraser, 1819ca, now in the MFA Boston

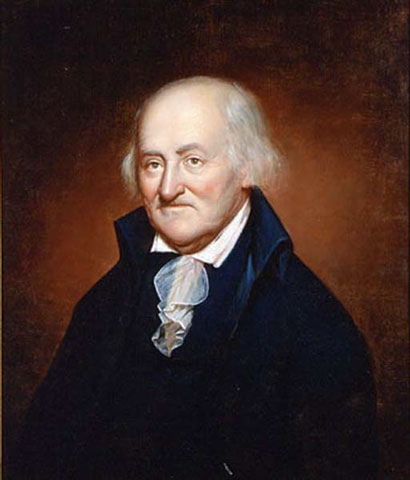
Portrait of Christopher Gadsden, by Fraser, 1819, now in the Gibbes Museum of Art

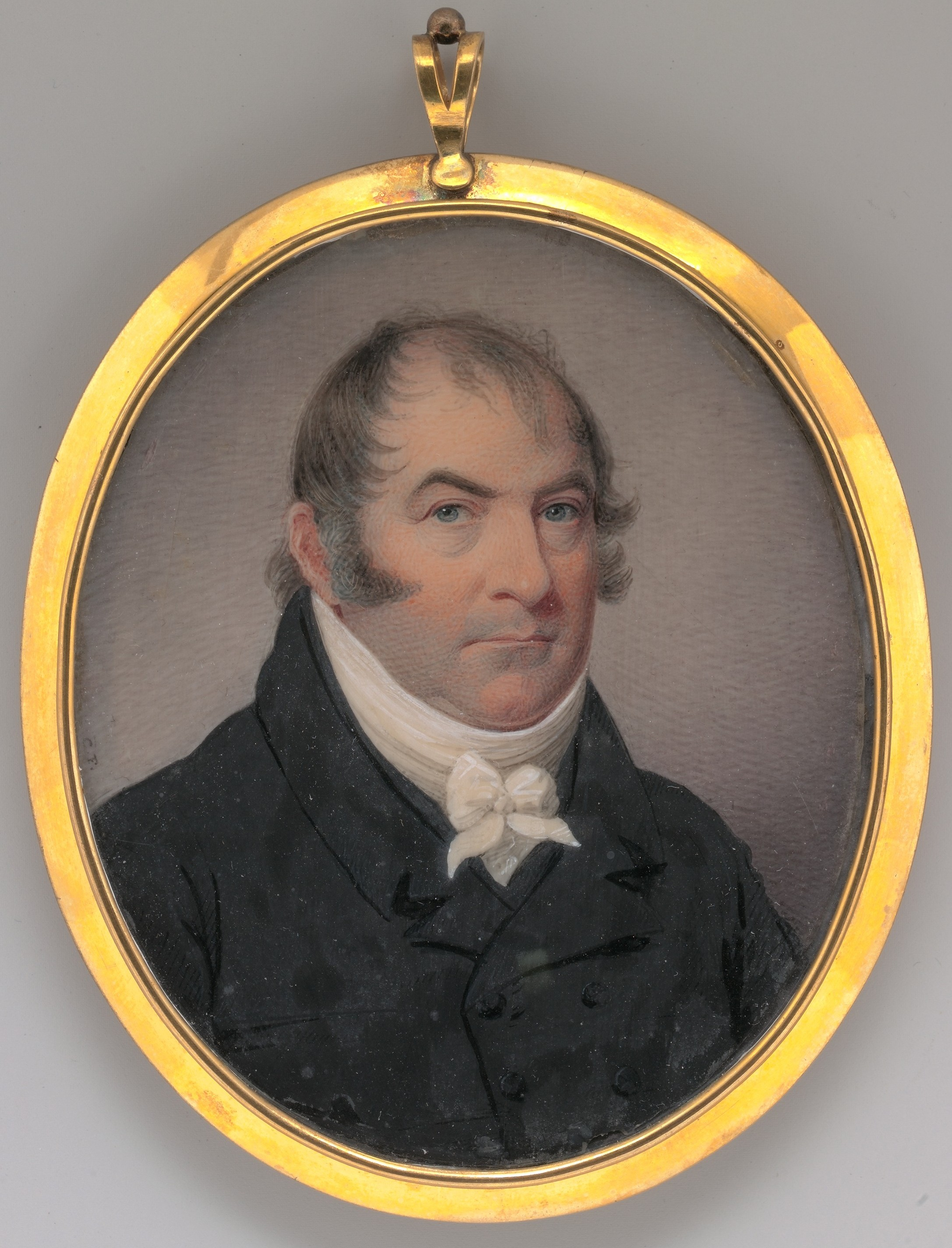
Portrait of Colonel James Elliott McPherson by Fraser, 1819, now in the Metropolitan Museum of Art

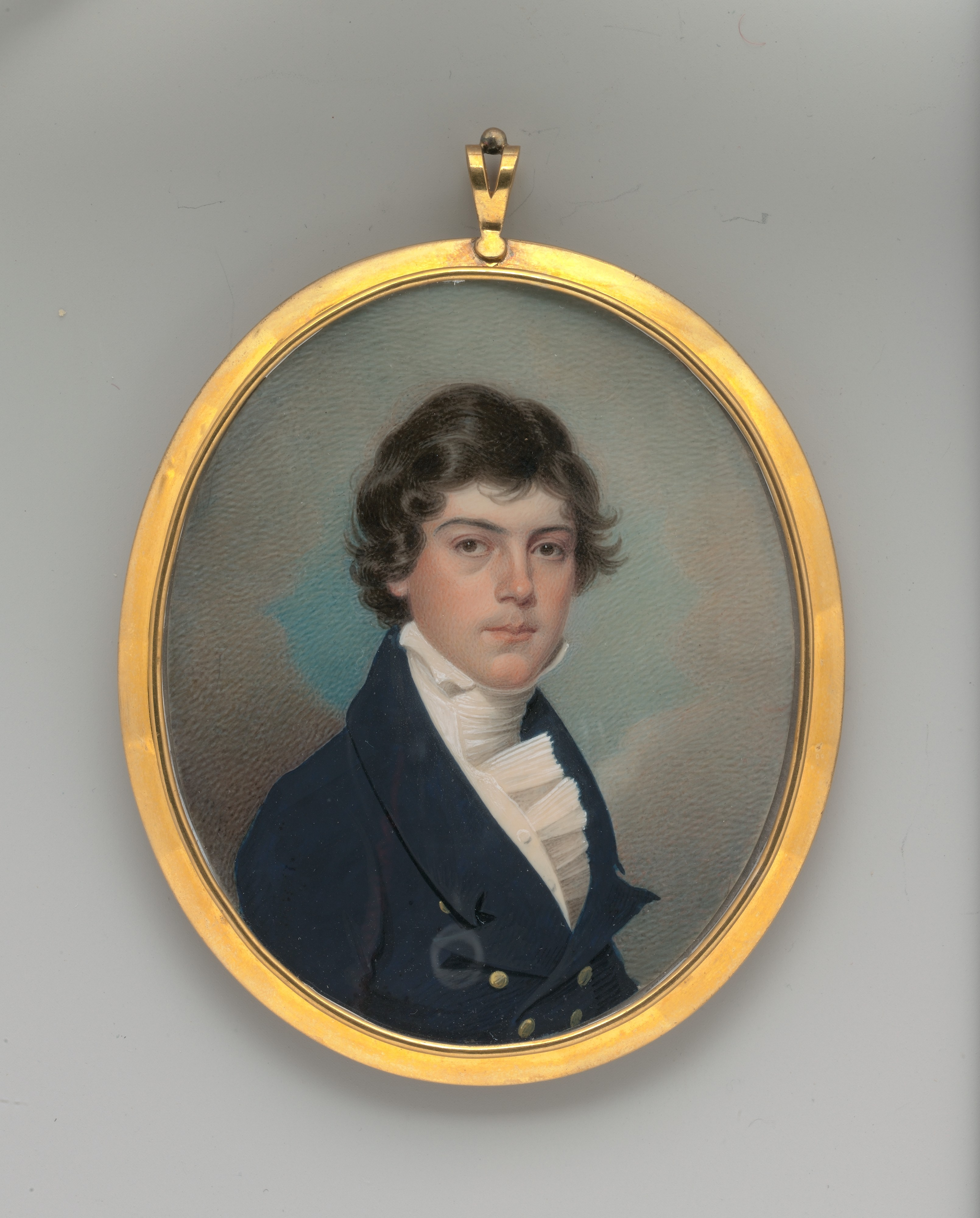
Portrait of Isaac O'Brien L. McPherson by Fraser, 1823, now in the Metropolitan Museum of Art

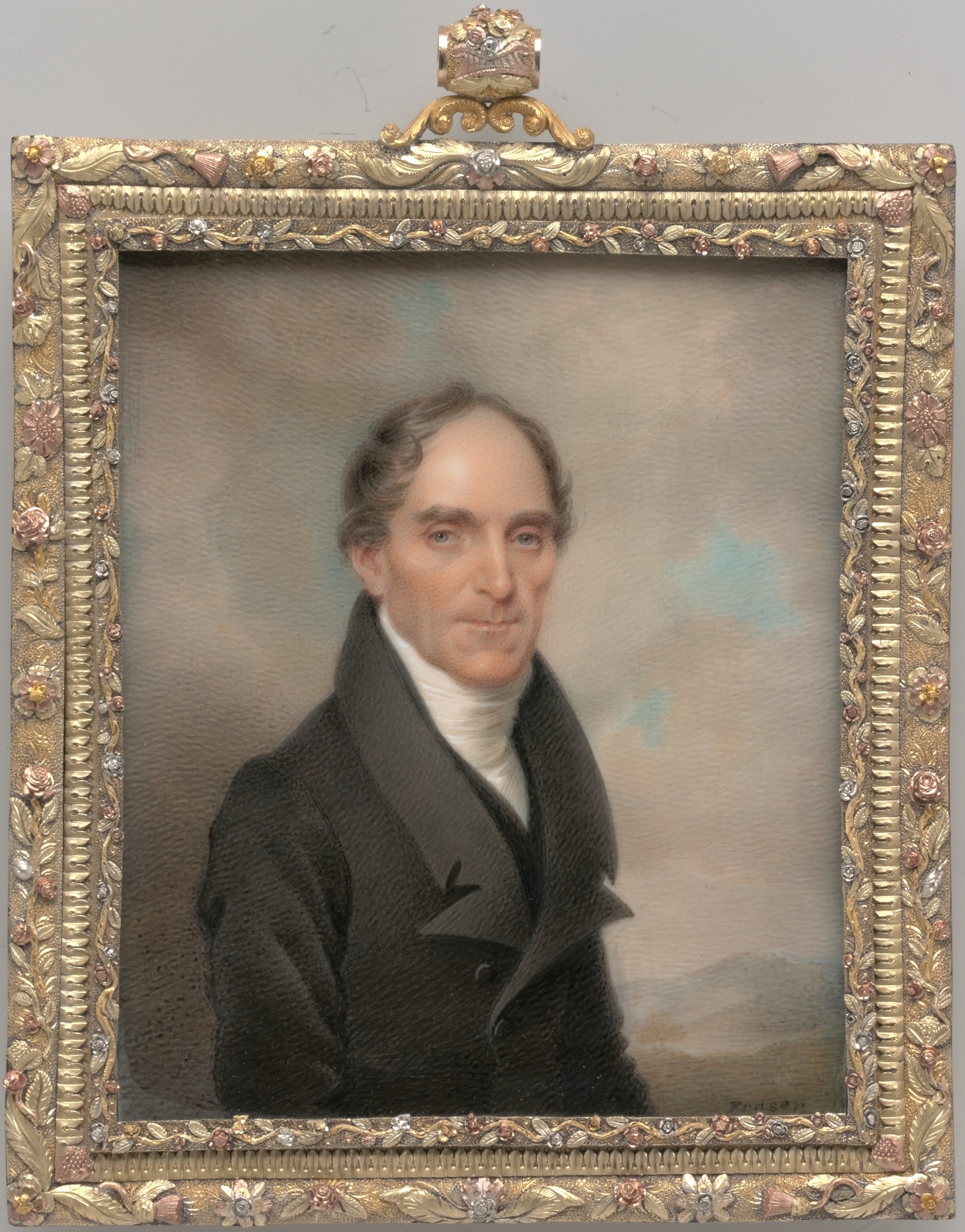
Portrait of Dr. Francis Kinloch Huger by Fraser, 1825, now in the Metropolitan Museum of Art

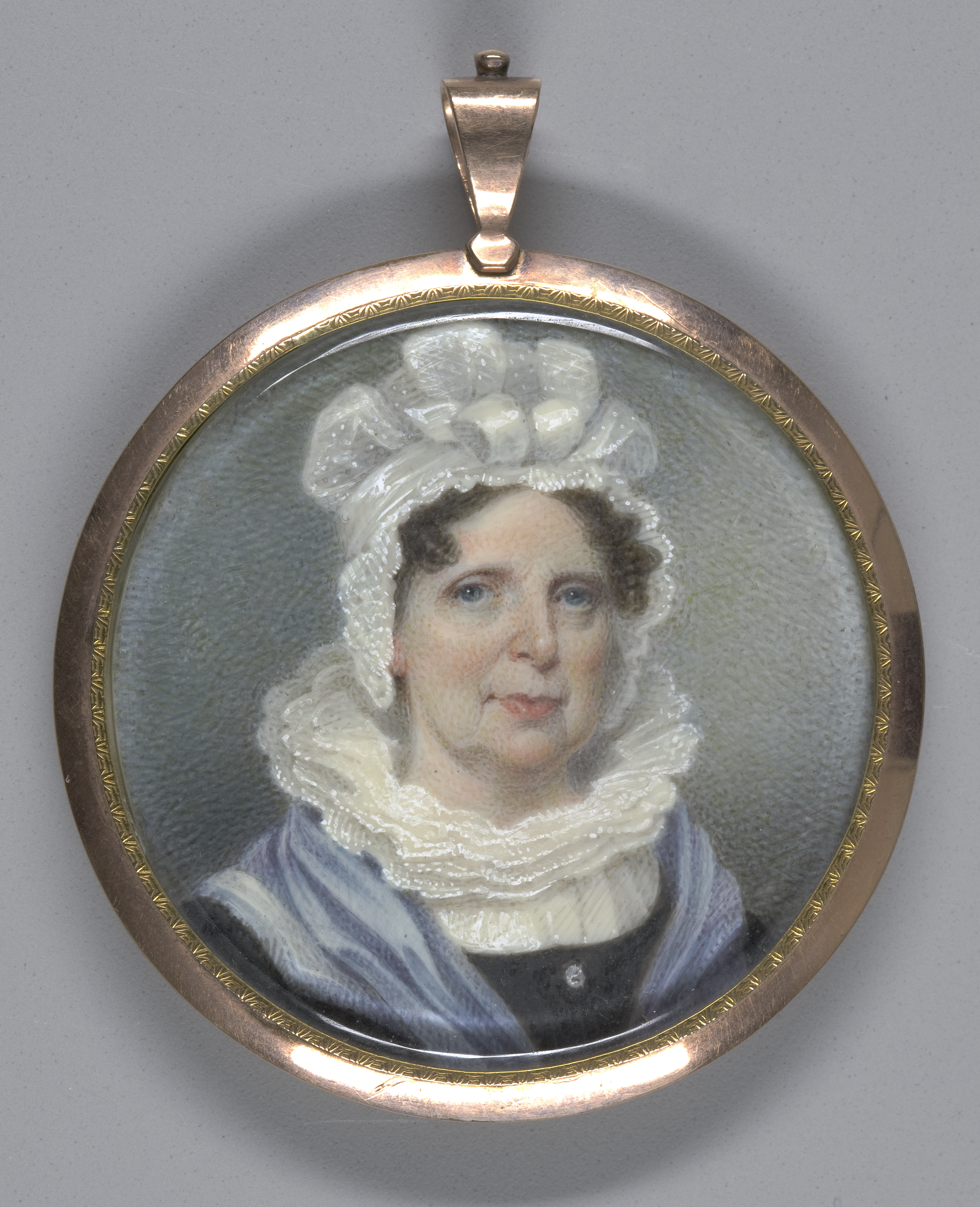
Portrait of Mrs. Theodore Gourdin (Elizabeth Gaillard), 1826, now in the Yale University Art Gallery

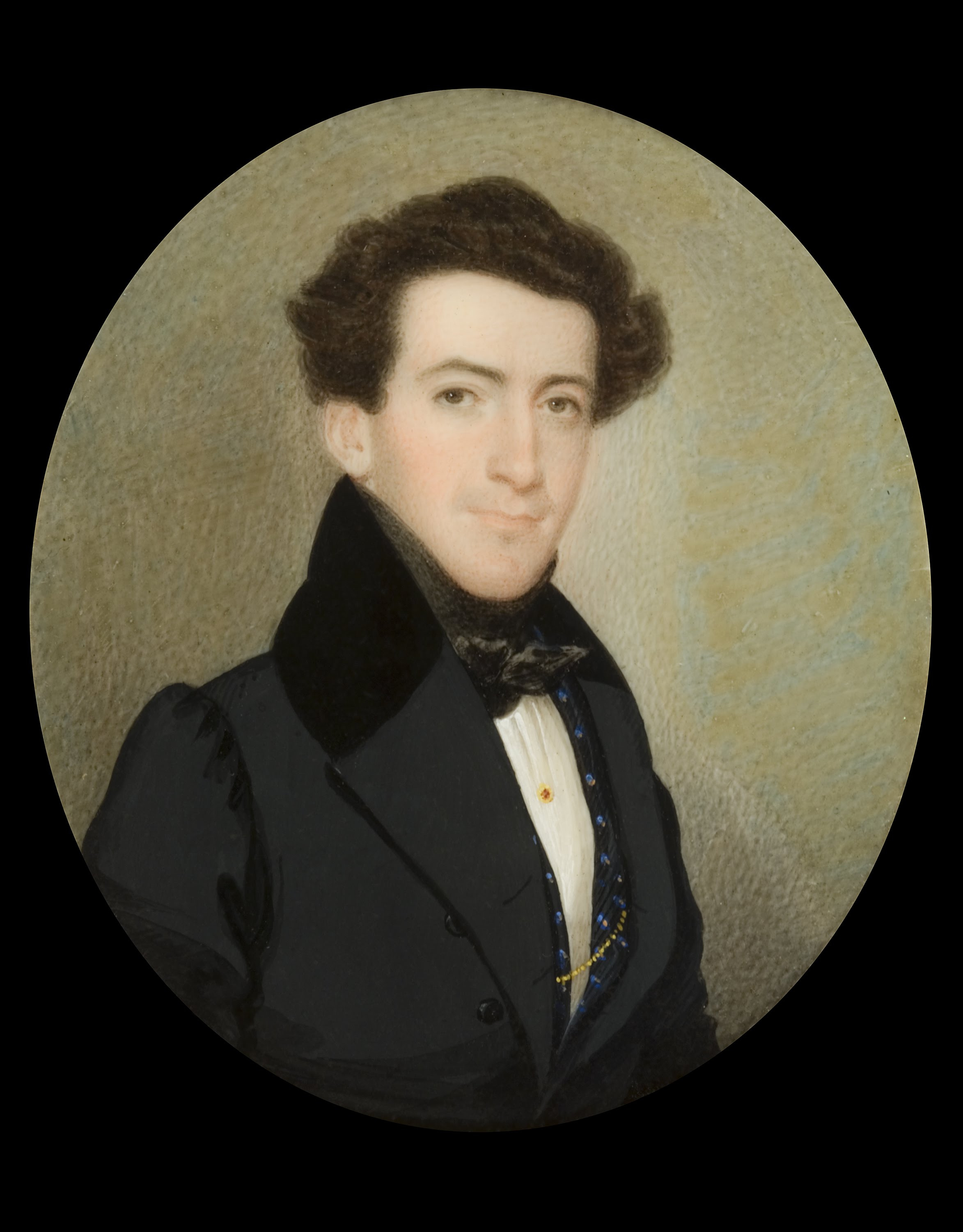
Portrait of John McPherson Pringle by Fraser, 1834, now in the Gibbes Museum of Art
