= Christopher Gadsden =

American Revolutionary War politician (1724–1805)

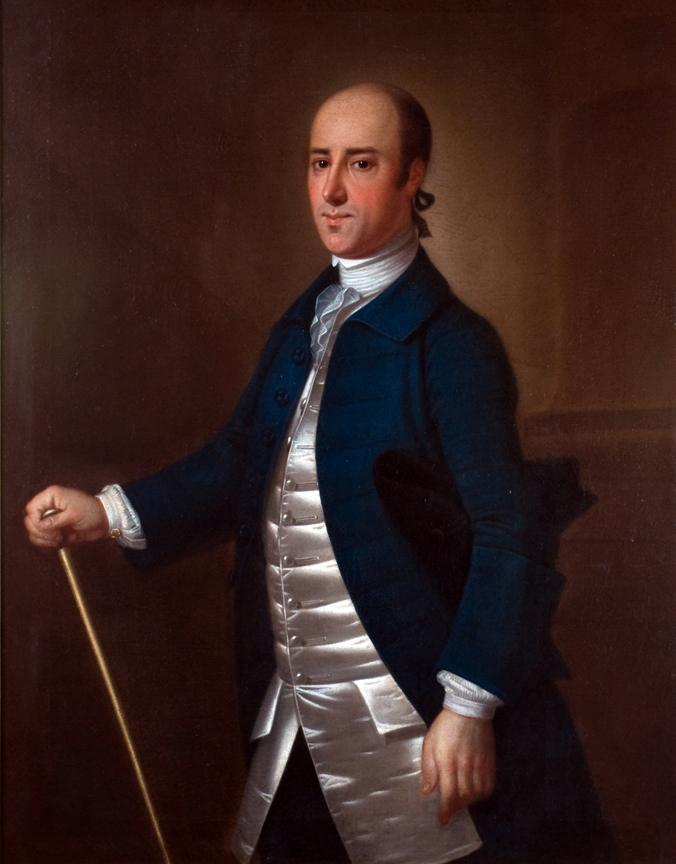
- Portrait by Jeremiah Theus, c. 1760-1770

7th Lieutenant Governor of South Carolina
- In office January 24, 1780 – January 31, 1782
- Governor: John Rutledge
- Preceded by: Thomas Bee
- Succeeded by: Richard Hutson

Personal details
- Born: February 16, 1724 Charleston, South Carolina, British America
- Died: August 28, 1805 (aged 81) Charleston, South Carolina, U.S.
- Relatives: Christopher Edwards Gadsden (grandson); James Gadsden (grandson); John Gadsden (grandson)
- Military Service
- Allegiance: Kingdom of Great Britain; United States
- Branch: South Carolina Militia; Continental Army
- Service years: 1759 (colonial); 1776–1777 (US)
- Rank: Captain (colonial); Brigadier General
- Commands: South Carolina 1st Regiment (Infantry)
- Conflicts: French and Indian War; American Revolutionary War

Christopher Gadsden (February 16, 1724 – August 28, 1805) was an American politician who was the principal leader of the South Carolina Patriot movement during the American Revolution. He was a delegate to the Continental Congress, a brigadier general in the Continental Army during the American Revolutionary War, the seventh lieutenant governor of South Carolina, a merchant and slaver and the designer of the Gadsden flag. He is a signatory to the Continental Association.

== Early life ==
Gadsden was born in 1724 in Charleston, South Carolina. He was the son of Thomas Gadsden, who had been in the Royal Navy before becoming customs collector for the Port of Charleston. His grandfather, Edward Gadsden, was born in Wiltshire, England, in 1672 and emigrated to South Carolina in 1695. He was sent to school near Bristol, England. He returned to America in 1740 and served as an apprentice at a counting house in Philadelphia, Pennsylvania. He inherited a large fortune from his father who died in 1741. From 1745 to 1746 he served as a purser in the Royal Navy during King George's War. He entered into mercantile ventures and by 1747 had earned enough to return to South Carolina and buy back the land his father had sold because he needed the money to pay off debts. He built Beneventum Plantation House in about 1750.

=== Views on slavery ===
Gadsden was a slave owner. He did support John Adams, who was opposed to slavery and promoted a gradual approach to abolition. The U.S. National Park Service writes that "by 1774, Christopher Gadsden owned four stores, several merchant vessels, two rice plantations, a residential district in Charleston called Gadsdenboro, and a large wharf on the Cooper River." Of all the colonies, South Carolina received the highest number of slaves from Africa, and most of these came ashore on Gadsden's Wharf in Charleston. Gadsden, along with many other rice plantation owners in South Carolina, forced enslaved Africans to work his fields so he could grow and sell agricultural products. In A Forgotten Founder: The Life and Legacy of Christopher Gadsden, Kelcey Eldridge states that, "at the time of his death, he owned enough slaves to 'divide my Estate real and personal as well as my negroes as otherwise into nineteen equal parts or shares'"; it is unknown just how many enslaved people he purchased, owned, or used.

=== Seven Years' War ===
Gadsden began his rise to prominence as a merchant and patriot in Charleston. He prospered as a merchant and built the wharf that bears his name. Between its completion in 1767 until 1787 and 1803 to 1808, it is estimated that 40% of all African slaves (about 100,000 enslaved people) were brought to America through his wharf. He was captain of a militia company during a 1759 expedition against the Cherokee. He was first elected to the Commons House of Assembly in 1757 and began a long friction with autocratic royal governors. His re-election to the Commons in 1762 was beset with minor voting irregularities, which resulted in Governor Boone refusing to administer the oath of office for Gadsden and dissolving the entire Commons. This perceived excess of gubernatorial power led to a political culture in South Carolina of legislative dominance over the executive branch.

In 1766, the assembly made him one of their delegates to the Stamp Act Congress in New York City, which was called to protest the Stamp Act. While his fellow delegates Thomas Lynch and John Rutledge served on committees to draft appeals to the House of Lords and Commons respectively, Gadsden refused any such assignment, since in his view the British parliament had no rights in the matter. He was outspoken in his support of the Declaration of Rights and Grievances produced by the Congress. His addresses brought him to the attention of Samuel Adams of Massachusetts, and the two began a long correspondence and friendship. Gadsden was eventually known as "the Sam Adams of the South".

== Revolutionary years ==
On his return from New York, Gadsden became one of the founders and leaders of the Charleston Sons of Liberty. He had risen to the rank of lieutenant colonel in the militia. He was elected as a delegate to the First Continental Congress in 1774 and the Second Continental Congress the following year. He left Congress early in 1776 to assume command of the 1st South Carolina Regiment of the Continental Army and to serve in the Provincial Congress of South Carolina.

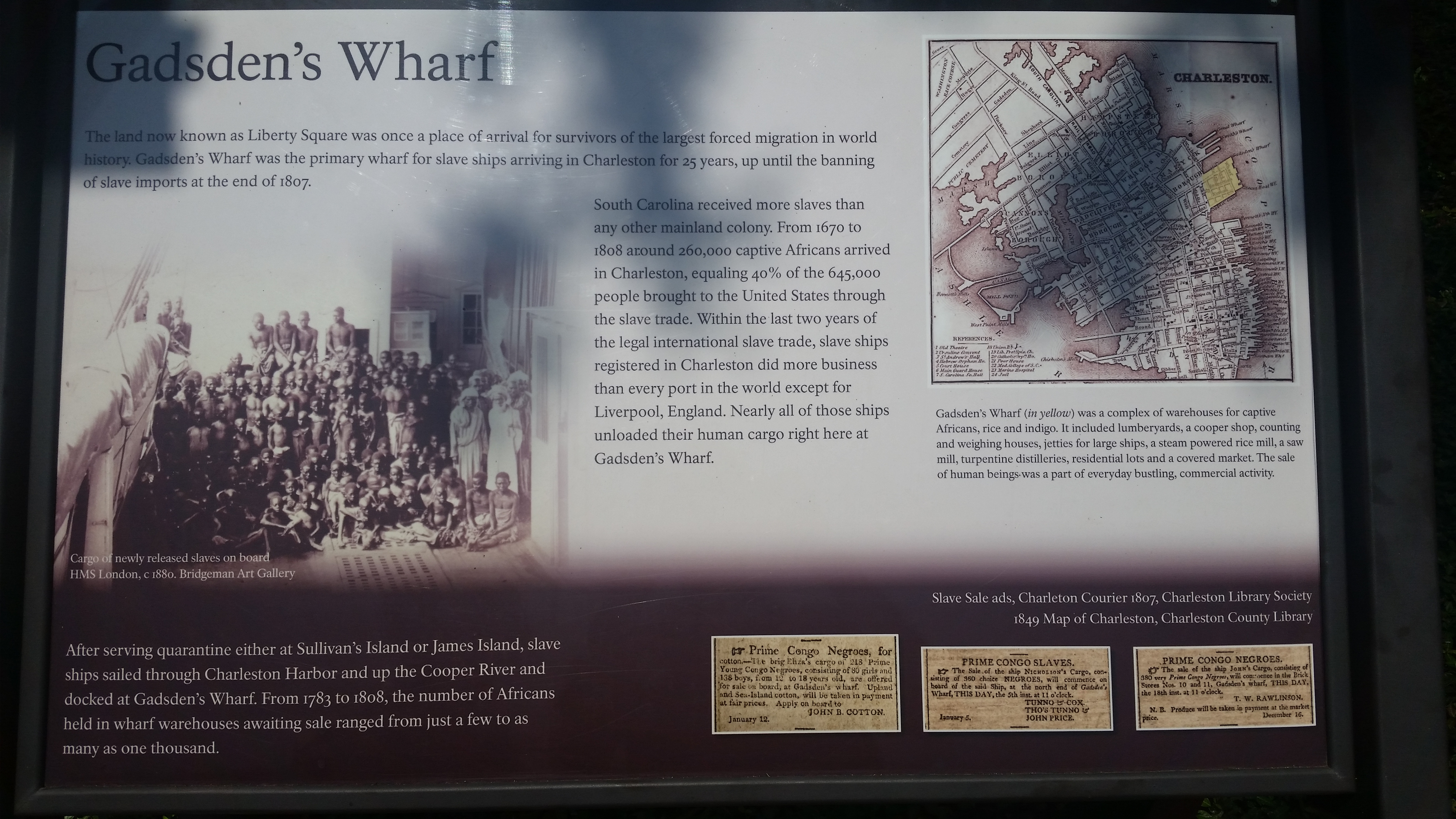
National Park Service marker depicting Gadsden's Wharf

In February 1776, South Carolina President John Rutledge named him a brigadier general in charge of the state's military forces. As the British prepared to attack Charleston, Major General Charles Lee ordered outlying positions abandoned. Rutledge and the local officers disagreed. A compromise was reached and as William Moultrie prepared the defenses on Sullivan's Island, Gadsden paid for, and his regiment built, a bridge that would allow their escape if the position were threatened. The British attack was repulsed at the Battle of Sullivan's Island.

In 1778, Gadsden was a member of the South Carolina convention that drafted a new state constitution. That same year he was named the lieutenant governor, to replace Henry Laurens who was away at the Continental Congress. He served in that office until 1780. For the first year and a half, his office was called "Vice President of South Carolina," but when the new constitution was adopted, the title was changed to the modern usage.

Gadsden flag

When British forces laid siege to Charleston in 1780, Rutledge fled to North Carolina to ensure a "government in exile" in the event the city surrendered. Gadsden remained in Charleston, along with Governor Rawlins Lowndes. General Benjamin Lincoln surrendered the American garrison in the city on May 12 to General Henry Clinton. At the same time, Gadsden, representing the civil government, surrendered the city as well. He was sent on parole to his Charleston house.

=== Prisoner of war ===
Following Clinton's return to New York, his replacement General Charles Cornwallis adopted a different stance towards parole. On August 27, 1780, he ordered the arrest of 20 South Carolinian civilian officials then on parole, who were sent by ship to St. Augustine, Florida. When they arrived, Governor Patrick Tonyn offered them the freedom of the town if they would give their parole. All of the prisoners except Gadsden accepted, resulting in him spending the next 42 weeks in solitary confinement at the Castillo de San Marcos. The prisoners, including Gadsden, were released in 1781 and sent via a merchantmen to Philadelphia. Once they arrived, Gadsden learned of the American victory at the Battle of Cowpens and Cornwallis' subsequent march to Yorktown, Virginia, and quickly returned to South Carolina to restore the state's civil government.

== Later life ==
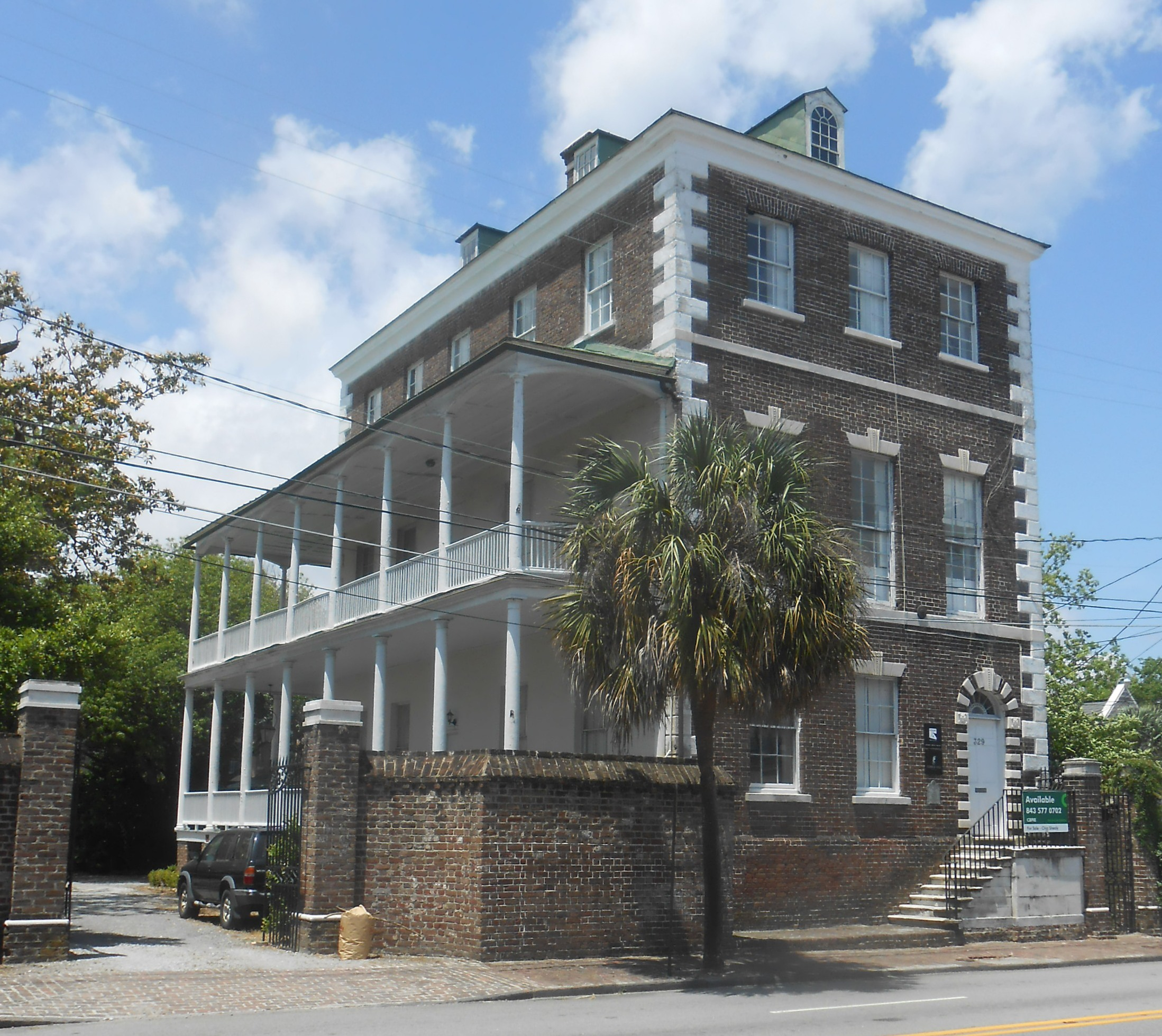
Christopher Gadsden built the three-story house at 329 East Bay Street.

Gadsden was returned to South Carolina's House of Representatives, then meeting at Jacksonboro. At this session, Governor Randolph and de facto President Rutledge both surrendered their offices. Gadsden was elected as the governor but felt he had to decline. His health was still impaired from his imprisonment, and an active governor was needed since the British had not yet given up Charleston. So in 1782, John Mathews became the new governor. Gadsden was also a member of the state convention in 1788 and voted for ratification of the United States Constitution.

In 1798, he built the imposing house at 329 East Bay Street in the Ansonborough area of Charleston that remained in the family for more than a century; famous ironworker Philip Simmons built the gates that incorporate a snake motif, drawn from the "Don't Tread on Me" flag that Gadsden designed.

Gadsden was married three times and had four children with his second wife. Three of his grandsons, all brothers, were also notable:

- Christopher Edwards Gadsden, who served as the fourth Episcopal Bishop of South Carolina
- James Gadsden, for whom the Gadsden Purchase of Arizona was named
- John Gadsden, who served two terms as the Mayor of Charleston

Gadsden died from an accidental fall on August 28, 1805, in Charleston, and is buried there in St. Philip's Churchyard.

== Legacy ==
The Gadsden flag has come to symbolize individualism, the American Revolution, and liberty.

Battery Gadsden, an extension of Fort Moultrie on Sullivan's Island, is named after him.

Political offices
Preceded by Thomas Bee	Lieutenant Governor of South Carolina; 1780–1782	Succeeded by Richard Hutson
