= Samota =

Samota is a surname. Notable people with the surname include:

- Angela Samota (1964–1984), American murder victim
- Paramjeet Samota (born 1988), Indian boxer
