= Cornelius T. Herring =

American rancher, banker and hotelier

Cornelius Taylor Herring
- Born: November 13, 1849; Grayson County, Texas, U.S.
- Died: June 29, 1931 (aged 81); Amarillo, Texas, U.S.
- Resting place: Llano Cemetery, Amarillo, Texas, U.S.
- Occupations: Rancher, banker
- Spouses: Sarah Jane Lawrence; Elizabeth Smithey
- Children: 1 son, 1 daughter
- Parent(s): Jesse Herring; Sarah Friend

Colonel Cornelius Taylor Herring (November 13, 1849 – June 29, 1931) was an American rancher, banker and hotelier. He was the owner of up to five ranches in Texas. He was the founder of the Herring Bank. He built hotels in Vernon and Amarillo, Texas. He served as the first chairman of the West Texas Chamber of Commerce.

== Early life ==
Cornelius Taylor Herring was born on November 13, 1849, in Sherman County, Texas. His father was Jesse Herring and his mother, Sarah Friend. His mother died when he was ten years old. Meanwhile, his father remarried and served in the Confederate States Army during the American Civil War. He had a brother, Emerson.

== Career ==
Herring started his career as a wheat farmer in Hill County, Texas, at the age of thirteen, making $200 the first year. By the second year, he purchased 100 head of cattle. At the close of the civil war, Cornelius and his brother Emerson drove cattle from Navarro County, Texas, to Shreveport, Louisiana. By 1872, they purchased 500 acres in Smith County, Texas.

Herring moved his cattle to Archer County, Texas, in 1878. Within a few years, he moved his cattle to the open range which belonged to the Comanche and Kiowa, two Native American tribes.

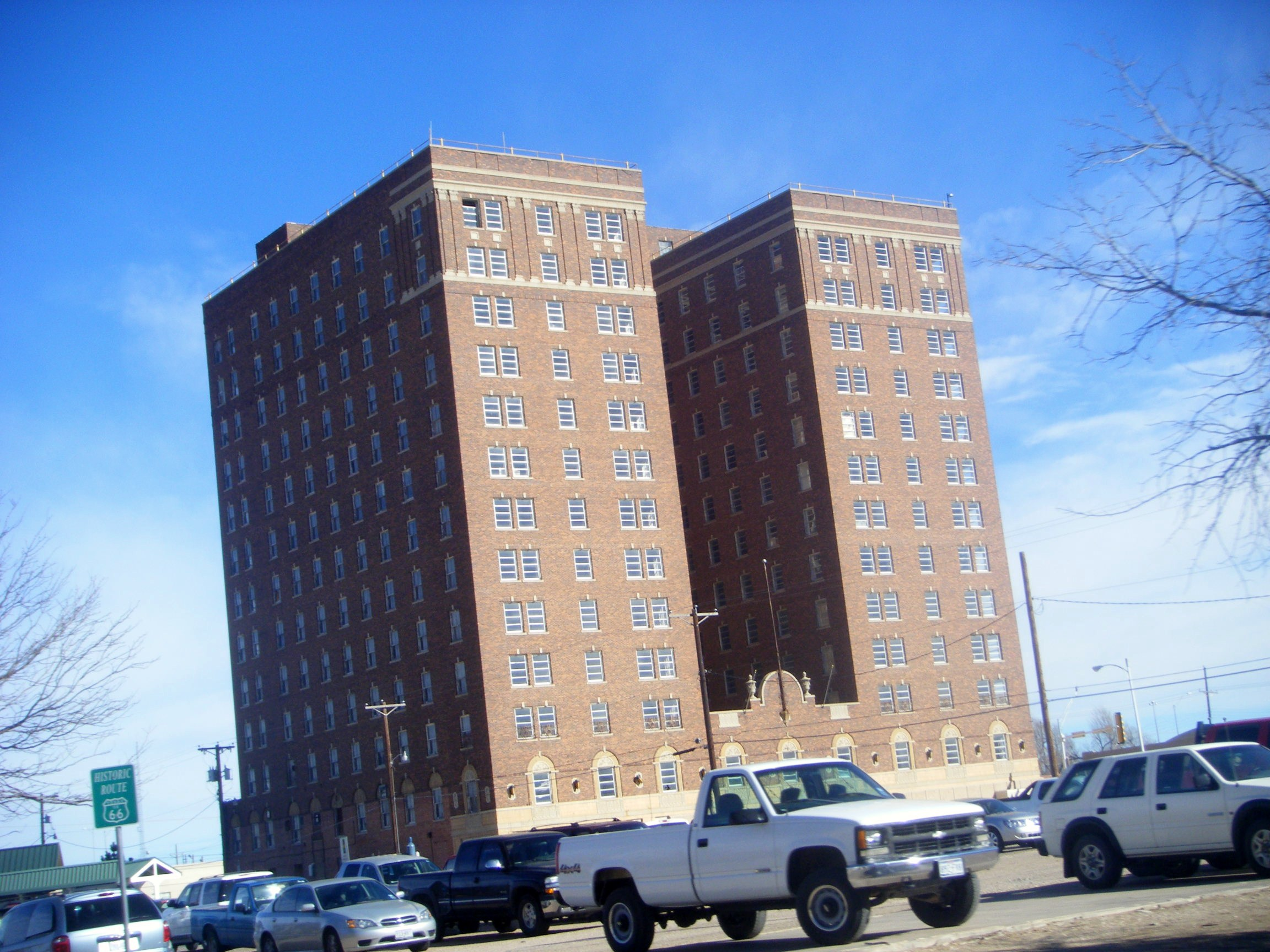
The Herring Hotel in Amarillo, Texas.

Herring sued the Texas and Pacific Railway for "damages to cattle" in 1883.

Herring invested in cattle with Bill Stinson in the late 1880s. By 1887, they owned 12,000 Texas Longhorns, which they raised over 150,000 acres in Greer County, Texas. In 1899, Herring founded the C. T. Herring Banking Company, later known as the Herring National Bank and finally the Herring Bank in Vernon, Texas. It was also in Vernon that he built his first hotel, known as the Wilbarger Hotel. Additionally, he "owned thirteen lumber companies throughout North Texas" like the C. T. Herring Lumber Company in Wichita Falls, Texas. By the late 1890s, he raised cattle in New Mexico, Oklahoma, and Lyon County, Kansas.

Herring purchased the Seven-Up Ranch in Castro County, Texas, in 1905. Two years later, in 1907, he purchased 96,000 acres from the LS Ranch in Oldham County, Texas. He also purchased the Kit Carson Ranch, the "Y Ranch near Paducah, the H-Anchor Ranch near Crowell, a ranch in the Big Bend country, and farming interests in Hartley and Moore counties." With Patrick H. Landergin, he acquired the Bravo Ranch, formerly owned by Henry B. Sanborn.

Herring joined the Texas and Southwestern Cattle Raisers Association. He served on the executive committee of the Panhandle and Southwestern Stockmen's Association in 1912. By 1919, he served as the first chairman of the West Texas Chamber of Commerce. He also served as the president of the Tri-State Fair Association.

Herring built the Palo Duro, a five-story hotel in Amarillo, in 1923. He built the Herring Hotel, a 14-story hotel, for US$1 million, in 1925. Additionally, he was a shareholder of the Amarillo Gas Company, later known as Pioneer Natural Gas.

Herring was a member of the Benevolent and Protective Order of Elks, the Rotary Club, the Odd Fellows, and the Boy Scouts of America.

== Personal life ==
Herring married Sarah Jane Lawrence in 1869. They had a son, William E. Herring of Amarillo and a daughter, Mrs L. K. Johnson of Vernon. The couple divorced, and Herring married Elizabeth Smithey in 1889. After living in Vernon, they moved into a new mansion located at 2216 Van Buren Street in Amarillo, Texas in the 1910s.

== Death and legacy ==
Herring died on June 29, 1931, in Amarillo, Texas. He was buried at the Llano Cemetery in Amarillo. By the time of his death, he was worth an estimated US$10 million.

Herring's mansion in Amarillo was demolished in 1970. It is now a parking lot near the Amarillo Museum of Art.
