= General Bridges =

General Bridges may refer to:

- Charles Higbee Bridges (1873–1948), U.S. Army major general
- Roy D. Bridges Jr. (born 1943), U.S. Air Force major general
- Tom Bridges (1871–1939), British Army lieutenant general
- William Bridges (general) (1861–1915), Australian Army major general

== See also ==
- Tobias Bridge (fl. 1650s–1670s), English Civil War general on the side of Parliament
