= Mieczyslaw Pianowski =

Polish-American ballet dancer and teacher

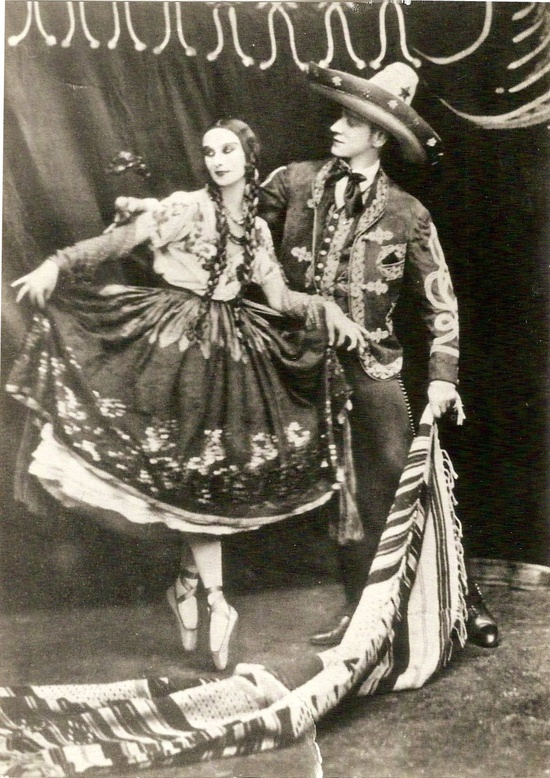
- Mieczyslaw Pianowski with Anna Pavlova 1919
- Born: January 1, 1890; Warsaw, Poland
- Died: March 30, 1967 (aged 77); Amarillo, Texas, U.S.
- Occupations: Dancer, choreographer, ballet director, ballet teacher
- Spouse: Sabina Sniezko-Blocka
- Children: Jorge Pianowski

Mieczyslaw Pianowski was a Polish-American dancer, choreographer, ballet director, and ballet teacher. He was a soloist in Anna Pavlova's company, and he was her ballet master for 13 years.

== Career ==
Pianowski received his early training at the Warsaw Ballet School in Warsaw, Poland. From 1905 to 1915, he performed as a principal dancer with the Warsaw Grand Opera Theater Ballet Company, where he played a central role in the company's performances. In 1915, Pianowski went under contract with Sergei Diaghilev's Ballet Russe and remained with the troupe for about 3 years. Pianowski's wife, Sabina, accompanied him while he toured with the Ballet Russe.

Pianowski met Ana Pavlova in 1918 while touring with the Italian Opera Company in Santiago Chile. It was said that Pavlova was greatly impressed by his talent, leading to his appointment as a soloist and assistant in her company. He later assumed the position of chief ballet master, a role he held until the company disbanded following Pavlova's death in 1931. After Pavlova's death, Pianowski moved to Yugoslavia, and subsequently relocated to Riga, Latvia, where he served as the ballet director and choreographer for the opera and ballet for two years. . He staged six ballets in Latvia, and developed dances for several operas. In 1934, Pianowski returned to Poland, and in 1935, he was appointed ballet master at the Warsaw Grand Opera Theater, as well as director of the Warsaw Ballet School. In 1952, Pianowski established his own ballet studio in Boston. He later relocated to Amarillo, Texas, where he taught at the Musical Arts Conservatory.

== Early life ==
Pianowski was born January 1, 1890, in Warsaw, Poland, to Jan Pianowski and Jozffa Skrzypinska. Pianowski's father, Jan, was a merchant, and owned a delicatessen shop where they lived in an apartment above the shop. He had two siblings, Henry and Helen. He began his ballet training at the age of six, when his father took him to an audition at the Warsaw Grand Opera Theatre ballet company. Despite being a year too young, the ballet master admitted him into the school. Around twelve years later, when Pianowski was ready to graduate, he was required to remain in school for an additional year, as he was still too young to be accepted as a member of the company. A year later, he became a soloist with the Warsaw Grand Opera. To supplement his income while dancing, Pianowski took a job as a teacher at an all-girls school, where he met his wife Sabina. They married after Sabina's graduation in Switzerland where she had begun to study medicine.

== Invasion of Poland ==
In 1939, Sabina resided with the couple’s 16-year-old son, Jorge, at their country home in northern Poland, while Pianowski remained in Warsaw to continue his professional engagements at the opera. Every Saturday after Pianowski's performance, he would return to his wife and son at their country home. That same year, the Germans invaded Poland, the opera house was bombed and Pianowski was taken to a concentration camp in Germany where he was forced to labor in a munitions factory. Because they were in Northern Poland at the time, Pianowski's wife and son didn't know that he had been captured by the Germans, and were unaware of his plight. When the Soviet troops advanced from the North, Pianowski's wife and son were put on a train to Siberia. After a year in Siberia, Jorge was offered the opportunity to leave if he enlisted in the Polish Army and fought alongside the Soviet forces. He accepted the offer and later went on to build a career in the British Army. Jorge didn't see his parents again until 1967. In 1947, Sabina was returned to her native Poland, where she spent three months in a Red Cross hospital. In 1945, Pianowski was freed by the American army. The following year, in 1946, he was released from the German work camp, but chose not to return to Poland. Instead, he went to a displaced persons camp, where he lived in the American-controlled sector of Germany.

In the late 1940s, a ballet patroness in Boston, upon learning of Pianowski’s circumstances, arranged for him to go to Boston and direct the Boston Ballet Center In 1952, Pianowski went to Amarillo, Texas to head the ballet school at the Musical Arts Conservatory Four years later, in 1956, Pianowski became an American citizen. On July 16, 1958, Pianowski was reunited with his wife thanks to the efforts of Neil and Camille Hess in Amarillo. In 1958, Pianowski and Sabina moved to Seattle for Sabina's health. In 1962, Neill Hess received a letter from Pianowski’s physician informing him that Pianowski had been diagnosed with cancer. In response, Mr. Hess and his wife secured an apartment for the Pianowskis and arranged for their return to Amarillo. Pianowski and his wife were reunited with their son Jorge in Amarillo, Texas, one week before Pianowski passed away.

== Personal life ==
Pianowki married Sabina Sniezko-Blocka who was born 1895 in Minsk, then part of the USSR. Coming from a family of physicians—both her father and grandfather practiced medicine—Sabina was one of eight children, with seven brothers. Pianowski had one son, Jorge, who was born in Bergenfield, New Jersey in 1921. Jorge later served as a sergeant for the British Army Reserve. He married, and went on to have five sons.

Pianowski’s mementos from his time with Anna Pavlova, along with other mementos from his artistic career, were lost in the fire that destroyed the Warsaw theater during World War II.

== Death ==
Pianowski died March 30, 1967, of cancer. He is buried at the Llano Cemetery in Amarillo, Texas. His wife Sabina died October 31, 1972, in Panhandle, Texas, and is buried at the Panhandle cemetery. Pianowski's son Jorge died in 1971 in a plane crash.
