= Herring Hotel (Amarillo, Texas) =

- U.S. National Register of Historic Places
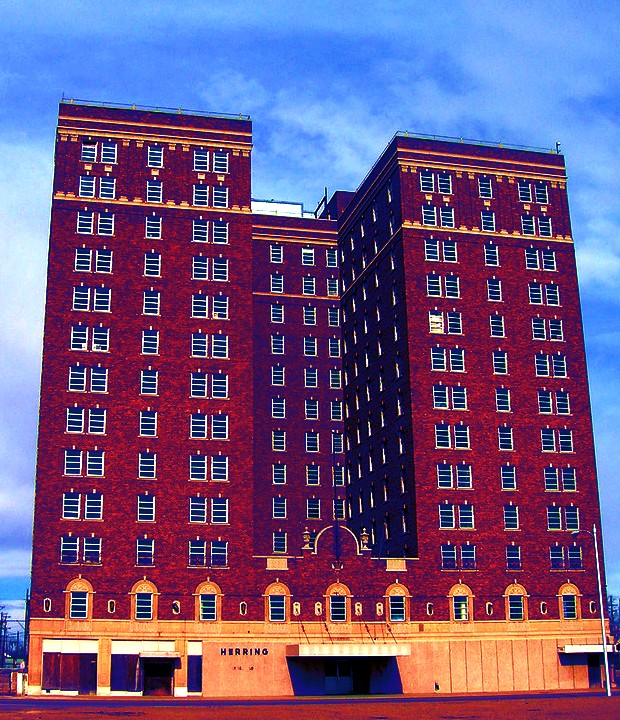
- Herring Hotel

- Location within Texas Location within the United States
- Location: 311 SE 3rd Avenue; Amarillo, Texas
- Coordinates: 35°12′37″N 101°49′57″W
- Built: 1926
- Built by: Cornelius Taylor Herring
- Architect: Shepard and Wiser
- Architectural style: Art Deco
- NRHP reference No.: 100009886
- Added to NRHP: January 25, 2024

The Herring Hotel is one of the oldest buildings in downtown Amarillo, Texas. It was completed in 1926 and was named after the builder and operator, Cornelius Taylor Herring (1849–1931). However, the Herring hotel closed in 1966 and the building was converted into an office building for the US government. The building has been vacant since 1978.

The building was added to the National Register of Historic Places on January 25, 2024.

In November 2025, plans were announced to restore the long-abandoned building as a luxury hotel, set to open in 2029.

== See also ==
- List of tallest buildings in Amarillo
- National Register of Historic Places listings in Potter County, Texas
