= Thomas M. Watlington =

US Army major general (1904–1990)

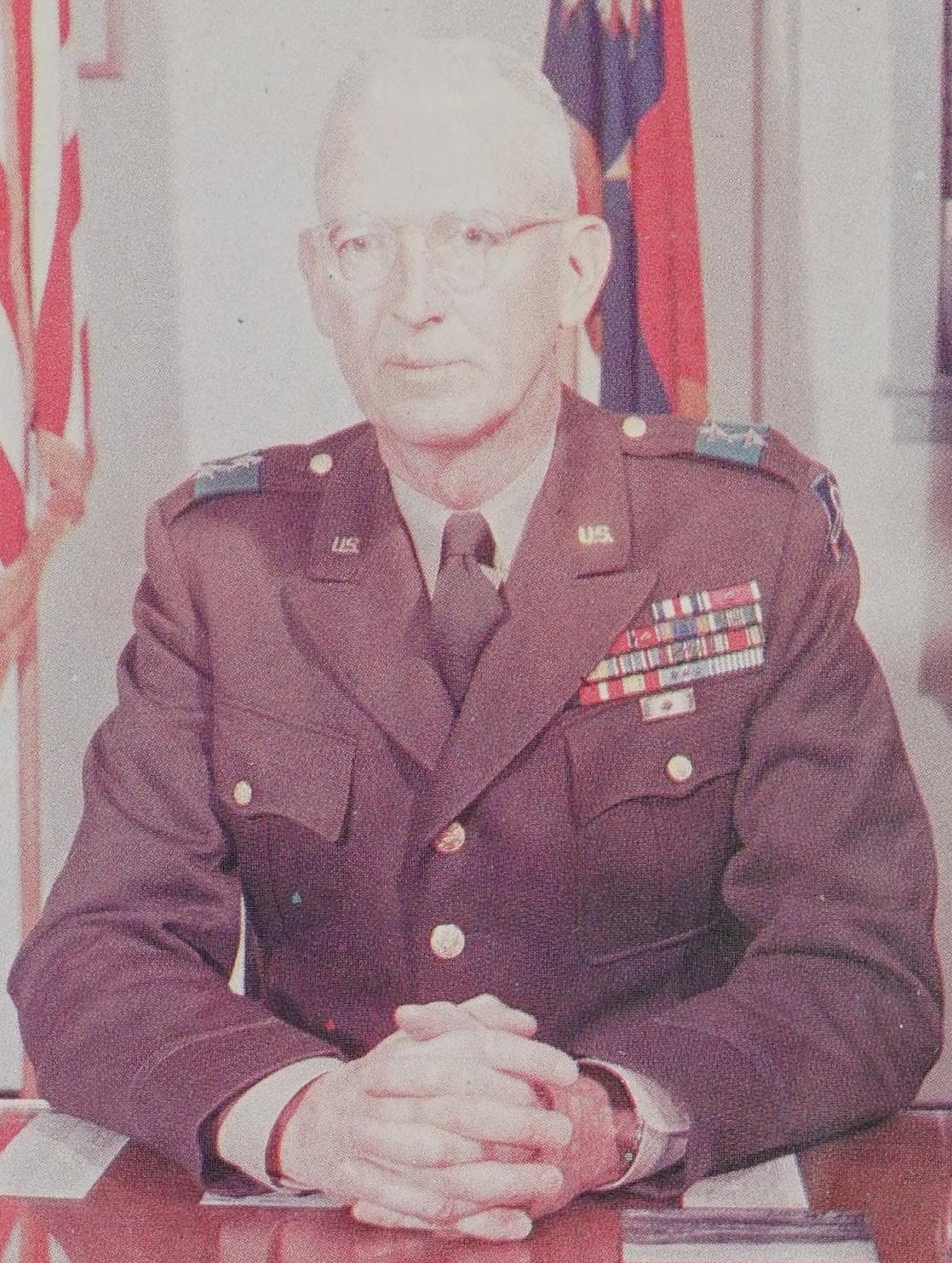
- Watlington as commander of the 8th Infantry Division in 1956
- Born: 22 May 1904; San Antonio, Texas, US
- Died: 22 July 1990 (aged 86); Amarillo, Texas, US
- Burial place: Llano Cemetery, Amarillo, Texas, US
- Alma mater: United States Military Academy; United States Army Command and General Staff College; National War College
- Spouse(s): Mary Madeleine "Chick" Conley (m. 1928–1968) Estelle Elizabeth Fariss (m. 1969–1990)
- Children: 2
- Relatives: Edgar Thomas Conley (father in law)
- Military career
- Service: United States Army
- Service years: 1927–1961
- Rank: Major General
- Nickname: Wat
- Service number: 016780
- Unit: US Army Field Artillery Branch
- Commands: Military Police Detachment, 1st Field Artillery Regiment; Battery A, 17th Field Artillery Regiment; 2nd Infantry Division Artillery; Director of Extension Courses, US Army Armor School; X Corps Artillery; 8th Infantry Division
- Wars: World War II; Korean War
- Awards: Army Distinguished Service Medal; Silver Star; Legion of Merit (2); Bronze Star Medal (2); Air Medal; Army Commendation Medal; Complete List

Thomas M. Watlington (22 May 1904 – 22 July 1990) was a career officer in the United States Army. A 1927 graduate of the United States Military Academy at West Point, he served until retiring in 1961 and was a veteran of World War II and the Korean War. Watlington's commands included the 2nd Infantry Division Artillery, X Corps Artillery, and 8th Infantry Division, and his awards included the Army Distinguished Service Medal, Silver Star, two awards of the Legion of Merit, two awards of the Bronze Star Medal, the Air Medal, and the Army Commendation Medal.

A native of San Antonio, Texas, Watlington was raised in Oklahoma, Colorado, and Wyoming, and graduated from high school in Cheyenne in 1922. After a year at the University of Wyoming, he began attendance at West Point, from which he graduated in 1927. Commissioned as a Field Artillery officer, in the years before World War II he carried out Artillery assignments in the United States and Panama. During the war, he served as executive officer of III Corps Artillery, and took part in campaigns including Northern France, Rhineland, and Ardennes, as well as the Western Allied invasion of Germany.

Prior to the Korean War, Watlington served as executive officer for the U.S. members of the joint U.S-Soviet Union commission the negotiated the Division of Korea, followed by assignment as assistant chief of staff for intelligence (G-2) for U.S. Army Forces In Korea (USAFIK). During the war, he served as commander of 2nd Infantry Division Artillery, which was followed by a posting as commander of X Corps Artillery. After the war, his postings included assistant commandant of the Field Artillery School at Fort Sill and commander of the 8th Infantry Division. His final assignment was assistant director of the National Security Agency, and he retired in 1961.

In retirement, Watlington resided first in Maryland, and later in Amarillo, Texas. He died in Amarillo on 22 July 1990 and was buried at Llano Cemetery in Amarillo.

== Early life ==
Thomas Morgan Watlington was born in San Antonio, Texas on 22 May 1904, a son of Thomas Morgan Watlington (1869–1939) and Bertha (Griesenbeck) Watlington (1870–1966). He was raised and educated in Oklahoma City, Denver, and Cheyenne, and graduated from Cheyenne High School (now Cheyenne Central High School) in 1922. He attended the University of Wyoming from 1922 to 1923. In 1922, he competed for appointments to the United States Naval Academy (Annapolis) and United States Military Academy (West Point) offered by Wyoming's congressional delegation; in 1923, he received an appointment to West Point from US Representative Frank W. Mondell.

Watlington attended West Point from 1923 to 1927 and graduated ranked 47th of 203. At graduation, he was commissioned as a second lieutenant of Field Artillery. Among his classmates who also became general officers were Guy S. Meloy Jr., Ralph Wise Zwicker, Philip De Witt Ginder, and James Francis Collins. Among his notable classmates who did not attain general officer rank were George Van Horn Moseley Jr. and John L. Hines Jr.

== Start of career ==
Watlington's initial assignment was with the 6th Field Artillery Regiment at Fort Hoyle, Maryland, where he served from September 1927 to September 1930. From September 1930 to July 1932, he served with the 2nd Field Artillery Regiment at Fort Davis, Panama. From September 1932 to May 1933, he was a student in the Battery Officers' Course at Fort Sill, Oklahoma's Field Artillery School. He was promoted to first lieutenant in February 1933.

=== Family ===
In September 1928, Watlington married Mary Madeleine "Chick" Conley, the daughter of Major General Edgar Thomas Conley. They were the parents of two children and divorced in 1968. In 1969, he married Estelle Elizabeth Fariss; they remained married until his death.

== Continued career ==
From May 1933 to August 1934, Watlington commanded the military police detachment of the 1st Field Artillery Regiment. From August 1934 to June 1939, he served on the West Point faculty as an instructor in the Department of English. He was promoted to captain in June 1937. In October 1939, Watlington was assigned to command Battery A, 17th Field Artillery Regiment at Fort Bragg, North Carolina. In November 1940, he was assigned as executive officer of 1st Battalion, 17th Field Artillery Regiment. In January 1941, he was promoted to temporary major.

In April 1941, Watlington was assigned to the faculty of the Field Artillery School and served as a member of its Training Literature Board. In February 1942, he was promoted to temporary lieutenant colonel and in July he was assigned as an instructor for the Field Artillery Officer Advanced Course. From November 1942 to February 1943, he was a student at the United States Army Command and General Staff College, after which he returned to his instructor position at the Artillery school. After temporary staff duty with the Army Service Forces in Washington, DC from July to October 1943, from October 1943 to January 1944 Watlington was posted to Fort McPherson, Georgia as assistant chief of staff for operations (G-3) on the staff of III Corps. From January to August 1944, he served at the Presidio of Monterey, California as executive officer of III Corps Artillery. Watlington was promoted to temporary colonel on 17 February 1944 and permanent major on 14 June 1944.

From August 1944 to July 1945, Watlington served as III Corps Artillery's executive officer during combat in the European theatre of World War II, including the Northern France, Rhineland, and Ardennes campaigns and the Western Allied invasion of Germany. In July 1945, he was assigned as executive officer of XVIII Airborne Corps Artillery at Fort Campbell, Kentucky. In November 1945, he was posted to Fort Jackson, South Carolina and assigned as assistant Artillery officer V Corps Artillery. In April 1946, Watlington was assigned as director of extension courses at the Fort Knox, Armor School.

== Later career ==
In August 1947, Watlington was assigned to Korea as executive officer for the U.S. members of the joint commission the United States and the Union of Soviet Socialist Republics formed to determine the Division of Korea. In December 1947, he was assigned as assistant chief of staff for intelligence (G-2) for U.S. Army Forces In Korea (USAFIK). He was promoted to permanent lieutenant colonel on 15 July 1948. Watlington's wartime service resulted in the award of equivalent credit for completion of the Armed Forces Staff College. In January 1949, Watlington returned to the United States and was assigned to the staff of the U.S. Army's assistant chief of staff for operations and training (G-3). From August 1949 to June 1950, he attended the National War College. After graduating, he was assigned as a member of the Joint Strategic Plans Group in the Office of the Joint Chiefs of Staff.

Watlington was assigned to Korean War duty as commander of 2nd Infantry Division Artillery, where he served from May to December 1952. He was then assigned to command X Corps Artillery, and he remained in this position until July 1953. Upon returning to the United States, Watlington was assigned as assistant commandant of the Field Artillery School at Fort Sill. From August to November 1955, he served in the office of the army G-3. From January 1956 to August 1957, he commanded the 8th Infantry Division, first at Fort Carson, Colorado and then in West Germany as part of Operation Gyroscope. Watlington was well-regarded by his superiors; when he served in Korea, Eighth Army commander General James Van Fleet stated that Watlington was the best division artillery commander in the theater. When he commanded the 8th Infantry Division, Seventh Army commander General Bruce C. Clarke regarded him as the best division commander in West Germany. On the other hand, some contemporaries, including his assistant division commander Harold K. Johnson, regarded Watlington as pompous and fixated on pet peeves, such as his attempts to court-martial 8th Infantry Division soldiers who did not meet height and weight standards.

In August 1957, Watlington was assigned as deputy chief of staff for administration (G-1) on the United States European Command (EUCOM) staff in France, and he later served as EUCOM's deputy chief of staff for operations (G-3). In January 1959, he was assigned as assistant director of the National Security Agency at Fort Meade, Maryland. He served in this post until retiring from the army in July 1961. In retirement, Watlington resided first in Kensington, Maryland and later on Gibson Island, Maryland. For several years, he worked to aid Francis Dodd, an army officer in command of a Korean War prisoner of war camp who had been held hostage for three days after prisoners executed an uprising. Army leaders criticized Dodd for providing North Korea a propaganda victory; he was reduced in rank from brigadier general to colonel and forced to retire. Dodd died in 1973, but in 1977, Watlington succeeded at persuading senior army officials to restore Dodd's rank and adjust his retired pay.

After marrying his second wife in 1969, Watlington became a resident of Amarillo, Texas. He died in Amarillo on 22 July 1990. Watlington was buried at Llano Cemetery in Amarillo.

== Awards ==
Watlington's awards included:

- Army Distinguished Service Medal
- Silver Star
- Legion of Merit with oak leaf cluster
- Bronze Star Medal with oak leaf cluster and "V" device for valor
- Air Medal
- Army Commendation Medal with oak leaf cluster
- Legion of Honor (Officer) (France)
- Croix de Guerre with Palm (France)
- Croix de Guerre for Foreign Theaters with Palm (France)
- Order of Military Merit (Third Class) with Gold Star (South Korea)

== Dates of rank ==
Watlington's dates of rank were:

- Second Lieutenant, 14 June 1927
- First Lieutenant, 1 February 1933
- Captain, 14 June 1937
- Major (Army of the United States), 31 January 1941
- Lieutenant Colonel (Army of the United States), 1 February 1942
- Colonel, (Army of the United States), 17 February 1944
- Major, 14 June 1944
- Lieutenant Colonel, 15 July 1948
- Colonel, 29 December 1950
- Brigadier General, 24 June 1952
- Major General, 13 April 1955
- Major General (Retired), 1 July 1961
