= James Fuller McKinley =

United States Army general (1880–1941)

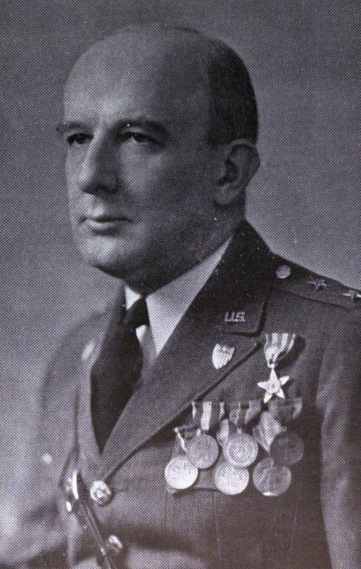
- U.S. Army Recruiting News, June 15, 1935
- Born: February 22, 1880; San Francisco, California
- Died: January 17, 1941 (aged 60); Terrell Hills, Texas
- Burial place: Fort Sam Houston National Cemetery
- Spouse: Margaret Disoway (m. 1912-1941, his death)
- Children: 3
- Relatives: William McKinley (uncle)
- Military career
- Allegiance: United States of America
- Branch: United States Army
- Service years: 1898-1935
- Rank: Major General
- Commands: Adjutant General of the United States Army
- Conflicts: Spanish–American War; Philippine–American War; Moro Rebellion; Second Occupation of Cuba; World War I
- Awards: Silver Star (2)

James Fuller McKinley (February 22, 1880 – January 17, 1941) was an American military officer who served as Adjutant General of the United States Army from 1933 to 1935. He attained the rank of major general.

== Early life ==
James Fuller McKinley was born in San Francisco, California on February 22, 1880, a son of James McKinley and Eliza Howe (Fuller) McKinley. McKinley's relations included William McKinley, his father's brother. In 1898, he graduated from Canton High School in Canton, Ohio.

== Start of career ==
On June 24, 1898, he enlisted for service in the Volunteers during the Spanish–American War and became a private in Company I, 8th Ohio Infantry Regiment. McKinley enlisted at the same time as his first cousin, John Dewalt Barber. William McKinley was serving as president, and some friends suggested he appoint his nephews as officers, but they preferred to enlist so they would not be accused of receiving special treatment. The unit arrived in Siboney, Cuba on July 11, 1898, performed garrison duties, and departed in August after suffering several non-combat losses due to tropical diseases. McKinley was mustered out on November 21, 1898.

After being discharged, McKinley applied for a commission in the Regular Army, which he received on February 6, 1899. Appointed a second lieutenant of cavalry, he was assigned to the 6th Cavalry Regiment and served in the Philippines, including detached duty as aide-de-camp to General Samuel Baldwin Marks Young. While in the Philippines, he was promoted to first lieutenant in the 11th Cavalry, but continued to serve as Young's aide. While serving in the Philippines, McKinley took part in battles at Cullenbeng and Aligangan, for which he received Silver Star citations that were later converted to awards of the Silver Star medal.

In 1901, Young returned to the United States, and McKinley continued to serve as his aide. When Young traveled to Europe to attend Imperial German Army maneuvers in 1903, McKinley went with him.In 1903, McKinley requested to return to the Philippines. He participated in several engagements in the Sulu Archipelago, and received commendations from Generals Hugh L. Scott and Leonard Wood.

McKinley left the Philippines in 1906, and was promoted to captain before being assigned to duty in Cuba. He returned to the United States in 1909 and was assigned to duty with the 11th Cavalry at Fort Oglethorpe, Georgia. In 1910, McKinley was selected for attendance at the Army School of the Line, from which he graduated in 1911. From 1911 to 1916, McKinley served with the 11th Cavalry and was assigned as the regimental adjutant.

== World War I ==
In July 1917, three months after the American entry into World War I, he was promoted to major. In August, he was promoted to temporary lieutenant colonel in the National Army as the armed forces began to expand its ranks for service in the war. Assigned to the 351st Infantry Regiment at Camp Dodge, Iowa, he served until July 1918. McKinley left Camp Dodge when he was promoted to temporary colonel and appointed to command the 62nd Infantry Regiment at Camp Fremont, California.

Later in 1918, McKinley was assigned as an inspector general. He carried out reviews of Army units organizing and training at Camp Mills, New York and Camp Lee, Virginia before receiving appointment as inspector general for the district based at Columbus Barracks, Ohio.

== Later career ==
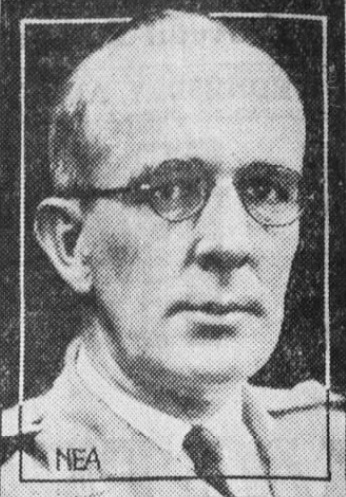
McKinley at the time of his promotion to brigadier general in 1929

McKinley reverted to his prewar rank of major in early 1920, and was assigned as district inspector general in charge of Reserve Officers' Training Corps affairs. He was promoted to lieutenant colonel on July 1 and in September 1920 he was assigned as a district inspector general for the Fourth Corps Area with duty at Charleston Ordnance Depot, South Carolina and Fort McPherson, Georgia. On May 9, 1921, McKinley was promoted to colonel.

From 1922 to 1924, McKinley was adjutant of the 1st Cavalry Division at Fort Bliss, Texas. On March 14, 1923, he transferred to the Adjutant General's Department. From 1924 to 1927, he was adjutant of the Eighth Corps Area, based at Fort Sam Houston, Texas. From 1927 to 1929, McKinley was adjutant of the Panama Canal Department.

In 1929, McKinley was promoted to brigadier general and assigned as Assistant Adjutant General of the Army. He was promoted to major general on June 1, 1933, and succeeded Charles Higbee Bridges as Adjutant General of the Army. McKinley served as the Adjutant General until retiring on October 31, 1935, and was succeeded by Edgar Thomas Conley.

== Later life ==
After retiring, McKinley was president of the Fort Sam Houston National Bank. He died at his home in Terrell Hills, Texas on January 17, 1941. McKinley was buried at Fort Sam Houston National Cemetery.

== Family ==
In 1912, McKinley married Margaret Disoway (1890–1979). They were the parents of three children—Margaret (1913–1989), William (1916–1957), and James (1918–2001). Margaret McKinley was the wife of Army general John Cogswell Oakes. William and James McKinley were both career Army officers who attained the rank of colonel.

== Awards ==
- Silver Star with oak leaf cluster
- Spanish Campaign Medal
- Army of Cuban Occupation Medal
- Philippine Campaign Medal
- Mexican Service Medal
- Victory Medal

== See also ==
- List of Adjutant Generals of the U.S. Army

== Sources ==
- "You Think You Are Related to President William McKinley". Featured Anecdotes. Ramsayer Research Library. 2 October 2014.
- Heitman, Francis B. (1903). Historical Register and Dictionary of the United States Army, Volume 1. Washington, D.C.: Government Printing Office.
- Adjutant General's Office (1906). Official Army Register for 1907. Washington, D.C.: United States Department of War. p. 144.
- "Nephews of the President" (PDF). New York Times. June 24, 1898.
- Secretary of War. Official Army Register. Washington D.C.: United States Government Printing Office, 1939.

Military offices
Preceded by Charles Higbee Bridges	Adjutant General of the U. S. Army; February 2, 1933-October 31, 1935	Succeeded by Edgar T. Conley
