= Edgar Thomas Conley =

US Army officer (1874 - 1956)

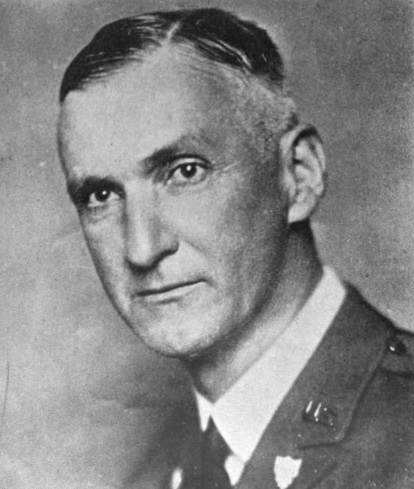
- U.S. Army Recruiting News, August 1, 1933
- Born: April 12, 1874; Montgomery County, Maryland
- Died: August 21, 1956 (aged 82); Montgomery County, Maryland
- Burial place: St. Mark's Cemetery; Fairland, Maryland
- Relatives: Thomas M. Watlington (son-in-law)
- Military career
- Allegiance: United States of America
- Branch: United States Army
- Service years: 1897–1938
- Rank: Major General
- Commands: Adjutant General of the U.S. Army
- Conflicts: Spanish–American War; Siege of Santiago; Philippine–American War; Battle of Zapote Bridge
- Awards: Distinguished Service Medal

Edgar Thomas Conley (April 12, 1874 – August 21, 1956) was an American military officer who was Adjutant General of the United States Army from 1935 to 1938.

== Early life ==
Edgar Thomas Conley was born April 12, 1874 in Fairland, Montgomery County, Maryland, United States of America. Son of Charles William and Martha E. (Larrick) Conley, who owned a family farm called Green Ridge. Edgar was apparently named for an uncle born in 1840, who was a member of the 2d Maryland (Confederate Army) who died during the American Civil War. After graduating from Episcopal High School, in Alexandria, Virginia, Conley attended Lehigh University for a semester and then entered Braden's preparatory school in Highland Falls.

He was admitted to the United States Military Academy at West Point, New York on June 15, 1893. In 1905 Conley married Claire M. Conley, who was born in Ontario Canada, but became a naturalized citizen around 1900. The couple met when Conley was assigned to Fort Niagara, New York, and the marriage produced three children. Their son Edgar T. Conley attained the rank of brigadier general in the army and was the husband of Cecile Olive Truesdell. Cecile Truesdell Conley was the daughter of Major General Karl Truesdell.

== Military career ==
=== Early years ===
Conley as a West Point cadet

Edgar Thomas Conley successfully completed his studies at West Point, where he earned the lifetime nickname of "Sheriff" for mediating a fight between cadets, and did well both academically and in extracurricular activities. Conley graduated and was commissioned a 2nd lieutenant of Infantry on June 11, 1887. After a brief stint with the US 15th Infantry in the New Mexico Territory, newly promoted 1st Lieutenant Conley was assigned to Company G, 21st Infantry on February 1, 1898. The 21st Infantry was deployed for service in the Spanish-American War, landing on Cuba with the Fifth Army Corps in late June 1898. On July 1, 1898, the 21st Infantry took part in the assault on San Juan Hill outside Santiago, Cuba. Lieutenant Conley was cited for gallantry in the battle, making him eligible to wear the Silver Star Medal when it was approved in 1932.

Soon thereafter, the 21st Infantry was shipped to the Philippines to reinforce the American Army dealing with the growing Philippine Insurrection. There, Conley took part in many operations around Manila and outlying districts, earning commendation from the senior leaders for his skill in the field. Captain Conley remained with the 21st Infantry as it returned to the United States, before serving at Fort Niagara, and back in the Philippines. For a period of time, Captain Conley was assigned as the Professor of Military Science and Tactics (PMS&T) at the Maryland Agriculture College (today part of the University of Maryland).

=== World War I era service ===
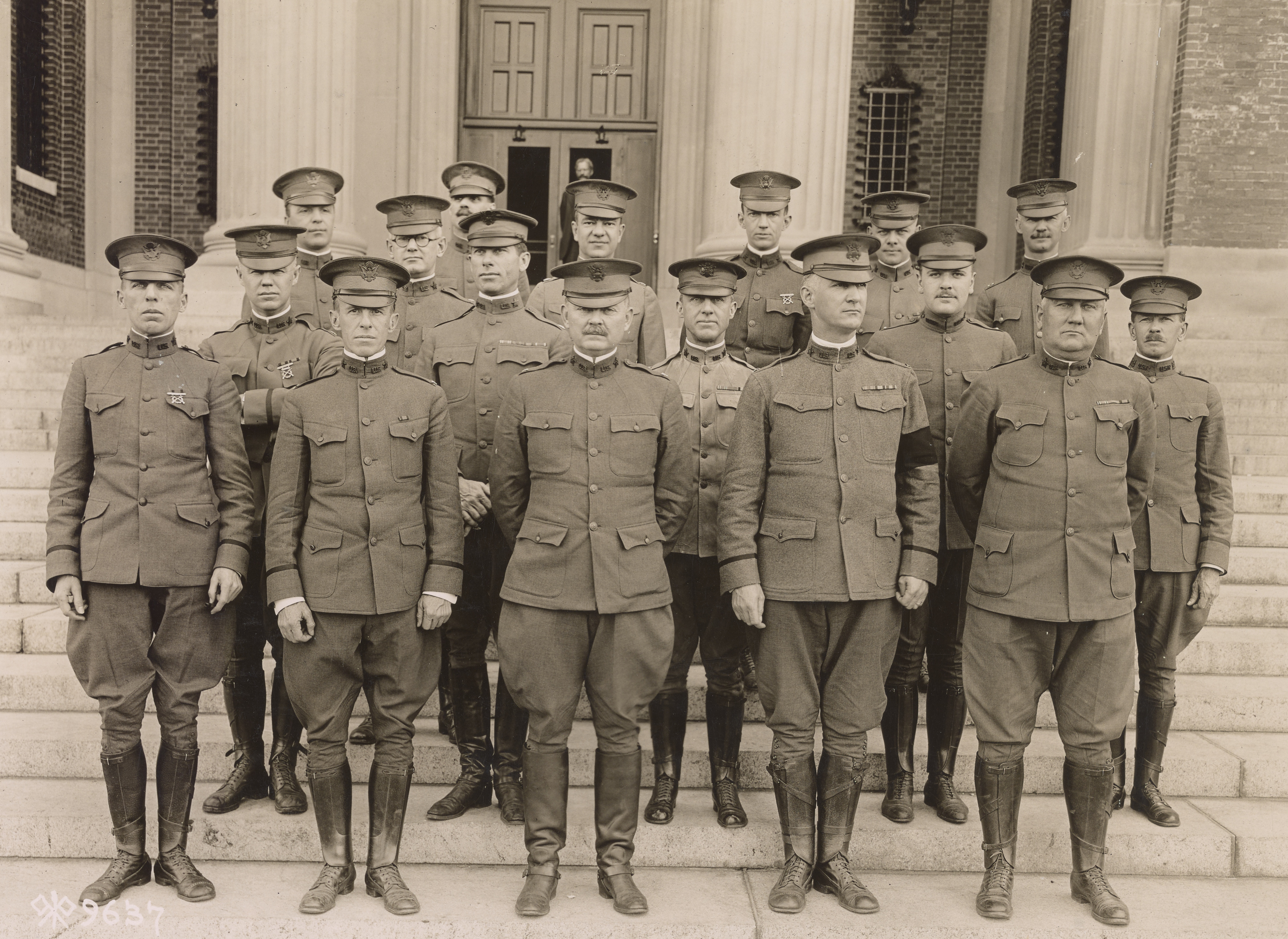
Officers of the War Plans Branch, War Plans Division, General Staff, standing outside the entrance of the Army War College at Washington, D.C., May 1918. Lieutenant Colonel Edgar T. Conley is standing in the front row, second from the right, between Colonel John E. Stehlens (left) and Colonel C. H. Hilton (right).

After the American declaration of war and entry into World War I, Major Conley, along with most prewar Regular Army officers) received temporary promotions in the National Army (forerunner of the modern United States Army Reserve). Conley was promoted to Lieutenant Colonel (National Army) on August 5, 1917, followed by orders to The Adjutant General's Office at the War Department in Washington, D.C., on August 20, 1917. Conley was promoted to Colonel (National Army) on February 6, 1918. Conley transferred to the Office of the Chief of Staff in April 1918, where he remained until sailing for France in September 1918. While in France, Conley completed the Command and Staff College Course at Langres, France before joining the American Expeditionary Force's office of the Provost Marshal in January 1919. There, Conley worked as the Chief of the prisoners of war division for the AEF, for which he received a letter of commendation from the Provost Marshal General. Colonel Conley departed France on December 2, 1919, and returned to the United States.

=== Postwar service ===
Colonel Conley seems to have returned to work at the Adjutant General's office, although he was not officially transferred to the Adjutant General's Department until May 1, 1922. In the interim, Conley was honorably discharged from the National Army on June 30, 1920, and recommissioned as a Colonel in the Regular Army on July 1, 1920. During the same time period, Colonel Conley was awarded the Distinguished Service Medal on November 21, 1921:

Edgar T. Conley, colonel, Infantry, United States Army. For exceptionally meritorious and distinguished services as the Chief of the Prisoners of War Division, the Provost Marshal General's Department. He had charge of and was responsible for all matters concerning the prisoners of war labor companies, escort companies, and inclosures (sic). His sound judgment, marked ability, and devotion to duty resulted in the handling of the delicate prisoner of war questions in such a manner as to produce only commendation. His services were especially valuable to the Government. Address: Care of The Adjutant General of the Army, Washington D.C. Entered Military Academy from Maryland.

Colonel Conley remained at the War Department through the remainder of the 1920s and early 1930s. On June 1, 1933, Conley was appointed as assistant to the adjutant general with a concurrent promotion to brigadier general. On November 1, 1935 Conley was promoted to major general and appointed as The Adjutant General of the Army. Major General Conley retired on April 30, 1938 due to reaching the mandatory retirement age.

== Personal life ==
Of Conley's children, Edgar T. Conley Jr. followed his father to West Point and was commissioned into the U.S. Army. Lieutenant Colonel Edgar T. Conley Jr. commanded a tank battalion from the D-Day landings to the end of the war in the European Theater of World War II.

In 1927, Conley inherited the family farm "Green Ridge" near Fairland, Maryland. Conley lived there when assigned to duty in the region, and spent his off-duty time in tending the farm. After his retirement, Conley retired to Green Ridge, and devoted his time to farming, family and volunteering at his local church. General Conley died at home on August 20, 1956.

== See also ==
- List of Adjutant Generals of the U.S. Army

== Sources ==
- Cullum, George W. (1901). Biographical Register of the Officers and Graduates of the U. S. Military Academy, Volume IV. Cambridge, Massachusetts: Riverside Press. p. 637.
- Cullum, George W. (1910). Biographical Register of the Officers and Graduates of the U. S. Military Academy, Volume V. Saginaw, Michigan: Seeman & Peters. pp. 587–588.
- Cullum, George W. (1920). Biographical Register of the Officers and Graduates of the U. S. Military Academy, Volume VI. Saginaw, Michigan: Seeman & Peters. p. 816.
- Cullum, George W. (1930). Biographical Register of the Officers and Graduates of the U. S. Military Academy, Volume VII. Chicago: R. R. Donnelley & Sons. p. 451.
- Cullum, George W. (1940). Biographical Register of the Officers and Graduates of the U. S. Military Academy Volume VIII. Chicago, Illinois: Lakeside Press. p. 111.
- "St. Mark's Cemetery in Fairland, Maryland". Conley Family Pages. Charles C. Hall.

Military offices
Preceded by James F. McKinley	Adjutant General of the U. S. Army; November 1, 1935 – April 30, 1938	Succeeded by Emory S. Adams
