= John M. Shelton =

- Born: 1853; Kentucky, U.S.
- Died: December 7, 1923 (aged 69–70); Fort Worth, Texas, U.S.
- Resting place: Llano Cemetery, Amarillo, Texas, U.S.
- Occupations: Rancher, banker
- Spouse: Flora Exum
- Children: 2 sons, 1 daughter

John M. Shelton (1853–1923) was an American rancher and banker. Born in Kentucky in the Antebellum South, he became a large landowner and banker in Texas in the postbellum era. Shelton founded a bank and loan company. He established the Bravo Ranch in Hartley County, Texas. By 1915, he was the owner of 28,000 head of cattle and 500,000 acres in the Texas Panhandle.

== Early life ==
John M. Shelton was born in 1853 in Kentucky. He took a wagon train to Fort Worth, Texas, shortly after the American Civil War.

== Career ==
Shelton purchased property in Fort Worth in the 1880s. According to the Amarillo Globe-News, "by 1890, Shelton had accumulated between 1,500 and 2,000 cattle and began his Lazy J brand." Shortly after, he purchased a ranch in Wheeler County, Texas, as well as rangeland in Wyoming and Montana. He sold his Wheeler County ranch in the 1910s.

Shelton co-founded the First State Bank of Shamrock, Texas, in 1904 with Oscar P. Jones. By the 1910s, he founded the John M. Shelton Loan Company in Amarillo.

Shelton purchased 211,000 acres in the Texas Panhandle, in Oldham County and Hartley County, Texas, in 1914. A year later, in 1915, he purchased the Bravo Ranch, which spanned 111,000 acres in Hartley County, Texas, for US$540,000. The acreage came from the XIT Ranch. Shortly after the purchase of the ranch, he was the owner of 500,000 acres and 28,000 head of cattle in total. Shelton raised Hereford and Angus cattle on the Bravo Ranch.

== Personal life ==
Shelton married Flora Exum. They had two sons, J. Malcolm Shelton and James M. Shelton, and a daughter, Martha Houghton. They resided in Fort Worth, and later in Amarillo, Texas. Their Amarillo mansion, located at 1700 Polk Street, was completed in 1914. It was located on the most affluent street in Amarillo.

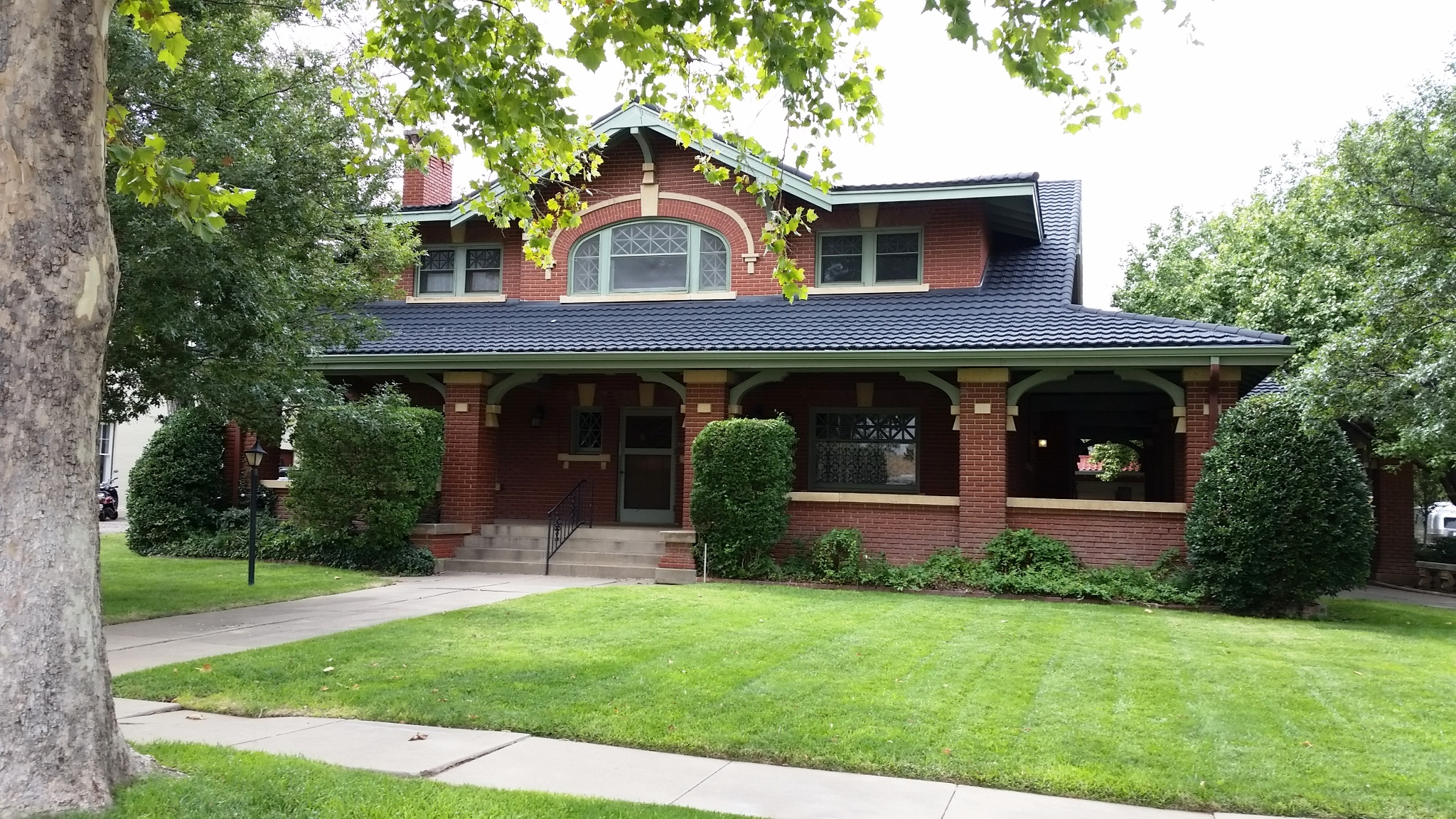
The Shelton-Houghton House in Amarillo, Texas.

== Death and legacy ==
Shelton died on December 7, 1923, in Fort Worth, Texas. He was buried at the Llano Cemetery in Amarillo.

The Shelton-Houghton House was donated to the Junior League of Amarillo in 1965. It is listed on the National Register of Historic Places.

Shelton's Bravo Ranch remains in the family. By 2015, it belongs to the majority landowners and great-grandsons, Malcolm and Jim Shelton.
