= Herring Bank =

- Company type: Private
- Founded: 1899
- Founder: Cornelius T. Herring
- Headquarters: Amarillo, Texas, United States
- Website: herringbank.com

The Herring Bank is a bank based in Amarillo, Texas.

== History ==
The bank was founded as the C. T. Herring Banking Company by Colonel Cornelius T. Herring in Vernon, Texas in 1899. It was later known as the Herring National Bank. It was chartered by the United States Department of the Treasury in 1903. It was renamed Herring Bank in 2005.
