= XIT Ranch =

Former cattle ranch in Texas

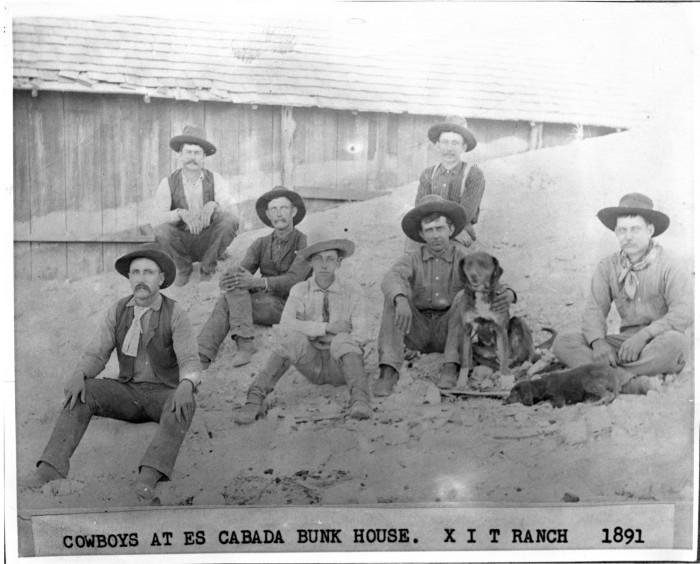
Cowboys at the XIT Ranch in 1891

The XIT Ranch was a cattle ranch in the Texas Panhandle which operated from 1885 to 1912. Comprising over 3,000,000 acres (12,000 km^{2}) of land, it ran for 200 miles (300 km) along the border with New Mexico, varying in width from 20 to 30 miles (30 to 50 km). The massive ranch stretched through ten counties in Texas and at its peak regularly handled 150,000 head of cattle. The brand "XIT" was chosen for its difficulty to alter thus thwarting rustlers.

== History ==
The western edge of the Texas Panhandle was historically inhabited by the Querecho and Teyas Indians. In 1879, the 16th Texas Legislature appropriated 3,000,000 acres (12,000 km^{2}) of land to finance a new state capitol. In 1882, in a special legislative session, the 17th Texas Legislature struck a bargain with Charles B. and John V. Farwell of Chicago, Illinois, under which a syndicate led by the Farwells, with mostly British investors, agreed to build a new Texas State Capitol in Austin and to accept the 3,000,000 acres (12,000 km^{2}) of Panhandle land as payment. The ranch stretched across all or portions of the counties of Dallam, Hartley, Oldham, Deaf Smith, Parmer, Castro, Bailey, Lamb, Cochran, and Hockley. Total expense for the capitol building amounted to $3,744,630.60, of which the Syndicate Company paid $3,224,593.45.

Though Mathias Schnell won the contract for constructing the new building in January 1882, by May he had assigned all interest to Taylor, Babcock and Company. This company was composed of Colonel Abner Taylor of Chicago, Colonel A.C. Babcock of Canton, and John V. and Charles B. Farwell of Chicago. Taylor was assigned company representative in June. Babcock inspected the capitol tract that same year, setting out from Tascosa on 23 March and arriving at the Yellow Houses on 27 April. His inspection noted the 1880 J.T. Munson survey used to define the capitol lands, and the northwest boundary of the state was defined by John H. Clark's 1859 survey. Clark's line defining the 103rd meridian, approved by Congress in 1891, turned out to be two to three miles west of the true meridian. The issue was not settled until partial owner John V. Farwell, Jr. and President William Howard Taft were instrumental in passing a joint resolution of Congress on February 24, 1911 by Congress honoring the Clark line. This action saved Texas a strip of land a few miles wide and 310 miles long.

== Development ==
In order to raise the capital needed to fence the ranch, build houses and barns, provide water, and purchase the cattle, John V. Farwell formed the Capitol Freehold Land and Investment Company, Limited, in London. The money was raised through the sale of debentures paying 5 percent interest. Directors of the company included John V. and Charles B. Farwell, Walter Potter, Henry Seton-Karr, Sir William Ewart, Edward M. Denny, Baron Thurlow, and the Marquis of Tweeddale, while the Earl of Aberdeen and Quintin Hogg were trustees. The company existed until 1909, when all bonds had been redeemed.

Company headquarters were located in the northern boundary of the ranch, at Buffalo Springs, with George Findlay directing business. Colonel B.H. Campbell became general manager and Berry Nations range foreman. The ranch started operations in 1885, purchasing cattle and moving them onto the ranch. By 1887, the herd was maintained at between 125,000 and 150,000 head, or about 20 acres (8.1 ha) per head. W.S. Mabry surveyed in the four-wire barbed wire fence line, and by 1886, 781 mi (1,257 km) of fence were in place, including a 260 mi (420 km) long west line and a 275 mi (443 km) long east line. Cross fences were added by the late 1890s to make 94 pastures, bringing the total to 1,500 mi (2,400 km) of fence. A telephone line connected Tascosa to Alamocitos in 1888. Though the northern portion of the ranch had plenty of water near Buffalo Springs, the portion south of the Canadian River needed wells, which were also surveyed in by Mabry. By 1900, the ranch had 335 windmills, producing water from an average depth of 125 ft (38 m). Additionally, 100 earthen dams were constructed.

Trail driver Ab Blocker devised the XIT brand. The branding iron was simply made with a five-inch-long (15 cm) straight bar, applied five times. Yet, the XIT brand was not immune from "brand burning" by rustlers, which involved burning the original brand into another brand. Cowboy legends also kept alive the myth that the brand means "Ten (in Roman numerals) In Texas." Each calf was branded with XIT on its side, the last numeral of the year on its shoulder, and the number of the division on its jaw.

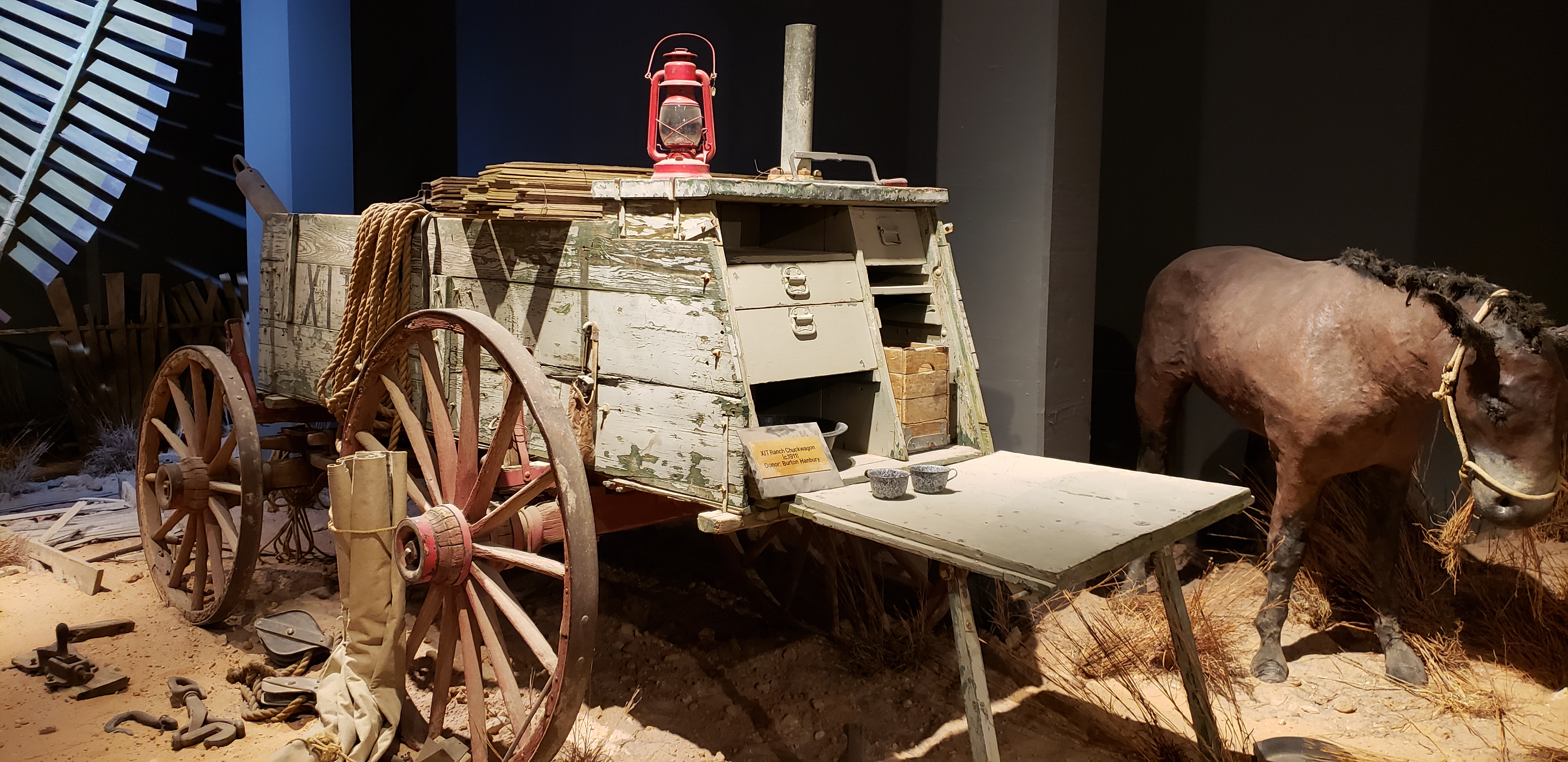
XIT Ranch chuck wagon, Panhandle Plains Historical Museum

The ranch was initially divided into 7 division headquarters, located at (1) Buffalo Springs, (2) Middle Water, (3) Ojo Bravo, (4) Rito Blanco, (5) Escarbada, (6) Spring Lake, and (7) Yellow Houses, with (8) Bovina added later. Each was equipped with residences, cellars, bunkhouses, store rooms, barns, corrals, and two-wagon freight outfit. Large warehouses were maintained at Tascosa in 1887, after the introduction of the Fort Worth and Denver Railroad, and in Bovina, after it was connected to the J.J. Hagerman's Pecos Valley and Northeastern Railroad in 1898. General headquarters were moved to Channing in 1890. Each division wrote a monthly report and an annual report containing details about the cattle, range weather, and the men employed. Buffalo Springs became the steer ranch, Middle Water the cull ranch, while Ojo Bravo, Escarbada, Spring Lake and Yellow Houses became breeding ranges. The 10–12 cowboys working a division in the winter increased to 25–30 in the summer.

Campbell's management led to the ranch becoming a "stopping place and rendezvous for a large number of bad men and criminals," in the words of A.L. Matlock. Matlock was picked by John V. Farwell to run the ranch in 1887. Matlock chose A.G. Boyce as his general range manager. Though the original stock consisted of Texas Longhorn cattle, in 1889, work started to improve the herd by introducing Hereford cattle and polled Aberdeen Angus. Registered herds were bought in 1892, and the Rito Blanco division bred the Angus, while the Escarbada, Spring Lake and Yellow Houses divisions bred the Herefords.

The Texas Trail was used for trail drives connecting Tascosa to Dodge City until 1885. Afterwards, the Northern Trail connected Buffalo Springs to the XIT range on Cedar Creek, 60 miles north of Miles City, Montana. That trail was used from 1886 until 1897. Over a period of 3 months, some 10,000 to 12,500 steers were moved from the Yellow Houses 1,000 miles north to Cedar Creek. There they would graze for two years before being shipped to Chicago.

== Decline ==
The original plan of the Capitol Company was colonization, with ranching viewed as a temporary use of the land until farmers arrived. In 1890, Matlock began using an immigration agency, and 80,000 acres (324 km^{2}) were prepared as farming tracts. Cattle prices crashed in 1886 and 1887, and in the fall of 1888, the ranch was unable to sell its cattle and make a profit. The ranch operated most years without showing any profit. Cattle rustling and predators such as the Mexican wolf led to further losses.

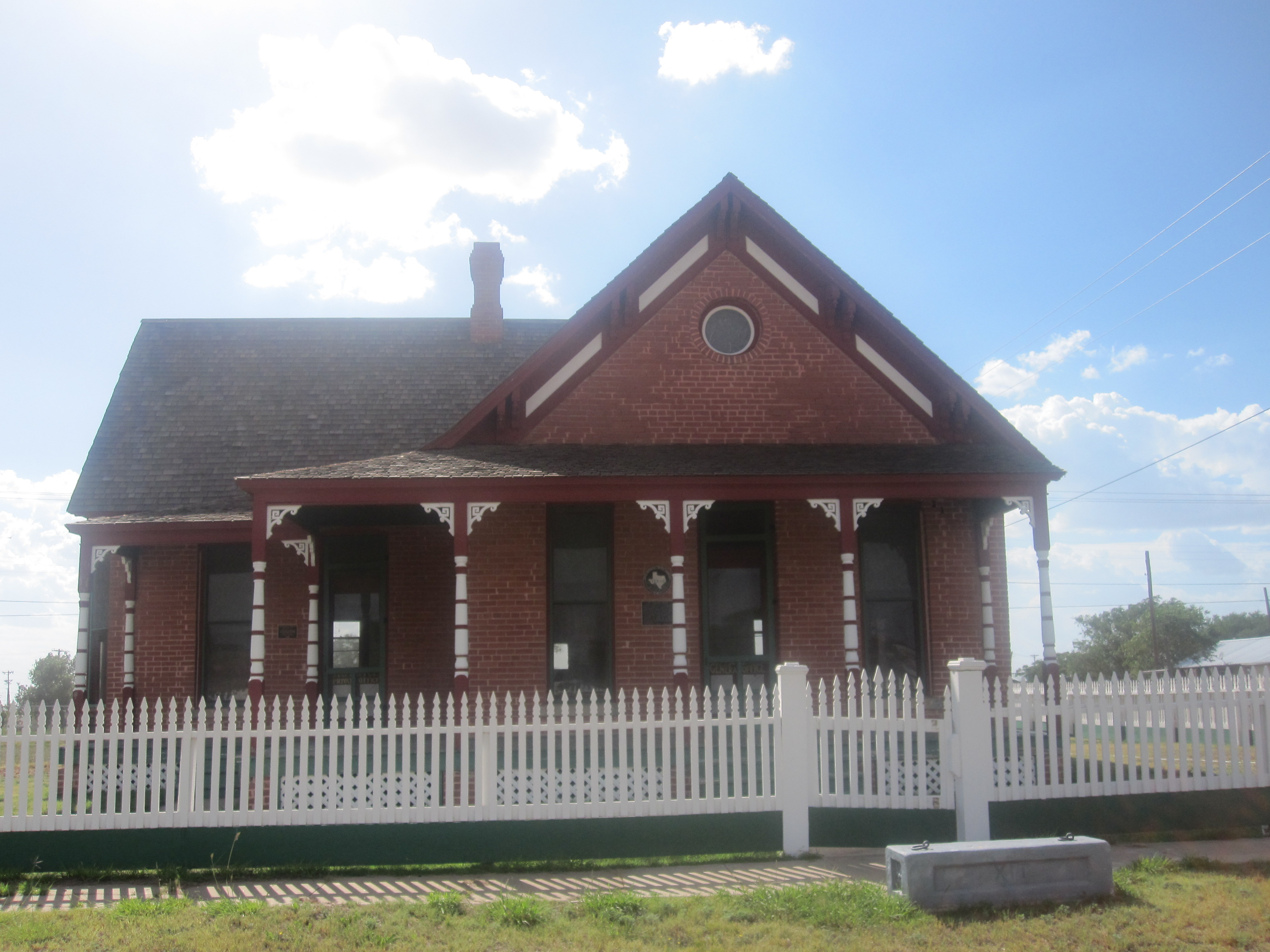
XIT Ranch office, Channing, Texas

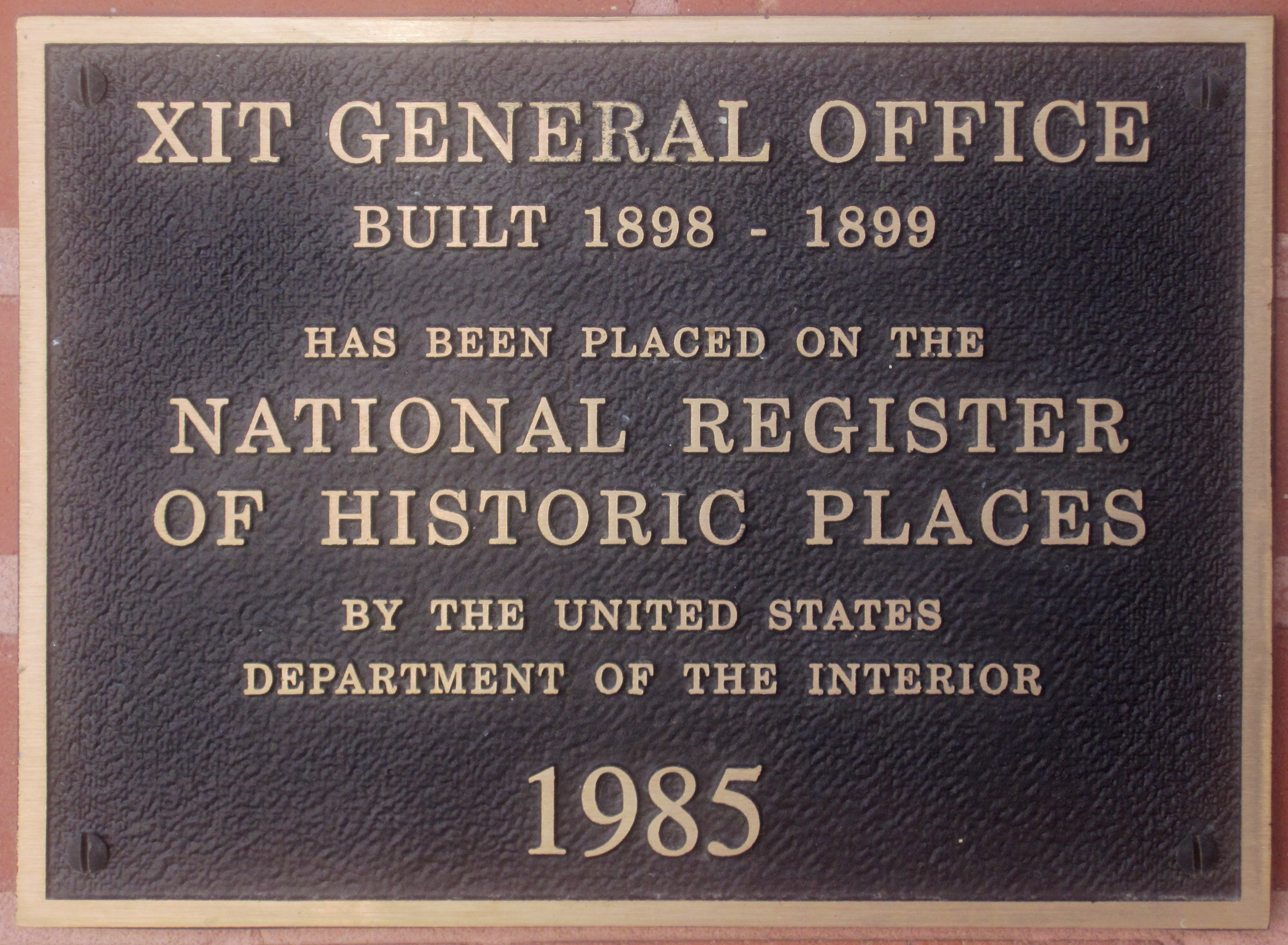
The General Office building was built in 1898–99 and added to the National Register of Historic Places in 1985.

In 1901, the ranch syndicate began selling off acreage to pay the bonds of the Capitol Freehold Land and Investment Company, Limited. Large tracts were sold to cattlemen such as George W. Littlefield, who bought 235,858.5 acres (954 km^{2}) of Yellow Houses in 1901. In 1904, the ranch started using land and development companies for wholesale purchases, but in 1905, 800,000 acres (3,237 km^{2}) were also divided up into 160 square-mile tracts. In 1905, to prevent speculation, the syndicate established a land commissioner and a real estate trust in 1915. This trust, Capitol Reservations Lands, operated until 1950. Yet, Capitol Mineral Rights Company retained much of the mineral rights.

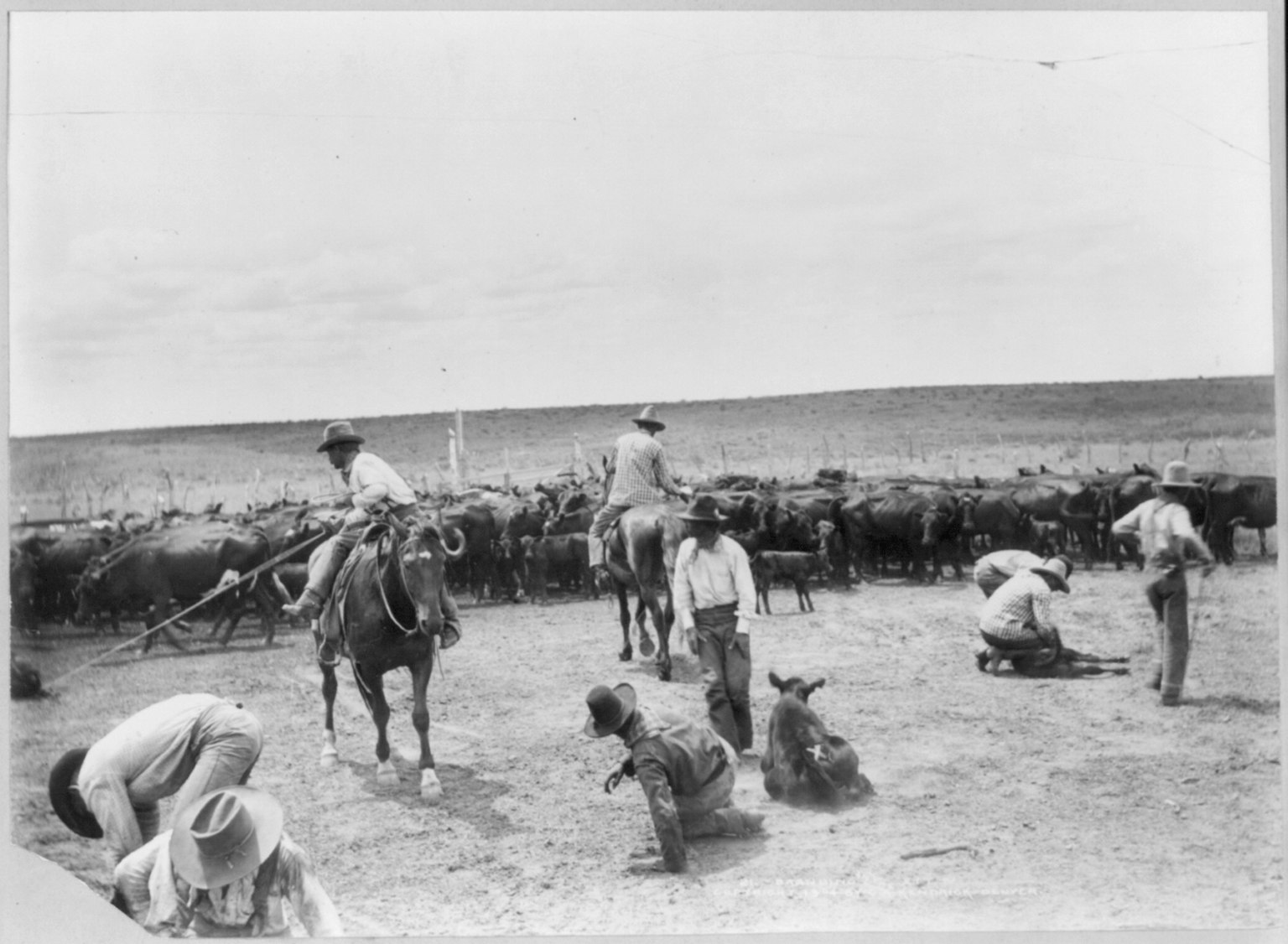
Branding on the XIT Ranch, 1904

The family of Minnie Lou Bradley, who went on to establish the Bradley 3 Ranch in Childress County east of Amarillo, made large purchases of XIT land. Other purchasers included Texas cattlemen William E. Halsell, and John M. Shelton. Lee Bivins bought 70,000 acres (283 km^{2}) from XIT's Capitol Syndicate. Located near Channing, Texas, the purchase included XIT headquarters. The last of the XIT cattle were sold on 1 Nov. 1912.

Recognizing that their earlier surveys exceeded the stipulated areas by 2–4 percent, the state of Texas sued the Syndicate in 1918, claiming the excess was 57,840.5 acres (234 km^{2}). As a consequence, the state recovered 27,613.6 acres (112 km^{2}) in Dallam County, and 30,226.9 acres (122 km^{2}) in Hartley County.

== Legacy ==
In remembrance of the massive ranch, the City of Dalhart hosts the XIT Museum and the annual XIT Rodeo and Reunion held the first Thursday through Sunday of August. The celebration includes three days of junior and professional (PRCA) rodeo events, the world's largest free barbecue, three nights of live music, a mud bog competition, an antique tractor pull, and other activities.

Several businesses in the Dalhart area use "XIT" in their names and styles.

Composer Charles Ives referenced the ranch in his song "Charlie Rutlage", No. 10 of his 114 songs collection.

== Gallery ==
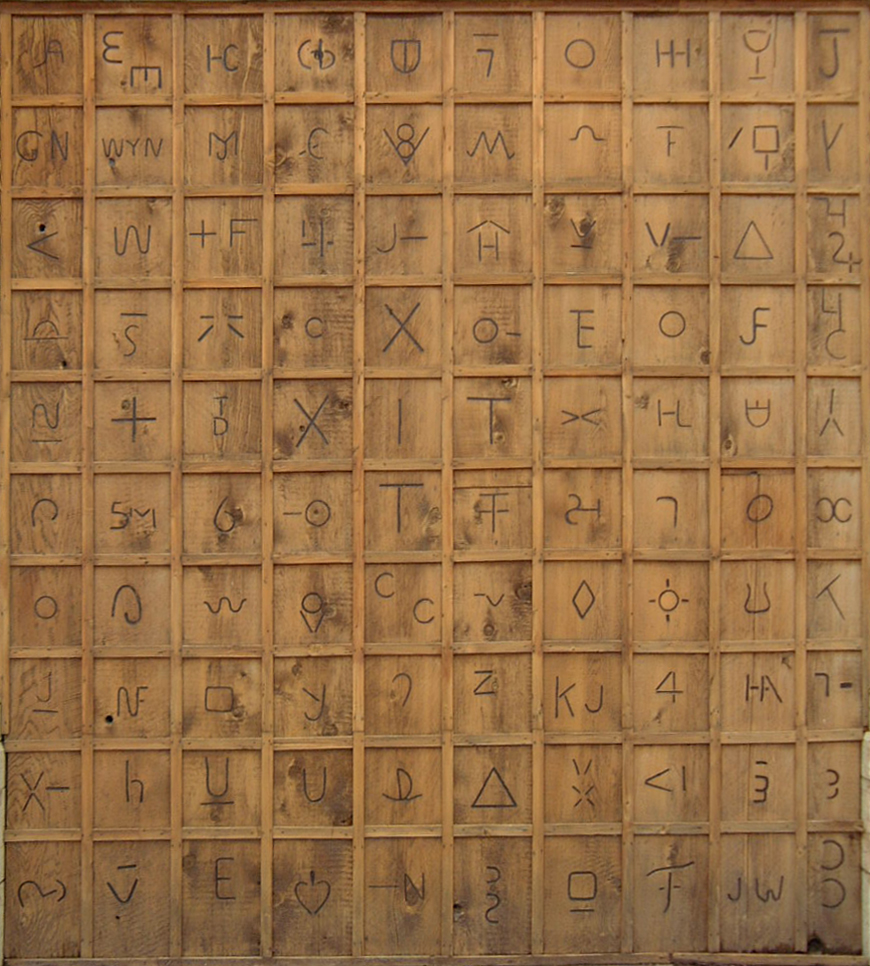
Display of local brands at the XIT Museum in Dalhart, Texas: Note the XIT brand at the center of the display (2002)

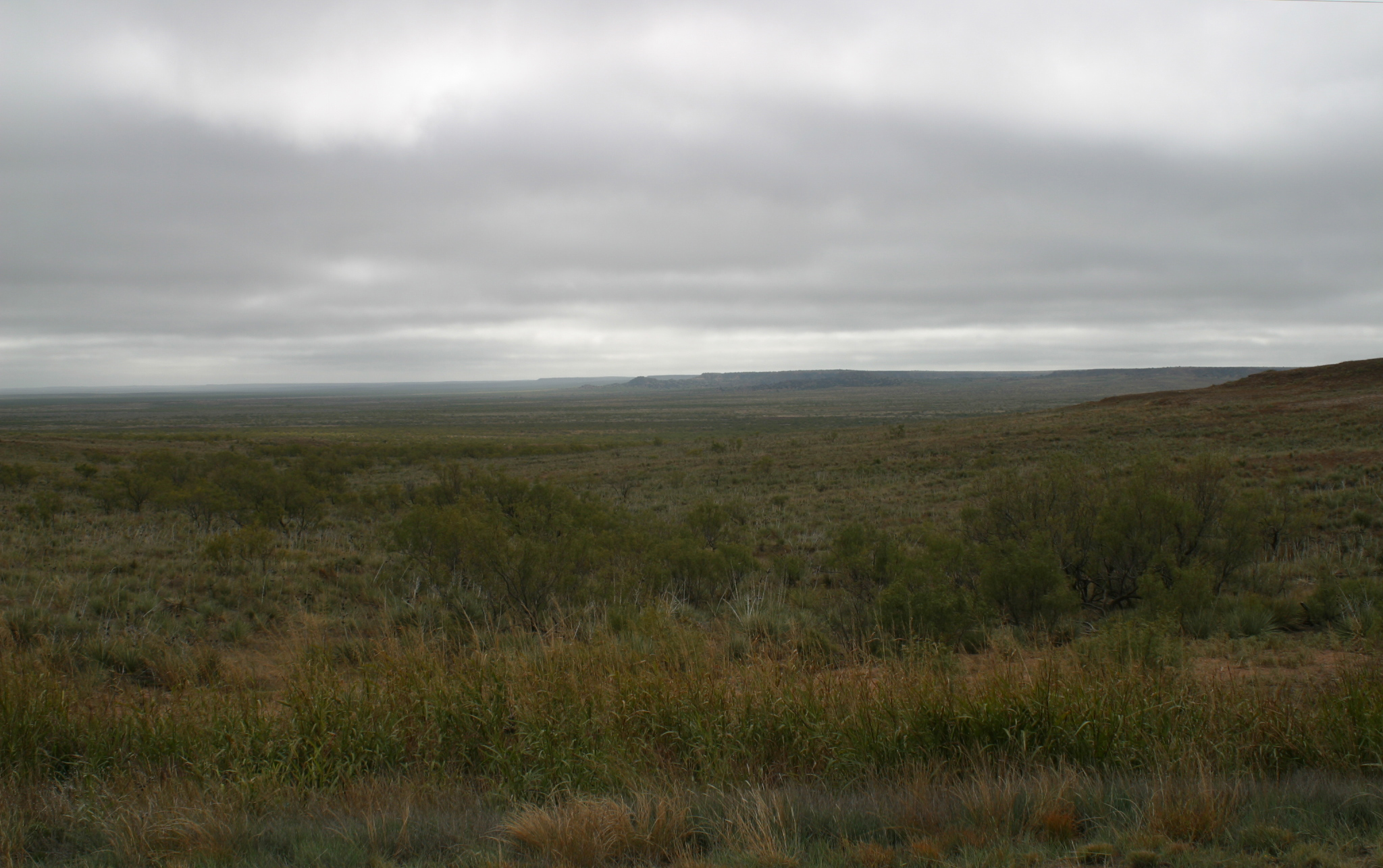
Oldham County ranch land in the Canadian River Valley between Vega and Dalhart (2002)

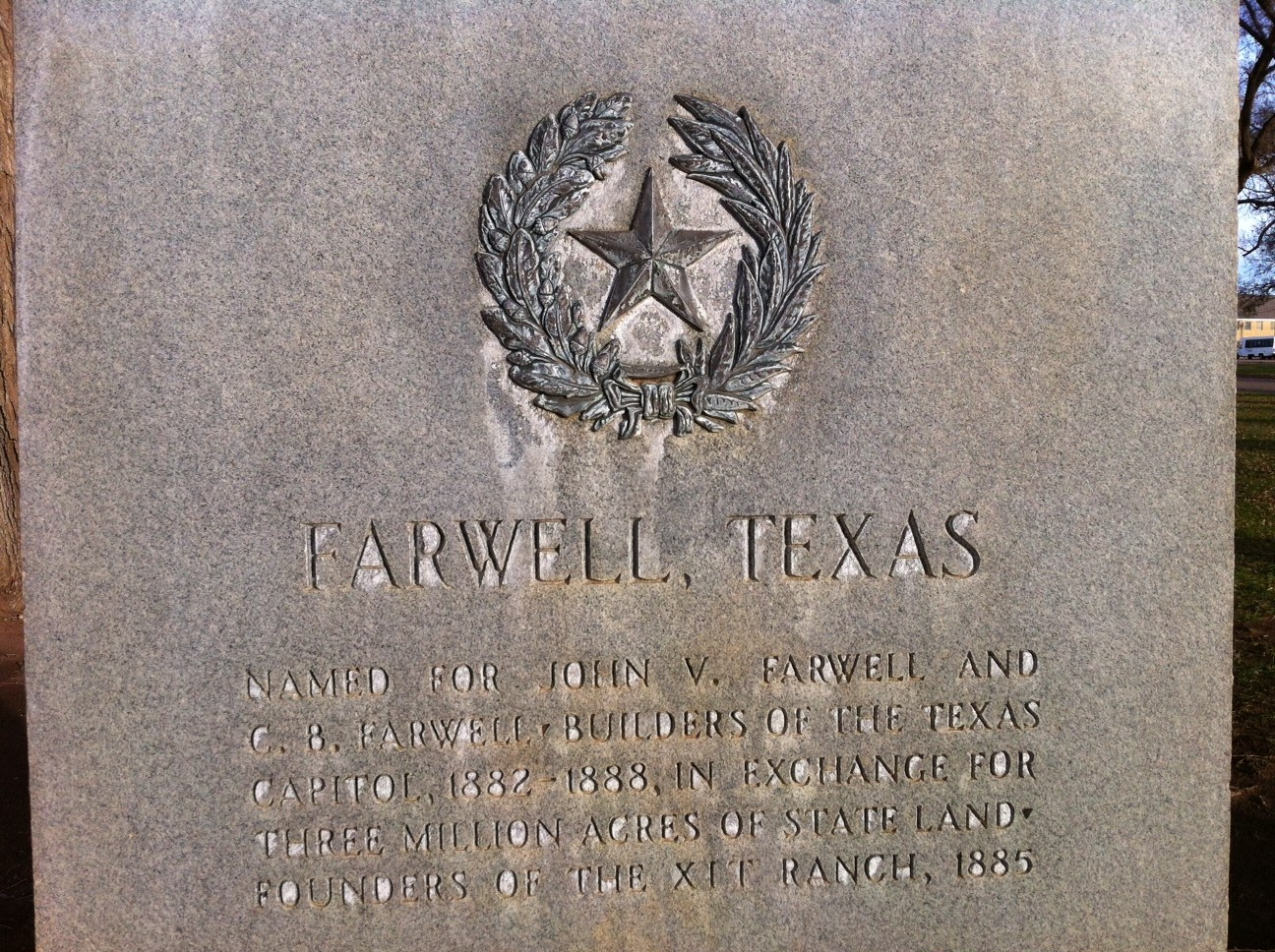
Monument in Farwell, Texas, noting the Farwell brothers as receiving the land which became the XIT in exchange for constructing the Texas State Capitol building

== See also ==
- Ira Aten
- Patrick H. Landergin
