= Patrick H. Landergin =

American politician (1854–1929)

- Born: March 3, 1854; Oxford, New York, U.S.
- Died: March 4, 1929 (aged 75); Amarillo, Texas, U.S.
- Resting place: Llano Cemetery, Amarillo, Texas, U.S.
- Occupations: Rancher, politician, banker
- Political party: Democratic Party
- Spouse: Mary Louisa Corbin
- Children: 2

Patrick H. Landergin (March 3, 1854 – March 4, 1929) was an American politician, rancher, banker and philanthropist. He served as a Democratic member of the Kansas House of Representatives in 1903. With his brother John, he was the co-owner of the LS Ranch and later purchased 100,000 acres of the XIT Ranch in Texas. By the time of his death, he was "one of the best known cattlemen in the United States."

== Early life ==
Landergin was born on March 3, 1854, in Oxford, New York. His parents were immigrants from Ireland. He had a brother, John. He grew up on a farm in New York state.

== Career ==
Landergin drove cattle on the Chisholm Trail in 1871. Shortly after, he raised cattle with his brother near Coffeyville, Kansas, and later Greenwood County, Kansas.

Landergin joined the Democratic Party. He was elected as a member of the Kansas House of Representatives in 1903.

By 1907, Landergin and his brother purchased 100,000 acres from the LS Ranch in Texas. They purchased the XIT Ranch in 1916. When his brother died in 1923, Landergin became the sole proprietor of their ranching interests. One of his sons-in-law, Grady Nobles, worked on his ranches. Meanwhile, Landergin served as the President of the Kansas National Livestock Association and the Texas and Southwestern Cattle Raisers Association. Additionally, he served as the President of the Panhandle Livestock Association.

Landergin served as the President of the First State Bank of Vega, Texas. He also served on the board of directors of the Eureka Bank of Eureka, Kansas. Additionally, he served on the board of directors of the Glen Rio Oil Company.

== Philanthropy ==
Landergin was elected as the chairman of the Board of Trustees of Fairmount College, later known as Wichita State University, in 1914.

By 1917, Landergin served on the board of directors of the Red Cross of Amarillo. Additionally, he served on the board of directors of the Llano Cemetery Association. He was also a member of the Rotary Club. Additionally, he donated the bells of the First Presbyterian Church of Amarillo.

== Personal life and legacy ==
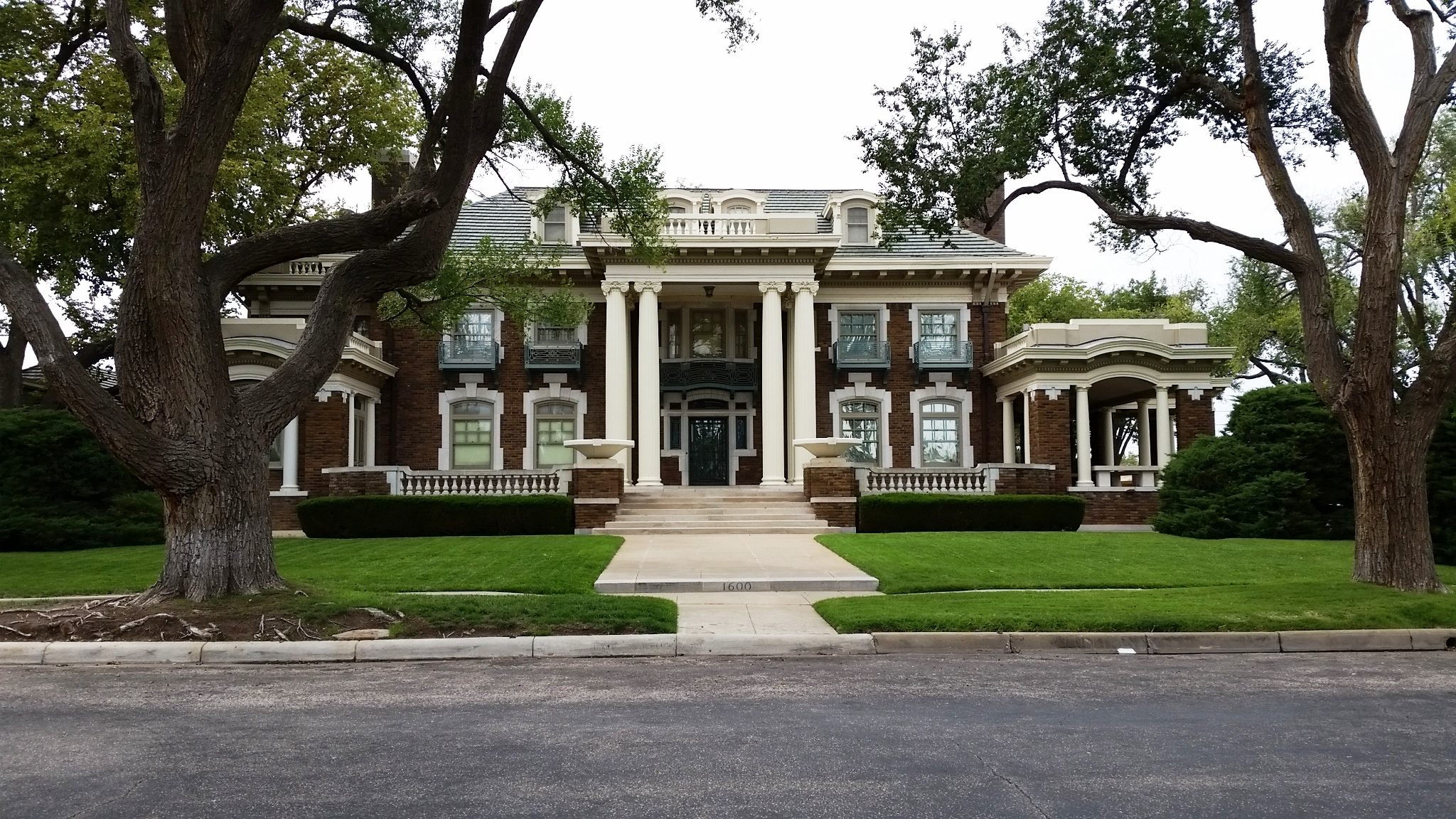
The Landergin-Harrington House in Amarillo, Texas.

Landergin married Mary Louisa Corbin on November 25, 1886. They had two daughters, Alice and Harriet. They built a mansion at 1600 Polk Street in Amarillo, Texas. Landergin was widowed in 1913.

Landergin was Presbyterian.

Landergin died of influenza on March 4, 1929, aged 75, and was buried at the Llano Cemetery in Amarillo. By the time of his death, he was "one of the best known cattlemen in the United States."

Landergin's mansion in Amarillo is listed on the National Register of Historic Places.
