= West Texas Chamber of Commerce =

The West Texas Chamber of Commerce was the chamber of commerce for West Texas from 1918 to 1988.

== History ==
The West Texas Chamber of Commerce was founded in Fort Worth, Texas in December 1918. Its first convention took place in Mineral Wells, Texas in 1919. Its first chairman was Colonel Cornelius T. Herring, a rancher, banker and hotelier. It published West Texas Today.

It merged with the Texas Chamber of Commerce in Austin, Texas in 1988.
