= Murder of Angela Samota =

1984 murder in Texas, U.S.

Angela Samota
- Born: Angela Marie Samota; September 19, 1964; Alameda, California, U.S.
- Died: October 13, 1984 (aged 20); Dallas, Texas, U.S.
- Cause of death: Multiple knife wounds to the heart
- Resting place: Llano Cemetery, Amarillo, Texas
- Known for: Victim of rape and murder

The murder of Angela Samota occurred on October 13, 1984, when the 20-year-old American college student was attacked in her apartment, raped, and killed.

The case remained unsolved until DNA evidence surfaced in the 2000s, identifying Donald Andrew Bess, Jr. as the suspect in her death. He was already in prison on rape charges in a separate case. Bess was tried, convicted and sentenced to death in the Samota case, but died in prison before the death sentence was executed.

== Background ==
Angela "Angie" Marie Samota was born on September 19, 1964, in Alameda, California, the youngest of five siblings, to father Frank Samota, who died almost a year after her birth, and mother Betty Ruth Samota, née Train. She enrolled at the Southern Methodist University in Dallas, Texas and was a part of the Zeta Tau Alpha sorority. She was studying computer science and electrical engineering and staying at a condo apartment her parents had bought for her, in which she soon had a close friend, Sheila Wysocki, move in as a guest. They had been room mates at the SMU as freshmen.

== Assault ==
On the night of October 12, 1984, Samota and two friends, one male and one female, went to the State Fair of Texas. Samota's boyfriend did not join them because, according to the subsequent police report, he was working in construction and said he had to get up early the following morning. The three friends went to the recently opened, popular Rio Room dance club and stayed there until "after midnight." According to subsequent testimony of the male who accompanied the two girls, Samota "was going [from] table to table, talking to people" and seemed like "she knew everyone."

Afterward, Samota drove her two companions to their homes, first dropping off the male at around 1 a.m. at his apartment on Matilda Street, in Lower Greenville, which was a five-minute walk from Samota's condo on Amesbury Drive, and then the female. The man later testified that, when he returned home, "he went to bed and fell asleep."

Samota next went by her boyfriend's apartment to say goodnight and returned to her place. The boyfriend subsequently stated that at approximately 1:45 a.m. he got a call from Samota, who told him there was a man in her condo who asked her to use the phone and the bathroom. He didn't know if the man was already there when she got home or if she allowed him to come in. "Talk to me," Samota reportedly said to her boyfriend, then said she would call "right back" and hung up. When she did not call back, the boyfriend phoned her, and no one answered. He drove to her condo, but there was no response when he knocked on the door, which was locked. He had with him an early-generation mobile phone, provided for his construction job, so he called information, who connected him to the police.

Police officers arrived at 2:17 a.m. and broke through the door. They discovered Samota's dead, bloody, and naked body on the bed. The autopsy showed that the victim had been raped and then stabbed eighteen times in the chest, dying from the wounds to her heart.

== Investigation and arrest ==
For a long period of time, the police reportedly suspected an architect who was 23 years old at the time and living in a Lower Greenville apartment. He was the man who, the night of the murder, had gone out with Samota and another girl. The victim's boyfriend was reportedly also a suspect. The case remained unsolved until 2008.

In 2006, then-Dallas police detective Linda Crum, tasked with the case, used the DNA evidence from blood, semen, and fingernail samples to try to find a match among persons with a criminal record. In 2008, the results pointed to a Donald Bess who, at the time of Samota's murder, was on parole while serving a 25-year sentence.

== Claims by friend ==
Sheila Wysocki, the former SMU student and roommate with Samota, subsequently stated that the cold case was re-opened only because she kept "badgering" the police until "they were so sick and tired of" her that they assigned detective Crum to re-examine it. Wysocki credits the fact that she became a licensed private investigator in her desire to assist in solving Samota's murder. The police initially had stated the rape kit collected at the crime scene, which contained the incriminating DNA evidence, had been lost "in the [Dallas] floods."

== Legal process ==
The defendant in the 2010 trial for the sexual assault and murder of Angela Samota was already in prison, serving a life sentence. Donald Andrew Bess Jr. (born September 1, 1948, in Jefferson County, Arkansas), had been previously convicted in 1978 for aggravated sexual assault and aggravated kidnapping. He had been sentenced to 25 years in prison but, since 1984, he was out on parole when, according to the court's verdict, he raped and murdered Samota.

In 1985, in a case unrelated to and after Samota's murder, Bess was sentenced in Harris County, Texas, to life imprisonment for one count of aggravated rape, one count of aggravated kidnapping and one count of sexual assault.

During the punishment phase of the Samota case trial, in 2010, various women came forward and testified that they had also been raped by Bess. The defendant's ex-wife testified that he had physically abused her and their child during their marriage. They had wed in 1969 and divorced three years later. Against Bess testified also the two women who had survived his assaults in 1978 and 1985, respectively. After the witnesses' testimony, Bess suffered a heart attack and was temporarily transferred to and kept under guard in the hospital, which paused the proceedings by three days.

On the basis of the DNA match, Bess was found guilty by the jury for first degree murder, rape, and all the other charges, and, on June 8, 2010, he received the death sentence. On March 6, 2013, the appeal filed by Bess was rejected and the judgment of the trial court was affirmed. On August 13, 2013, a certiorari petition was filed to the U.S. Supreme Court, and was denied on January 13, 2014. In April 2016, the Texas Court of Criminal Appeals rejected an appeal submitted by Bess, thus upholding irrevocably the findings of the Dallas County trial court.

Donald Bess was transferred to the Allan B. Polunsky Unit death row, where, a few years later, on October 8, 2022, he died from a heart attack, while awaiting execution.

Angela Samota's mother, Betty Ruth, had died in 2021, at 96 years old, having witnessed the capture and sentencing of her daughter's killer.

== Aftermath ==
The true crime series Dateline NBC produced an hour-long program covering the Samota case. Τitled In the Middle of the Night, it originally aired on NBC on June 8, 2012.

In 2016, the Dallas Police Department re-established a unit dedicated to researching cold cases. In a 2021 Investigation Discovery episode, titled "Betrayed: Co-ed Killer", the case and the subsequent identification of Samota's murderer were re-enacted.

Samota's body is buried in the Llano Cemetery, Amarillo, Texas. Sheila Wysocki lives in Tennessee and is still a practicing private investigator.

== See also ==
- Cold case
- Recidivism
