= Llano Cemetery Historic District =

- U.S. National Register of Historic Places
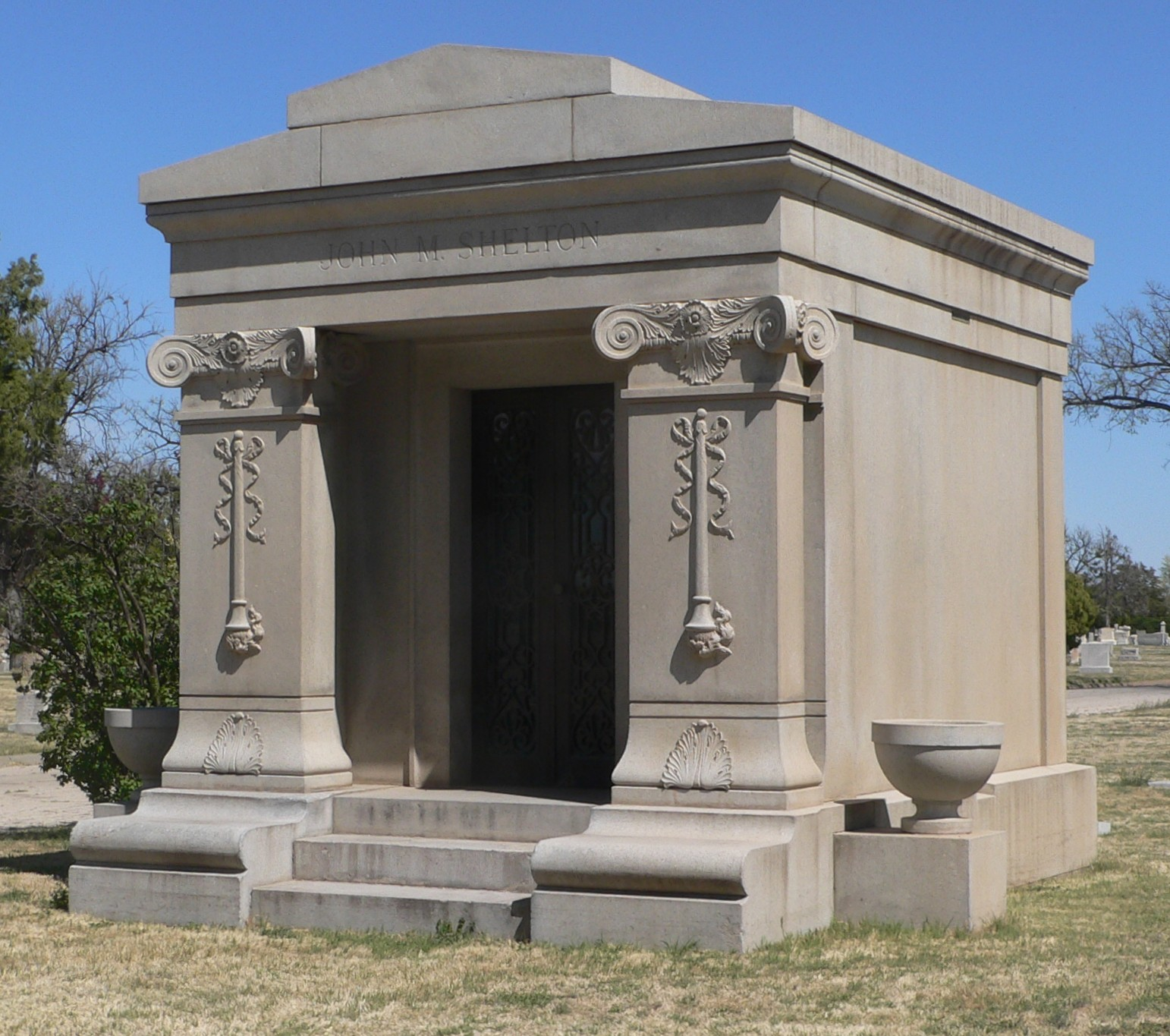
- Shelton mausoleum in Llano Cemetery

- Location within Texas Location within the United States
- Location: 2900 South Hayes St. Amarillo, Texas
- Coordinates: 35°10′50″N 101°49′45″W
- Built: 1927
- Built by: Various
- Architect: Various
- Architectural style: Pueblo
- NRHP reference No.: 92000584
- Added to NRHP: May 21, 1992

The Llano Cemetery Historic District is a historic district in Amarillo, Texas. The Llano Cemetery makes up the majority of the district on S Hayes St. The Llano Pantheon Mausoleum in the center of the cemetery was constructed in 1927.

The building was added to the National Register of Historic Places on May 21, 1992.

== Notable burials ==
- Blair Cherry (1901–1966), American football coach
- Lawrence Michael De Falco (1915–1979), bishop
- Cornelius T. Herring (1849–1931), rancher and hotelier
- Laurence Julius FitzSimon (1895–1958), bishop
- Rick Husband (1957–2003), astronaut, commander of STS-107 which ended when the Space Shuttle Columbia disintegrated upon re-entry, killing all 7 astronauts on board
- John Marvin Jones (1882–1976), politician
- Mieczyslaw Pianowski, Polish-American dancer and choreographer
- George H. Quarterman (1906–2002), bishop
- Mary Lou Robinson (1926–2019), United States district judge
- Chris Romero (1966–2021), professional wrestler
- Ricky Romero (1931–2006), professional wrestler
- Angela Samota (1964–1984), murder victim
- Frank Saucier (1926–2025), professional baseball player
- Eugene Cecil Seaman (1881–1950), bishop
- John M. Shelton (1853–1923), rancher and banker
- Terry Stafford (1941–1996), singer
- Thomas M. Watlington (1904–1990), US Army major general

== See also ==
- National Register of Historic Places listings in Randall County, Texas
