= Charles Higbee Bridges =

United States Army general (1873–1948)

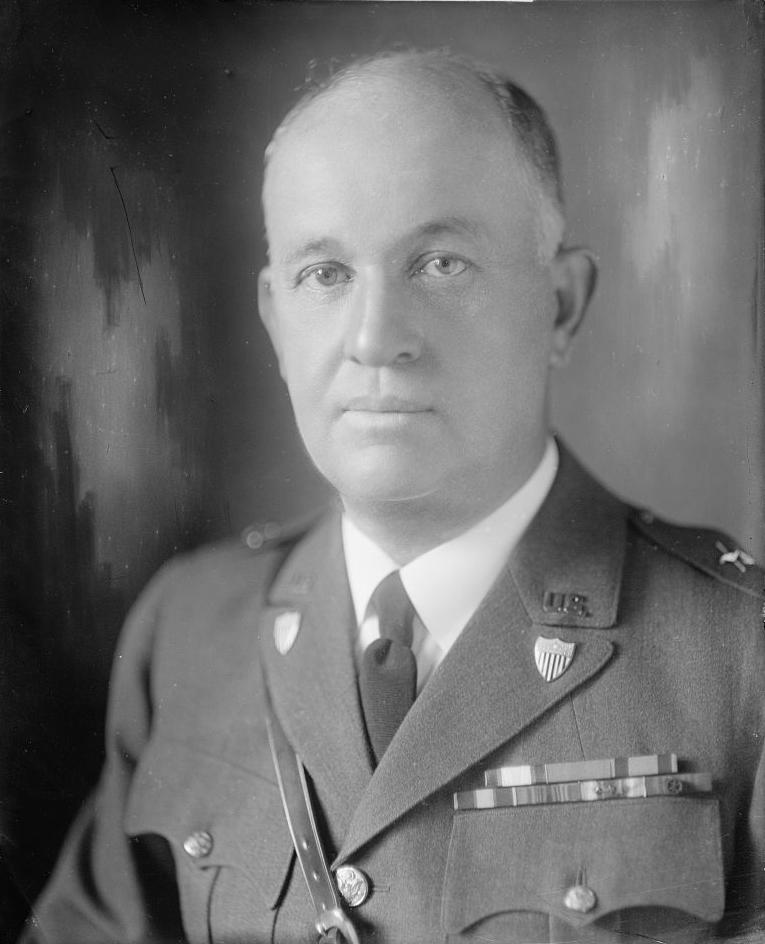
- Born: March 1, 1873; Illinois, U.S.
- Died: September 11, 1948 (aged 75); Sandwich, Massachusetts, U.S.
- Burial place: Arlington National Cemetery, Virginia, United States
- Relatives: Sadie Marie Bridges (wife)
- Military career
- Allegiance: United States
- Branch: United States Army
- Service years: 1897–1933
- Rank: Major General
- Unit: Infantry Branch
- Commands: Adjutant General of the U.S. Army
- Awards: Distinguished Service Medal

Charles Higbee Bridges (March 1, 1873 – September 11, 1948) was an American military officer who was a major general and Adjutant General of the United States Army from 1928 to 1933.

== Biography ==
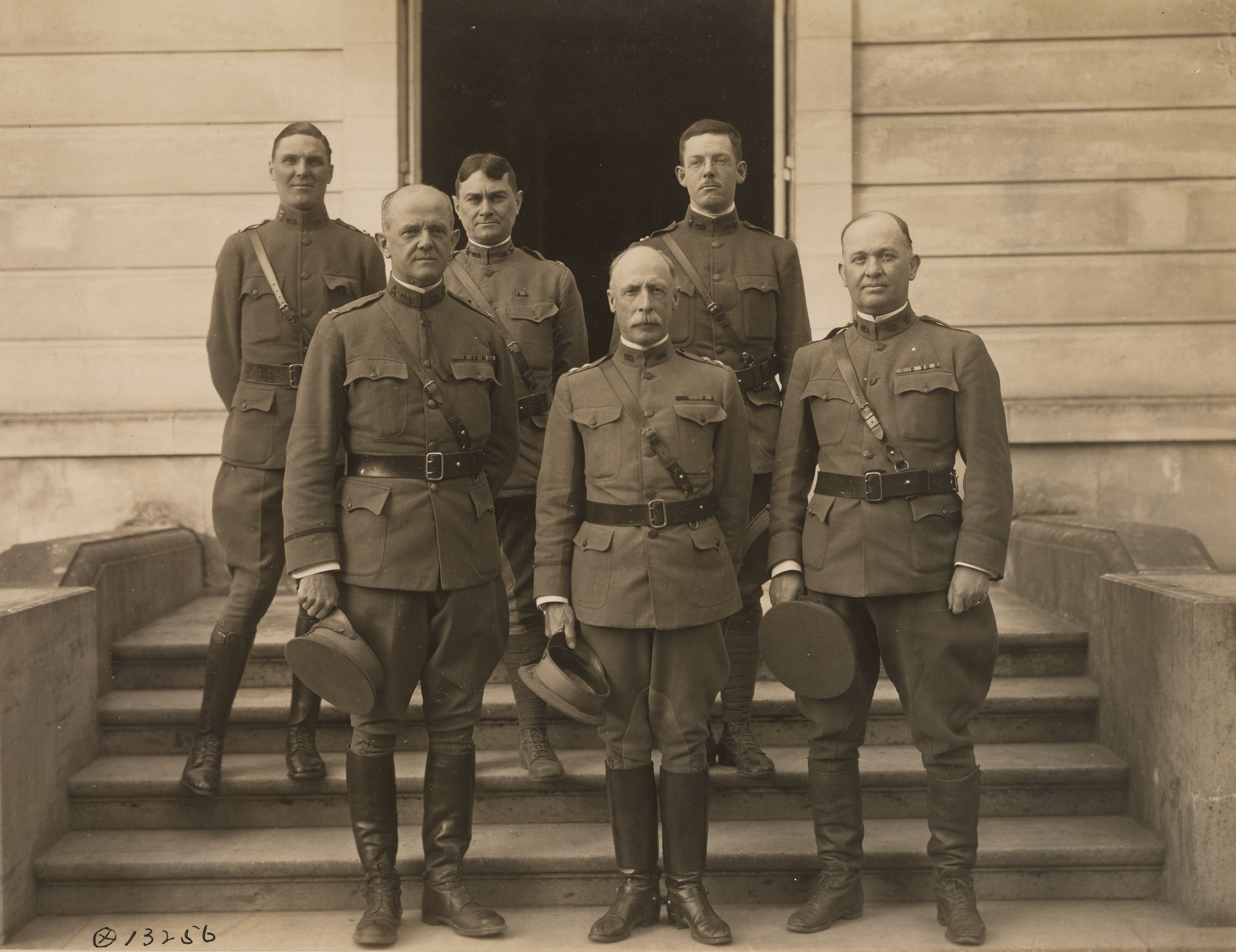
Major General Omar Bundy (center), commander of the U.S. 2nd Division, along with members of his divisional staff, pictured here at Chaumont-en-Vexin, France, May 28, 1918. To Bundy's left is Colonel Charles H. Bridges, the division's G-1.

Charles H. Bridges was born and raised in Illinois. He entered the United States Military Academy on 21 June 1893 and graduated as a Second Lieutenant in the 6th Infantry on 11 June 1897. He was transferred to the 22nd Infantry on 8 March 1898.

Bridges having fought at San Juan and the siege of Santiago in Cuba, then participated in the Philippine-American War, where he was the custodian for four months of the rebel leader Aguinaldo. He was promoted to First Lieutenant on 2 March 1899 and to captain in the 15th Infantry on 28 June 1902.

During First World War, he went to France as the Inspector General of the 2nd Division and later became its G-1 (Assistant Chief of Staff for Personnel) until transferred as G-1 to the VI Army Corps in July 1918. For his service in the war he received the Army Distinguished Service Medal and the French Legion of Honor. The citation for his Army DSM reads:

The President of the United States of America, authorized by Act of Congress, July 9, 1918, takes pleasure in presenting the Army Distinguished Service Medal to Colonel (Infantry) Charles Higbee Bridges, United States Army, for exceptionally meritorious and distinguished services to the Government of the United States, in a duty of great responsibility during World War I during World War I. As Assistant Chief of Staff, First Section of the 2d Division, and later as Assistant Chief of Staff, First Section of the 6th Army Corps, Colonel Bridges performed creditably duties of great importance in connection with the Services of Supply, communication, and the movements of troops of his units, rendering services of value to the American Expeditionary Forces.

In 1928, he became the Adjutant General of the U.S. Army. After 40 years of service he retired in 1933 as a Major General. He died in 1948 in Sandwich, Massachusetts on Cape Cod. He was buried in Arlington National Cemetery with his wife Sadie Marie (1879–1969).

He was married to Sadie Marie Bridges (1879–1969).

== Awards ==
- Distinguished Service Medal
- Indian Campaign Medal
- Spanish Campaign Medal
- Philippine Campaign Medal
- Mexican Border Service Medal
- Victory Medal
- Officer, Legion of Honor (France)

== See also ==
- List of Adjutant Generals of the U.S. Army

Military offices
Preceded by Lutz Wahl	Adjutant General of the U. S. Army; December 31, 1928-March 1, 1933	Succeeded by James F. McKinley
