= General Brett =

General Brett may refer to:

- Devol Brett (1923–2010), U.S. Air Force lieutenant general
- George Brett (general) (1886–1963), U.S. Army Air Forces lieutenant general
- Lloyd Milton Brett (1856–1927), U.S. Army brigadier general
- Sereno E. Brett (1891–1952), U.S. Army brigadier general
