= List of major generals in the United States Regular Army before 1 July 1920 =

This is a complete list of major generals in the United States Regular Army before July 1, 1920.

For most of the 19th and early 20th centuries, the rank of major general was the highest possible in the Regular Army. It was also one of the rarest: until 1915, there were at most eight major generals on active duty at any given time. Even when the Army expanded during times of war, the number of Regular Army major generals remained relatively constant because instead of increasing the permanent military establishment to meet transient wartime needs, the Regular Army was used as a cadre for a vast non-permanent establishment of volunteer and conscript forces. Many of the most famous major generals of the American Civil War held that rank only in the volunteer service, and reverted to a much lower permanent grade in the Regular Army when the volunteer force was disbanded after the war.

The number of Regular Army major generals increased dramatically when the Army was reorganized after World War I. The new peacetime establishment maintained a total of 34 active-duty major generals, including 21 major generals of the line and 13 major generals of the staff. The reorganization took effect on July 1, 1920.

== Taxonomy ==
Historically, the United States Army included two components: the permanently established Regular Army, which constituted the peacetime force; and, during time of war, a much larger non-permanent establishment comprising various volunteer, conscript, and federalized state forces.

There were three types of major generals in the Regular Army:

- A major general of the line was an officer who was commissioned in the permanent grade of major general and therefore maintained that rank regardless of assignment.
- A major general of the staff was an officer who held the temporary rank of major general only while occupying an office designated by statute to carry that rank, and who reverted to a lower permanent grade upon relinquishing that office.
- An emergency major general was an officer whose Regular Army rank of major general was authorized only during the World War I emergency, which expired on June 30, 1920.

Major generals in the non-permanent or non-federal establishments included the following:

- A major general of militia was appointed or elected to that rank in one of the state militia forces.
- A major general of levies was appointed to that rank in the six-month levies raised during the Northwest Indian War.
- A major general of volunteers was appointed to that rank in the United States Volunteers during the War of 1812, the Mexican War, the Civil War, or the Spanish–American War.
- A major general in the Provisional Army was appointed to that rank in the Provisional Army authorized during the Quasi-War.
- A major general in the National Guard was appointed to that rank in one of the state National Guard forces.
- A major general in the National Army was appointed to that rank in the National Army during World War I before August 7, 1918, when the Regular Army, the National Army, and the federalized National Guard were unified into a single United States Army.
- A temporary major general was appointed to that rank in the non-permanent establishment of the unified United States Army after August 7, 1918.

In addition, honorary brevet ranks of major general were conferred in several organizations in recognition of gallant wartime conduct.

- A brevet major general was awarded that brevet rank in the Regular Army, typically for actions in the War of 1812, the Mexican War, or the Civil War.
- A brevet major general of volunteers was awarded that brevet rank in the United States Volunteers, typically for actions in the Civil War or the Spanish–American War.
- A brevet major general of militia was awarded that brevet rank in one of the state militia forces.

== List of Regular Army major generals before July 1, 1920 ==
The following list of major generals includes all officers appointed to that rank in the line or staff of the Regular Army prior to July 1, 1920, including emergency major generals. It does not include officers who held that rank solely by brevet or in the non-permanent or non-federal establishment, such as major generals of militia or volunteers, major generals in the National Guard or National Army, or temporary major generals.

Entries are indexed by the numerical order in which each officer was appointed to that rank while on active duty, or by an asterisk (*) if the officer did not serve in that rank while on active duty. Each entry lists the officer's name; date of rank; date the officer vacated the active-duty rank; number of years on active duty as major general (Yrs); and other biographical notes.

	Name	Date of rank	Date vacated	Yrs	Notes
1	Arthur St. Clair	4 Mar 1791	5 Mar 1792	1	(1736–1818)
2	Anthony Wayne	5 Mar 1792	15 Dec 1796	5	(1745–1796) Awarded Congressional Gold Medal, 1779.
3	Alexander Hamilton	19 Jul 1798	15 Jun 1800	2	(1755–1804) Inspector General with rank of major general, 19 Jul 1798–15 Jun 1800.
4	Charles C. Pinckney	19 Jul 1798	15 Jun 1800	2	(1746–1825)
5	John Wilkins Jr.	1 Jun 1799	1 Jun 1802	3	(1761–1816) The act of March 3, 1799 provided for a Quartermaster General with rank of major general, but Wilkins was not appointed to that rank and served in the position as a civilian. 1 Jun 1799–1 Jun 1802.
6	Henry Dearborn	27 Jan 1812	15 Jun 1815	3	(1751–1829) Major general of Massachusetts militia, 1789.
7	Thomas Pinckney	27 Mar 1812	15 Jun 1815	3	(1750–1828)
8	James Wilkinson	2 Mar 1813	15 Jun 1815	2	(1757–1825)
9	Wade Hampton	2 Mar 1813	6 Apr 1814	1	(1752–1835)
10	Morgan Lewis	2 Mar 1813	15 Jun 1815	2	(1754–1844)
11	William Henry Harrison	2 Mar 1813	31 May 1814	1	(1773–1841) Brevet major general of Kentucky militia, 20 Aug 1812–31 Aug 1812. Awarded Thanks of Congress and Congressional Gold Medal, 1818.
12	George Izard	24 Jan 1814	15 Jun 1815	1	(1776–1828)
13	Jacob J. Brown	24 Jan 1814	24 Feb 1828	14	(1775–1828) Major general of New York militia, 1812. Awarded Thanks of Congress and Congressional Gold Medal, 1814.
14	Andrew Jackson	31 May 1814	1 Jun 1821	7	(1767–1845) Major general of Tennessee militia, 1 Apr 1803–30 May 1814; major general of volunteers, 10 Dec 1812–30 May 1814. Awarded Thanks of Congress and Congressional Gold Medal, 1815.
15	Alexander Macomb	24 May 1828	25 Jun 1841	13	(1782–1841) Brevet major general, 11 Sep 1814. Awarded Thanks of Congress and Congressional Gold Medal, 1814.
16	Winfield Scott	25 Jun 1841	1 Nov 1861	20	(1786–1866) Brevet major general, 25 Jul 1814; brevet lieutenant general, 29 Mar 1847. Awarded Congressional Gold Medal, 1814; Thanks of Congress and Congressional Gold Medal, 1848.
17	Zachary Taylor	29 Jun 1846	31 Jan 1849	3	(1784–1850) Brevet major general, 28 May 1846. Awarded Thanks of Congress and Congressional Gold Medal, 1846, 1847, and 1848.
18	Gideon J. Pillow	13 Apr 1847	20 Jul 1848	1	(1806–1878)
19	John A. Quitman	14 Apr 1847	20 Jul 1848	1	(1799–1858) Brevet major general, 23 Sep 1846. Awarded Congressional Sword, 1847.
20	George B. McClellan	14 May 1861	8 Nov 1864	3	(1826–1885) Major general of Ohio militia, 23 Apr 1861–14 May 1861.
21	John C. Frémont	14 May 1861	4 Jun 1864	3	(1813–1890)
22	Henry W. Halleck	19 Aug 1861	9 Jan 1872	10	(1815–1872) Major general of California militia, 1860–19 Aug 1861; major general of Missouri militia, 25 Nov 1861–23 Jul 1862.
23	John E. Wool	16 May 1862	1 Aug 1863	1	(1784–1869) Promoted Brigadier General April 29, 1841, Breveted major general, 23 Feb 1847. Awarded Thanks of Congress and Congressional Sword, 1854. Promoted Major General regular army May 16, 1862, retired August 1, 1863, died November 10, 1869.
24	Ulysses S. Grant	4 Jul 1863	2 Mar 1864	1	(1822–1885) Major general of volunteers, 16 Feb 1862–4 Jul 1863. Promoted to lieutenant general, 2 Mar 1864; to general, 25 Jul 1866. Awarded Thanks of Congress and Congressional Gold Medal, 1863.
25	William T. Sherman	12 Aug 1864	25 Jul 1866	2	(1820–1891) Major general of California militia, 1856; major general of volunteers, 1 May 1862–12 Aug 1864. Promoted to lieutenant general, 25 Jul 1866; to general, 4 Mar 1869. Awarded Thanks of Congress, 1864.
26	George G. Meade	18 Aug 1864	6 Nov 1872	8	(1815–1872) Major general of volunteers, 29 Nov 1862–18 Aug 1864. Awarded Thanks of Congress, 1864 and 1865.
27	Philip H. Sheridan	8 Nov 1864	4 Mar 1869	4	(1831–1888) Major general of volunteers, 31 Dec 1862–8 Nov 1864. Promoted to lieutenant general, 4 Mar 1869; to general, 1 Jun 1888. Awarded Thanks of Congress, 1865.
28	George H. Thomas	15 Dec 1864	28 Mar 1870	5	(1816–1870) Major general of volunteers, 25 Apr 1862–15 Dec 1864. Awarded Thanks of Congress, 1865.
29	Winfield S. Hancock	26 Jul 1866	9 Feb 1886	20	(1824–1886) Major general of volunteers, 29 Nov 1862–26 Jul 1866. Brevet major general, 13 Mar 1865. Awarded Thanks of Congress, 1866.
*	James B. Ricketts	3 Jan 1867	(none)	0	(1817–1887) Brevet major general, 13 Mar 1865.
*	Eli Long	16 Aug 1867	(none)	0	(1837–1903) Reduced to brigadier general on the retired list, 3 Mar 1875. Brevet major general, 13 Mar 1865.
*	Richard W. Johnson	12 Oct 1867	(none)	0	(1827–1897) Reduced to brigadier general on the retired list, 3 Mar 1875. Brevet major general of volunteers, 13 Mar 1865; brevet major general, 13 Mar 1865.
*	Thomas J. Wood	9 Jun 1868	(none)	0	(1823–1906) Reduced to brigadier general on the retired list, 3 Mar 1875. Major general of volunteers, 27 Jan 1865–1 Sep 1866. Brevet major general, 13 Mar 1865.
*	Joseph Hooker	15 Oct 1868	(none)	0	(1814–1879) Major general of volunteers, 5 May 1862–1 Sep 1866. Brevet major general, 13 Mar 1865. Awarded Thanks of Congress, 1864.
*	Samuel P. Heintzelman	22 Feb 1869	(none)	0	(1805–1880) Major general of volunteers, 5 May 1862–24 Aug 1865. Brevet major general, 13 Mar 1865.
30	John M. Schofield	4 Mar 1869	8 Feb 1895	26	(1831–1906) Promoted to lieutenant general, 8 Feb 1895. Major general of Missouri militia, 8 Oct 1862–29 Nov 1862; major general of volunteers, 29 Nov 1862–1 Sep 1866. Brevet major general, 13 Mar 1865. Awarded Medal of Honor, 1861.
*	Daniel E. Sickles	14 Apr 1869	(none)	0	(1819–1914) Major general of volunteers, 29 Nov 1862–1 Jan 1868. Brevet major general, 2 Mar 1867. Awarded Medal of Honor, 1863.
*	John C. Robinson	6 May 1869	(none)	0	(1817–1897) Brevet major general of volunteers, 27 Jun 1864; brevet major general, 13 Mar 1865. Awarded Medal of Honor, 1864.
*	Samuel S. Carroll	9 Jun 1869	(none)	0	(1832–1893) Brevet major general of volunteers, 13 Mar 1865; brevet major general, 13 Mar 1865.
*	Thomas W. Sherman	31 Dec 1870	(none)	0	(1813–1879) Brevet major general of volunteers, 13 Mar 1865; brevet major general, 13 Mar 1865.
*	George L. Hartsuff	29 Jun 1871	(none)	0	(1830–1874) Major general of volunteers, 29 Nov 1862–24 Aug 1865. Brevet major general, 13 Mar 1865.
31	Irvin McDowell	25 Nov 1872	15 Oct 1882	10	(1818–1885) Major general of volunteers, 14 Mar 1862–1 Sep 1866. Brevet major general, 13 Mar 1865.
*	Edward O. C. Ord	28 Jan 1881	(none)	0	(1830–1883) Major general of volunteers, 2 May 1862–1 Sep 1866. Brevet major general, 13 Mar 1865.
32	John Pope	26 Oct 1882	16 Mar 1886	3	(1822–1892) Major general of volunteers, 21 Mar 1862–1 Sep 1866. Brevet major general, 13 Mar 1865.
33	Alfred H. Terry	3 Mar 1886	5 Apr 1888	2	(1827–1890) Major general of volunteers, 15 Jan 1865–1 Sep 1866. Brevet major general of volunteers, 26 Aug 1864; brevet major general, 13 Mar 1865. Awarded Thanks of Congress, 1865.
34	Oliver O. Howard	19 Mar 1886	8 Nov 1894	9	(1830–1909) Major general of volunteers, 29 Nov 1862–1 Jan 1869. Brevet major general, 13 Mar 1865. Awarded Medal of Honor, 1862; Thanks of Congress, 1864.
35	George Crook	6 Apr 1888	21 Mar 1890	2	(1828–1890) Major general of volunteers, 21 Oct 1864–15 Jan 1866. Brevet major general of volunteers, 18 Jul 1864; brevet major general, 13 Mar 1865. Died in office.
36	Nelson A. Miles	5 Apr 1890	2 Feb 1901	10	(1839–1925) Major general of volunteers, 21 Oct 1865–1 Sep 1866; senior major general commanding the Army with rank of lieutenant general, 6 Jun 1900–2 Feb 1901. Promoted to lieutenant general, 2 Feb 1901. Brevet major general of volunteers, 26 Aug 1864; brevet major general, 2 Mar 1867. Awarded Medal of Honor, 1863.
37	Alexander M. McCook	9 Nov 1894	22 Apr 1895	0	(1831–1903) Major general of volunteers, 17 Jul 1862–21 Oct 1865. Brevet major general, 13 Mar 1865.
38	Thomas H. Ruger	8 Feb 1895	2 Apr 1897	2	(1833–1907) Brevet major general of volunteers, 30 Nov 1864.
39	Wesley Merritt	25 Apr 1895	16 Jun 1900	5	(1836–1910) Major general of volunteers, 1 Apr 1865–1 Feb 1866. Brevet major general of volunteers, 19 Oct 1864; brevet major general, 13 Mar 1865.
40	Frank Wheaton	2 Apr 1897	9 May 1897	0	(1833–1903) Brevet major general of volunteers, 19 Oct 1864; brevet major general, 13 Mar 1865.
41	James W. Forsyth	11 May 1897	14 May 1897	0	(1835–1906)
42	Zenas R. Bliss	14 May 1897	22 May 1897	0	(1835–1900) Awarded Medal of Honor, 1862.
43	John R. Brooke	22 May 1897	21 Jul 1902	5	(1838–1926) Brevet major general of volunteers, 1 Aug 1864.
44	Henry C. Corbin	6 Jun 1900	15 Apr 1906	6	(1842–1909) Adjutant General with rank of major general, 6 Jun 1900–15 Apr 1906. Promoted to lieutenant general, 15 Apr 1906.
45	Elwell S. Otis	16 Jun 1900	25 Mar 1902	2	(1838–1909) Major general of volunteers, 4 May 1898–16 Jun 1900. Brevet major general, 4 Feb 1899.
46	Samuel B. M. Young	2 Feb 1901	8 Aug 1903	3	(1840–1924) Major general of volunteers, 8 Jul 1898–13 Apr 1899. Promoted to lieutenant general, 8 Aug 1903.
47	Adna R. Chaffee	4 Feb 1901	9 Jan 1904	3	(1842–1914) Major general of volunteers, 8 Jul 1898–13 Apr 1899 and 19 Jul 1900–4 Feb 1901. Promoted to lieutenant general, 9 Jan 1904.
48	Arthur MacArthur Jr.	5 Feb 1901	15 Sep 1906	6	(1845–1912) Major general of volunteers, 13 Aug 1898–5 Feb 1901. Promoted to lieutenant general, 15 Sep 1906. Awarded Medal of Honor, 1863.
49	Loyd Wheaton	30 Mar 1901	15 Jul 1902	1	(1838–1918) Major general of volunteers, 18 Jun 1900–28 Feb 1901. Brevet major general of volunteers, 19 Jun 1899. Awarded Medal of Honor, 1865.
*	William R. Shafter	1 Jul 1901	(none)	0	(1835–1906) Major general of volunteers, 4 May 1898–30 Jun 1901. Awarded Medal of Honor, 1862.
50	Robert P. Hughes	1 Apr 1902	11 Apr 1903	1	(1839–1909)
51	John C. Bates	15 Jul 1902	1 Feb 1906	4	(1842–1919) Major general of volunteers, 8 Jul 1898–13 Apr 1899 and 2 Jan 1900–28 Feb 1901. Promoted to lieutenant general, 1 Feb 1906.
52	George W. Davis	21 Jul 1902	26 Jul 1903	1	(1839–1918)
*	Henry C. Merriam	19 Feb 1903	(none)	0	(1837–1912) Major general of volunteers, 4 May 1898–24 Feb 1899. Awarded Medal of Honor, 1865.
53	Joseph C. Breckinridge	11 Apr 1903	12 Apr 1903	0	(1842–1920) Major general of volunteers, 4 May 1898–30 Nov 1898.
54	Marshall I. Ludington	12 Apr 1903	13 Apr 1903	0	(1839–1919)
55	James F. Wade	13 Apr 1903	14 Apr 1907	4	(1843–1921) Major general of volunteers, 4 May 1898–12 Jun 1899.
56	Samuel S. Sumner	26 Jul 1903	6 Feb 1906	3	(1842–1937) Major general of volunteers, 7 Sep 1898–15 Apr 1899.
57	Leonard Wood	8 Aug 1903	5 Oct 1921	18	(1860–1927) Major general of volunteers, 7 Dec 1898–13 Apr 1899 and 5 Dec 1899–30 Jun 1901. Awarded Medal of Honor, 1886.
58	William A. Kobbé	19 Jan 1904	20 Jan 1904	0	(1840–1932)
59	Joseph P. Sanger	20 Jan 1904	21 Jan 1904	0	(1840–1926)
60	Alfred E. Bates	21 Jan 1904	22 Jan 1904	0	(1840–1909)
61	Wallace F. Randolph	22 Jan 1904	23 Jan 1904	0	(1841–1910)
62	George L. Gillespie Jr.	23 Jan 1904	17 Jun 1905	1	(1841–1913)
63	Frederick C. Ainsworth	23 Apr 1904	16 Feb 1912	8	(1852–1934) Military Secretary with rank of major general, 23 Apr 1904–5 Mar 1907; Adjutant General with rank of major general, 5 Mar 1907–16 Feb 1912.
64	John Patten Story	17 Jun 1905	19 Jun 1905	0	(1841–1915)
65	George M. Randall	19 Jun 1905	8 Oct 1905	0	(1841–1918)
66	John F. Weston	8 Oct 1905	13 Nov 1909	4	(1845–1917) Awarded Medal of Honor, 1865.
67	Frederick D. Grant	6 Feb 1906	12 Apr 1912	6	(1850–1912) Died in office.
68	Adolphus W. Greely	10 Feb 1906	27 Mar 1908	2	(1844–1935) Awarded Medal of Honor, 1935.
69	Jesse M. Lee	18 Sep 1906	2 Jan 1907	0	(1843–1926)
70	J. Franklin Bell	3 Jan 1907	8 Jan 1919	12	(1856–1919) Died in office. Awarded Medal of Honor, 1899.
71	William S. McCaskey	15 Apr 1907	2 Oct 1907	0	(1843–1914)
*	Charles F. Humphrey	1 Jul 1907	(none)	0	(1833–1907) Awarded Medal of Honor, 1877.
72	William P. Duvall	2 Oct 1907	13 Jan 1911	3	(1847–1920)
73	Charles Badger Hall	28 Mar 1908	29 Apr 1908	0	(1844–1914)
74	Thomas H. Barry	29 Apr 1908	13 Oct 1919	11	(1855–1919)
*	Alexander Mackenzie	25 May 1908	(none)	0	(1844–1921)
*	Robert M. O'Reilly	14 Jan 1909	(none)	0	(1845–1912)
75	William G. H. Carter	13 Nov 1909	19 Nov 1915	6	(1851–1925) Awarded Medal of Honor, 1881.
76	Charles L. Hodges	14 Jan 1911	13 Mar 1911	0	(1847–1911)
*	George B. Davis	14 Feb 1911	(none)	0	(1847–1914)
77	Arthur Murray	14 Mar 1911	29 Apr 1915	4	(1851–1925) first Chief of Coast Artillery 1908
78	William W. Wotherspoon	12 May 1912	16 Nov 1914	3	(1850–1921)
79	James B. Aleshire	24 Aug 1912	12 Sep 1916	4	(1856–1925) Quartermaster General with rank of major general, 24 Aug 1912–12 Sep 1916.
80	Frederick Funston	17 Nov 1914	19 Feb 1917	2	(1865–1917) Died in office. Awarded Medal of Honor, 1899.
*	Peter J. Osterhaus	4 Mar 1915	(none)	0	(1823–1917) Major general of volunteers, 23 Jul 1864–15 Jan 1866.
*	James H. Wilson	4 Mar 1915	(none)	0	(1837–1925) Major general of volunteers, 6 May 1865–8 Jan 1866 and 4 May 1898–12 Apr 1899. Brevet major general of volunteers, 6 May 1864; brevet major general, 13 Mar 1865.
*	William M. Graham Jr.	4 Mar 1915	(none)	0	(1834–1916) Major general of volunteers, 4 May 1898–30 Nov 1898.
*	Jacob F. Kent	4 Mar 1915	(none)	0	(1835–1918) Major general of volunteers, 8 Jul 1898–30 Nov 1898.
*	Frank D. Baldwin	4 Mar 1915	(none)	0	(1842–1923) Awarded Medal of Honor, 1864 and 1874.
81	George W. Goethals	4 Mar 1915	15 Nov 1916	2	(1858–1928) Awarded Thanks of Congress, 1915.
82	William C. Gorgas	4 Mar 1915	3 Oct 1918	4	(1854–1920) Surgeon General with rank of major general, 4 Mar 1915–3 Oct 1918. Awarded Thanks of Congress, 1915.
83	Hugh L. Scott	30 Apr 1915	22 Sep 1917	2	(1853–1934)
84	Tasker H. Bliss	19 Nov 1915	31 Dec 1917	2	(1853–1930) Emergency general, 6 Oct 1917–19 May 1918. Promoted to general on the retired list, 21 Jun 1930. Brevet general, 20 May 1918.
85	Albert L. Mills	3 Jun 1916	18 Sep 1916	0	(1854–1916) Died in office. Awarded Medal of Honor, 1898.
86	Erasmus M. Weaver Jr.	6 Jul 1916	23 May 1918	2	(1854–1920) Chief of Coast Artillery with rank of major general, 6 Jul 1916–23 May 1918.
*	Alexander C. M. Pennington Jr.	29 Aug 1916	(none)	0	(1838–1917)
*	Peter C. Hains	29 Aug 1916	(none)	0	(1840–1921)
*	Theodore Schwan	29 Aug 1916	(none)	0	(1841–1926) Awarded Medal of Honor, 1864.
*	Oswald H. Ernst	29 Aug 1916	(none)	0	(1842–1926)
*	John L. Clem	29 Aug 1916	(none)	0	(1851–1937)
87	Henry G. Sharpe	16 Sep 1916	1 May 1920	4	(1858–1947) Quartermaster General with rank of major general, 16 Sep 1916–12 Jul 1918. Promoted to major general of the line, 12 Jul 1918.
88	John J. Pershing	25 Sep 1916	3 Sep 1919	3	(1860–1948) Emergency general, 6 Oct 1917–3 Sep 1919. Promoted to General of the Armies of the United States, 3 Sep 1919. Awarded Thanks of Congress, 1919; Congressional Gold Medal, 1946.
*	Carroll A. Devol	31 Oct 1916	(none)	0	(1859–1930)
89	Hunter Liggett	6 Mar 1917	21 Mar 1921	4	(1857–1935) Emergency lieutenant general, 16 Oct 1918–30 Jun 1920. Promoted to lieutenant general on the retired list, 21 Jun 1930.
90	John Frank Morrison	15 May 1917	20 Dec 1921	5	(1857–1932)
91	Charles G. Morton	15 May 1917	15 Jan 1925	8	(1861–1933)
92	William L. Sibert	15 May 1917	4 Apr 1920	3	(1860–1935) Awarded Thanks of Congress, 1915.
93	Peyton C. March	23 Sep 1917	1 Nov 1921	4	(1864–1955) National Army major general, 5 Aug 1917–12 Feb 1918; emergency general, 20 May 1918–30 Jun 1920. Promoted to general on the retired list, 21 Jun 1930.
94	Henry P. McCain	6 Oct 1917	26 Aug 1918	1	(1861–1941) Adjutant General with rank of major general, 6 Oct 1917–26 Aug 1918; National Army major general, 27 Aug 1918–30 Jun 1920; retired as major general, 22 Jul 1921.
95	John L. Chamberlain	6 Oct 1917	6 Nov 1921	4	(1858–1948) Inspector General with rank of major general, 6 Oct 1917–20 Feb 1921 and 28 Mar 1921–6 Nov 1921.
96	Enoch H. Crowder	6 Oct 1917	14 Feb 1923	5	(1859–1932) Judge Advocate General with rank of major general, 6 Oct 1917–14 Feb 1923.
97	William M. Black	6 Oct 1917	31 Oct 1919	2	(1855–1933) Chief of Engineers with rank of major general, 6 Oct 1917–31 Oct 1919.
98	William Crozier	6 Oct 1917	1 Jan 1919	1	(1855–1942) Chief of Ordnance with rank of major general, 6 Oct 1917–12 Jul 1918. Promoted to major general of the line, 12 Jul 1918.
99	George O. Squier	6 Oct 1917	31 Dec 1923	6	(1865–1934) Chief Signal Officer with rank of major general, 6 Oct 1917–13 Feb 1921 and 28 Mar 1921–31 Dec 1923.
100	Frank McIntyre	6 Oct 1917	5 Jan 1929	11	(1865–1944) Chief of Bureau of Insular Affairs with rank of major general, 6 Oct 1917–5 Jan 1929.
101	Frank W. Coe	24 May 1918	19 Mar 1926	8	(1870–1947) Chief of Coast Artillery with rank of major general, 24 May 1918–19 Mar 1926.
102	Clarence C. Williams	16 Jul 1918	1 Apr 1930	11	(1869–1958) Chief of Ordnance with rank of major general, 16 Jul 1918–1 Apr 1930.
103	Harry L. Rogers	22 Jul 1918	27 Aug 1922	4	(1867–1925) Quartermaster General with rank of major general, 22 Jul 1918–27 Aug 1922.
104	Merritte W. Ireland	8 Aug 1918	31 May 1931	13	(1867–1952) Assistant Surgeon General, American Expeditionary Force, with rank of emergency major general, 8 Aug 1918–30 Oct 1918; Surgeon General with rank of major general, 4 Oct 1918–31 May 1931.
105	Peter C. Harris	1 Sep 1918	31 Aug 1922	4	(1865–1951) Adjutant General with rank of major general, 1 Sep 1918–31 Aug 1922.
106	Robert E. Noble	30 Oct 1918	21 Aug 1919	1	(1870–1956) Assistant Surgeon General, American Expeditionary Force, with rank of emergency major general, 30 Oct 1918–21 Aug 1919; retired as major general, 8 Feb 1925.
107	Robert Lee Bullard	27 Nov 1918	25 Jan 1925	6	(1861–1947) National Army major general, 5 Aug 1917–31 Oct 1918; emergency lieutenant general, 16 Oct 1918–30 Jun 1920. Promoted to lieutenant general on the retired list, 21 Jun 1930.
108	Joseph T. Dickman	9 Jan 1919	6 Oct 1921	3	(1857–1928) National Army major general, 5 Aug 1917–7 Jan 1920.
109	James G. Harbord	8 Sep 1919	29 Dec 1922	3	(1866–1947) National Army major general, 26 Jun 1918–7 Jan 1920. Promoted to lieutenant general on the retired list, 9 Jul 1942.
110	Francis J. Kernan	14 Oct 1919	1 Dec 1922	3	(1859–1945) National Army major general, 5 Aug 1917–9 Jan 1920.
111	Lansing H. Beach	9 Jan 1920	18 Jun 1924	4	(1860–1945) Chief of Engineers with rank of major general, 9 Jan 1920–18 Jun 1924.
112	Charles P. Summerall	5 Apr 1920	31 Mar 1931	9	(1867–1955) National Army major general, 26 Jun 1918–30 Apr 1920; general, 23 Feb 1929–20 Nov 1930; retired as general, 31 Mar 1931.

== Timeline ==
By June 30, 1920, there were 10 major generals of the line (maj.gen. 1–10) and 10 major generals of the staff: the Quartermaster General (Q.m.Gen.), the Surgeon General (Surg.Gen.), the Chief of Coast Artillery (C.of C.A.), the Adjutant General (Adj.Gen.), the Inspector General (Insp.Gen.), the Judge Advocate General (J.A.G.), the Chief of Engineers (C.of Eng.), the Chief of Ordnance (C.of Ord.), the Chief Signal Officer (C.S.O.), and the Chief of the Bureau of Insular Affairs (C.of B.I.A.).

An officer held the permanent grade of major general (Maj.gen.) until his death; retirement; or promotion to a higher permanent grade such as lieutenant general (Lt.gen.), general (Gen.), or General of the Armies (Gen.Armies). Staff or brevet appointments to lieutenant general (Lt.gen.*) or general did not vacate the officer's permanent grade of major general; nor did appointments as major general of volunteers or in the National Army (vols.), or as emergency lieutenant general or general.

== History ==
=== Northwest Indian War ===
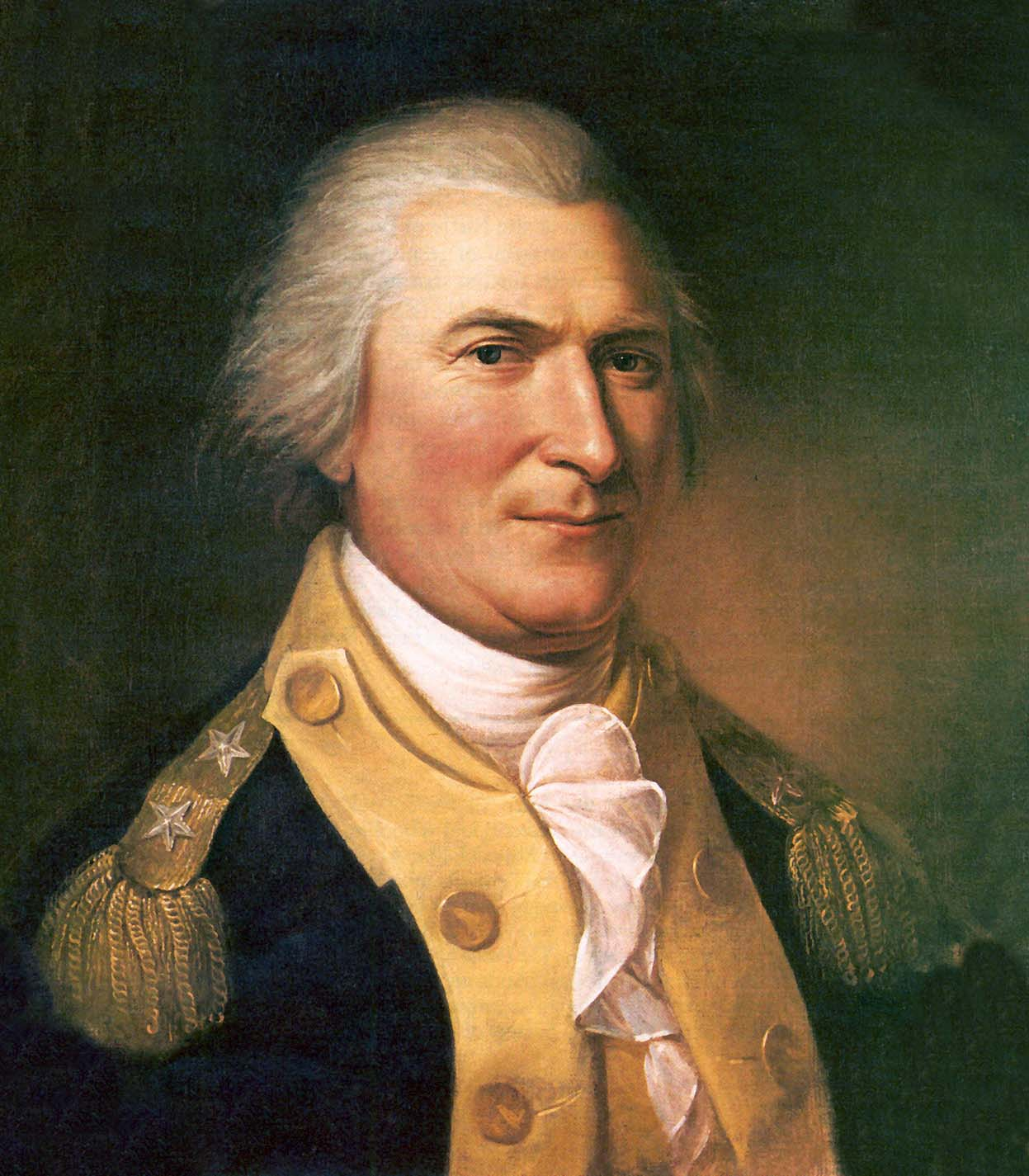
Arthur St. Clair

The first major general in the Regular Army was Arthur St. Clair, who was appointed in 1791 to prosecute the Northwest Indian War. After the disastrous Battle of the Wabash, St. Clair was replaced by Anthony Wayne, who successfully concluded the war in 1795. Wayne died in December 1796 and the grade of major general was abolished three months later.

=== Quasi-War ===
After sixteen months in abeyance, the grade of major general was revived in 1798 when the Regular Army was expanded during the Quasi-War with France. As part of the buildup, Congress authorized a lieutenant general, two major generals, and an inspector general and a quartermaster general with the rank of major general. Only one of the two line major general slots was ultimately filled; the other was declined by Henry Knox, who refused to be outranked by the designated inspector general, Alexander Hamilton, who had been junior to Knox in the Continental Army during the American Revolutionary War. The President was also authorized to temporarily augment the Regular Army with a Provisional Army, but it was never fully organized. When tensions eased, the Provisional Army was disbanded and the maximum Regular Army rank was again reduced to brigadier general.

=== War of 1812 ===
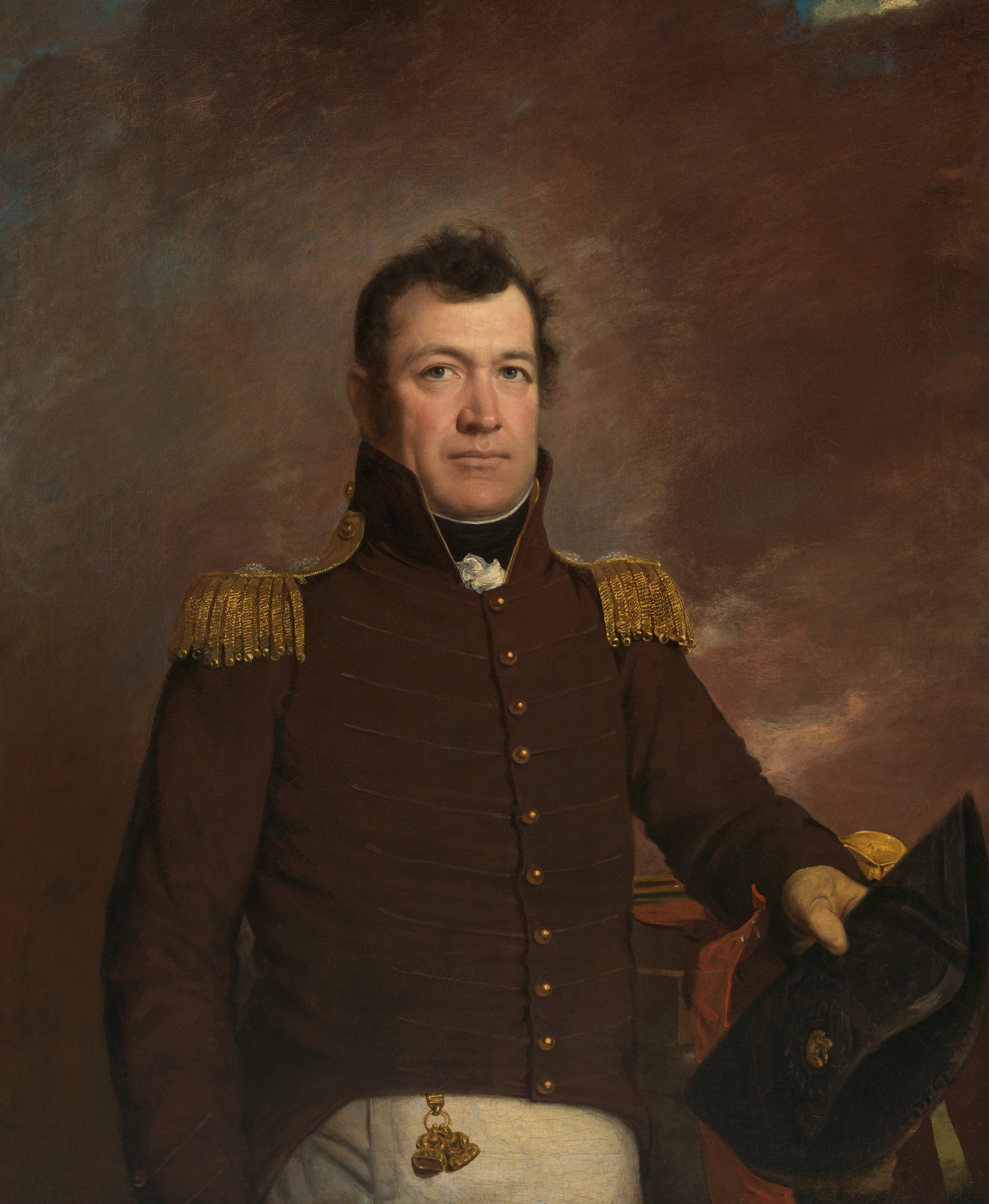
Jacob J. Brown

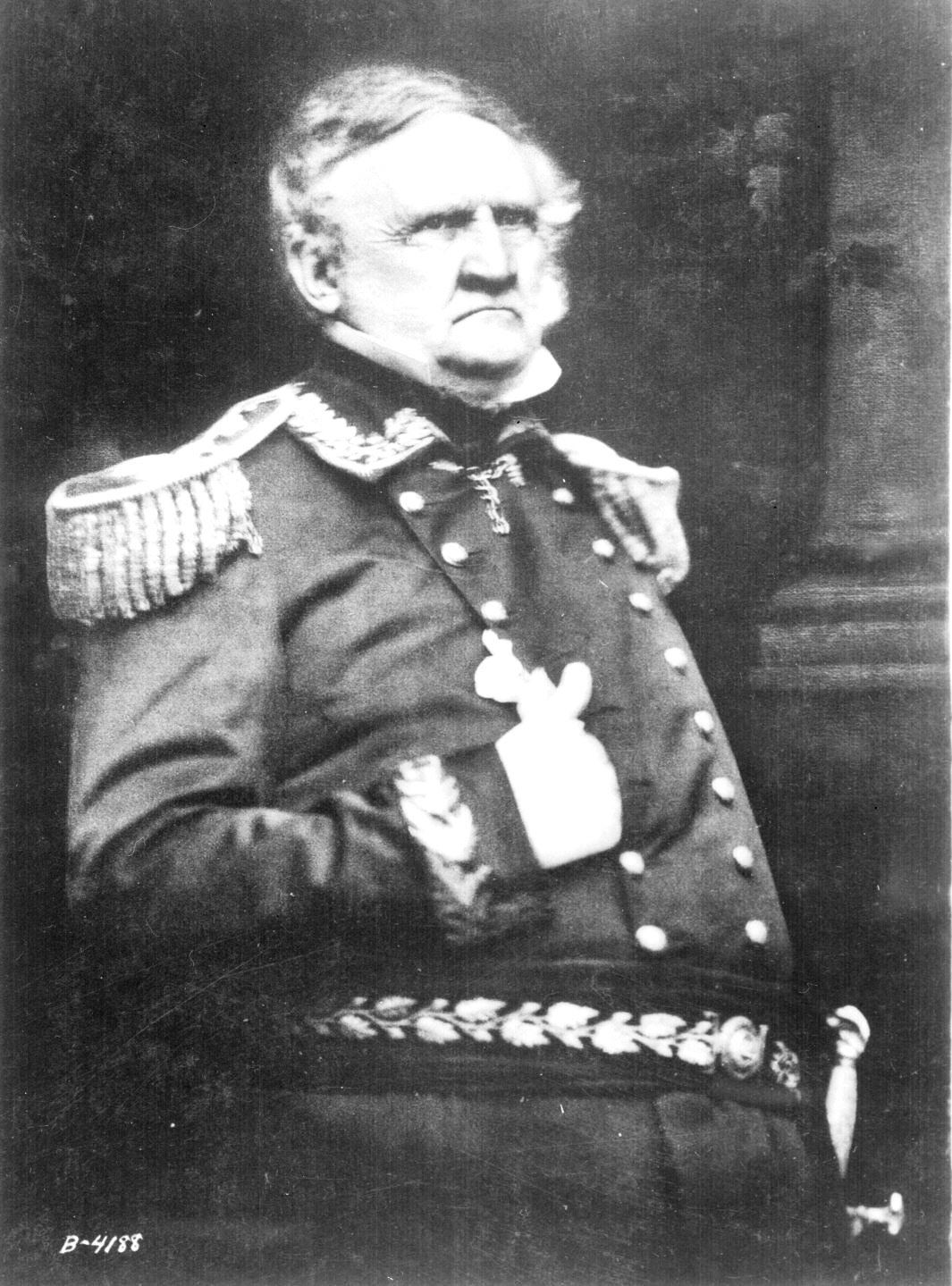
Winfield Scott

The grade of major general was revived permanently when the military establishment expanded in anticipation of the War of 1812. The first two major generals were Revolutionary War veterans Henry Dearborn and Thomas Pinckney. After a year of defeats, Dearborn was relieved and four more major generals were appointed: James Wilkinson, Wade Hampton, Morgan Lewis, and William Henry Harrison. A year later, all four had been court-martialled, sidelined, or driven to resign, and George Izard, Jacob J. Brown, and Andrew Jackson were promoted in their place.

After the war, the number of major generals was reduced to two, Brown and Jackson. In 1821 Congress eliminated the second major generalcy and Jackson departed the Army to become governor of Florida, leaving Brown to become the first Commanding General of the Army. When Brown died in 1828, the Army's two brigadier generals, Winfield Scott and Edmund P. Gaines, waged such a bitter public campaign for the vacant major generalcy that the President passed them both over in favor of Alexander Macomb. Macomb died in 1841 and was succeeded by Scott.

=== Mexican War ===
Scott remained the Army's senior officer during the Mexican War. After the outbreak of hostilities in 1846, Congress temporarily authorized a second major general on the condition that he be immediately discharged upon the ratification of a peace treaty, and the Army's three brigadier generals were passed over in favor of Zachary Taylor, victor at Palo Alto and Resaca de la Palma. Two more major generals were authorized the following year on the same basis, Gideon J. Pillow and John A. Quitman. After the war, the extra major generals were duly discharged and Scott again became the Army's only major general. Scott was breveted lieutenant general in 1855 but continued to occupy the substantive grade of major general until he retired in 1861.

=== Civil War ===
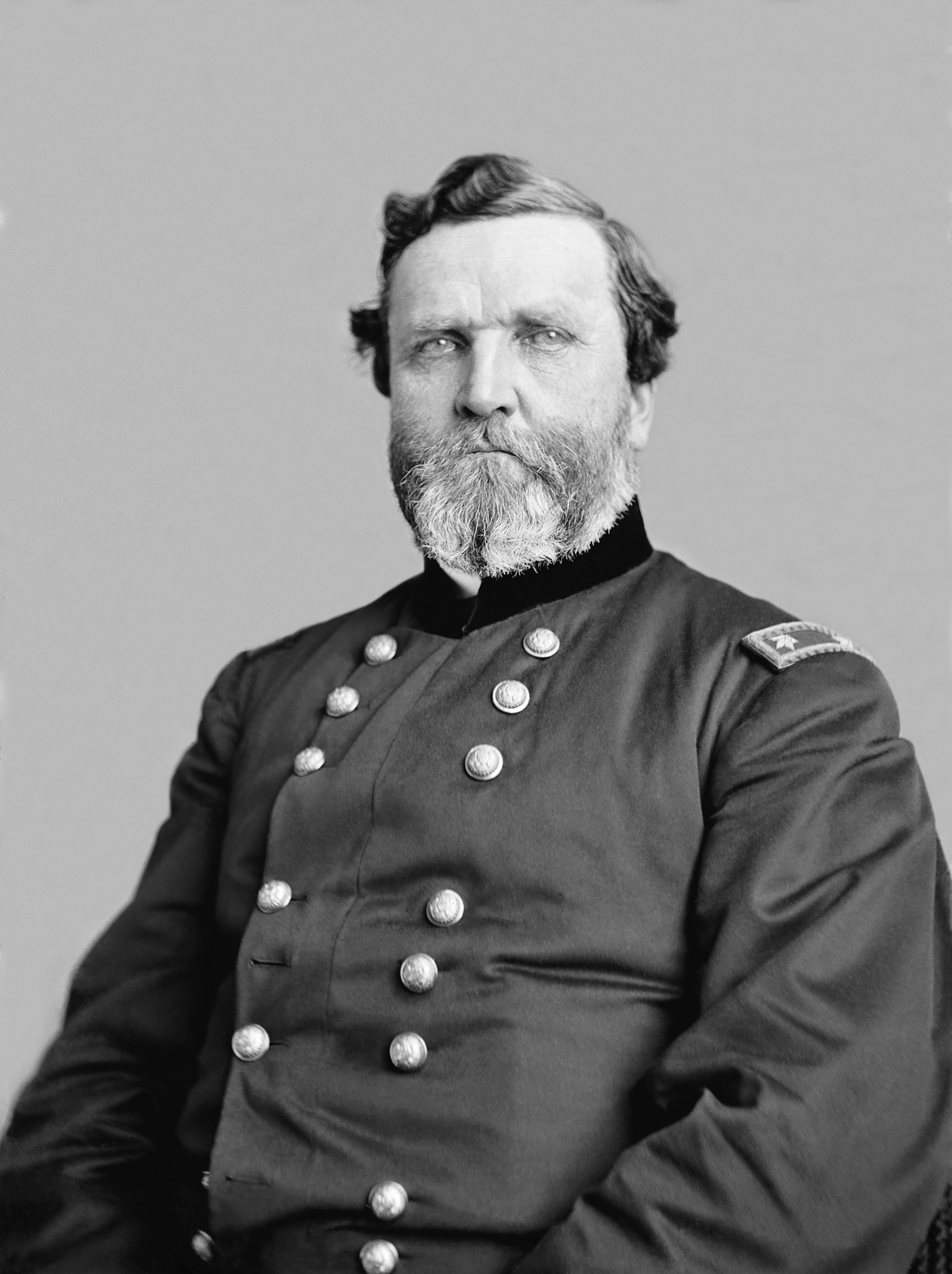
George H. Thomas

During the American Civil War, the bulk of the Union Army was composed of volunteer forces raised by individual states and led by dozens of federally appointed major generals of volunteers. The Regular Army itself was authorized a total of five major generals. Three of the new vacancies were filled immediately by former Regular Army officers George B. McClellan, John C. Frémont, and Henry W. Halleck, while Regular Army brigadier general John E. Wool was promoted for capturing Norfolk, Virginia, during the Peninsular Campaign. Subsequent appointments were reserved as prizes for major generals of volunteers who won decisive battlefield victories: Ulysses S. Grant for Vicksburg, William T. Sherman for Atlanta, George G. Meade for Spotsylvania, Philip H. Sheridan for Cedar Creek, and George H. Thomas for Nashville.

When the volunteers were disbanded after the war, its Regular Army officers reverted to their permanent grades. Many of the most famous Union Army major generals had been appointed to that rank only in the volunteer service and did not achieve the equivalent grade in the Regular Army until years or decades later, if ever. For example, upon mustering out of the volunteers in 1869, Oliver O. Howard reverted to his permanent Regular Army grade of brigadier general and had to wait until 1886 to again be promoted to major general; while George A. Custer never regained his wartime rank in the Regular Army and died as a lieutenant colonel. Of the dozens of major generals of volunteers who lost their temporary ranks after the Civil War, only nine ever attained the permanent grade of major general in the Regular Army before they retired.

=== Postwar ===
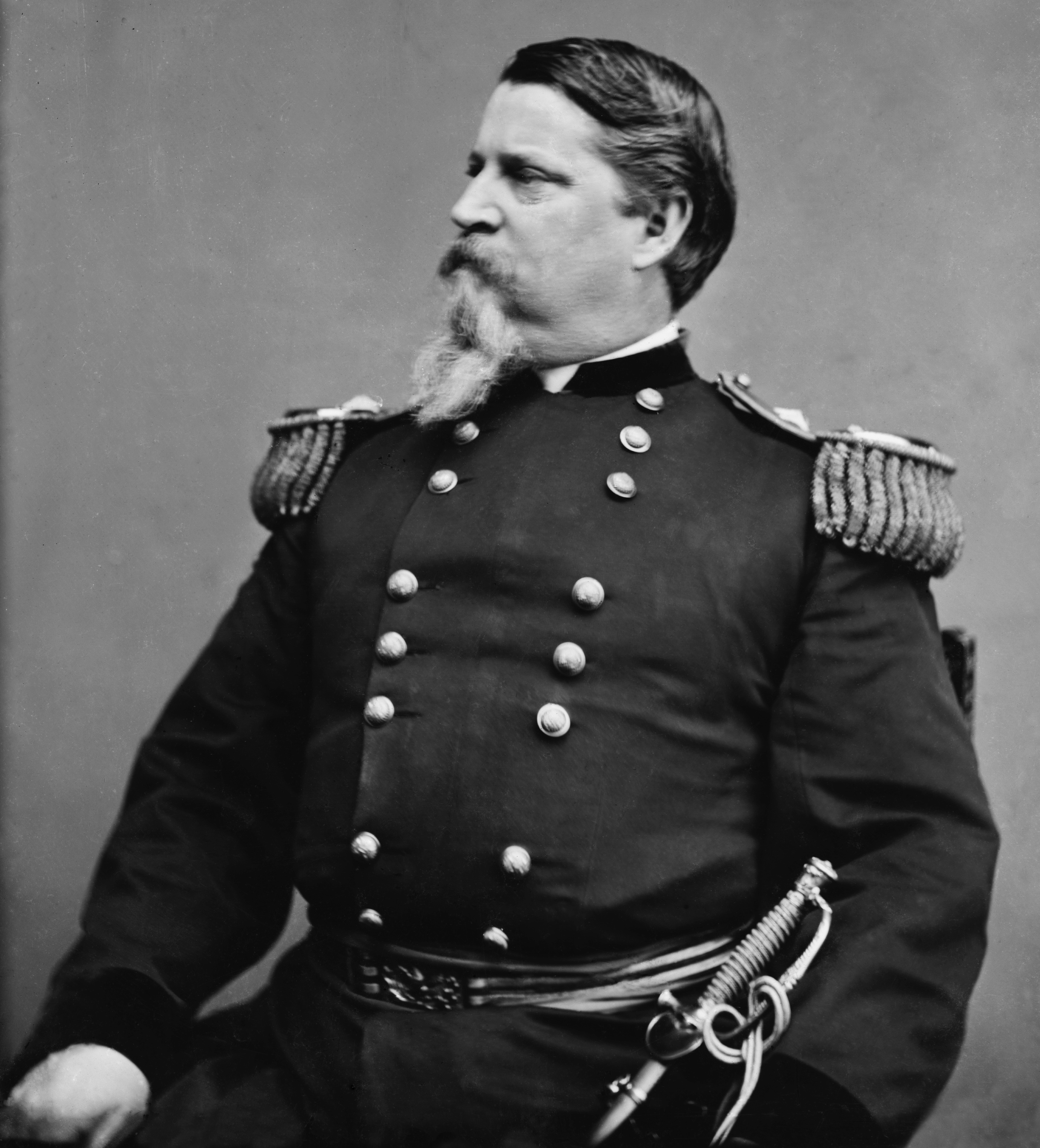
Winfield S. Hancock

After the Civil War, promotions in the Regular Army virtually ceased due to the reduction in the size of the Army and the youth of its remaining officers. The postwar Army had only three major generalcies, which initially were held by officers whose rapid wartime promotions had advanced them to high command at such a young age that they could occupy the coveted grade for decades, obstructing further promotions. For example, John M. Schofield held his major generalcy for nearly 26 years, and Winfield S. Hancock for nearly twenty.

To unblock the promotion flow, Congress mandated in 1882 that officers must retire at age 64, but could retire sooner if they had at least forty years of service. Because officers nearing the age limit could now conveniently select their exit dates to coincide with vacancies in higher grades, it became common to fill each vacancy with a parade of aging veterans who would each be promoted and immediately retired with the higher rank and retired pay, as a reward for past service. In January 1904, for example, a single vacant major generalcy hosted five officers in five days, each of the first four in turn being promoted and then retired after only one day in grade to clear the way for the next. Congress blocked this practice in 1906 by requiring that general officers serve at least one year before being allowed to retire at that rank, except for age or disability.

=== Major generals of the staff ===
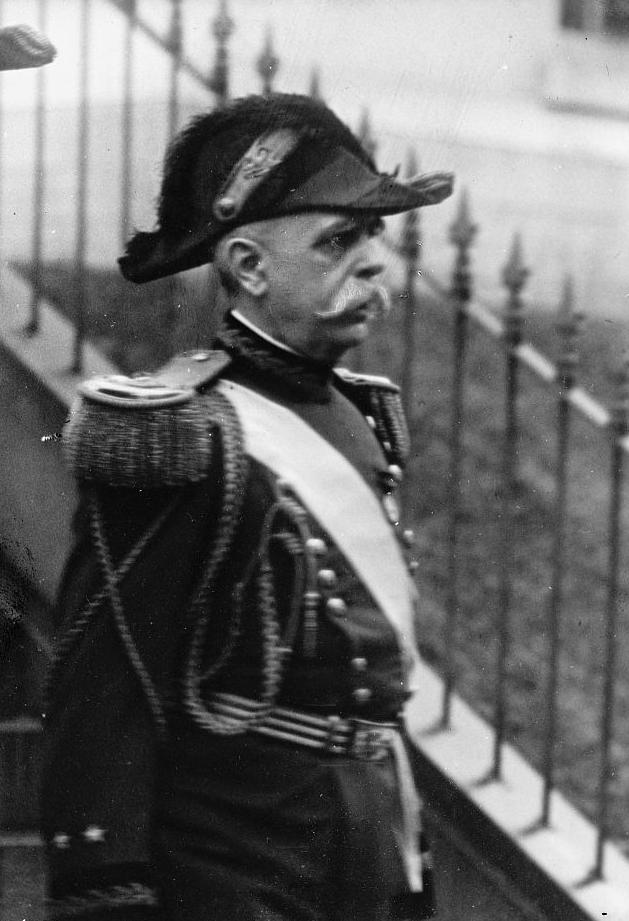
Fred C. Ainsworth

Officers in the Regular Army were classified either as line officers, who commanded combat formations, or staff officers, who performed specialized support functions. Permanent promotions to general officer grades were only available in the line. Staff officers could temporarily acquire the rank and pay of a general officer while detailed to certain offices designated by statute to carry that rank, such as chief of a staff bureau, but reverted to their permanent grades upon leaving such an office. Officers holding the permanent personal grade of general officer were called general officers of the line, while general officers holding only temporary ex-officio rank were called general officers of the staff.

For most of the 19th century, general officers of the staff were limited to the rank of brigadier general, but in 1900 the rank of the Adjutant General was temporarily increased to major general for the term of its then-incumbent, Henry C. Corbin. In 1904 Corbin transferred to a line command but retained the office of Adjutant General and its associated rank. In his absence, the Adjutant General's Department was merged with the Record and Pension Office into a consolidated bureau headed by Fred C. Ainsworth, who was appointed Military Secretary with the rank of major general. The Military Secretary was retitled Adjutant General after Corbin retired in 1906, and the office's rank reverted to brigadier general when Ainsworth was dismissed in 1912.

Major generals of the staff proliferated after 1912, when the Quartermaster Corps was created under a Quartermaster General bearing the temporary rank of major general. The Surgeon General reached that rank in 1915 when William C. Gorgas was appointed to that post and promoted to major general in the Medical Department to reward his service during the construction of the Panama Canal. The Chief of Coast Artillery became a major general of the staff in 1916. Finally, every other chief of a staff corps, department, or bureau was elevated to major general on October 6, 1917.

=== World War I ===
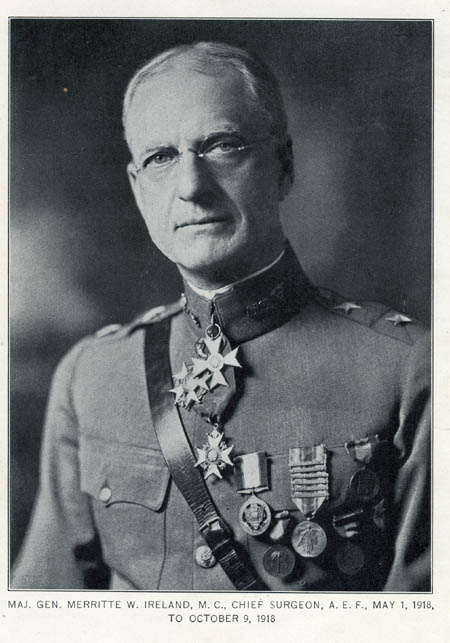
Merritte W. Ireland

When the United States entered World War I in April 1917, the President was authorized to raise a temporary force of volunteers and conscripts, initially dubbed the National Army and later referred to as the non-permanent establishment of the United States Army after the Regular Army, National Army, and federalized National Guard were unified on August 7, 1918. Congress also granted authority to add an appropriate number of general officers to each organization "for the period of the existing emergency," which at first was used only for temporary appointments to major general and brigadier general in the National Army, but was later construed to allow emergency appointments to general and lieutenant general in the Regular Army. In July 1918 an emergency major general was authorized for service abroad as Assistant Surgeon General with the American Expeditionary Force; Merritte W. Ireland was appointed, followed by Robert E. Noble when Ireland became Surgeon General later that year. In contrast to the temporary general officers of the National Army or unified United States Army, emergency general officers were considered part of the permanent establishment. All emergency and temporary commissions expired with the wartime legislation on June 30, 1920.

After the war the Army was reorganized and the new peacetime establishment was authorized 21 major generals of the line, more than doubling the previous number, plus 13 major generals of the staff, including the newly created Chiefs of Infantry, Cavalry, and Field Artillery. The reorganization took effect on July 1, 1920.

== Legislative history ==
The following list of Congressional legislation includes all acts of Congress directly pertaining to appointments to the grade of major general in the Regular Army. It does not include legislation pertaining solely to appointments to that grade in the non-permanent establishment, or by brevet.

Each entry lists an act of Congress, its citation in the United States Statutes at Large, the total number of active-duty major generals authorized subsequent to the act, the subsequent number of active-duty major generals of the line, the subsequent number of active-duty major generals of the staff, and a summary of the act's relevance.

Legislation	Citation	Total	Line	Staff	Summary
Act of March 3, 1791	1 Stat. 222	1	1	0	Authorized one major general.
Act of May 30, 1796	1 Stat. 483	1	1	0	Established total of one major general.
Act of March 3, 1797	1 Stat. 507	0	0	0	Repealed authorization for major general.
Act of July 16, 1798	1 Stat. 604	3	2	1	Established total of two major generals.; Authorized Inspector General with rank of major general.
Act of March 3, 1799	1 Stat. 752	4	2	2	Authorized Quartermaster General with rank of major general.
Act of March 16, 1802	2 Stat. 132	0	0	0	Established brigadier general as maximum peacetime rank.
Act of January 11, 1812	2 Stat. 671	2	2	0	Established total of two major generals.
Act of February 24, 1813	2 Stat. 801	8	8	0	Authorized six additional major generals.
Act of March 3, 1815	3 Stat. 225	2	2	0	Established total of two major generals.
Act of March 2, 1821	3 Stat. 615	1	1	0	Established total of one major general.
Act of June 18, 1846	9 Stat. 17	2	2	0	Authorized one additional major general, to be discharged at the end of the Mexican War.
Act of March 3, 1847	9 Stat. 184	4	4	0	Authorized two additional major generals, to be discharged at the end of the Mexican War.
Act of July 19, 1848	9 Stat. 247	1	1	0	Repealed requirement to immediately discharge the additional major general authorized by the Act of June 18, 1846.; Suspended all promotions to general officer until total reduced to one major general and two brigadier generals.
Act of July 29, 1861	12 Stat. 280	5	5	0	Authorized four additional major generals.
Act of July 28, 1866	14 Stat. 332	5	5	0	Established total of five major generals.; Authorized retirement for disability due to wounds received in battle at full rank of command held when wounded (James B. Ricketts, Eli Long, Richard W. Johnson, Thomas J. Wood, Joseph Hooker, Daniel E. Sickles, John C. Robinson, Samuel S. Carroll, Thomas W. Sherman, George L. Hartsuff retired as major generals).
Act of April 10, 1869	16 Stat. 54	5	5	0	Authorized retirement of Samuel P. Heintzelman for disability due to wounds received in battle at full rank of command held when wounded.
Act of July 15, 1870	16 Stat. 315	3	3	0	Established total of three major generals.; Suspended promotions to major general until total reduced below three.
Act of March 3, 1875	18 Stat. 512	3	3	0	Reduced retired rank of officers disabled by wounds received in battle to actual rank held when wounded (Eli Long, Richard W. Johnson, Thomas J. Wood reduced to brigadier general).
Act of January 28, 1881	21 Stat. 321	3	3	0	Authorized promotion of Edward O. C. Ord to major general on the retired list.
Act of April 19, 1890	26 Stat. 58	3	3	0	Authorized retirement of John C. Frémont as major general.
Act of June 6, 1900	31 Stat. 645	4	3	1	Increased rank of senior major general of the line commanding the Army to lieutenant general.; Temporarily increased rank of Adjutant General to major general for term of present incumbent (Henry C. Corbin, promoted to lieutenant general April 15, 1906).
Act of February 2, 1901	31 Stat. 748	7	6	1	Established total of six major generals of the line.; Authorized promotion to major general on the retired list of one retired officer who may have distinguished himself in command of a separate army during the Spanish–American War (William R. Shafter).
Act of February 5, 1903	32 Stat. 796	7	6	1	Authorized promotion of Henry C. Merriam to major general on the retired list.
Act of April 23, 1904	33 Stat. 259	8	6	2	Established Military Secretary with rank of major general for term of first incumbent (Frederick C. Ainsworth, retitled Adjutant General March 5, 1907, and retired February 16, 1912).
Act of March 2, 1907	34 Stat. 1158	7	6	1	Retitled Military Secretary as Adjutant General.; Authorized retirement as major general of any presently serving brigadier general who had held that rank for at least three years and had served in the Regular or Volunteer forces during the Civil War before April 9, 1865 (Charles F. Humphrey, Alexander Mackenzie, Robert M. O'Reilly, George B. Davis).
Act of August 24, 1912	37 Stat. 569	7	6	1	Increased rank of Quartermaster General to major general.
Act of March 4, 1915 (a)	38 Stat. 1062	8	7	1	Temporarily authorized one additional major general of the line from April 29, 1915, until December 4, 1915, in order to retain Major General Arthur Murray on the active list beyond his statutory retirement date until the close of the Panama-Pacific International Exposition.; Authorized promotion to major general on the retired list of any retired brigadier general who was a major general of volunteers during time of war and who served in the Regular or Volunteer forces during the Civil War before April 9, 1865 (Peter J. Osterhaus, James H. Wilson, William M. Graham Jr., Jacob F. Kent).; Authorized one-grade promotion on the retired list of any retired officer who served more than two years as a Volunteer officer during the Civil War before April 9, 1865, and subsequently served more than forty years as a Regular officer, and was awarded two Medals of Honor and a brevet (Frank D. Baldwin).
Act of March 4, 1915 (b)	38 Stat. 1191	10	8	2	Temporarily authorized one additional major general of the line for the promotion of George W. Goethals (retired November 15, 1916).; Temporarily authorized one additional major general in the Medical Department for the promotion of William C. Gorgas (retired October 3, 1918).; Authorized one-grade promotion upon retirement of any officer detailed for more than three years in Panama with the Isthmian Canal Commission, if not otherwise promoted by this Act (Carroll A. Devol, Robert E. Noble).
Act of June 3, 1916 [ National Defense Act ]	39 Stat. 166	13	11	2	Authorized four additional major generals of the line.; Temporarily increased rank of Surgeon General to major general for term of present incumbent (William C. Gorgas).
Act of July 6, 1916	39 Stat. 345	14	11	3	Increased rank of Chief of Coast Artillery to major general.
Act of August 29, 1916	39 Stat. 628	14	11	3	Authorized promotion to major general on the retired list of any retired brigadier general who served in the Army throughout the Civil War, the Spanish–American War, and the interval between the wars; commanded a brigade or higher as a general officer in operations against an enemy; and either was recommended to be a major general of volunteers by the commanding general of the Army or commanded a brigade or higher as senior colonel in the Civil War (Alexander C. M. Pennington Jr., Peter C. Hains, Theodore Schwan, Oswald H. Ernst).; Authorized promotion to major general on the retired list of any retired officer who served at least one year in the Regular or Volunteer forces during the Civil War before April 9, 1865; subsequently served at least forty years as a Regular officer; and was the last active-duty Civil War veteran (John L. Clem).
Act of October 6, 1917	40 Stat. 410	20	10	10	Increased rank of chief of any staff corps, department, or bureau to major general.
Act of July 9, 1918	40 Stat. 853	23	12	11	Temporarily authorized two additional major generals of the line for the promotion of any chief of a staff corps, department, or bureau who had forty or more years of service (Henry G. Sharpe, retired May 1, 1920; and William Crozier, retired January 1, 1919).; Temporarily authorized one additional Assistant Surgeon General with rank of emergency major general for service abroad during World War I (Merritte W. Ireland, Robert E. Noble).
Act of June 4, 1920	41 Stat. 760	34	21	13	Established total of twenty-one major generals of the line; Established Chiefs of Infantry, Cavalry, Coast Artillery, Field Artillery, Signal Corps, Corps of Engineers, and Air Service with rank of major general.

== See also ==
- Major general (United States)
- General officers in the United States
- List of American Civil War generals
- List of United States Army four-star generals
- List of lieutenant generals in the United States Army before 1960
- List of brigadier generals in the United States Regular Army before February 2, 1901
