= Devol =

Devol may refer to:

- Devol (album)
- Devol (deity), a deity in Sinhala Buddhist mythology.

== People ==
- Devol Brett (1923–2010), United States Army Air Forces general who piloted American aircraft during crises and wars from 1948 (the Berlin Crisis) through the Vietnam War (1960s)
- Frank Denny De Vol (1911–1999), sometimes known simply as DeVol, was an American arranger, composer and actor
- George Devol, inventor (1912–2011), inventor of the first industrial robot
- George Devol (poker player) (1829–1903), American professional riverboat poker player
- Devon Scott (nickname s Devol; born 1994), American basketball player in the Israel Basketball Premier League

== Places ==
- Devol, Oklahoma
- Devoll (river) or Devolli, a river in southern Albania
  - Devol (Albania) or Deabolis, a former Bulgarian and Byzantine fortification on the Devol river
  - Treaty of Devol, between Bohemund I of Antioch and Byzantine Emperor Alexius I
  - Devoll District, in the Korçë County of south-eastern Albania
  - Devoll Hydro Power Plant, a proposed power plant on the Devoll River, in Albania
- Devol (Macedonia) or Devolgrad, Diabolis, a medieval fortress near Kavadarci, present-day Republic of North Macedonia

== See also ==
- Devo (disambiguation)
- Devoll (disambiguation)
