= Hillside Cemetery (Anniston, Alabama) =

Historic cemetery in Calhoun County, Alabama, US

- U.S. National Register of Historic Places
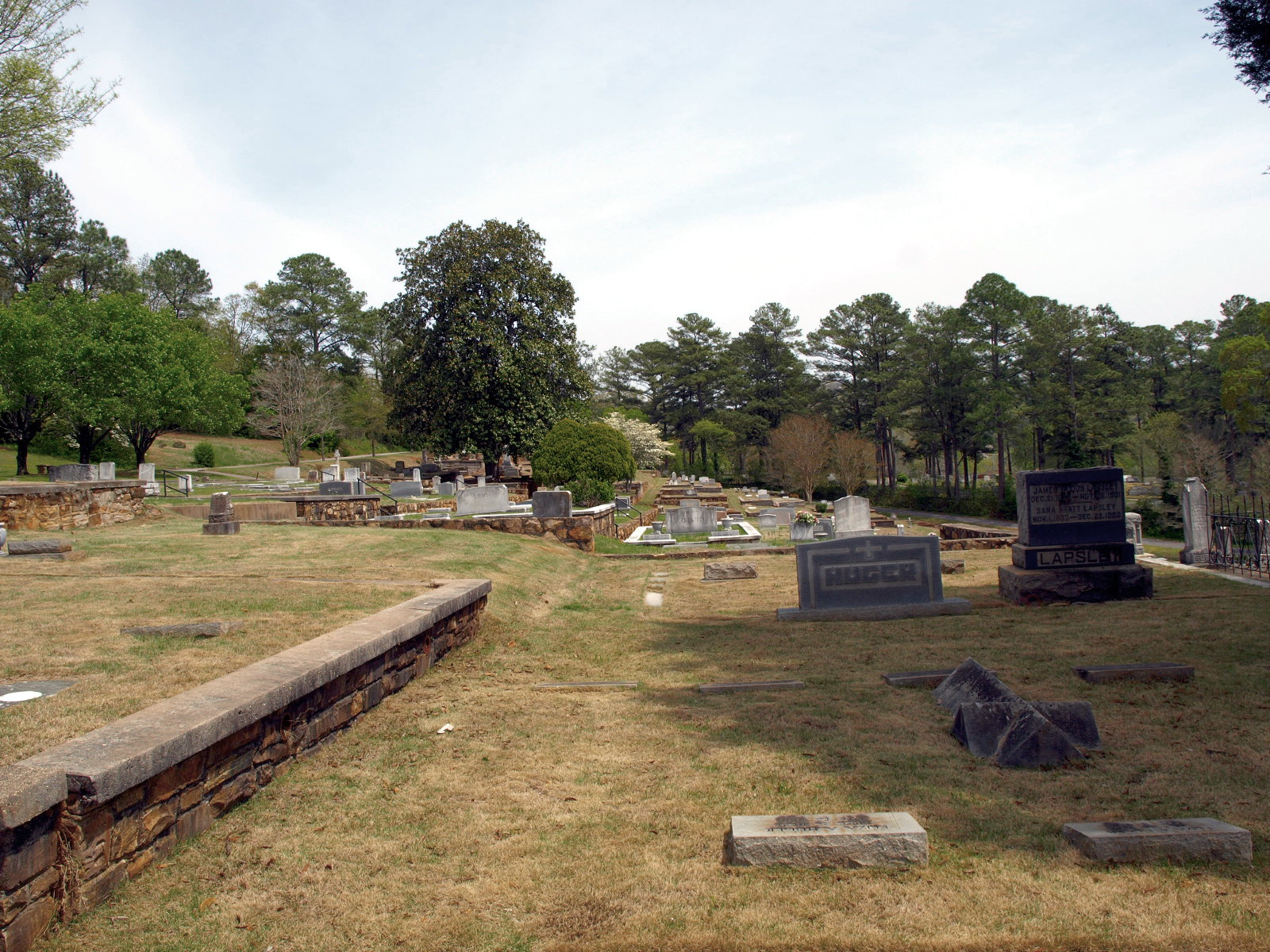
- The cemetery in 2014

- Location within Alabama
- Location: Highland Avenue between Tenth and Eleventh Streets, Anniston, Alabama
- Coordinates: 33°39′29″N 85°49′03″W
- Area: 4.1 acres (1.7 ha)
- Built: 1876
- MPS: Anniston MRA
- NRHP reference No.: 85002870
- Added to NRHP: October 3, 1985

Hillside Cemetery is a historic cemetery in Anniston, Alabama, United States. It was established in 1876, and laid out by Nathan Franklin Barrett. It has been listed on the National Register of Historic Places since October 3, 1985.

Notable burials include US Representative Fred L. Blackmon (1873–1921) and Civil War general Daniel Tyler (1799–1882). Robert Ernest Noble a physician and United States Army officer who attained the rank of major general is also buried at Hillside.

The Temple Beth El section of the cemetery was designated as an Alabama Historical Cemetery on October 15, 2008.
