= Joseph Spencer =

American politician

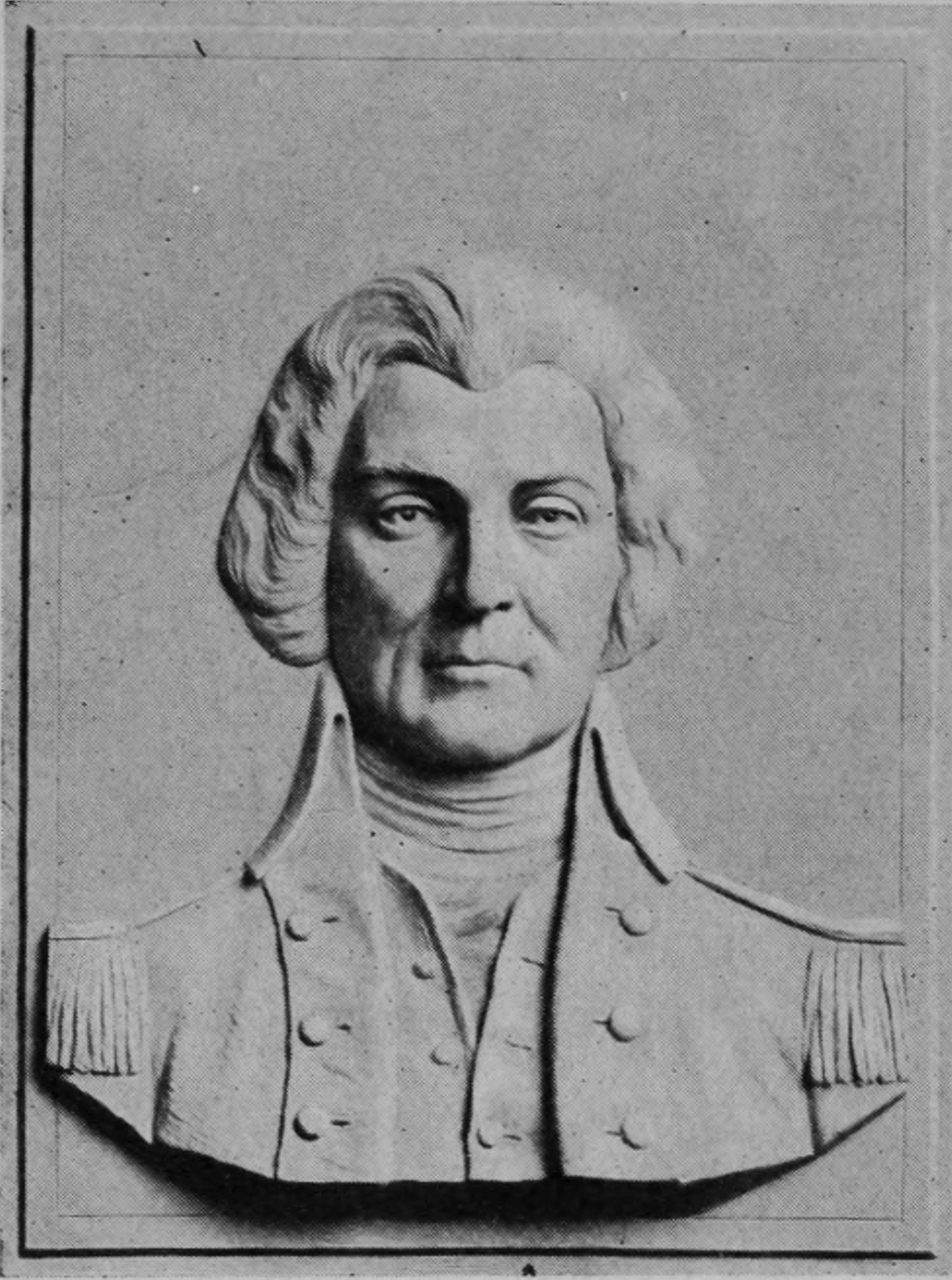

Member of the Connecticut Council
- In office 1780–1789
- In office 1776–1776

Member of the Continental Congress
- In office 1779–1779
- Preceded by: Oliver Wolcott
- Succeeded by: Oliver Wolcott

Personal details
- Born: October 3, 1714 East Haddam, Connecticut, British America
- Died: January 13, 1789 (aged 74) East Haddam, Connecticut, U.S.
- Spouses: Martha Brainerd (m. 1738; died 1754) Hannah Brown Southmaid (m. 1756)
- Children: 13
- Parents: Isaac Spencer; Mary Selden
- Profession: Lawyer

Military service
- Allegiance: Kingdom of Great Britain; United States of America
- Branch/service: Colonial Militia; Continental Army
- Years of service: 1758 (British Militia); 1775–1778 (Continental Army)
- Rank: Major general
- Unit: 12th Connecticut Militia; 2nd Connecticut Regiment
- Battles/wars: King George's War; French and Indian War; Battle of Carillon; Battle of Ticonderoga; American Revolutionary War; Siege of Boston

Joseph Spencer (October 3, 1714 – January 13, 1789) was an American lawyer, soldier, and statesman from Connecticut. During the Revolutionary War, he served both as a delegate to the Continental Congress and as a major general in the Continental Army.

== Early life ==
Spencer was born in East Haddam, Connecticut Colony. Spencer was the son of Isaac and Mary (née Selden) Spencer. He was the great-grandson of Gerard and Hannah Spencer, who were part of the first settlers of East Haddam in 1662.

== Career ==
He was trained as a lawyer and practiced until 1753, when he became a judge. He was active in the militia, serving in King George's War and as a Lieutenant Colonel of the Middlesex militia in the French and Indian War.

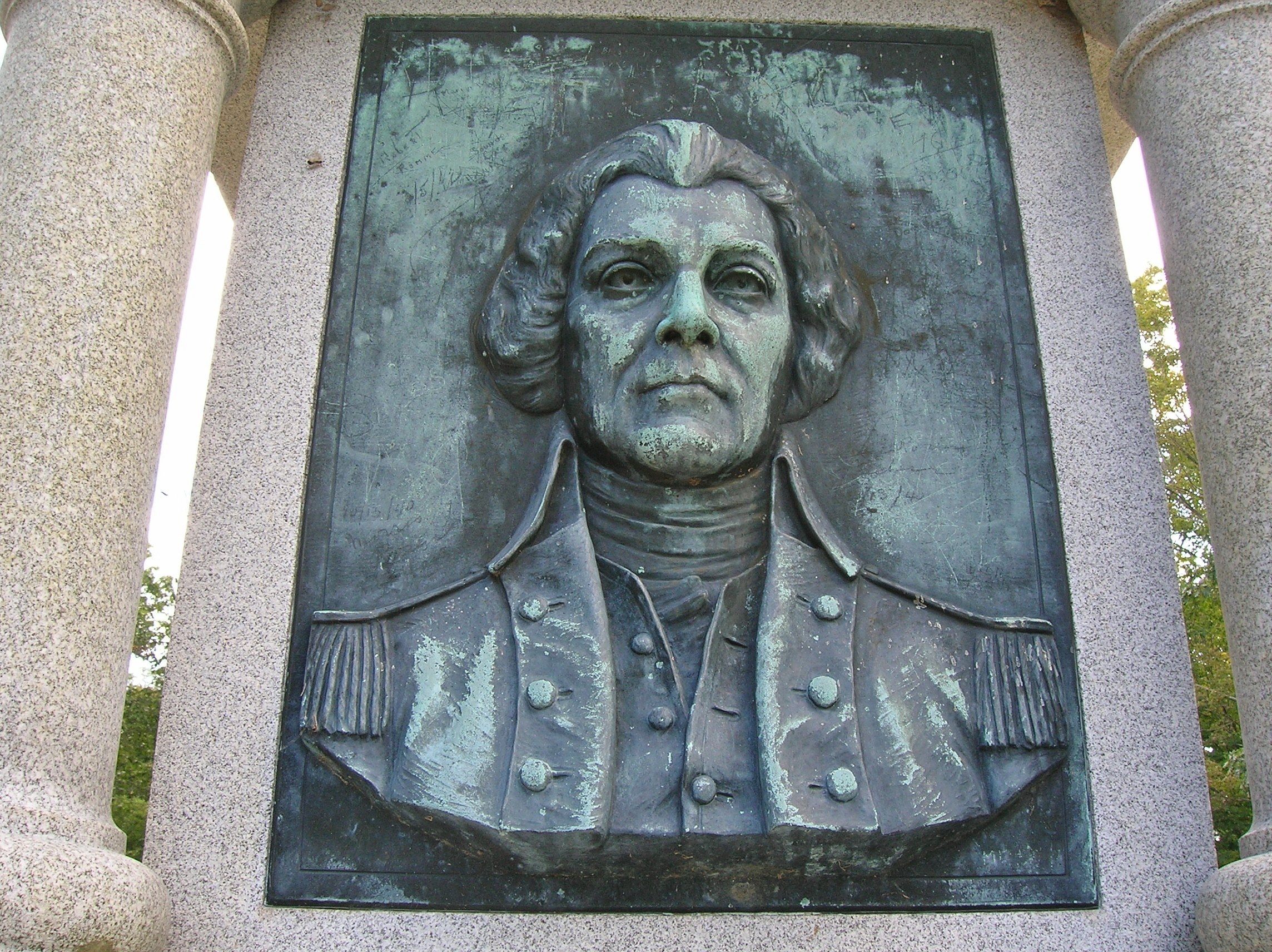
Bas relief sculpture on the memorial to Spencer located in East Haddam, CT (dedicated 1904)

By the time the American Revolution began, Spencer had advanced to Brigadier General of Connecticut's militia, and in April 1775 he led them to support the Siege of Boston as the 2nd Connecticut Regiment. In June, when these units were adopted into the national army, he was made a brigadier general in the Continental Army; he was amongst the first eight Continental Army brigadier generals so appointed.

In 1776, Spencer was promoted to major general in support of William Heath in the Eastern Department. The following year his military career became difficult. He cancelled a planned attack on British forces in Rhode Island and was censured by the Continental Congress. He demanded a court of inquiry and was exonerated, but when the controversy was resolved, he resigned his commission on January 14, 1778.

Spencer first served on the Connecticut Council (or Connecticut State Senate) in 1776. Free of military responsibility, the state sent him as a delegate to the Continental Congress in 1779. In 1780, he was returned to the council and served there until his death. From 1784 until his death, he was also a judge of the Connecticut Supreme Court of Errors. After the Revolutionary War he became eligible for membership in the Society of the Cincinnati of the State of Connecticut.

== Personal life ==
August 2, 1738, Joseph Spencer married Martha Brainerd (1716–1754), with whom he had five children.

- Martha Spencer (1739–1739/40), who died young.
- Martha Spencer (c. 1740), who married Joseph Cone Jr. (born 1735).
- Anne Spencer (born 1746).
- Joseph Spencer Jr. (1750–1824), who became a surgeon and served as an aide to his father during the Revolution.
- Nehemiah Spencer (born 1752)

After his first wife died in 1754, he married Hannah (née Brown) Southmaid (1730–1808), with whom he had eight more children, including:

- Isaac Spencer (born 1759), who served as Connecticut State Treasurer from 1818 to 1835.
- Jared Spencer (1762–1820), a twin who was a Yale graduate and an attorney who married Ann Green (1768–1855) in 1789.
- Mary Spencer (born 1762), a twin who married Turner Miner.
- Seth Spencer (born 1765)
- Hannah Spencer (1767–1843), who married Rev. Ichabod Lord Skinner (1767–1852)
- Betty Spencer (born 1770), who married Selden Warner.
- Nehemiah Spencer (1772–1839), who married Betsey Swan (died 1853)

Spencer died on January 13, 1789, in East Haddam and was buried in Millington Cemetery west of the Millington Green section of East Haddam near where he lived. Later he and his wife were reinterred at the Nathan Hale Park of East Haddam and a monument was erected in his honor.

=== Descendants ===
His granddaughter through his son Joseph, Elizabeth Spencer, was married to General Lewis Cass (1782–1866), who also served as governor of the Michigan Territory, a United States senator from the state of Michigan, and as secretary of state under President James Buchanan.

Major General Robert Ernest Noble was Spencer's great-great-great-grandson and became a member of the Society of the Cincinnati.
