= Henry C. Merriam =

United States Army general

Henry Clay Merriam
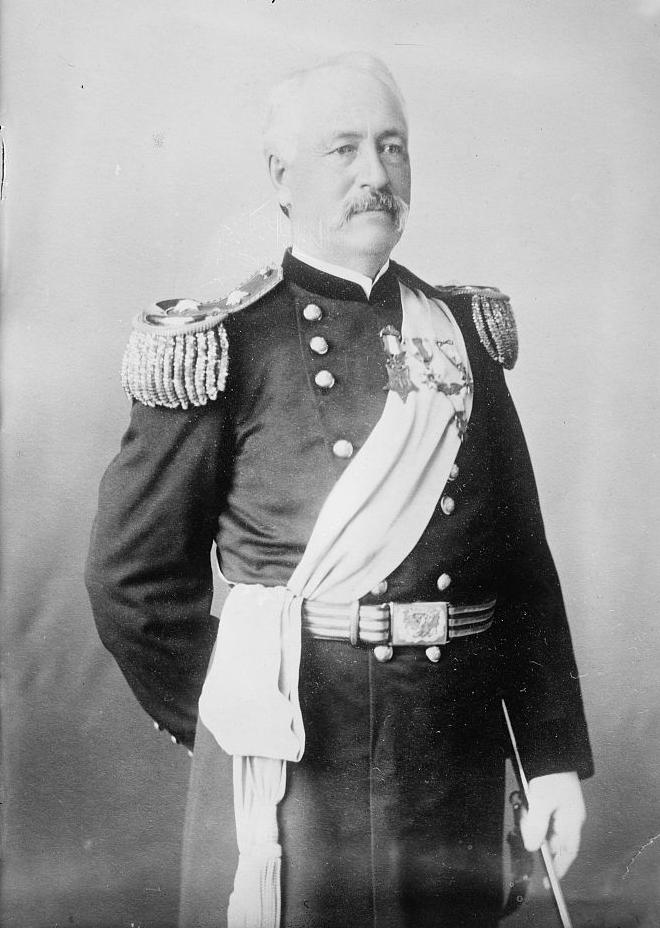
- Born: November 13, 1837; Houlton, Maine, US
- Died: November 18, 1912 (aged 75); Portland, Maine, US
- Burial place: Arlington National Cemetery
- Military career
- Allegiance: United States
- Branch: United States Army
- Service years: 1862–1865, 1866–1901
- Rank: Major General
- Commands: 1st Louisiana Native Guard (United States) 73rd Regiment Infantry U.S. Colored Troops
- Conflicts: American Civil War • Battle of Antietam • Siege of Port Hudson • Battle of Fort Blakeley; Indian Wars; Spanish–American War
- Awards: Medal of Honor

Henry Clay Merriam (November 13, 1837 – November 18, 1912) was a United States Army general. He received the United States military's highest decoration, the Medal of Honor, for his actions as a Union officer in command of African American troops during the American Civil War. He later served in various Indian Wars throughout the western United States and commanded the 7th Infantry Regiment. After being promoted to brigadier general, he took on a training and supply role during the Philippine–American War.

== Civil War Service ==
Merriam was born in Houlton, Maine, to Lewis and Mary (Foss) Merriam. He attended Colby College in Waterville but left school in 1862 to join the 20th Maine Volunteer Infantry Regiment as a captain. He participated in the Battle of Antietam on September 17 and received a brevet promotion to lieutenant colonel for his actions there. In 1863, he went to Louisiana to help recruit African American troops and was placed in command of the 1st Louisiana Native Guard. He led this regiment at the Siege of Port Hudson on May 27, 1863. Two years later, after the unit had been re-organized as the 73rd Infantry Regiment, United States Colored Troops, he led an attack on Confederate positions at Fort Blakeley in Baldwin County, Alabama, on April 9, 1865. For these actions, he was brevetted colonel and, several decades later on June 28, 1894, awarded the Medal of Honor. His official Medal of Honor citation reads: "Volunteered to attack the enemy's works in advance of orders and, upon permission being given, made a most gallant assault."

== Indian Wars period ==
After being mustered out of the Army on October 24, 1865, Merriam began studying law. Less than a year later, on July 28, 1866, he returned to the military as a major in the 38th Infantry Regiment. He served with this unit during expeditions against Native Americans in Kansas in 1867. While in commanded of Fort McIntosh on the Texas–Mexico border in 1876, he bombarded Mexican forces which had committed "outrages" against Americans and he crossed the border to rescue a kidnapped U.S. commercial agent. After being promoted to lieutenant colonel and assigned to the 2nd Infantry Regiment on June 10, 1876, he was sent to the northwestern U.S. during the Nez Perce War. In Idaho and Washington, he managed Native American tribes and was commended by his superiors for his success in gathering the Indians on reservations and opening land for white settlers.

On July 10, 1885, Merriam was promoted to colonel of the 7th Infantry Regiment and commanded Fort Laramie, Wyoming, for the next four years. After being re-stationed in Fort Logan, Colorado, he led troops along the Cheyenne River in South Dakota during the Sioux uprising which followed the death of Sitting Bull.

== Later career ==
Appointed brigadier general on June 30, 1897, Merriam was transferred to the Department of the Columbia, which covered the northwestern United States. During this time, he organized a rescue mission to save miners in Alaska who had been trapped by mid-winter weather. At the outset of the Spanish–American War, he was named major general of volunteers and placed in command of the entire U.S. Pacific coast, including Hawaii. His duties included equipping, training, and transporting units bound for the ensuing Philippine–American War. In January 1899, he left his western post and took command of the Departments of the Colorado and the Missouri. He retired from the Army in 1901, having reached the mandatory retirement age.

By a special act of Congress on February 5, 1903, he was promoted in retirement to major general. He was the inventor of the "Merriam Pack" which was used by infantry soldiers. He married Una MacPherson at Fort Brown, Texas, in 1874 and had three sons and two daughters. Merriam died in Portland, Maine on November 18, 1912, and was buried in Arlington National Cemetery.

General Merriam was a companion of the Maine Commandery of the Military Order of the Loyal Legion of the United States.

== See also ==
- Fort Spokane
- List of American Civil War Medal of Honor recipients: M–P
- List of major generals in the United States Regular Army before 1 July 1920
