= George Brett (general) =

United States general

George Howard Brett
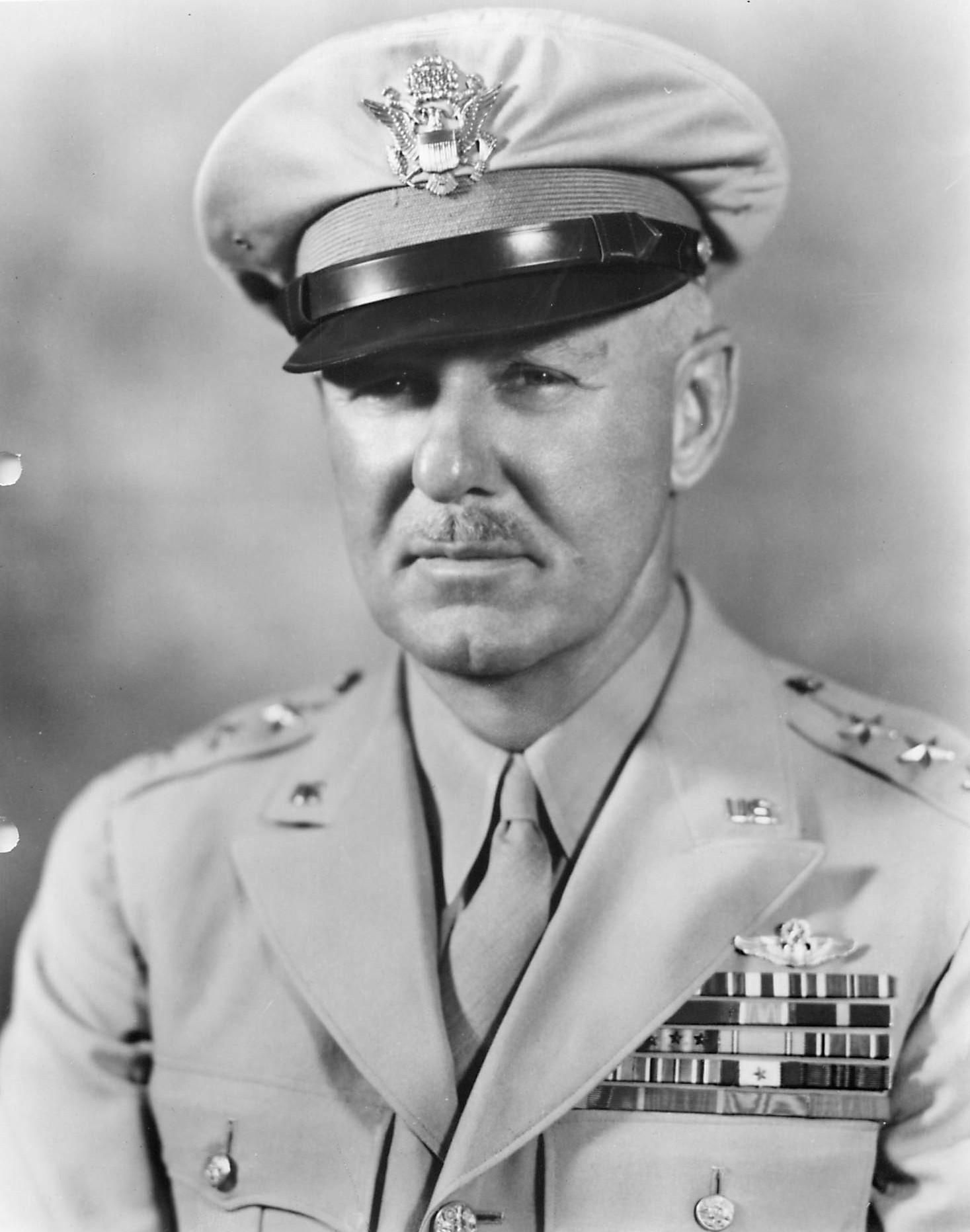
- Born: 7 February 1886; Cleveland, Ohio, U.S.
- Died: 2 December 1963 (aged 77); Orlando, Florida, U.S.
- Burial place: Winter Park, Florida
- Military career
- Allegiance: United States of America
- Branch: United States Army Air Forces
- Service years: 1910–1946
- Rank: Lieutenant General
- Service number: 0-2764
- Commands: 19th Composite Wing; US Army Air Corps; Caribbean Defense Command
- Conflicts: Philippine–American War; World War I; Banana Wars; World War II; Western Desert Campaign; Burma Campaign; Dutch East Indies campaign; Battle of the Coral Sea; New Guinea campaign
- Awards: Distinguished Service Medal (2); Silver Star; Distinguished Flying Cross; Order of Orange-Nassau (Netherlands); Knight Commander of the Order of the Bath (United Kingdom)

George Howard Brett (7 February 1886 – 2 December 1963) was a United States Army Air Forces General during World War II. An Early Bird of Aviation, Brett served as a staff officer in World War I. In 1941, following the outbreak of war with Japan, Brett was appointed Deputy Commander of a short-lived major Allied command, the American-British-Dutch-Australian Command (ABDACOM), which oversaw Allied forces in South East Asia and the South West Pacific. In early 1942, he was put in charge of United States Army Forces in Australia, until the arrival of Douglas MacArthur. Brett then commanded all Allied Air Forces in the Southwest Pacific Area. In November 1942, he was appointed commander of the US Caribbean Defense Command and remained in this post for the rest of the war.

== Early life ==
George Howard Brett was born in Cleveland, Ohio on 7 February 1886, the second of five children of William Howard Brett, a notable librarian, and his wife Alice née Allen. George's older brother Morgan graduated with the United States Military Academy at West Point class of 1906, and served for many years as an ordnance officer, retiring in 1932 as a colonel. The family was unable to secure a second West Point appointment, so George Brett graduated from the Virginia Military Institute in 1909 and was commissioned as a second lieutenant in the Philippine Scouts on 22 March 1910. While in the Philippines he transferred to the US Cavalry on 10 August 1911, joining the 2nd Cavalry.

Brett returned to the United States in May 1912 and was first stationed at Fort Bliss. In December 1913, he moved to Fort Ethan Allen where he became friends with a fellow lieutenant of the 2nd Cavalry, Frank Maxwell Andrews, who was engaged to the daughter of Major General Henry Tureman Allen. While serving as one of Andrews' groomsmen, Brett met Mary Devol, one of the bridesmaids, and the daughter of another Army officer, Major general Carroll A. Devol. Brett married Mary Devol in Denver on 1 March 1916. Influenced by Allen and Andrews, Brett transferred to the Aviation Section, U.S. Signal Corps on 2 September 1916. He attended aviation school and on graduation in 1916 was assigned to the office of the Chief Signal Officer in Washington, D.C. where he was promoted to first lieutenant on 1 July 1916 and captain on 15 May 1917.

== World War I ==
Brett departed for the Western Front in November 1917 but suffered a case of appendicitis, resulting in the loss of his flight status. After making a partial recovery, he served in France as senior materiel officer under Brigadier General Billy Mitchell, attaining the temporary rank of major on 7 June 1918. After briefly returned to the United States to serve in Office of the Director of Military Aeronautics in Washington, D.C. from 1 August to 23 September 1918, Brett went to England to command the United States Army Air Service Camp at Codford.

== Between the wars ==
Brett was posted to Kelly Field, Texas, in December 1918, where he commanded the Aviation General Supply Depot until February 1919, when he became the maintenance and supply officer at the Air Service Flying School. He commanded the Air Service depot in Morrison, Virginia for a month in October 1919 before being assigned to the office of the Director of the Air Service in Washington, DC, where his rank of major became permanent in 1920. That year he took command of Crissy Field. His first son, the future United States Air Force Lieutenant General Devol "Rock" Brett, was born at nearby Letterman Army Hospital at the Presidio of San Francisco in 1923.

From 1924 to 1927 Brett was stationed at the intermediate depot at Fairfield, Ohio, where he was the officer in charge of the field service section. Starting in June 1927 he attended the Air Corps Tactical School at Langley Field, Virginia, after which he was selected for the two-year Command and General Staff School at Fort Leavenworth, Kansas. He commanded Selfridge Field, Michigan for time before returned to Fort Leavenworth as an Air Corps instructor from 1933 to 1935. After 16 years as a major, he was finally promoted to lieutenant colonel and was selected to attend the Army War College. On graduation, he became commander of the 19th Wing, then stationed in the Panama Canal Zone, with the temporary rank of brigadier general. While he was stationed there, his eldest daughter Dora married his aide, the future general, Bernard A. Schriever.

On his return from Panama, Brett reverted to his permanent rank of lieutenant colonel. He was briefly stationed in Menlo Park, California, before moving to Langley, Virginia, where he became chief of staff to his old friend Frank Andrews, now the commander of GHQ Air Force. In February 1939 Brett moved to Wright Field as assistant to the chief of the United States Army Air Corps, also serving as commandant of the Air Corps Engineering School and the chief of the Materiel Division. Once again he held the rank of brigadier general before being promoted to major general on 1 October 1940.

== World War II ==
=== Middle East ===
When his immediate superior, Major general Henry H. "Hap" Arnold, was temporarily transferred to the Army General Staff in November 1939, Brett acted as Chief of the Air Corps. In May 1941, he formally became Chief of the Air Corps for a four-year term, but the June 1941 reorganisation that made Arnold the Chief of United States Army Air Forces made the post of Chief of the Air Corps somewhat redundant. Brett was sent to the United Kingdom to determine how the Army Air Forces could better support Royal Air Force Lend-Lease requirements. His recommendation that American labor and facilities be established in the United Kingdom to handle the repair, assembly, and equipping of American aircraft created a stir on both sides of the Atlantic, and was ultimately disapproved by Arnold on the grounds that the personnel and equipment were not available.

On August 31 with Major Curtis LeMay as his co-pilot and Brett as Chief of the Air Corps as a passenger, Caleb V. Haynes took off from Bolling Field to begin a 26,000-mile (42,000 km) round trip journey to Egypt and beyond, conveying Brett to Basra, Iraq, on a special mission. Brett's outspoken criticism of arrangements in the Middle East antagonised his hosts to the extent that the British Ambassador to Egypt, Sir Miles Lampson, complained about him to the Foreign Secretary, Sir Anthony Eden. Air Marshal Sir Arthur Tedder noted that "the charms of General Brett’s company were beginning to pall. After a talk with him on the afternoon of 25 September I wondered in my journal how he and all the American visitors could lay down the law about things of which they knew next to nothing." As a result, Brett was ordered to return to the United States in December.

=== East Indies ===
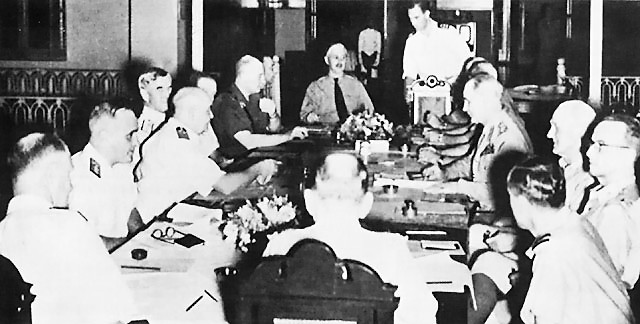
ABDA COMMAND meeting with General Wavell for the first time. Seated around the table, from left: Admirals Layton, Helfrich, and Hart, General ter Poorten, Colonel Kengen, Royal Netherlands Army (at head of table), and Generals Wavell, Brett, and Brereton.

The outbreak of war between the United States and Japan in December 1941 changed things and Brett received new orders. He first flew to Rangoon and then, in the company of the Sir Archibald Wavell, the British Commander-in-Chief, India, on to Chungking where the two met with Generalissimo Chiang Kai-shek. They obtained a promise of Chinese troops to assist in the defence of Burma. Near Rangoon, Wavell's and Brett's aircraft was attacked by Japanese aircraft and they were forced to make an emergency landing at a friendly aerodrome in Burma. The area was then bombed by the Japanese, but neither general was harmed. Brett was appointed Deputy Supreme Commander of the American-British-Dutch-Australian Command (ABDA), under Wavell, on 1 January 1942, and was promoted to lieutenant general on 7 January 1942. He arrived in Darwin on 28 December 1941. In January he moved to Lembang in West Java, where Wavell established his headquarters. The rapid advance of Japanese forces through South East Asia had soon split the Allied-controlled area in two. Brett departed Java for Australia on 23 February 1942, reaching Melbourne the next day, where he resumed command of US Army Forces in Australia. ABDA was formally dissolved on 25 February.

=== Australia ===
Already, General Douglas MacArthur had also been ordered to Australia. Brett received warning from the Chief of Staff, General George Marshall that MacArthur would call on him to send a flight of long-range bombers to Mindanao. The only aircraft that Brett could find were B-17s of the 19th Bombardment Group which had seen hard service in the Philippines and the Dutch East Indies campaigns. Brett approached Vice Admiral Herbert F. Leary, the commander of naval forces in the Anzac Area, to ask for a loan of some of twelve newly arrived navy B-17s. Leary refused. Brett therefore sent four of the 19th Bombardment Group's old planes. Only one, a B-17 with no brakes piloted by Lieutenant Harl Pease, made it to Mindanao; two turned back with engine trouble, while a fourth ditched in the sea, its crew managing to escape. MacArthur was incensed and sent a message to Marshall. A message from Washington, D.C. persuaded Leary to release four new B-17s to Brett and these aircraft reached Mindanao on 16 March 1942 and managed to bring MacArthur and his party to Australia. Despite the lack of brakes, Pease also made it back, carrying sixteen refugees.

It fell to Brett to telephone Prime Minister John Curtin and inform him of MacArthur's arrival. Although Curtin was unaware of MacArthur's impending arrival, and had expected that Brett would command American forces in Australia, he was persuaded to issue a recommendation that MacArthur be made Supreme Commander South West Pacific Area. While Brett considered that he was on "very friendly terms" with Curtin, Brett felt that Curtin was "more interested in keeping the party line on wages, hours and working conditions than in the threat posed by the Japanese." General George Kenney later recalled that

I think he [Brett] made his initial mistake in sort of spurning this Labor government crowd and taking up with the conservative crowd, who had been ousted by the Labor Party and who were not going to get back into power. But Brett figured they were, so he accepted entertainment from them and entertained them in return and became quite close to them. They, in turn, kidded him along and told him they knew he was going to be the commanding general of all the Allied Forces in Australia... Yes, and he believed it, which was too bad.

The April 1942 reorganisation that established the Southwest Pacific Area reduced the United States Army Forces in Australia to a supply and administrative organisation that would soon be renamed the Services of Supply. Brett instead became commander of Allied Air Forces, Southwest Pacific Area, with his headquarters in Melbourne. One of MacArthur's first orders to Brett was for a bombing mission to the Philippines, an order which was delivered personally by MacArthur's chief of staff, Major General Richard K. Sutherland. Brett protested that his planes were worn out, his men were tired, losses might be high, and the Philippines were lost anyway. Sutherland told him the MacArthur wanted the mission carried out. Brett delegated it to Brigadier General Ralph Royce, who led the mission in person. Brett awarded Royce the Distinguished Service Cross. Henceforth, communications with Sutherland would be handled by Brett's chief of staff, Air Vice Marshal William Bostock. MacArthur personally wrote a reprimand to Brett. Further disagreements between MacArthur and Brett followed. On 6 July 1942 Marshall radioed MacArthur to offer him Major general George Kenney or Brigadier general Jimmy Doolittle as a replacement for Brett. MacArthur selected Kenney. Brett returned to the United States in his B-17, "The Swoose", on 4 August 1942. The day before, MacArthur awarded him the Silver Star "for gallantry in action in air reconnaissance in the combat zone, Southwest Pacific Area, during the months of May, June and July 1942."

=== Panama ===
After a time with no command, Brett was appointed commander of the US Caribbean Defense Command and the US Army's Panama Canal Department in succession to Lieutenant general Frank M. Andrews in November 1942. In 1945, the Inspector General, Lieutenant General Daniel Isom Sultan, investigated a series of allegations against Brett regarding the misuse of Army funds and property. He reported to Marshall that most of the charges were distortions of mission-related events and expenditures, that the remaining allegations had no basis in fact, and that no further action be taken. Brett requested voluntary retirement and retired on 30 April 1945 with the rank of major general, only to be immediately recalled to active duty the next day as a temporary Lieutenant general and as Commanding General of the Caribbean Defense Command and Panama Canal Department. On 10 October 1945, Brett handed over command to Lieutenant general Willis D. Crittenberger. For his service in Panama, Brett was awarded a second Distinguished Service Medal. The citation noted "his broad grasp of military strategy and superior knowledge of air and ground tactics" and that "he succeeded admirably in impressing the republics of Central and South America with the importance and necessity of hemispheric solidarity, imbued them with American ideals, coordinated their use of arms and equipment and indoctrinated them with American training methods – all of which fostered continued improvement in the relations between all America republics." After spending time as a patient in Brooke General Hospital, he reverted to retired status on 10 May 1946 but was later advanced to the grade of lieutenant general on the United States Air Force retired list by an Act of Congress on 29 June 1948.

== Post-war ==
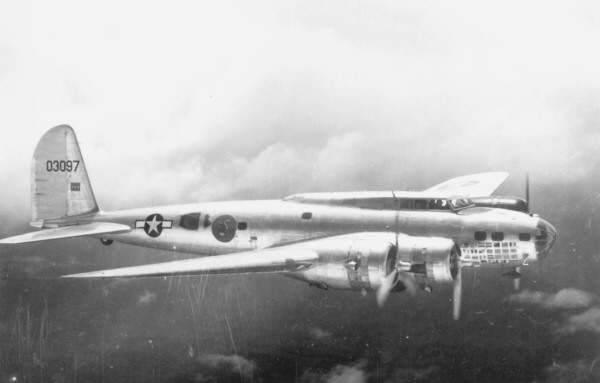
B-17D BO AAF Ser. No. 40-3097 The Swoose in 1944

The B-17D, The Swoose, which Brett used extensively for his personal transport during World War II, and which he often piloted, is today the oldest, intact, surviving B-17 Flying Fortress and the only "D" model still in existence. It was transferred from the Smithsonian National Air and Space Museum to the National Museum of the United States Air Force on 15 July 2008.

Brett served on several committees and Air Force boards, including Flying Pay Board, the Air Force Association Board, and the President's Service Academy Board between 1949 and 1950. When his son Rock Brett was deployed in the Korean War, George Brett took in his daughter-in-law and grandchildren and cared for them. Brett lived in Winter Park, Florida until his death at age 77. He died of cancer on 2 December 1963 at the hospital at Orlando Air Force Base. Survived by his wife, children, and grandchildren, he was buried in Winter Park, Florida.

== Dates of rank ==
Insignia	Rank	Component	Date
No insignia in 1910	Second Lieutenant	Philippine Scouts	22 March 1910
No insignia in 1911	Second Lieutenant	Cavalry	10 August 1911
	First Lieutenant	Cavalry	1 July 1916
	First Lieutenant	Signal Corps	2 September 1916
	Captain	Signal Corps	15 May 1917
	Major	National Army	7 June 1918
	Major	Air Service	1 July 1920
	Lieutenant Colonel	Army Air Corps	1 October 1934
	Brigadier General	Temporary	20 August 1936
	Colonel	Temporary	10 September 1938
	Colonel	Army Air Corps	1 January 1939
	Brigadier General	Army Air Corps	31 January 1939
	Major General	Army of the United States	1 October 1940
	Major General	Army Air Corps	31 May 1941
	Lieutenant General	Army of the United States	7 January 1942
	Major General	Retired	30 April 1945
	Lieutenant General	United States Air Force (Retired)	10 June 1948

== Notes ==
Military offices
Preceded by Henry H. Arnold	Chief of Air Corps; 1938–1941	Succeeded by None
