= Devoll =

Devoll may refer to:

- Devoll (municipality), in Korçë County, southeastern Albania
- Devoll (river), in southern Albania

== See also ==
- Devol (disambiguation)
