= Carroll Augustine Devol =

United States Army general

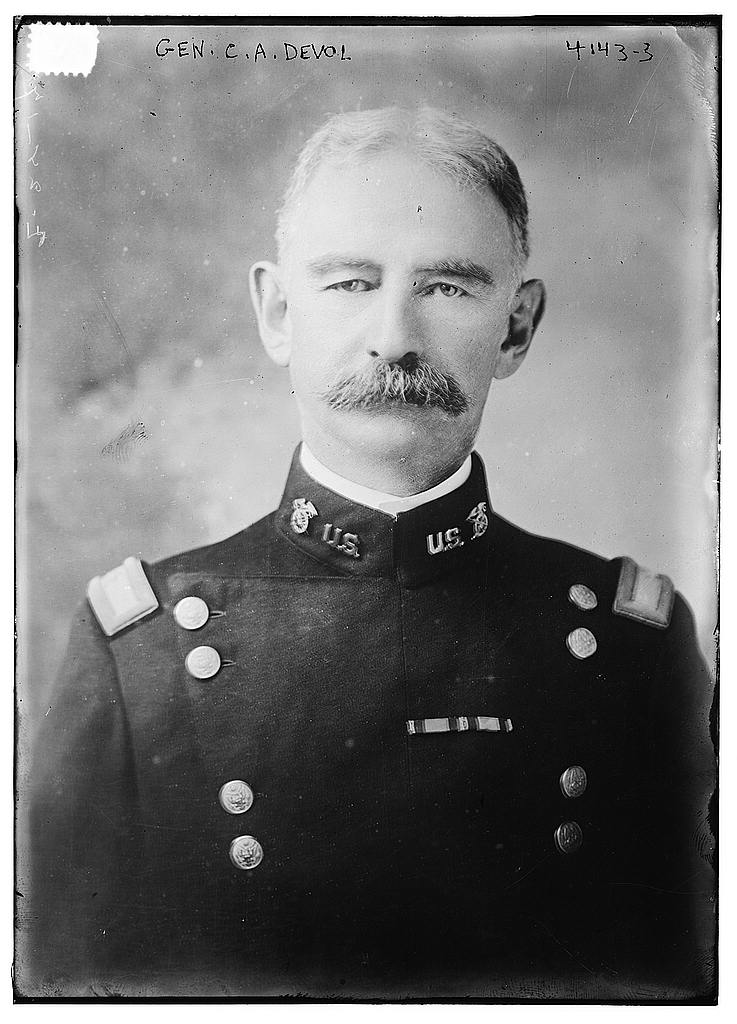
- Born: April 17, 1859; Waterford, Ohio, US
- Died: June 3, 1930 (aged 71); Redwood City, California, US
- Military career
- Allegiance: United States
- Branch: United States Army
- Rank: Major general
- Unit: 25th Infantry Regiment

Carroll Augustine Devol (April 17, 1859 - June 3, 1930) was a major general in the United States Army who killed himself in 1930.

== Biography ==
He was born on April 17, 1859, in Waterford, Ohio. He married Isadora Scott Devol. Their daughter, Mary Adelaide Devol, married George H. Brett on 1 March 1916.

He became a second lieutenant for the 25th Infantry Regiment on September 1, 1879, a first lieutenant on October 19, 1886, and a regimental quartermaster sergeant from April 1, 1887, to April 19, 1891.

In 1895 he was a professor of Military Science and Tactics at the University of Wisconsin.

He became a captain assistant quartermaster on August 21, 1896, a major quartermaster on October 17, 1898, and a lieutenant colonel quartermaster from February 6, 1899, to March 2, 1899.

He was honorably discharged from the military.

He was quartermaster at the Presidio of San Francisco during the 1906 San Francisco earthquake and was in charge of the distribution of military and civil supplies to refugees from the disaster.

He killed himself with a gunshot through his heart on June 3, 1930, at his home in Redwood City, California, after learning of his terminal diagnosis of stomach cancer.
