= Robert Ernest Noble =

U.S. Army major general and physician (1870–1956)

Robert E. Noble
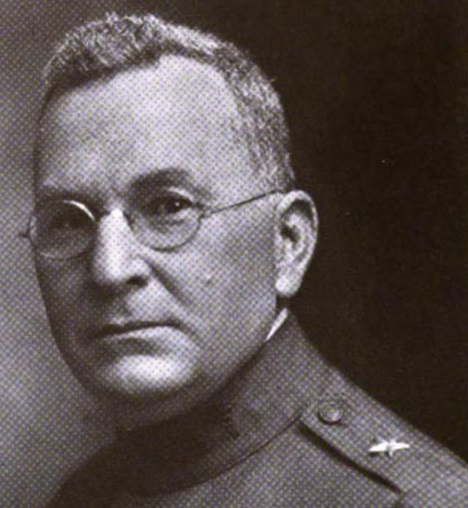
- From the February 1923 issue of The American Journal of Clinical Medicine
- Born: November 5, 1870; Rome, Georgia. U.S.
- Died: September 18, 1956 (aged 85); Fort McClellan, Alabama
- Burial place: Hillside Cemetery, Anniston, Alabama
- Alma mater: Alabama Polytechnic Institute (B.S, M.S.); College of Physicians and Surgeons of New York City (M.D.)
- Spouse: Ella Lupton (m. 1905–1956, his death)
- Relatives: Nathaniel Thomas Lupton (Father-in-law); Joseph Spencer (Great-great-great-grandfather)
- Military career
- Allegiance: United States
- Branch: United States Army
- Service years: 1901–1925
- Rank: Major General
- Service number: 0–51
- Unit: United States Army Medical Corps
- Commands: Chief Surgeon, Base Section Number 2 (Bordeaux, France); Chief Surgeon, Base Section Number 5 (Brest, France); Library of the Surgeon General's Office
- Wars: Philippine–American War; United States occupation of Veracruz; World War I Occupation of the Rhineland
- Awards: Army Distinguished Service Medal; Legion of Honor (Commander) (France)

Robert E. Noble (November 5, 1870 – September 18, 1956) was an American physician and a career officer in the United States Army. A veteran of the Philippine–American War, United States occupation of Veracruz, World War I, and the Occupation of the Rhineland, he attained the rank of major general and was a recipient of the Army Distinguished Service Medal and French Legion of Honor (Commander).

A native of Rome, Georgia, Noble graduated from Alabama Polytechnic Institute (now Auburn University) with a Bachelor of Science in 1890 and a Master of Science in 1891. After working as the assistant state chemist for the states of Alabama and North Carolina from 1890 to 1895, he decided to attend the College of Physicians and Surgeons of New York City, and he graduated with an M.D. degree in 1899. He was an intern at the New York City hospital on Randalls Island from 1899 to 1900, then a house surgeon at hospitals in New York City and New Jersey, after which he began a career in the U.S. Army.

Noble entered the army as a contract surgeon and served from 1900 to 1901, when he obtained his commission as a first lieutenant in the Medical Corps. He served in the Philippines from 1900 to 1903, gaining his initial military experience during the Philippine–American War. From 1907 to 1914, he was assigned to the Isthmian Canal Commission, where he worked with William C. Gorgas on an anti-mosquito campaign to eliminate yellow fever and malaria during construction of the Panama Canal.

In 1914, Noble served with U.S. forces during the occupation of Veracruz, after which he performed staff duty in the office of the Surgeon General of the United States Army. During World War I, he was promoted to temporary brigadier general and temporary major general, and was assigned to senior Medical Corps positions, including Chief Surgeon of Base Section Number 2 in Bordeaux and Base Section Number 5 in Brest.

In 1920, Noble served on the Rockefeller Foundation commission that traveled to South Africa to investigate the causes of diseases including pneumonia. Noble was in charge of the Library of the Surgeon General's Office from 1920 to 1925. He retired in 1925, and resided in Anniston, Alabama. Noble died in Anniston on September 18, 1956. He was buried at Hillside Cemetery in Anniston.

== Early life ==
Robert Ernest Noble was born in Rome, Georgia on November 5, 1870. His mother was Lucy Bomer Wadsworth and his father George Noble was an iron manufacturer and Confederate States Army veteran of the American Civil War who served under Josiah Gorgas. He was educated in private schools in Rome and Anniston, Alabama, then began attendance at Alabama Polytechnic Institute (now Auburn University), from which he received his B.S. degree in 1890 and his M.S. in 1891. Beginning in 1890, he worked as Alabama's assistant state chemist, then held a similar position in North Carolina.

In 1895, Noble began attendance at the College of Physicians and Surgeons in New York City, from which he graduated with an M.D. degree in 1899. From 1899 to 1900 he served his internship at New York City's Randalls Island Municipal Hospital, then as house surgeon at the Infants Hospital on Randalls Island and St. Mary Hospital in Hoboken, New Jersey.

== Start of career ==
In September 1900, Noble was hired by the United States Army as a contract surgeon and assigned to duty in the Philippines. In June 1901, he received his commission as a first lieutenant in the Medical Corps. He continued to serve in the Philippines during the Philippine–American War.

After returning to the United States, Noble became a student at the Army Medical School. He was an honor graduate of his class, then carried out surgeons postings, initially at Washington Barracks, then at Fort Sheridan, Illinois, and later at Fort McDowell, California and Fort Casey, Washington. In November 1905, he married Ella Lupton of Nashville, Tennessee, the daughter of Nathaniel Thomas Lupton. They remained married until his death and had no children. He was promoted to captain in June 1906.

== Continued career ==
From 1907 to 1914, Noble served in Panama while assigned to the Isthmian Canal Commission. In this role he aided William C. Gorgas in planning and carrying out an anti-mosquito campaign to reduce the deaths and illness caused by malaria and yellow fever during construction of the Panama Canal. In January 1910, he received promotion to Major. During late 1911 and early 1912, Noble performed temporary duty in Ecuador, where he studied yellow fever and other diseases, and he performed similar temporary duty in Puerto Rico in 1912 and 1913. From 1913 to 1914, he was temporarily assigned to duty in South Africa, where he studied causes and treatments of pneumonia and other diseases. Noble was assigned to U.S. forces operating in Mexico during the occupation of Veracruz from May to September 1914.

== Later career ==
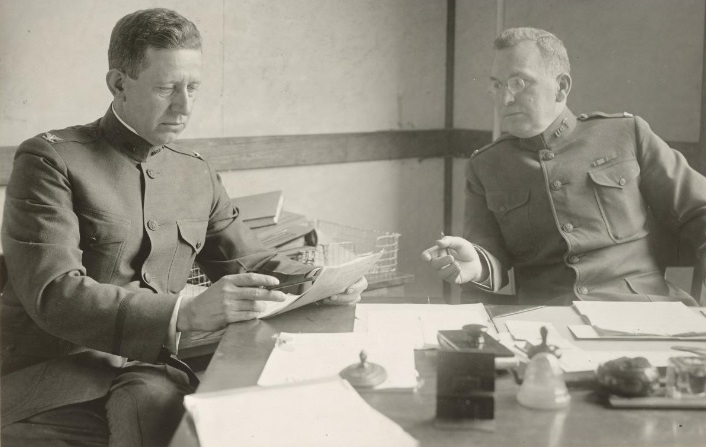
Colonels Robert E. Noble (right) and W. H. Smith (left), 1918

From 1914 to 1917, Noble performed staff duty at the United States Department of War. He was promoted to colonel in January 1918. He served in France during World War I as assistant surgeon general of the American Expeditionary Forces, and was promoted to temporary brigadier general in May 1918. He was promoted to temporary major general in October 1918, and served as Chief Surgeon of Base Section Number 2 in Bordeaux, followed by assignment as commander of Base Section Number 5 in Brest.

Noble remained in Germany after the war as part of the Occupation of the Rhineland, and he returned to the United States in August 1919. His wartime service was recognized with Army Distinguished Service Medal and French Legion of Honor (Commander). The citation for his Army DSM reads:

The President of the United States of America, authorized by Act of Congress, July 9, 1918, takes pleasure in presenting the Army Distinguished Service Medal to Major General Robert Ernest Noble, United States Army, for exceptionally meritorious and distinguished services to the Government of the United States, in a duty of great responsibility during World War I. General Noble had immediate charge of the Personnel Division of the Surgeon General's Office and solved the problem of getting medical officers into the Army during an increase from 1,500 at the beginning of the war to 30,000. He also had charge of the Hospital Division of the Surgeon General's Office, handling both of these large responsibilities with conspicuous success.

In 1920, Noble was appointed to the Rockefeller Foundation commission that visited South Africa, where they investigated the causes and treatments of pneumonia and other diseases. Noble was director of the Library of the Surgeon General's Office from 1920 to 1925. He retired in 1925.

== Retirement and death ==
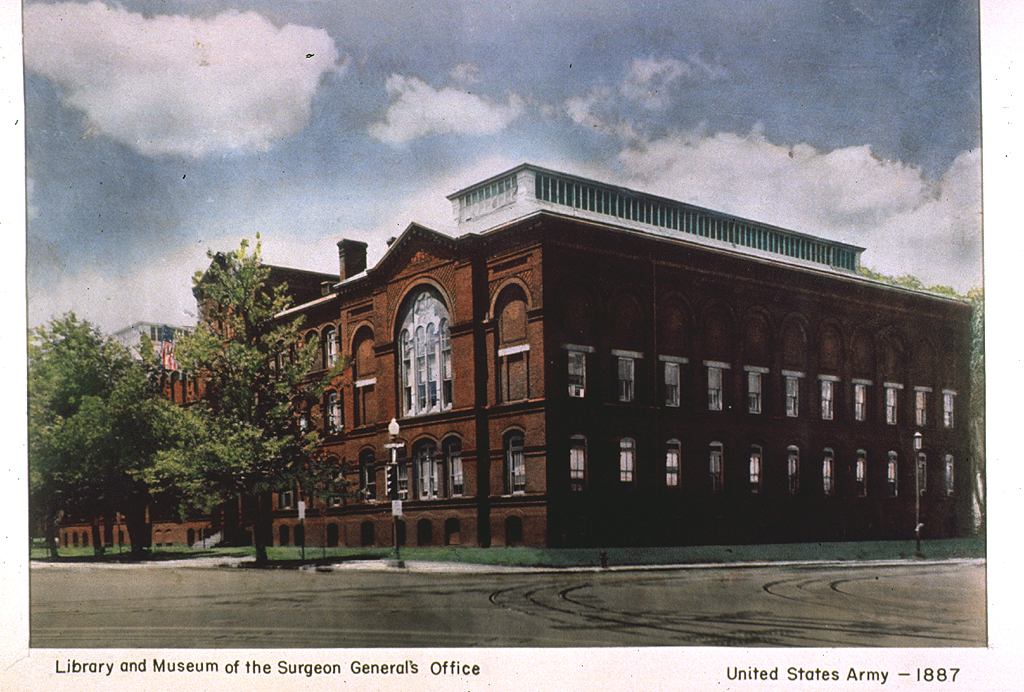
The Library and Museum of the Surgeon General's Office operated from this building on Washington, D.C.'s National Mall from 1887 until 1956. It was razed in 1969.

During his retirement, Noble resided in Anniston, Alabama and was active in civic and charitable organizations. He was a member of the Phi Delta Theta fraternity, American Medical Association and American Public Health Association. In addition, he was a member of the General Society of Colonial Wars and Society of the Cincinnati. (Note: Noble was a hereditary member of the Cincinnati as the great-great-great-grandson of Major General Joseph Spencer.) Noble became involved in politics as a Republican, and supported Dwight Eisenhower for president in 1952.

Noble was an organizer of the Boy Scouts of America in Alabama, and served as president of the organization's Choccolocco Council for seventeen years. In addition, he was a longtime member of the Anniston National Bank's board of directors.

Noble died at the Fort McClellan military hospital on September 18, 1956. He was buried at Hillside Cemetery in Anniston.
