= Devo (disambiguation) =

Devo is an American rock band formed in 1973.

Devo may also refer to:

- Devo (film), a 2024 documentary film about the band Devo
- Devo 2.0, a spin-off teen pop band created by the band Devo
- Magnus "Devo" Andersson, bassist for Swedish black metal band Marduk
- Devon White (baseball), a former baseball player
- Devo Harris, a songwriter and producer also known as Devo Springsteen
- Evolutionary developmental biology, abbreviated as evo-devo
