= Devol Brett =

United States Air Force general

Devol "Rock" Brett
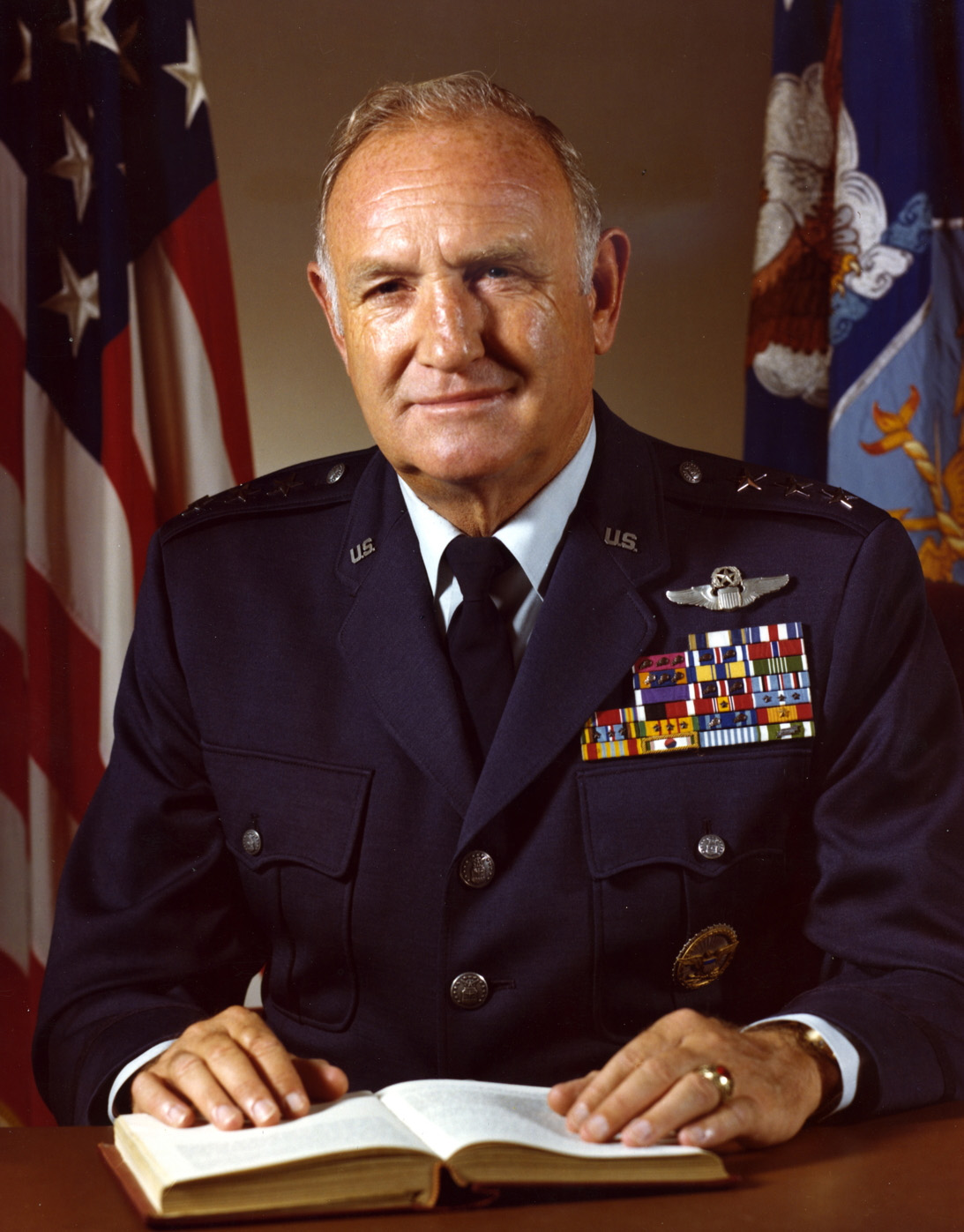
- Born: August 1, 1923; San Francisco, California, U.S.
- Died: August 14, 2010 (aged 87); Naples, Florida, U.S.
- Burial place: Arlington National Cemetery
- Military career
- Allegiance: United States of America
- Branch: United States Air Force
- Service years: 1945–1978
- Rank: Lieutenant general
- Conflicts: Korean War; Vietnam War
- Awards: Air Force Distinguished Service Medal (2); Silver Star; Distinguished Flying Cross (3); Legion of Merit (4); Bronze Star Medal; Air Medal; Air Force Commendation Medal; Army Commendation Medal; Purple Heart; Air Force Outstanding Unit Award

Carroll Devol "Rock" Brett (August 1, 1923 – August 14, 2010) was a lieutenant general in the United States Air Force (USAF) who piloted aircraft during crises and wars from 1948 (the Berlin Crisis) through the Vietnam War (1960s). He served in Austria, West Germany, South Korea, South Vietnam, the United Kingdom, Iran and Turkey, before his final assignment as commander of Allied Air Forces Southern Europe in 1977. After his retirement in 1978, he was a defense consultant for more than 20 years, retiring in 1998.

== Early life and education ==
Devol Brett was born in California in 1923 at the Presidio of San Francisco, the son of U.S. Army Air Forces (USAAF) general George Brett. He attended private high school, at Landon School in Bethesda, Maryland, graduating in 1941. In 1945 he graduated from the U.S. Military Academy at West Point, N.Y.

In 1966 he earned a master's degree in international policy from George Washington University.

== Military career ==
Upon graduation, Brett was commissioned a pilot in the USAAF. He first assignment after training, in 1946, was in Horsching, Austria; in 1947 he was assigned to the 86th Fighter Wing at Neubiberg Air Base, West Germany. In the early days of the Berlin Airlift in 1948, he flew C-47 cargo planes.

During the Korean War, Brett flew more than 100 combat missions, piloting P-51D Mustangs out of the 18th Fighter Wing. He sometimes led as many as 36 planes on a mission, each typically carrying two 500 pound bombs, six rockets, plus machine gun ammunition. His plane had the nickname "Noherohere" painted on it; his wife has asked him to "be good, but don't be a hero".

Beginning in April 1957, Brett commanded the 355th Fighter Day Squadron, out of Myrtle Beach Air Force Base, which consisted of 17 F-100 Super Sabre jets. In that position, he was featured in a 1958 Time magazine article in which an editor went weightless during dozens of short climbs and dives in Brett's F100. His unit made four major deployments to Europe, including the 1958 Lebanon crisis, where his squadron was part of the first Composite Air Strike Force, and the Berlin Crisis of 1961. In 2003 he was honored by the Air Command and Staff College Gathering of Eagles Foundation, which designated him an "Eagle"; the Foundation specifically noted his actions in the Lebanon Crisis:

On 14 July 1958, Rock Brett led his F-100D/F squadron in Operation DOUBLE TROUBLE, a top secret mission to deploy the first full Composite Air Strike Force from the U.S. to Turkey in support of Lebanon invoking the Eisenhower Doctrine following the 14 July coup d'etat in Iraq. This mission was also the first operational day/night transatlantic air-refueling mission by fighters. Brett's squadron was in place in less than 20 hours after notification. His leadership helped resolve the crisis and pave the way for today's critical Air Expeditionary Force deployments.

In the Vietnam War, Brett flew more than 100 missions in F-4C Phantom jet fighters. In 1967, he was shot down over North Vietnam by anti-aircraft fire. He broke his nose and cheekbone while ejecting from his aircraft, and was picked up by a search and rescue helicopter team after several hours in the water. The other member of his crew, a radar operator, did not survive.

From 1973 to 1975, Brett was the senior U.S. military officer in Iran, as chief of the U.S. Military Mission with the Iranian armed forces and the U.S. Military Assistance Advisory Group (MAAG) to that country. He was followed in that position by Major General Richard Secord.

In 1978, Brett retired from the USAF. His final position, which he had assumed in 1977, was as commander of Allied Air Forces Southern Europe, headquartered in Naples, Italy (part of Allied Forces Southern Europe) and (jointly) commander of U.S. Air Forces in Europe's Sixteenth Air Force, based at Torrejon Air Base, Spain.

== Military consultant ==
After retiring from the USAF, Brett became a private military consultant for the Institute for Defense Analyses (IDA). He specialized in conventional and nuclear tactical systems with emphasis on the employment of air power. While at IDA, he also did studies on search and rescue and personnel recovery for the Defense Prisoner of War/Missing Personnel Office. Among his work was a joint report in 1985, with retired General Bryce Poe, for the Federal Construction Council, on quality control of Air Force construction programs.

He retired in 2009.

== Family ==
In 1947, Brett married Hermine Mayerl of Austria. Brett, stationed in West Germany, announced the birth of their first son by flying his P-47 Thunderbolt over the village where his in-laws lived, a short flight from his air base, and dropping a canister with the message "It's a boy – George Howard Brett II." The couple had a second child, Karla.

Hermine, who went by Mimi, died in 1999. In 2005, Brett married Lou Longino, the widow of a long-time friend of his.
