= Major general (United States) =

Military rank of the United States

Major General
- Two-star insignia of the rank of major general. Style and method of wear may vary between different uniforms and different service branches.

- Shoulder boards
- Country: United States
- Service branch: United States Army; United States Marine Corps; United States Air Force; United States Space Force
- Abbreviation: MG (Army); MajGen (Marine Corps); Maj Gen (Air Force, Space Force)
- Rank: Two-star
- NATO rank code: OF-7
- Non-NATO rank: O-8
- Next higher rank: Lieutenant general
- Next lower rank: Brigadier general
- Equivalent ranks: Rear admiral in the other uniformed services which use naval ranks

In the United States Armed Forces, a major general is a two-star general officer in the United States Army, Marine Corps, Air Force, and Space Force.

A major general ranks above a brigadier general and below a lieutenant general. (Note: The rank of major general originally began as sergeant major general and was junior to the rank of lieutenant general. Over time, "sergeant" was dropped and by the late 17th/early 18th century it had been shortened to major general. As a result, the rank of lieutenant general continues to be senior to major general, even though the rank of major has always been senior to the rank of lieutenant.) The pay grade of major general is O-8. It is equivalent to the rank of rear admiral in the other United States uniformed services which use naval ranks. It is abbreviated as MG in the Army, MajGen in the Marine Corps, and Maj Gen in the Air Force and Space Force.

Major general is the highest permanent peacetime rank that can be conferred upon a commissioned officer in the uniformed services (except when General of the Army and General of the Air Force have been authorized and granted by Congress) as higher ranks are technically temporary and linked to specific positions, although virtually all officers promoted to those ranks are approved to retire at their highest earned rank. A major general typically commands division-sized units of 10,000 to 15,000 soldiers.

The Civil Air Patrol also uses the rank of major general, which is its highest rank and is held only by its national commander.

== Statutory limits ==
The United States Code explicitly limits the total number of general officers that may be on active duty at any given time, capped at 219 for the Army, 64 for the Marine Corps, 171 for the Air Force, and 21 for the Space Force. Some of these slots are reserved or finitely set by statute. For example, the Deputy Judge Advocate General of the Army is a major general in the Army; the same rank is held by the Deputy Judge Advocate General of the Air Force; the Army's Chief of Engineers is also appointed as a major general and thereafter promoted to lieutenant general.

The United States Code also limits the total number of general officers that may be on the Reserve Active Status List (RASL) in the Reserve Component, which is defined in the case of general officers as the Army National Guard, Army Reserve, Marine Corps Reserve, Air National Guard, and Air Force Reserve.

== Promotion, appointment, and tour length ==
To be promoted to the permanent grade of major general, officers who are eligible for promotion to this rank are screened by an in-service promotion board composed of other general officers from their branch of service. This promotion board then generates a list of officers it recommends for promotion to general rank. This list is then sent to the service secretary and the Joint Chiefs of Staff for review before it can be sent to the president, through the secretary of defense for consideration. The President nominates officers to be promoted from this list with the advice of the secretary of defense, the service secretary, and if applicable, the service's chief of staff or commandant.

U.S. major general rank flags

Rank flag of a major general in the United States Army.

Flag of a United States Army Chaplain major general.

The flag of a major general of the Army Medical Department.

Flag of a United States Marine Corps major general.

Flag of a United States Air Force major general.

Flag of a United States Space Force major general.

== Retirement ==
Other than voluntary retirement, statute sets a number of mandates for retirement of general officers (called flag officers in the Navy and Coast Guard). All major generals must retire after five years in grade or 35 years of service, whichever is later, unless appointed for promotion or reappointed to grade to serve longer. Otherwise, all general officers must retire the month after their 64th birthday.

== History ==
=== U.S. Army ===
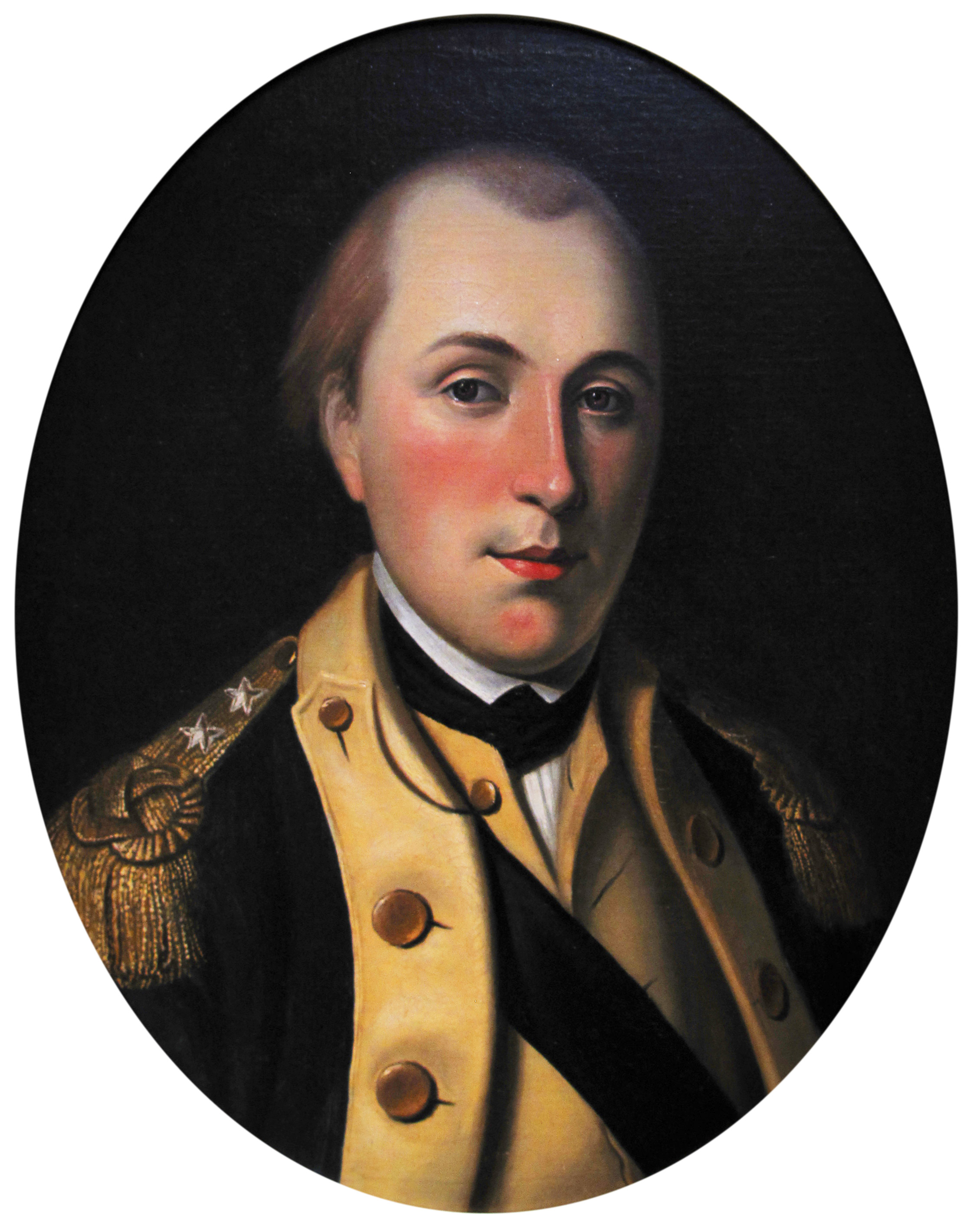
Lafayette in a uniform of a major general of the Continental Army.

The Continental Army was established on June 15, 1775, when the Continental Congress commissioned George Washington as a general and placed him in command of the Army of Observation then besieging Boston. The rank of major general was first established two days later on June 17, 1775, when two major generals were commissioned by Congress. Two more major generals were appointed on June 19.

Following the disbanding of the Continental Army at the end of 1783 only one major general, Henry Knox, remained in service until his resignation in June 1784. The rank was revived on March 4, 1791, when Arthur St. Clair was appointed as major general in command of the U.S. Army. St. Clair was succeeded by Major General Anthony Wayne who commanded the Army (then named the Legion of the United States) until his death on December 15, 1796. The rank was revived on July 19, 1798, when Alexander Hamilton and Charles C. Pinckney were commissioned as major generals during the Quasi War with France. The expanded Army was demobilized on June 15, 1800, when it was reduced to only four regiments of infantry and two of artillery commanded by a brigadier general.

The rank of major general was abolished in the U.S. Army by the Act of March 16, 1802, and restored by the Act of January 11, 1812, as preparations were being made for the War of 1812. Major general has been a rank in the U.S. Army ever since.

Until the American Civil War, major general was the highest rank that could be attained by an officer in the U.S. Army, though Winfield Scott had been given the brevet rank of lieutenant general in 1855. This was a consequence of the fact that at his death George Washington was officially listed as holding the rank of lieutenant general, rather than full general, and it was regarded as improper for an officer to hold a rank equal to or superior to Washington's. To address this anomaly, Washington was posthumously promoted by Congress to the rank of General of the Armies of the United States in 1976.

The position of Major General Commanding the Army was entitled to wear three stars according to General Order No. 6 of March 13, 1861. When Ulysses S. Grant was appointed lieutenant general on March 9, 1864, and took command of the Union forces, he used the three-star insignia formerly assigned to that position.

=== U.S. Marine Corps ===
There was no major general in the U.S. Marine Corps until Commandant Charles Heywood was specially promoted by Act of Congress in July 1902. From his retirement on October 3, 1903, brigadier general was again the highest rank in the Marine Corps until May 21, 1908, when the rank held by the commandant was raised to major general. It remained the highest rank in the Marine Corps until January 20, 1942, when the rank held by the commandant was raised to lieutenant general.

=== U.S. Air Force ===
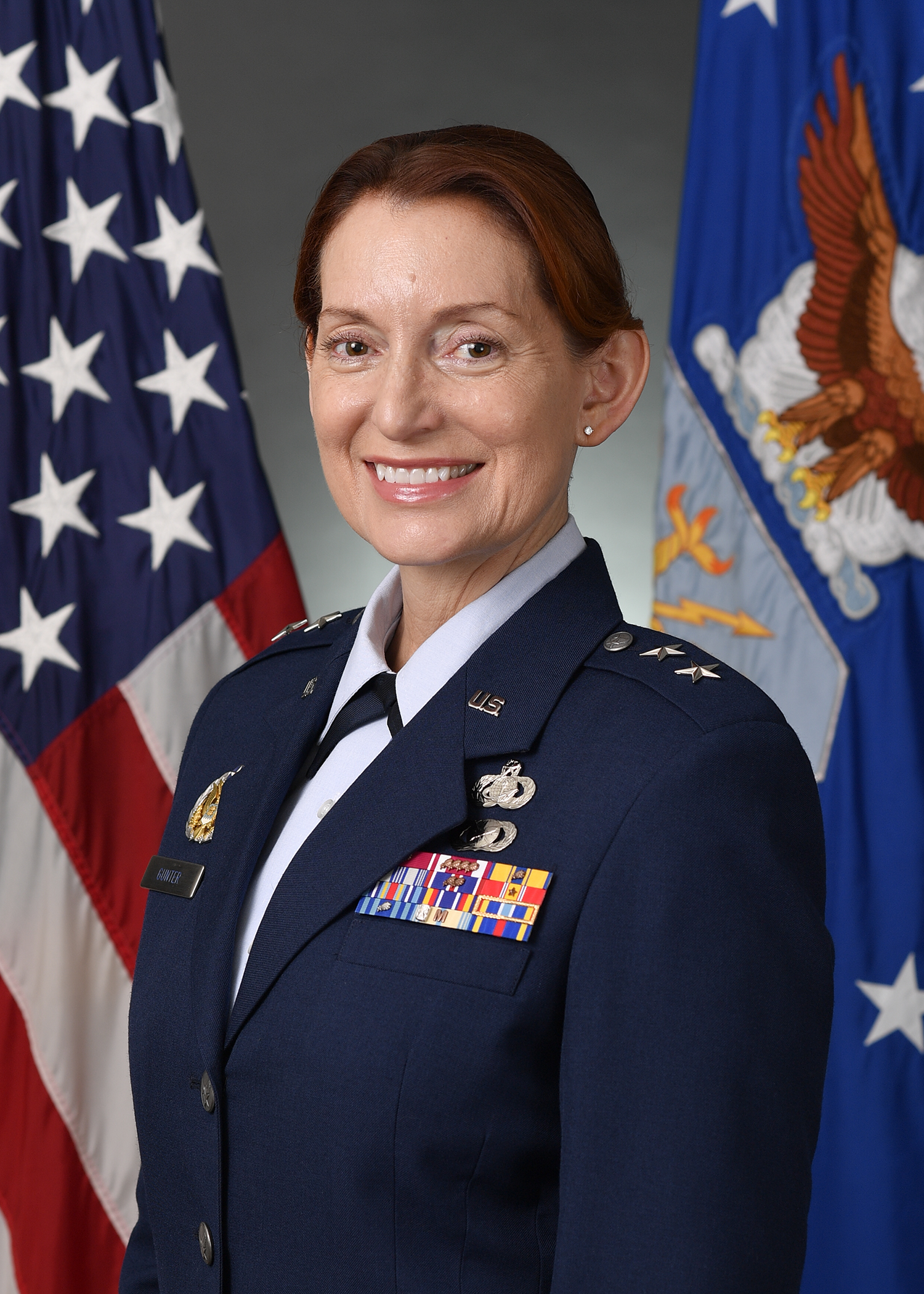
Maj Gen Anne B. Gunter (Air Force, 2023), wearing two-star insignia.

Given that the United States Air Force evolved from its predecessors, the United States Army Air Service, the United States Army Air Corps (1926–1941), and the United States Army Air Forces (1941–1947), the rank of major general in the Air Force coincides with its establishment as an independent service in 1947.

=== U.S. Space Force ===
The United States Space Force became independent of the U.S. Air Force on 20 December 2019 and has a similar rank structure which includes the rank of major general.

== See also ==
- List of major generals in the United States Regular Army before July 1, 1920
- List of United States military leaders by rank
- United States Air Force officer rank insignia
- United States Army officer rank insignia
- United States Marine Corps officer rank insignia
- United States Navy officer rank insignia
