= Publicist =

Someone who is responsible to generate publicity for a client or project

A publicist is a person whose job is to generate and manage publicity for a company, a brand, or public figure – especially a celebrity. Publicists are public relations specialists who maintain and represent the images of individuals, rather than representing an entire corporation or business. Publicists are also hired by public figures who want to maintain or protect their image. Publicists brand their clients by getting magazine, TV, newspaper, and website coverage. Most top-level publicists work in private practice, handling multiple clients.

The term publicist was coined by the legal scholar Francis Lieber to describe the engagement of internationalists with the public during the late nineteenth century. Publicists are sometimes called flacks, a term that traces back to Gene Flack, who was a well-known movie publicist in the 1930s.

== Types of publicists ==
- Press representative
- Public relations publicist – manages the public image of a client or a work of art such as a film.
- Special publicity consultant
- Unit publicist – The unit publicist brings attention to the production phase of making a film or other work of art by organizing media kits, sending out press releases, and arranging media visits to the production.
- Media agent – liaises between the ordinary person (interviewee) and publications or TV to 'sell' their story.

== Role of publicists ==
The main role of publicists is to get good press coverage for their clients. One way that publicists can do this is by sending press releases to journalists. A press release is written like a news story; including a headline, and attention grabbing quotes. However, because of the high traffic of e-mails, today, many press releases sent by publicists are lost within the other e-mails that journalists receive.

Publicists tend to have good working relationships with journalists, TV news producers, and producers. In order to have these relationships, publicists usually network with these media professionals. To protect a client's image, publicists will often ask journalists what questions will be asked during interviews to prevent any surprises and discussion of any unwanted topics.

Publicists determine how to manage a person's or brand's image by what is being said about them in the media. This pertains to websites and social media. More recently, publicists have the need to network with bloggers and scope out their websites to make sure the content on their client is appropriate. Celebrity publicists usually schedule their client's press tours, which includes everything from making the travel arrangements and locations.

== Skills used ==
Publicists are usually skilled writers, as well as motivated to promote individuals. Furthermore, publicists need to be able to handle the stress associated with crisis. For example, if a client is arrested for a DUI, they need to release press coverage with details explaining how the client will resolve the situation. In terms of education, publicists will often major in communications, journalism, or public relations in college. When starting out as a publicist, one will have to work their way up in regards to position. Usually, it is helpful that aspiring publicists intern at a public relations firm while at college to gain experience.

== Publicists in the Hollywood industry ==
Hollywood publicists create and manage relationships between film stars and the array of other media channels through which the identities of stars are circulated. Stars have a dual relationship with publicity, for they publicize films but also, and importantly in the freelance market, have an interest in self publicity. It is for the latter reason that while many stars continue to regard managers as an optional luxury, today the majority of stars in Hollywood hire publicists to manage their media visibility. In other words, celebrities hire publicists who will be able to get their name out to the public preferably in a positive light.

Compared to channels of paid advertising, publicity generates exposure which is relatively "free". Publicity is at work whenever stars make personal appearances at press conferences or film premieres, give television interviews, are displayed on magazine covers, or allow the press to cover a private event. Independent publicists include Hollywood stars and studios as their clients, alongside corporations and individuals from the worlds of entertainment, sports, finance, technology, retailing, and other business sectors.

The role of a publicist in Hollywood has changed in recent years. With the enormous increase of entertainment news outlets such as Perez Hilton, TMZ, and Page Six, it has become much more difficult for publicists to control negative stories. Publicists must also work harder to keep their star clients relevant in the media with entertainment options in Hollywood continuously growing. Even booking a star for an interview or on a television talk show has become a challenging task, because if something goes awry, the publicist and the star could both be highly criticized by the media.

== See also ==
- Press agent
- Promotion (marketing)
