= 5th Ohio Cavalry Regiment =

- Active: August 1861 – October 30, 1865
- Country: United States of America
- Allegiance: Union
- Branch: Union Army
- Type: Cavalry
- Size: 2,737 (total)
- Part of: Kilpatrick's Division, Cavalry Corps, Army of the Tennessee
- Engagements: American Civil War: Skirmish at Adamsville; Battle of Shiloh; Siege of Corinth; Vicksburg Campaign; Siege of Vicksburg; Third Battle of Chattanooga; Siege of Knoxville; Atlanta campaign; Sherman's March to the Sea; Carolinas campaign; Battle of Averasborough; Battle of Bentonville

Commanders
- Notable commanders: Col. Thomas T. Heath

The 5th Ohio Cavalry Regiment was a regiment of Union cavalry raised in seven counties in southwestern Ohio for service during the American Civil War. It primarily served in the Western Theater in several major campaigns of the Army of the Tennessee.

== Service record ==
=== Organization ===
The 5th Ohio Cavalry Regiment was commissioned as a three-years regiment under Colonel William H. H. Taylor. It was originally organized at Camp Dick Corwin, near Cincinnati, Ohio, between October 23 and November 14 as the 2nd Ohio Cavalry. Its designation was changed by Gov. William Dennison in mid-November 1861.

=== Field duty ===
The 5th Ohio Cavalry was sent to the front lines in February 1862, taking boats up the Tennessee River to the vicinity of Pittsburg Landing. From there, the regiment was part of a raid on Confederate supply lines in Mississippi. On March 15, the 5th encountered Confederates near the small Shiloh Chapel and skirmished with the enemy frequently over the next few weeks. In early April, it participated in the Battle of Shiloh, where it participated in a series of charges on enemy infantry columns. Subsequently, the 3rd Battalion of the regiment took part in the Siege of Corinth, Mississippi, in the army of Maj. Gen. William S. Rosecrans. After the evacuation, the entire regiment transferred its base of operations to Memphis, Tennessee.

On December 21, 1862, near what is today known as Michigan City, Mississippi, the 1st and 3rd Battalions fought against Confederates under Sterling Price and Earl Van Dorn at the Battle of Davis Mill, firing 200 rounds without changing position. In 1863 the 5th Ohio Cavalry guarded the Memphis & Charleston Railroad, and raided into Mississippi in support of Ulysses S. Grant's Vicksburg Campaign. Companies E, H, I, and K (under Major Joseph C. Smith) were at the Siege of Vicksburg serving in the XVI Corps.

In October, the regiment joined William T. Sherman's march to Chattanooga, Tennessee. It was present at the battles around Chattanooga, and went with Sherman to Knoxville. It then went back to Alabama and wintered at Huntsville.

In the spring of 1864, the 5th Ohio Cavalry participated in Sherman's Atlanta campaign. However, having lost most of its horses in hard service, the regiment acted as infantry. The regiment then was attached to Maj. Gen. Judson Kilpatrick's command and subsequently took part in Sherman's March to the Sea. At the Battle of Buck Head Creek on November 28, Kilpatrick was surprised and nearly captured, but the 5th Ohio Cavalry halted Wheeler's advance. The 5th also fought against Confederates near Waynesboro, Georgia, and at other places during the march to Savannah, arriving there in December.

In early 1865, the 5th Ohio Cavalry was part of the Carolinas campaign, skirmishing and raiding throughout its march through South Carolina and into North Carolina. It fought in two significant battles, taking severe casualties in both actions.

After the war ended, the 5th Ohio Cavalry remained on active duty for several months, performing picket duty in North Carolina until mustered out on October 30, 1865. The regiment lost during its term of service 1 officer and 26 enlisted men killed and mortally wounded, and 3 officers and 140 enlisted men by disease, for a total of 170 casualties.
