= Special Field Orders No. 120 =

Special Field Orders No. 120 (series 1864) were military orders issued during the American Civil War, on November 9, 1864, by Major General William Tecumseh Sherman of the Union Army. He issued these orders in preparation for his famous March to the Sea, also known as the Savannah Campaign.

== Orders ==
HDQRS. MIL. DIV. OF THE MISS.,
In the Field, Kingston, Ga.,
November 9, 1864.

I. For the purpose of military operations this army is divided into two wings, viz, the Right Wing, Maj. Gen. O. O. Howard commanding, composed of the Fifteenth and Seventeenth Corps; the Left Wing, Maj. Gen. H. W. Slocum commanding, the Fourteenth and Twentieth Corps.

II. The habitual order of march will be, wherever practicable, by four roads, as near parallel as possible and converging at points hereafter to be indicated in orders. The cavalry, Brigadier-General Kilpatrick commanding, will receive special orders from the commander-in-chief.

III. There will be no general train of supplies, but each corps will have its ammunition train and provision train distributed habitually as follows: Behind each regiment should follow one wagon and one ambulance; behind each brigade should follow a due proportion of ammunition wagons, provision wagons, and ambulances. In case of danger each army corps commander should change this order of march by having his advance and rear brigades unencumbered by wheels. The separate columns will start habitually at 7 a.m., and make about fifteen miles per day, unless otherwise fixed in orders.

IV. The army will forage liberally on the country during the march. To this end, each brigade commander will organize a good and sufficient foraging party, under the command of one or more discreet officers, who will gather, near the route traveled, corn or forage of any kind, meat of any kind, vegetables, corn-meal, or whatever is needed by the command, aiming at all times to keep in the wagons at least ten days’ provisions for the command and three days' forage. Soldiers must not enter the dwellings of the inhabitants, or commit any trespass, but during a halt or a camp they may be permitted to gather turnips, potatoes, and other vegetables, and to drive in stock in sight of their camp. To regular foraging parties must be intrusted the gathering of provisions and forage at any distance from the road traveled.

V. To army corps commanders alone is intrusted the power to destroy mills, houses, cotton-gins, &c., and for them this general principle is laid down: In districts and neighborhoods where the army is unmolested no destruction of such property should be permitted; but should guerrillas or bushwhackers molest our march, or should the inhabitants burn bridges, obstruct roads, or otherwise manifest local hostility, then army commanders should order and enforce a devastation more or less relentless according to the measure of such hostility.

VI. As for horses, mules, wagons, &c., belonging to the inhabitants, the cavalry and artillery may appropriate freely and without limit, discriminating, however, between the rich, who are usually hostile, and the poor or industrious, usually neutral or friendly. Foraging parties may also take mules or horses to replace the jaded animals of their trains, or to serve as pack-mules for the regiments or brigades. In all foraging, of whatever kind, the parties engaged will refrain from abusive or threatening language, and may, where the officer in command thinks proper, give written certificates of the facts, but no receipts, and they will endeavor to leave with each family a reasonable portion for their maintenance.

VII. Negroes who are able-bodied and can be of service to the several columns may be taken along, but each army commander will bear in mind that the question of supplies is a very important one and that his first duty is to see to them who bear arms.

VIII. The organization at once of a good pioneer battalion for each army corps, composed if possible of negroes, should be attended to. This battalion should follow the advance guard, should repair roads, and double them if possible, so that the columns will not be delayed after reaching bad places. Also, army commanders should study the habit of giving the artillery and wagons the road, and marching their troops on one side, and also instruct their troops to assist wagons at steep hills or bad crossings of streams.

IX. Capt. O. M. Poe, chief engineer, will assign to each wing of the army a pontoon train, fully equipped and organized, and the commanders thereof will see to its being properly protected at all times.

By order of Maj. Gen. W. T. Sherman:

L. M. DAYTON,
Aide-de-Camp.

== Publication in the Official Record ==
This order is part of the Official Records of the American Civil War. It can be found in Series I — Military Operations, Volume XXXIX, Part III, Pages 713–714. The volume was published in 1892.

== See also ==
- Sherman's Special Field Orders, No. 15
- Sherman's Special Field Orders, No. 119
- "Sherman's March to the Sea" in the New Georgia Encyclopedia
- Caudill, Edward, and Paul Ashdown. Sherman’s March in Myth and Memory. New York: Rowman & Littlefield Publishers, 2008.
- Frank, Lisa Tendrich. The Civilian War: Confederate Women and Union Soldiers during Sherman’s March. Baton Rouge: Louisiana State University Press, 2015.
- Huff, Lawrence. “‘A Bitter Draught We Have Had to Quaff’: Sherman’s March Through the Eyes of Joseph Addison Turner.” The Georgia Historical Quarterly 72, no. 2 (1988): 306–26.
- Marszalek, John F. Sherman’s March to the Sea. 1st ed. Abilene, TX: McWhiney Foundation Press, 2005.
- Rubin, Anne Sarah. Through the Heart of Dixie: Sherman’s March and American Memory. 1st ed. Chapel Hill: The University of North Carolina Press, 2014.
- Wills, Charles Wright, and Mary E. Kellogg. Army Life of an Illinois Soldier Including a Day-by-Day Record of Sherman’s March to the Sea : Letters and Diary of Charles W. Wills. Carbondale: Southern Illinois University Press, 1996.
