= David G. Swaim =

United States Army general

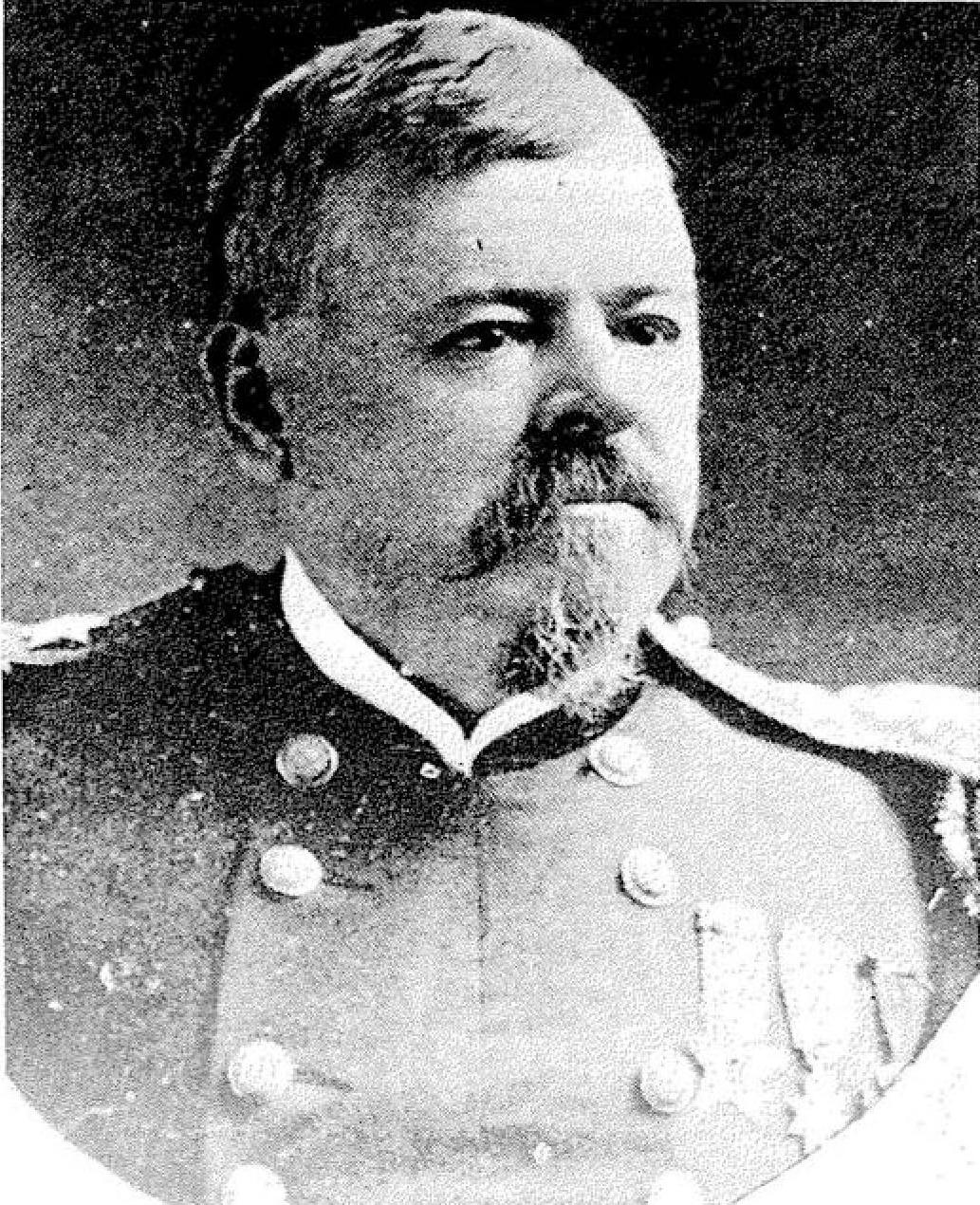

Judge Advocate General of the United States Army
- In office February 18, 1881 – December 22, 1894
- President: Rutherford B. Hayes; James A. Garfield; Chester A. Arthur; Grover Cleveland; Benjamin Harrison; Grover Cleveland
- Preceded by: William McKee Dunn
- Succeeded by: Guido Norman Lieber

Personal details
- Born: December 22, 1834 Salem, Ohio
- Died: August 17, 1897 (aged 62) Washington, D.C.

David Gaskill Swaim (December 22, 1834 – August 17, 1897) was Judge Advocate General of the United States Army from February 18, 1881, to December 22, 1894.

== Career ==
Born in Salem, Ohio, on December 22, 1834, Swaim became a lawyer in 1858. With the outbreak of the American Civil War, he joined the 65th Ohio Infantry as a first lieutenant. He was later promoted to adjutant of his regiment, and then acting adjutant of the brigade. He was wounded at the battles of Shiloh and Chickamauga and was promoted to captain.

When the war ended, he remained in the Army, serving in the Judge Advocate General's Corps until 1879, when President Rutherford B. Hayes appointed him Judge Advocate General and promoted him to brigadier general. Swaim had leapfrogged over judge advocates senior to him as a result of his relationship to President-elect James A. Garfield. This created a degree of enmity among the officers who served under Swaim’s supervision.

Swaim was present at Garfield's death due to an assassin's bullet, watching over him during his last moment of consciousness. Awaking to a great pain in his chest, Garfield requested a drink of water from Swaim. After finishing his glass, Garfield said, "Oh Swaim, this terrible pain—press your hand on it." As Swaim put his hand on Garfield's chest, Garfield's hands went up reflexively. Clutching his heart, he exclaimed, "Oh, Swaim, can't you stop this? Oh, oh, Swaim!" Those were Garfield's last words.

In United States v. Mason, Swaim advised President Chester Arthur that the court-martial did not possess jurisdiction over a sergeant who had tried to kill Garfield's assassin. Arthur disagreed and determined not to follow Swaim's advice. Instead, Arthur turned to Major Asa Bird Gardiner to argue to the Supreme Court that Mason's court-martial conviction should stand. This may have been the start of Swaim's downfall. He was a companion of the District of Columbia Commandery of the Military Order of the Loyal Legion of the United States.

Another basis for Swaim's ultimate downfall might have resided in his desire to enforce equal treatment for African-American soldiers and officers. As Judge Advocate General, he voided court-martial findings against Johnson Chesnut Whittaker. This action was confirmed by President Chester A. Arthur, but may have led to "ill will" against Swaim.

== Later life and death ==
In 1884, charges of financial improprieties were levied against him, and he was suspended from duty for ten years. President Grover Cleveland reinstated him, and he retired immediately afterward. He died three years later at his home in Washington, D.C. Two days after his death, Swaim was interred with military honors at Arlington National Cemetery on August 19, 1897.

== Sources ==
- David G. Swaim (August 18, 1897). "Death List of a Day" (PDF). The New York Times.
