= Oscar Montgomery Lieber =

American geologist (1830–1862)

Oscar Montgomery Lieber (8 September 1830, Boston, Massachusetts - 27 June 1862 Richmond, Virginia) was an American geologist.

== Biography ==
He was a son of jurist Francis Lieber. He was educated at the universities of Berlin and Göttingen, and the Freiberg School of Mines. He was state geologist of Mississippi from 1850 to 1851, engaged in the geological survey of Alabama from 1854 to 1855, and from 1856 until 1860 held the office of mineralogical, geological, and agricultural surveyor of South Carolina.

His first annual report of the last-mentioned survey was published in 1857, and the fourth and last in 1860. In 1860, he accompanied the American astronomical expedition to Labrador as geologist. At the beginning of the Civil War, he joined the Confederate army, and died of wounds that he received in the Battle of Williamsburg.

== Works ==
- The Assayer's Guide (Philadelphia, 1862)
- The Analytical Chemist's Assistant, translated from the German of Friedrich Wöhler's Beispiele zur Uebung in der analytischen Chemie, with an introduction (1852)
- Der Itacolumit, seine Begleiter und die Metallführing desselben (1860)

He was the author of various articles on mining in New York Mining Magazine.
