= Battle of Buckhead Creek =

Battle of the American Civil War

Coordinates: 32.8991°N 82.0255°W

- Part of the American Civil War
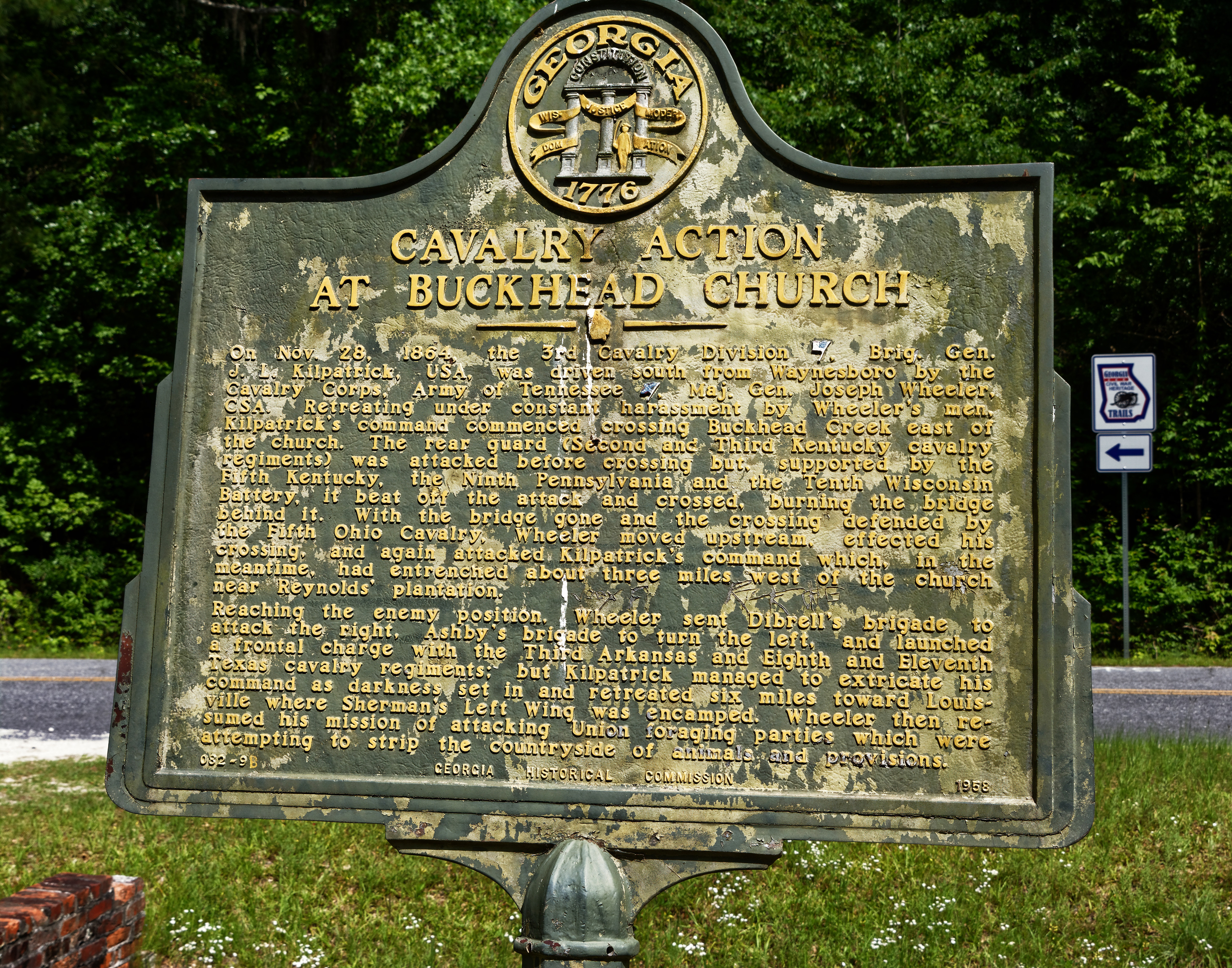
- Historical marker
Date	November 28, 1864
Location	Jenkins County, Georgia
Result	Union victory

Belligerents
United States (Union)	Confederate States (Confederacy)

Commanders and leaders
Hugh Judson Kilpatrick	Joseph Wheeler

Units involved
3rd Cavalry Division, Military Division of the Mississippi	Wheeler's Cavalry Corps, Department of South Carolina, Georgia and Florida

Strength
5,000	2,000

Casualties and losses
46	70 (Wheeler's report); 600 (Kilpatrick's report)

The Battle of Buckhead Creek (also spelled as Buck Head Creek) or Battle of Reynolds' Plantation was the second battle of Sherman's March to the Sea, fought November 28, 1864, during the American Civil War. Union Army cavalry under Brig. Gen. Hugh Judson Kilpatrick repulsed an attack by the small Confederate cavalry corps under Maj. Gen. Joseph Wheeler, but abandoned its attempt to destroy railroads and rescue Union prisoners of war.

== Battle ==
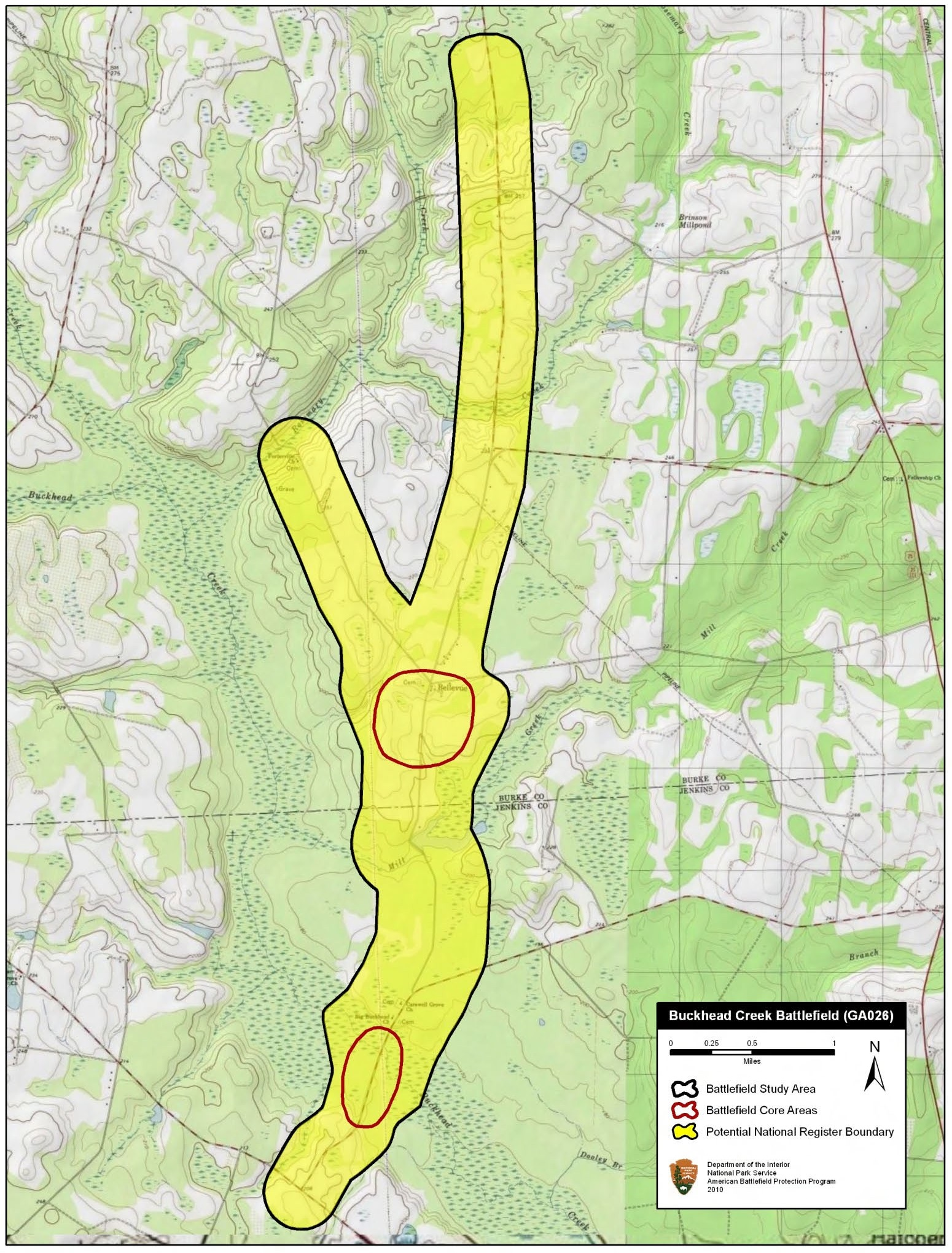
Map of Buckhead Creek Battlefield core and study areas by the American Battlefield Protection Program.

On November 26, Wheeler caught up with two lagging Union regiments, attacked their camp, chased them to the larger force and prevented Kilpatrick from destroying the Briar Creek trestle. Kilpatrick instead destroyed a mile of track in the area. When Kilpatrick discovered that the Union prisoners at Camp Lawton had been taken to other unknown sites, he began to move southwest to join up with Maj. Gen. William T. Sherman's headquarters.

Kilpatrick's men encamped near Buckhead Creek on the night of November 27. Wheeler came along the next morning, almost captured Kilpatrick, and pursued him and his men to Buckhead Creek. As Kilpatrick's main force crossed the creek, the 5th Ohio Cavalry regiment, under Col. Thomas T. Heath, supported by two artillery pieces, fought a rearguard action from behind a barricade of rails, severely punishing Wheeler's troopers with canister fire and then burned the bridge behind them. Wheeler soon crossed and followed, but a Union brigade behind barricades at Reynolds' Plantation halted the Rebels' drive, eventually forcing them to retire. Kilpatrick rode on to rejoin Sherman at Louisville, Georgia.

== Aftermath ==
Union casualties were reported as 46. Kilpatrick claimed/estimated 600 Confederate casualties, but Wheeler reported approximately 70, including Brig. Gen. Felix H. Robertson, severely wounded in the elbow.
