= Guido Norman Lieber =

United States Army general

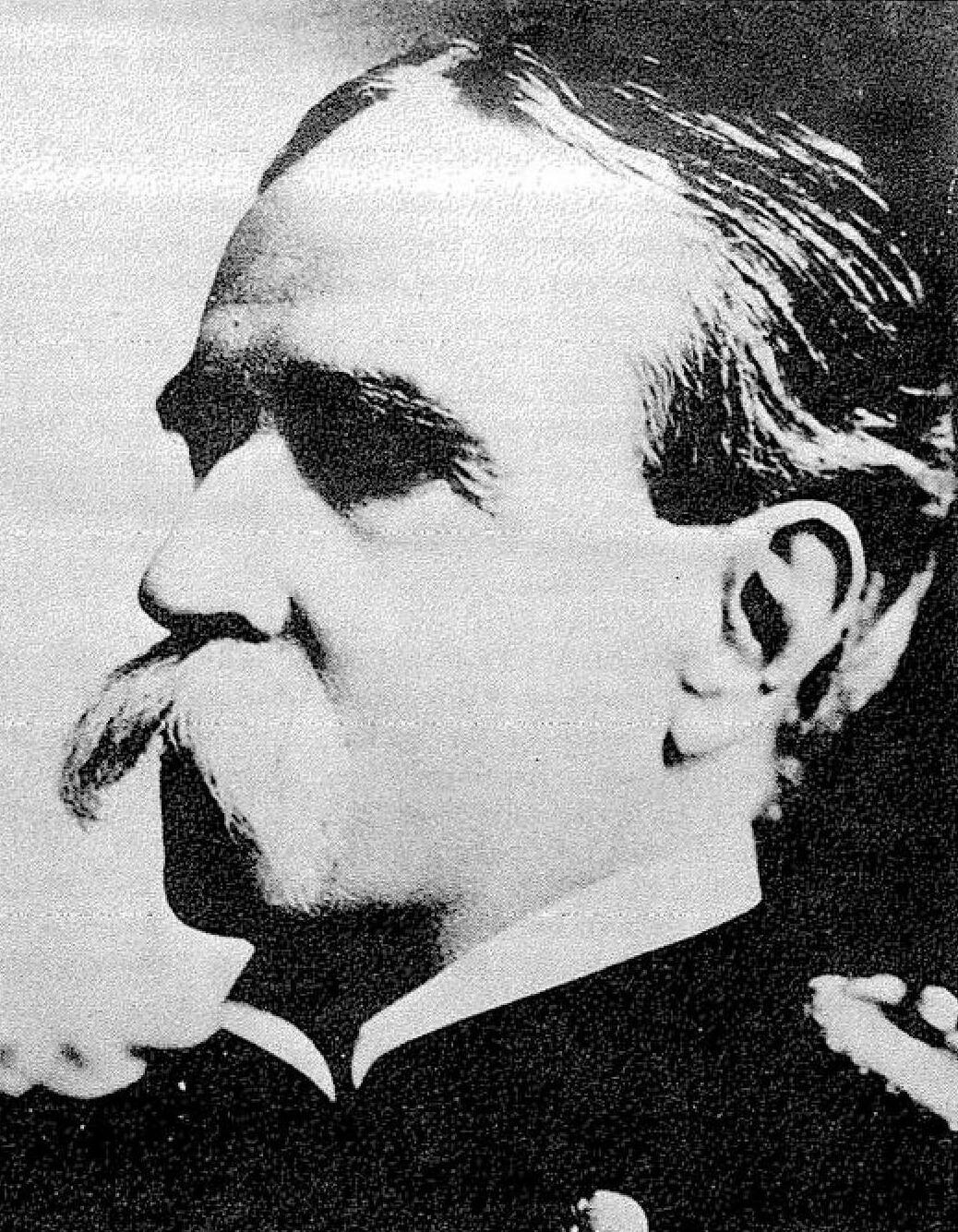

Judge Advocate General of the United States Army
- In office January 3, 1895 – May 21, 1901
- President: Grover Cleveland; William McKinley
- Preceded by: David G. Swaim
- Succeeded by: Thomas F. Barr

Personal details
- Born: May 21, 1837 Columbia, South Carolina, US
- Died: April 25, 1923 (aged 85)
- Resting place: Arlington National Cemetery
- Occupation: United States lawyer and jurist
- Known for: One of the founders of the military service institution

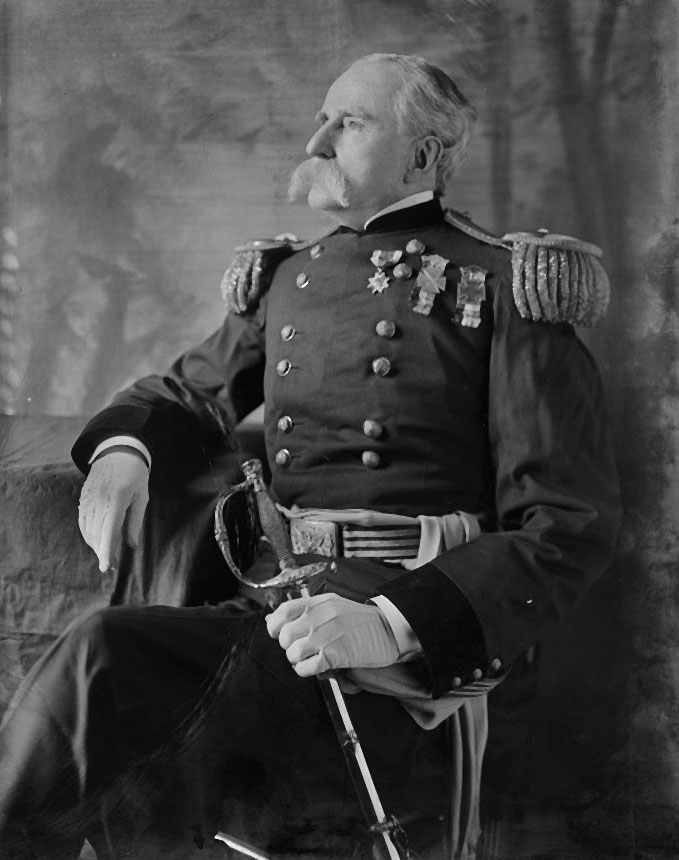
Guido Norman Lieber by Harris & Ewing.

Guido Norman Lieber (May 21, 1837 – April 25, 1923) was a United States Army lawyer and jurist.

== Biography ==
Lieber was born on May 21, 1837, in Columbia, South Carolina. He was the son of jurist Francis Lieber, who developed the Lieber Code governing the conduct of soldiers in wartime. He graduated from the University of South Carolina in 1856, and at Harvard Law School in 1859, and in that year was admitted to the bar of New York.

At the beginning of the Civil War he became 1st lieutenant in the 11th infantry, U.S. Army, and was appointed regimental adjutant, and served during the peninsular campaign under George B. McClellan, being brevetted captain for gallantry at the Battle of Gaines' Mill on June 27, 1862. He was with his regiment at the Second Battle of Bull Run, being then appointed aide-de-camp to the general-in-chief. In 1862 he was appointed major and judge advocate, and he served in this capacity in the Department of the Gulf, being present in the Teche and Red River campaigns. For gallantry during the latter he received another brevet, and he was brevetted a third time for services during the war. He also served as adjutant general of the department, and as judge of the provost court in New Orleans. He was then transferred to the Judge Advocate General's office in Washington.

He was appointed assistant to his father in the Bureau of Confederate Archives. He afterward served as judge advocate of various military departments and divisions, being, when stationed in New York, one of the founders of the Military service institution. He was professor of law at the U.S. Military Academy from 1878 until 1882, when he was assigned to duty in Washington in the Bureau of Military Justice. In 1884 he was appointed Assistant Judge Advocate General, with the rank of colonel, and was on duty as Acting Judge Advocate General of the U.S. Army. In 1895, he was promoted to brigadier general and served as Judge Advocate General until 1901, in which capacity he was one of the most valuable advisers of President William McKinley during the Spanish–American War.

Lieber was a member (Companion No. 05226) of the Military Order of the Loyal Legion of the United States, the first post-Civil War veterans' organization, founded by and for men who had served as commissioned officers in the armed forces of the Union.

== Works ==
His publications include several important treatises on the laws of war, such as The Use of the Army in Aid of the Civil Power (1898), and Remarks on the Army Regulations (1898).
