= Skirmish at Adamsville =

Battle of the American Civil War

- Part of the American Civil War
Date	April 1, 1862
Location	McNairy County, Tennessee
Result	Confederate victory

Belligerents
United States (Union)	(Confederate States of America) CSA (Confederacy)

Commanders and leaders
Lew Wallace	Albert Sidney Johnston

Strength
28	Unknown

Casualties and losses
3 killed, 1wounded	Unknown killed and wounded

The Skirmish at Adamsville was a minor battle in the American Civil War that was fought between the Union army and the Confederate army in McNairy County, Tennessee, on April 1, 1862. The battle resulted in a Confederate victory.

Shortly before the Battle of Shiloh in 1862, men under Union General Lew Wallace were stationed at Adamsville, Stoney Lonesome, and Crump's Landing in southwest Tennessee. On April 1, Lt. Charles H. Murray of the 5th Ohio Cavalry reported to Wallace that a skirmish near Adamsville ended in defeat for their Union detachment. Murray claimed that his forces were poorly armed and that they were outgunned by the Confederates. He also claimed that his men were very brave and stated that his men didn't flinch "until they had emptied their carbines and pistols.”
