= Lieber Code =

American code of conduct for warfare developed during the American Civil War

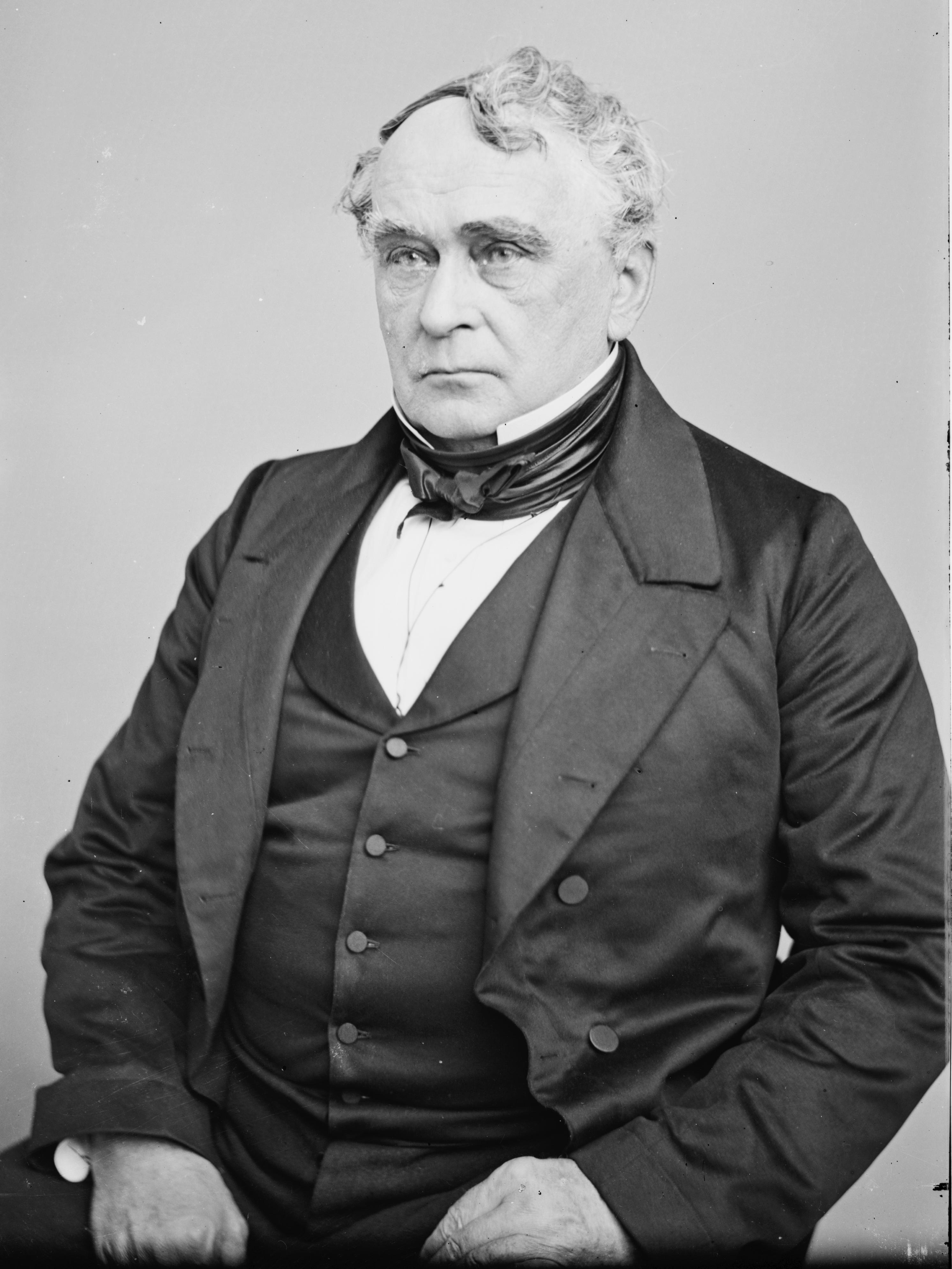
The jurist Franz Lieber, LL.D., modernized the military law of the 1806 Articles of War into the Lieber Code (General Orders No. 100, April 24, 1863) for the Union army to legitimately prosecute the civil war (1861–1865) begun by the Confederate States of America.

The Lieber Code (General Orders No. 100, April 24, 1863) was the military law that governed the wartime conduct of the Union army by defining and describing command responsibility for war crimes and crimes against humanity; and the military responsibilities of the Union soldier fighting in the American Civil War (April 12, 1861 – May 26, 1865) against the Confederate States of America (February 8, 1861 – May 9, 1865). The General Orders No. 100: Instructions for the Government of the Armies of the United States in the Field (Lieber Code) were written by Franz Lieber, a German lawyer, political philosopher, and combat veteran of the Napoleonic Wars.

== History ==
=== Background ===
At military age, the jurist Francis Lieber soldiered and fought in two wars, first for Prussia in the Napoleonic Wars (18 May 1803 – 20 November 1815) and then in the Greek War of Independence (21 February 1821 – 12 September 1829) from the Ottoman Empire (1299–1922). In his later career, Lieber was an academic at the College of South Carolina, in the southern region of United States of America. Although not personally an abolitionist, Lieber opposed slavery in principle and in practice because he had witnessed the brutalities of black chattel slavery in the South, from which he departed for New York City in 1857. In 1860, Professor Lieber taught history and political science at the Columbia Law School, and publicly lectured about the "Laws and Usages of War" proposing that the laws of war correspond to a legitimate purpose for the war.

During that time, Lieber had three sons who fought in the American Civil War (April 12, 1861 – May 26, 1865): one in the Confederate Army, who was killed at the Battle of Eltham's Landing (May 7, 1862), and two in the Union army. Later in 1862, in St. Louis, Missouri, while searching for the Union-soldier son wounded at the Battle of Fort Donelson (February 11–16, 1862), Lieber asked the help of his professional acquaintance Major General Henry W. Halleck, who had been a lawyer before the Civil War and was the author of International Law, or, Rules Regulating the Intercourse of States in Peace and War (1861), a book of political philosophy that emphasized legal correspondence between the casus belli and the purpose of the war.

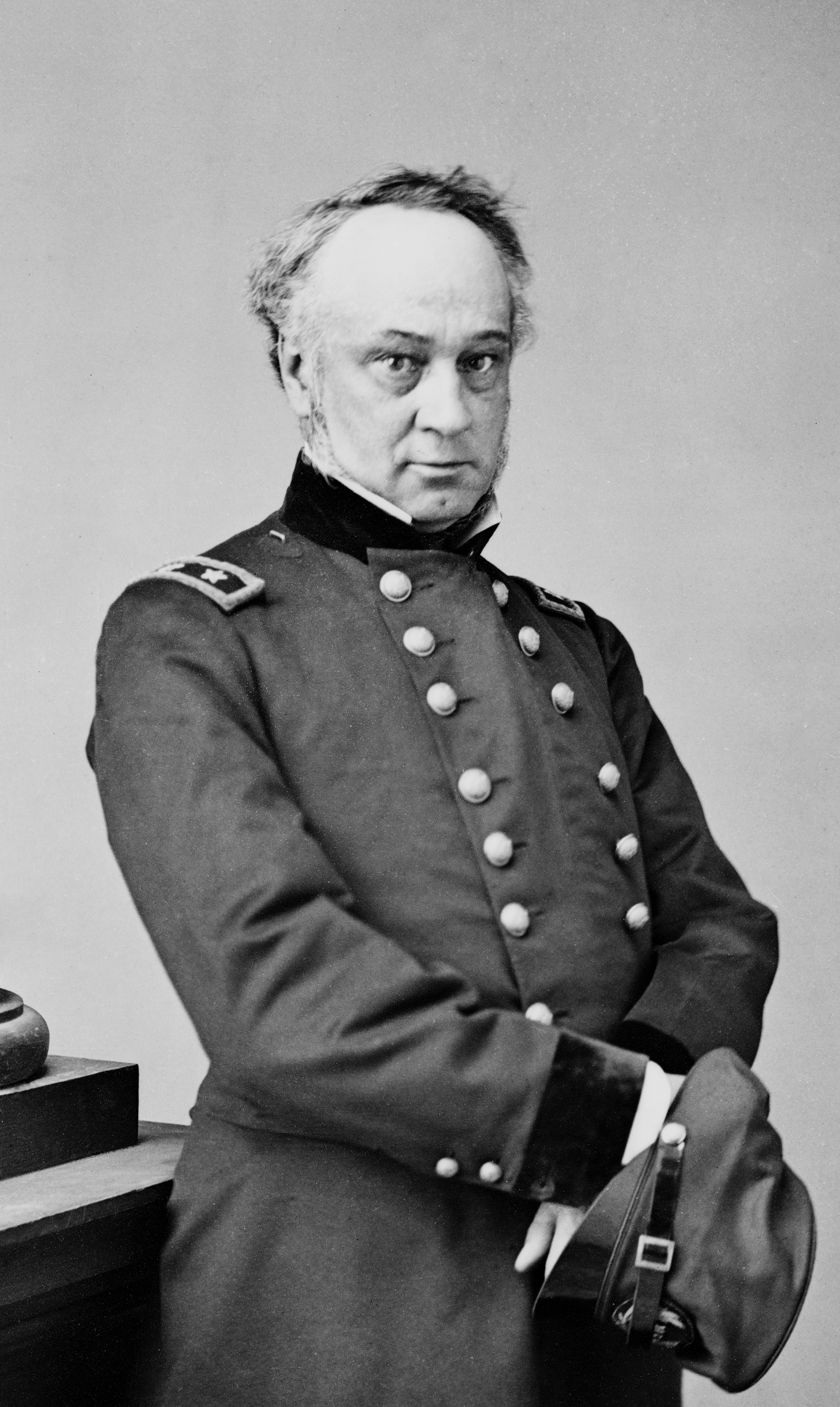
Gen. Henry W. Halleck commissioned the jurist Franz Lieber, LL.D., to modernize the military law of the 1806 Articles of War into General Orders No. 100 (1863), the Lieber Code, for the Union army to fight the guerrilla warfare of the Confederacy during the American Civil War (1861–1865).

=== Legal dilemma ===
In fighting the Confederate Army, guerrillas, and civilian collaborators of the Confederacy, Union army soldiers and officers faced ethical dilemmas of command responsibility concerning their summary execution in situ, per military custom, because the 1806 Articles of War did not address the management and disposition of prisoners of war and irregular fighters; nor the management and safe disposition of escaped black slaves – who were not to be repatriated to the Confederacy, per the Act Prohibiting the Return of Slaves (1862).

To resolve the lack of military authority in the 1806 Articles of War, Halleck, the Commanding General of the Union army, commissioned Lieber to write military laws specific to the modern warfare of the American Civil War. For the Union army's management and disposal of irregular fighters (guerrillas, spies, saboteurs, et al.), Lieber wrote the tract of military law Guerilla Parties Considered with Reference to the Laws and Usages of War (1862), which disallowed a soldier's POW-status to Confederate guerrillas and irregular fighters with three functional disqualifications: (i) guerrillas do not wear the army uniform of a belligerent party to the war; (ii) guerrillas have no formal chain of command, like a regular army unit; and (iii) guerrillas cannot take prisoners, as could an army unit.

At the end of 1862, General Halleck and War Secretary Stanton commissioned Lieber to revise the military law of the 1806 Articles of War to include the practical considerations of military necessity and the humanitarian needs of civilian populations under military occupation. The editorial-revision committee, Major General Ethan A. Hitchcock and Major General George Cadwalader, Major General George L. Hartsuff and Brigadier General John Henry Martindale, requested from Lieber comprehensive military laws to govern the Union army's prosecution of the Civil War. Gen. Halleck edited Lieber's military law to concur with the Emancipation Proclamation (1 January 1863), and, on April 24, 1863, President Lincoln promulgated General Orders No. 100, Instructions for the Government of the Armies of the United States in the Field, the Lieber Code.

== Legal provisions ==
For the Union army's prosecution of the American Civil War, General Order No. 100 (April 24, 1863) concerns the practical particulars of martial law, military jurisdiction, and the treatment of Confederate irregular fighters, such as spies, deserters, and prisoners of war. In the field practice of military justice, the unit commander held authority for any prosecution under the Lieber Code, which command authority included the summary execution of Confederate prisoners of war and war-criminal soldiers of the Union army. In the context of the American Civil War, the Lieber Code explains the concepts of military necessity and humanitarian needs in articles 14, 15, and 16 of Section I:

14. Military necessity, as understood by modern civilized nations, consists in the necessity of those measures which are indispensable for securing the ends of the war, and which are lawful according to the modern law and usages of war.
15. Military necessity admits of all direct destruction of life or limb of armed enemies, and of other persons whose destruction is incidentally unavoidable in the armed contests of the war; it allows of the capturing of every armed enemy, and every enemy of importance to the hostile government, or of peculiar danger to the captor; it allows of all destruction of property, and obstruction of the ways and channels of traffic, travel, or communication, and of all withholding of sustenance or means of life from the enemy; of the appropriation of whatever an enemy's country affords necessary for the subsistence and safety of the Army, and of such deception as does not involve the breaking of good faith either positively pledged, regarding agreements entered into during the war, or supposed by the modern law of war to exist. Men who take up arms against one another in public war do not cease on this account to be moral beings, responsible to one another and to God.
16. Military necessity does not admit of cruelty – that is, the infliction of suffering for the sake of suffering or for revenge, nor of maiming or wounding except in fight, nor of torture to extort confessions. It does not admit of the use of poison in any way, nor of the wanton devastation of a district. It admits of deception, but disclaims acts of perfidy; and, in general, military necessity does not include any act of hostility which makes the return to peace unnecessarily difficult.

In the late 19th century, the Lieber Code was the first modern codification of both customary international law and the law of war of Europe, and later was a basis for the Hague Convention of 1907, which restated and codified the practical particulars of that U.S. military law for application to international war among the signatory countries.

=== Ethical warfare ===
As the modernization of the 1806 Articles of War (An Act for Establishing Rules and Articles for the Government of the Armies of the United States), the Lieber Code defines and describes what is a state of civil war, what is military occupation, and explains the politico-military purposes of war; explains what are the permissible and the impermissible military means an army can employ to fight and win a war; and defines and describes the nature of the nation-state, the nature of national sovereignty, and what is rebellion.

The Code requires the humane, ethical treatment of civil populations under the military occupation of the Union army, and forbids the policy of killing prisoners of war – except when taking prisoners endangers the capturing unit. Moreover, concerning the ethics of fighting a civil war, Article 70, Section III stipulates that "the use of poison in any manner, be it to poison wells, or food, or arms, is wholly excluded from modern warfare. He that uses it puts himself out of the pale of the law and usages of war."

The Code forbids torture as warfare; thus Article 44, Section II prohibits "all wanton violence committed against persons in the invaded country, all destruction of property not commanded by the authorized officer, all robbery, all pillage or sacking, even after taking a place by main force, all rape, wounding, maiming, or killing of such inhabitants, are prohibited under the penalty of death, or such other severe punishment as may seem adequate for the gravity of the offense. A soldier, officer, or private, in the act of committing such violence, and disobeying a superior ordering him to abstain from it, may be lawfully killed on the spot by such superior."

=== Black prisoners of war ===
The Lieber Code military law concorded with the Emancipation Proclamation (1 January 1863) and prohibited racial discrimination against black soldiers of the Union army, specifically the Confederate Army denying them the rights and privileges of prisoners of war. Those stipulations of U.S. military law specifically addressed the Confederate government's proclamation that the Confederate Army would treat captured black soldiers of the Union army as escaped slaves, and not as prisoners of war, subject either to summary execution or to re-enslavement in the Confederacy; likewise, the white officers commanding the captured black soldiers would be denied prisoner-of-war status and would be arrested, tried, and condemned as common criminals for helping slaves escape human bondage.

=== Hard measures ===
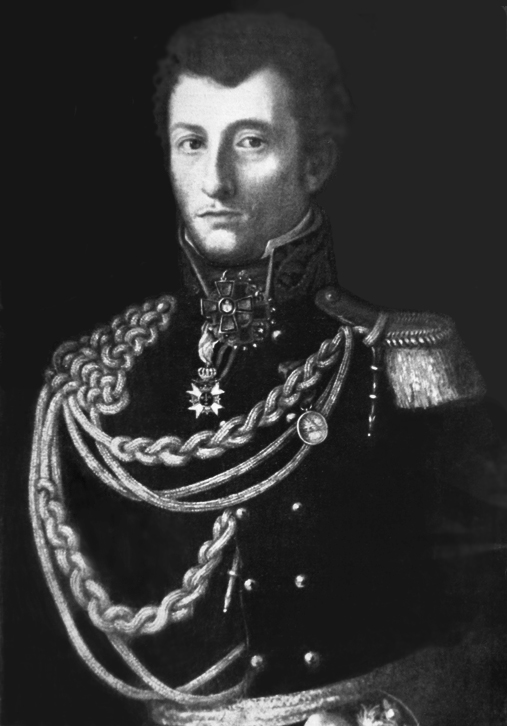
The Prussian military theoretician Carl von Clausewitz in uniform

Regarding a successful military occupation, the Lieber Code proposed a reciprocal relationship between the U.S. military authority and the Confederate civilian population, whose co-operation with the military authority would ensure considerations and good treatment for the civilian populace; that against guerrilla warfare and armed resistance to martial law the Union army would subject the insubordinate enemy civilians to imprisonment and death.

Moreover, to defend against the Confederate Army's violations of the laws of war by way of irregular fighters, the Lieber Code allowed retaliation by musketry against Confederate POWs, and allowed the summary execution of captured enemy civilians (spies, saboteurs, francs-tireurs, guerrillas) caught attacking the Union army and the United States.

In the 19th century, the Lieber Code legalized limited circumstances for retaliation against enemies for acts such as giving no quarter, reasoning "a reckless enemy ... leaves to his opponent no other means of securing himself against the repetition of barbarous outrage." (article 27) "Retaliation shall only be resorted to after careful inquiry into the real occurrence, and the character of the misdeeds that may demand retribution."(article 28)

However, retribution is limited: "Unjust or inconsiderate retaliation removes the belligerents farther and farther from the mitigating rules of regular war, and by rapid steps leads them nearer to the internecine wars of savages."(article 28)

As he believed war's ultimate goal is to bring peace, Lieber preferred for short wars fought and won with decisive warfare, as proposed in the strategy and tactics of the Prussian military science of Carl von Clausewitz. To that end, the Lieber Code legitimized and justified aggressive war to expand the operational range of the Union army's prosecution of the civil war to conquer the Confederacy and free the slaves.

=== Occupation of the Confederacy ===
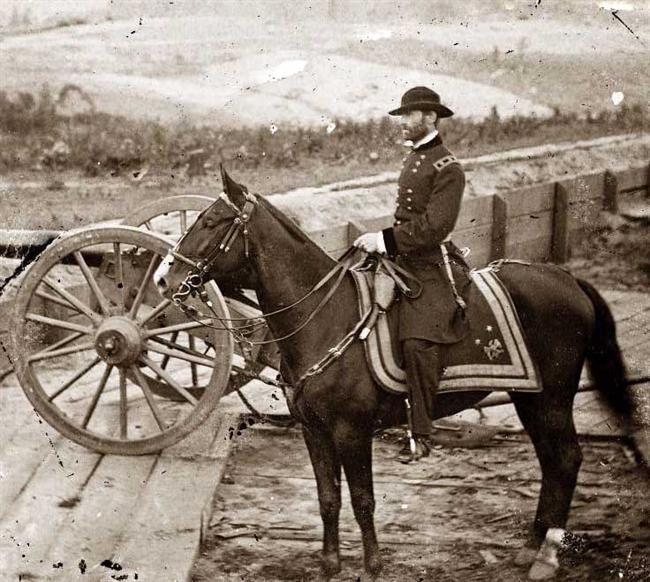
Gen. Sherman at Federal Fort No. 7, after the Atlanta Campaign, September 1864.

For the conquest and military occupation of the Confederate States of America (February 8, 1861 – May 9, 1865), General William Tecumseh Sherman based his Special Field Orders No. 120 (November 9, 1864) upon General Orders No. 100 (April 24, 1863) for the Union army. To realize a peaceful military occupation of the state of Georgia, Special Field Order No. 120 stipulated that "in districts and neighborhoods where the army is unmolested no destruction of such property should be permitted; but, should guerrillas or bushwhackers molest our march, or should the inhabitants burn bridges, obstruct roads, or otherwise manifest local hostility, then army commanders should order and enforce a devastation more or less relentless according to the measure of such hostility."

Moreover, the Lieber Code (General Orders No. 100, April 24, 1863) was the military law applied to the prosecution of war crimes and for equal prisoner-of-war exchanges between the Union army and the Confederate Army, regardless of the skin color of the soldier.

== Legacy ==
=== International law ===
In the late 19th century and in the early 20th century, the parties to the Hague Conventions of 1899 and 1907 used the Lieber Code (General Orders No. 100, April 24, 1863) as a basis for their legislation of the international law of war and the codification (definition and description) of what is a war crime and of what is a crime against humanity. In the mid 20th century, in the aftermath of the Second World War (1 September 1939 – 2 September 1945), at the war-crime Nuremberg Trials (20 November 1945 – 1 October 1946) and at the Tokyo Trials (29 April 1946 – 12 November 1948) the jurists determined that, by the year 1939, most governments in the world knew of the existence the law of war, agreed in Switzerland, and thus most governments knew the legal responsibilities of the belligerent parties, of neutral countries, and of the refugees from the war.

=== Philippine–American War ===
An abridged version of the Lieber Code was published in The War of the Rebellion: A Compilation of the Official Records of the Union and Confederate Armies (1899). Lieber's son, Guido Norman Lieber, was the Judge Advocate General of the Army (1895–1901), during the Spanish–American War (April 21 – August 13, 1898) and Philippine–American War (February 4, 1899 – July 2, 1902). The Lieber Code was the military law then applied for courts martial of American military personnel, and for litigation against the Filipino natives and against the Filipino revolutionaries fighting the U.S. occupation of the Philippine Islands; e.g. the unlawful concentration camps of General J. Franklin Bell and war-crime trial of Littleton Waller.

=== U.S. Law of War Manual ===
In 2015, the United States Department of Defense published its Law of War Manual. It was updated and revised in July 2023. The Manual explicitly refers to the Lieber Code, and the Lieber Code's influence on the Law of War Manual is apparent throughout.

It has been noted that the Law of War Manual — in the part where it states that "Persons Placed Hors de Combat" (individuals who are out of combat) may not lawfully be attacked once they have surrendered or been incapacitated — stands in conflict with statements, within the U.S. chain of command, according to which an order of "no quarter, no mercy" has been issued. Even if the Lieber Code were considered merely a formalization of internal U.S. rules of engagement, a normative conflict, with this kind of statements, would nonetheless exist.

== See also ==
- Command responsibility
- International criminal law
