= List of brigadier generals in the United States Regular Army before February 2, 1901 =

This is a complete list of brigadier generals in the United States Regular Army before February 2, 1901. The grade of brigadier general (or one-star general) is ordinarily the fourth-highest in the peacetime Army, ranking above colonel and below major general (two-star general).

The grade of brigadier general was the highest peacetime rank in the Regular Army during the late eighteenth and early nineteenth centuries, and the second-highest for most of the nineteenth and early twentieth centuries. It was also rare: until 1901 there were fewer than twenty brigadier generals on active duty at any given time. Even during times of war, the number of Regular Army brigadier generals remained relatively constant, because rather than expand the permanent military establishment to meet transient wartime requirements, the Regular Army served as a cadre for a much larger temporary force of volunteers and conscripts. Many famous generals of the American Civil War held high rank only in the volunteer service, and reverted to much lower permanent grades in the Regular Army when the volunteers were disbanded after the war.

The number of Regular Army brigadier generals increased dramatically when the Army was reorganized after the Spanish–American War. In addition to increasing the number of brigadier generals of the line from six to fifteen, the Army instituted a practice of funneling a succession of senior colonels through each vacancy in the grade of brigadier general, each officer in turn being promoted and retired at the higher rank and retired pay after only one day in grade. The reorganization took effect on February 2, 1901.

== Taxonomy ==
Historically, the United States Army included two components: the permanently established Regular Army, which constituted the peacetime force; and, during time of war, a much larger non-permanent establishment comprising various volunteer, conscript, and federalized state forces.

There were two types of brigadier generals in the Regular Army:

- A brigadier general of the line was an officer who was commissioned in the permanent grade of brigadier general and therefore maintained that personal rank regardless of assignment.
- A brigadier general of the staff was an officer who held the ex officio rank of brigadier general only while occupying an office designated by statute to carry that rank.

Brigadier generals in the non-permanent or non-federal establishments included the following:

- A brigadier general of militia was appointed or elected to that rank in one of the state militia forces.
- A brigadier general of levies was appointed to that rank in the federal volunteer forces raised during the Northwest Indian War.
- A brigadier general of volunteers was appointed to that rank in the United States Volunteers during the War of 1812, the Mexican War, the Civil War, or the Spanish–American War.
- A brigadier general of state volunteers was appointed to that rank in one of the non-federal volunteer forces raised by individual states during the War of 1812, the Mexican War, the Civil War, or the Spanish–American War.
- A brigadier general in the Provisional Army was appointed to that rank in the non-permanent Regular Army augmentation force called the Provisional Army of the United States authorized during the Quasi-War by the Act of May 28, 1798.
- A brigadier general in the Eventual Army was appointed to that rank in the non-permanent Regular Army augmentation force called the Eventual Army of the United States authorized during the Quasi-War by the Act of March 2, 1799.

Brigadier generals in other establishments included the following:

- A brigadier general in the Continental Army was appointed to that rank in the United States Army's predecessor organization during the American Revolution.
- A brigadier general in the Army of the Confederate States of America was the Confederate States Army equivalent of a Regular Army brigadier general during the Civil War.
- A brigadier general in the Provisional Army of the Confederate States was the Confederate States Army equivalent of a brigadier general of volunteers during the Civil War.

In addition, honorary brevet ranks of brigadier general were conferred in several organizations:

- A brevet brigadier general was awarded that brevet rank in the Regular Army, typically for actions in the War of 1812, the Mexican War, or the Civil War.
- A brevet brigadier general of volunteers was awarded that brevet rank in the United States Volunteers, typically for actions in the Civil War or the Spanish–American War.
- A brevet brigadier general of militia was awarded that brevet rank in one of the state militia forces.

== List of brigadier generals before February 2, 1901 ==
The following list of brigadier generals includes all officers appointed to that rank in the line or staff of the United States Regular Army prior to February 2, 1901. It does not include officers who held that rank solely by brevet or in the non-permanent or non-federal establishments, such as brigadier generals of militia or volunteers.

Entries are indexed by the numerical order in which each officer was appointed to that rank while on active duty, or by an asterisk (*) if the officer did not serve in that rank while on active duty. Each entry lists the officer's name; date of rank; date the officer vacated the active-duty rank; number of years on active duty as brigadier general (Yrs); and other biographical notes.

	Name	Date of rank	Date vacated	Yrs	Notes
1	James Wilkinson	5 Mar 1792	2 Mar 1813	21	(1757–1825) Promoted to major general, 2 Mar 1813. Continental Army brevet brigadier general, 6 Nov 1777–6 Mar 1778; brigadier general of Pennsylvania militia, 1782–1784.
2	John Brooks	11 Apr 1792	1 Nov 1796	5	(1752–1825) Major general of Massachusetts militia, 1786–1796.
3	Rufus Putnam	4 May 1792	14 Feb 1793	1	(1738–1824) Continental Army brigadier general, 7 Jan 1783–3 Nov 1783.
4	Thomas Posey	14 Feb 1793	28 Feb 1794	1	(1750–1818) Major general of Kentucky militia, 1809–1810.
5	William Washington	19 Jul 1798	15 Jun 1800	2	(1752–1810) Brigadier general of South Carolina militia, 1794.
6	William North	19 Jul 1798	15 Jun 1800	2	(1755–1836) Adjutant General.
7	Wade Hampton	15 Feb 1809	2 Mar 1813	4	(1752–1835) Promoted to major general, 2 Mar 1813.
8	Peter Gansevoort	15 Feb 1809	2 Jul 1812	3	(1749–1812) Brigadier general of New York militia, 26 Mar 1781, and major general, 8 Oct 1793. Died in office.
9	Joseph Bloomfield	27 Mar 1812	15 Jun 1815	3	(1753–1823) Brigadier general of New Jersey militia, 1794.
10	James Winchester	27 Mar 1812	31 Mar 1815	3	(1752–1826) Brigadier general of North Carolina militia, 1788; of Tennessee militia, 1796.
11	Morgan Lewis	3 Apr 1812	2 Mar 1813	1	(1754–1844) Quartermaster General. Promoted to major general, 2 Mar 1813.
12	William Hull	8 Apr 1812	25 Apr 1814	2	(1753–1825) Dismissed.
13	Thomas Flournoy	18 Jun 1812	13 Sep 1814	2	(1775–1857)
14	Thomas H. Cushing	2 Jul 1812	15 Jun 1815	3	(1755–1822) Brigadier general detailed as Adjutant General, 6 Jul 1812–12 Mar 1813.
15	John Armstrong Jr.	6 Jul 1812	13 Jan 1813	1	(1758–1843)
16	Alexander Smyth	6 Jul 1812	3 Mar 1813	1	(1765–1830) Inspector General. Legislated out.
17	John Chandler	8 Jul 1812	15 Jun 1815	3	(1760–1841) Major general of Massachusetts militia, Feb 1812–Nov 1812.
18	William Henry Harrison	22 Aug 1812	2 Mar 1813	1	(1773–1841) Promoted to major general, 2 Mar 1813. Brevet major general of Kentucky militia, 20 Aug 1812–31 Aug 1812. Awarded Thanks of Congress, 1818.
19	John P. Boyd	26 Aug 1812	15 Jun 1815	3	(1764–1830)
20	Zebulon M. Pike	12 Mar 1813	27 Apr 1813	0	(1779–1813) Adjutant and Inspector General. Killed in action at Battle of York.
21	Thomas Parker	12 Mar 1813	1 Mar 1814	1	(1753–1820)
22	George Izard	12 Mar 1813	24 Jan 1814	1	(1776–1828) Promoted to major general, 24 Jan 1814.
23	William H. Winder	12 Mar 1813	15 Jun 1815	2	(1775–1824) Brigadier general detailed as Adjutant and Inspector General, 19 May 1814–2 Jul 1814.
24	Duncan McArthur	12 Mar 1813	15 Jun 1815	2	(1772–1839) Major general of Ohio militia, 20 Feb 1808.
25	Lewis Cass	12 Mar 1813	6 Apr 1814	1	(1782–1866) Major general of Ohio militia, Dec 1812.
26	Benjamin Howard	12 Mar 1813	18 Sep 1814	2	(1760–1814) Died in office.
27	Robert Swartwout	21 Mar 1813	5 Jun 1816	3	(1778–1848) Quartermaster General.
28	David R. Williams	9 Jul 1813	6 Apr 1814	1	(1776–1830)
29	Jacob J. Brown	19 Jul 1813	24 Jan 1814	1	(1775–1828) Promoted to major general, 24 Jan 1814. Brigadier general of New York volunteers, 12 Jun 1813–19 Jul 1813. Awarded Thanks of Congress and Congressional Gold Medal, 1814.
30	Leonard Covington	1 Aug 1813	14 Nov 1813	0	(1768–1813) Mortally wounded at Battle of Crysler's Farm.
31	Alexander Macomb	24 Jan 1814	1 Jun 1821	7	(1782–1841) Retained as Chief of Engineers with rank of colonel, 1 Jun 1821. Promoted to major general, 24 May 1828. Brevet major general, 11 Sep 1814. Awarded Thanks of Congress and Congressional Gold Medal, 1814.
32	Thomas A. Smith	24 Jan 1814	17 May 1815	1	(1781–1844) Brevet brigadier general, 14 Jan 1814.
33	Daniel Bissell	9 Mar 1814	17 May 1815	1	(1768–1833) Retained as colonel of infantry, 17 May 1815. Brevet brigadier general, 9 Mar 1814.
34	Edmund P. Gaines	9 Mar 1814	6 Jun 1849	35	(1777–1849) Brevet major general, 15 Aug 1814. Awarded Thanks of Congress and Congressional Gold Medal, 1814. Died in office.
35	Winfield Scott	9 Mar 1814	25 Jun 1841	27	(1786–1866) Promoted to major general, 25 Jun 1841. Brevet major general, 25 Jul 1814; brevet lieutenant general, 29 Mar 1847.
36	Eleazar W. Ripley	15 Apr 1814	1 Feb 1820	6	(1782–1839) Brevet major general, 25 Jul 1814. Awarded Thanks of Congress and Congressional Gold Medal, 1814.
37	Andrew Jackson	19 Apr 1814	1 May 1814	0	(1767–1845) Promoted to major general, 1 May 1814. Major general of Tennessee militia, 1 Apr 1803–30 May 1814; major general of volunteers, 10 Dec 1812–30 May 1814. Awarded Thanks of Congress and Congressional Gold Medal, 1815.
38	Daniel Parker	22 Nov 1814	1 Jun 1821	7	(1782–1846) Retained as Paymaster General, 1 Jun 1821. Adjutant and Inspector General.
39	Thomas S. Jesup	8 May 1818	1 Jun 1860	42	(1788–1860) Quartermaster General. Brevet major general, 8 May 1828. Died in office.
40	Henry Atkinson	13 May 1820	1 Jun 1821	1	(1782–1842) Retained as colonel adjutant general, 1 Jun 1821, but declined; assigned as colonel of infantry to rank from 15 Apr 1814. Brevet brigadier general, 13 May 1820.
41	John E. Wool	25 Jun 1841	16 May 1862	21	(1784–1869) Promoted to major general, 16 May 1862. Brevet brigadier general, 29 Apr 1826; brevet major general, 23 Feb 1847. Awarded Thanks of Congress and Congressional Sword, 1854.
42	David E. Twiggs	30 Jun 1846	1 Mar 1861	15	(1790–1862) Confederate States Provisional Army major general, 22 May 1861–15 Jul 1862. Brevet brigadier general, 30 Jun 1846; brevet major general, 23 Sep 1846. Awarded Congressional Sword, 1847. Dismissed.
43	Stephen W. Kearny	30 Jun 1846	31 Oct 1848	2	(1794–1848) Brevet major general, 6 Dec 1846. Died in office.
44	Franklin Pierce	3 Mar 1847	20 Mar 1848	1	(1804–1869)
45	George Cadwalader	3 Mar 1847	20 Jul 1848	1	(1806–1879) Major general of Pennsylvania volunteers, 19 Apr 1861–19 Jul 1861; major general of volunteers, 25 Apr 1862–5 Jul 1865. Brevet major general, 13 Sep 1847.
46	Enos D. Hopping	3 Mar 1847	1 Sep 1847	0	(1805–1847) Died in office.
47	Persifor F. Smith	30 Dec 1856	17 May 1858	1	(1798–1858) Brigadier general of Louisiana volunteers, 15 May 1846. Brevet brigadier general, 23 Sep 1846; brevet major general, 20 Aug 1847. Died in office.
48	William S. Harney	14 Jun 1858	1 Aug 1863	5	(1800–1889) Brevet brigadier general, 18 Apr 1847; brevet major general, 13 Mar 1865.
49	Joseph E. Johnston	28 Jun 1860	22 Apr 1861	1	(1807–1891) Quartermaster General. Major general of Virginia militia, 23 Apr 1861–27 Apr 1861; Provisional Army of Virginia major general, 27 Apr 1861–4 May 1861, and brigadier general, 4 May 1861 – 14 May 1861; Confederate States Army brigadier general, 14 May 1861–4 Jul 1861, and general, 4 Jul 1861–2 May 1865.
50	Edwin V. Sumner	16 Mar 1861	21 Mar 1863	2	(1797–1863) Major general of volunteers, 4 Jul 1862–21 Mar 1863. Brevet major general, 31 May 1862. Died in office.
51	Joseph K. F. Mansfield	14 May 1861	18 Sep 1862	1	(1803–1862) Major general of volunteers, 18 Jul 1862–18 Sep 1862. Brevet brigadier general, 6 May 1861. Mortally wounded at Battle of Antietam.
52	Irvin McDowell	14 May 1861	25 Nov 1872	12	(1818–1885) Promoted to major general, 25 Nov 1872. Major general of volunteers, 14 Mar 1862–1 Sep 1866. Brevet major general, 14 Mar 1865.
53	Robert Anderson	15 May 1861	27 Oct 1863	2	(1805–1871) Brevet major general, 3 Feb 1865.
54	Montgomery C. Meigs	15 May 1861	6 Feb 1882	21	(1816–1892) Quartermaster General. Brevet major general, 5 Jul 1864.
55	William S. Rosecrans	16 May 1861	28 Mar 1867	6	(1819–1898) Major general of volunteers, 21 Mar 1862–15 Jan 1866. Brevet major general, 13 Mar 1865. Awarded Thanks of Congress, 1863.
56	Lorenzo Thomas	3 Aug 1861	22 Feb 1869	8	(1804–1875) Adjutant General. Brevet brigadier general, 7 May 1861; brevet major general, 13 Mar 1865.
57	James W. Ripley	3 Aug 1861	15 Sep 1863	2	(1794–1870) Chief of Ordnance. Brevet brigadier general, 4 Jul 1861; brevet major general, 13 Mar 1865.
58	Philip S. G. Cooke	12 Nov 1861	29 Oct 1873	12	(1809–1895) Brigadier general of volunteers, 12 Nov 1861–28 Nov 1861. Brevet major general, 13 Mar 1865.
*	Clement A. Finley	14 Apr 1862	(none)	0	(1797–1879) Brevet brigadier general, 13 Mar 1865.
59	William A. Hammond	25 Apr 1862	18 Aug 1864	2	(1828–1900) Surgeon General. Dismissed.
60	John Pope	14 Jul 1862	26 Oct 1882	20	(1822–1892) Promoted to major general, 26 Oct 1882. Brigadier general of volunteers, 17 May 1861–21 Mar 1862; major general of volunteers, 21 Mar 1862–1 Sep 1866. Brevet major general, 13 Mar 1865.
61	Joseph Hooker	20 Sep 1862	15 Oct 1868	6	(1814–1879) Retired as major general, 15 Oct 1868. Brigadier general of volunteers, 17 May 1861 – 5 May 1862; major general of volunteers, 5 May 1862–1 Sep 1866. Brevet major general, 13 Mar 1865. Awarded Thanks of Congress, 1864.
62	Joseph P. Taylor	9 Feb 1863	29 Jun 1864	1	(1796–1864) Commissary General of Subsistence. Died in office.
63	Joseph G. Totten	3 Mar 1863	22 Apr 1864	1	(1788–1864) Chief of Engineers. Brevet brigadier general, 28 Mar 1847; brevet major general, 21 Apr 1864. Died in office.
64	George G. Meade	3 Jul 1863	18 Aug 1864	1	(1815–1872) Promoted to major general, 18 Aug 1864. Brigadier general of volunteers, 31 Aug 1861–29 Nov 1862; major general of volunteers, 29 Nov 1862–18 Aug 1864. Awarded Thanks of Congress, 1864 and 1865.
65	William T. Sherman	4 Jul 1863	12 Aug 1864	1	(1820–1891) Promoted to major general, 12 Aug 1864; to lieutenant general, 25 Jul 1866; to general, 4 Mar 1869. Brigadier general of volunteers, 17 May 1861 – 1 May 1862; major general of volunteers, 1 May 1862–12 Aug 1864. Awarded Thanks of Congress, 1864.
66	James B. McPherson	1 Aug 1863	22 Jul 1864	1	(1828–1864) Brigadier general of volunteers, 15 May 1862–8 Oct 1862; major general of volunteers, 8 Oct 1862–22 Jul 1864. Killed in action at Battle of Atlanta.
67	George D. Ramsay	15 Sep 1863	12 Sep 1864	1	(1802–1882) Chief of Ordnance. Brevet major general, 13 Mar 1865.
68	George H. Thomas	27 Oct 1863	15 Dec 1864	1	(1816–1870) Promoted to major general, 15 Dec 1864. Brigadier general of volunteers, 3 Aug 1861–25 Apr 1862; major general of volunteers, 25 Apr 1862–15 Dec 1864. Awarded Thanks of Congress, 1865.
69	James B. Fry	21 Apr 1864	27 Aug 1866	2	(1827–1894) Provost Marshal General. Brevet brigadier general and brevet major general, 13 Mar 1865.
70	Richard Delafield	22 Apr 1864	8 Aug 1866	2	(1798–1873) Chief of Engineers. Brevet major general, 13 Mar 1865.
71	Joseph Holt	22 Jun 1864	1 Dec 1875	11	(1807–1894) Judge Advocate General.
72	Amos B. Eaton	29 Jun 1864	1 May 1874	10	(1806–1877) Commissary General of Subsistence. Brevet major general, 13 Mar 1865. Died in office.
73	Winfield S. Hancock	12 Aug 1864	26 Jul 1866	2	(1824–1886) Promoted to major general, 26 Jul 1866. Brigadier general of volunteers, 23 Sep 1861–29 Nov 1862; major general of volunteers, 29 Nov 1862–26 Jul 1866. Brevet major general, 13 Mar 1865. Awarded Thanks of Congress, 1866.
74	Joseph K. Barnes	22 Aug 1864	30 Jun 1882	18	(1817–1883) Surgeon General. Brevet major general, 13 Mar 1865.
75	Alexander B. Dyer	12 Sep 1864	20 May 1874	10	(1815–1874) Chief of Ordnance. Brevet major general, 13 Mar 1865. Died in office.
76	Philip H. Sheridan	20 Sep 1864	8 Nov 1864	0	(1831–1888) Promoted to major general, 8 Nov 1864; to lieutenant general, 4 Mar 1869; to general, 1 Jun 1888. Brigadier general of volunteers, 1 Jul 1862–31 Dec 1862; major general of volunteers, 31 Dec 1862–8 Nov 1864. Awarded Thanks of Congress, 1865.
77	John M. Schofield	30 Nov 1864	4 Mar 1869	4	(1831–1906) Promoted to major general, 4 Mar 1869; to lieutenant general, 8 Feb 1895. Brigadier general of volunteers, 21 Nov 1861–29 Nov 1862 and 4 Mar 1863–12 May 1863; major general of volunteers, 29 Nov 1862–4 Mar 1863 and 12 May 1863–1 Sep 1866. Brevet major general, 13 Mar 1865. Awarded Medal of Honor, 1861.
78	Oliver O. Howard	21 Dec 1864	19 Mar 1886	21	(1830–1909) Promoted to major general, 19 Mar 1886. Brigadier general of volunteers, 3 Sep 1861–29 Nov 1862; major general of volunteers, 29 Nov 1862–1 Jan 1869. Brevet major general, 13 Mar 1865. Awarded Medal of Honor, 1862; Thanks of Congress, 1864.
79	Alfred H. Terry	15 Jan 1865	3 Mar 1886	21	(1827–1890) Promoted to major general, 3 Mar 1886. Brigadier general of volunteers, 25 Apr 1862–20 Apr 1865; major general of volunteers, 20 Apr 1865–1 Sep 1866. Brevet major general, 13 Mar 1865; brevet major general of volunteers, 26 Aug 1864. Awarded Thanks of Congress, 1865.
*	Gabriel R. Paul	16 Feb 1865	(none)	0	(1813–1886) Brigadier general of volunteers, 5 Sep 1862–4 Mar 1863 and 18 Apr 1863–1 Sep 1866. Brevet brigadier general, 23 Feb 1865.
80	John A. Rawlins	3 Mar 1865	12 Mar 1869	4	(1831–1869) Chief of Staff to the Lieutenant General, 3 Mar 1865–25 Jul 1866; to the General, 26 Jul 1866–12 Mar 1869. Brigadier general of volunteers, 11 Aug 1863–3 Mar 1865. Brevet major general, 9 Apr 1865; brevet major general of volunteers, 24 Feb 1865.
81	Edward O. C. Ord	26 Jul 1866	6 Dec 1880	14	(1818–1883) Promoted to major general on the retired list, 28 Jan 1881. Brigadier general of volunteers, 14 Sep 1861–2 May 1862; major general of volunteers, 2 May 1862–1 Sep 1866. Brevet brigadier general, 13 Mar 1865; brevet major general, 13 Mar 1865.
82	Edward R. S. Canby	28 Jul 1866	11 Apr 1873	7	(1817–1873) Brigadier general of volunteers, 31 Mar 1862–7 May 1864; major general of volunteers, 7 May 1864–1 Sep 1866. Brevet brigadier general and brevet major general, 13 Mar 1865. Killed on duty.
83	Benjamin W. Brice	28 Jul 1866	1 Jun 1872	6	(1809–1892) Paymaster General. Brevet major general, 13 Mar 1865.
84	Andrew A. Humphreys	8 Aug 1866	30 Jun 1879	13	(1810–1883) Chief of Engineers. Brigadier general of volunteers, 28 Apr 1862–8 Jul 1863; major general of volunteers, 8 Jul 1863–1 Sep 1866. Brevet brigadier general and brevet major general, 13 Mar 1865.
*	Francis Fessenden	1 Nov 1866	(none)	0	(1839–1906) Brigadier general of volunteers, 10 May 1864–9 Nov 1865; major general of volunteers, 9 Nov 1865–1 Sep 1866. Brevet brigadier general and brevet major general, 13 Mar 1865.
85	Lovell H. Rousseau	28 Mar 1867	7 Jan 1869	2	(1818–1869) Brigadier general of volunteers, 1 Oct 1861–8 Oct 1862; major general of volunteers, 8 Oct 1862–30 Nov 1865. Brevet major general, 28 Mar 1867. Died in office.
*	Eli Long	16 Aug 1867	(none)	0	(1837–1903) Brigadier general of volunteers, 18 Aug 1864–15 Jan 1866. Brevet brigadier general, brevet major general, and brevet major general of volunteers, 13 Mar 1865.
*	Richard W. Johnson	12 Oct 1867	(none)	0	(1827–1897) Brigadier general of volunteers, 11 Oct 1861–15 Jan 1866. Brevet brigadier general, brevet major general, and brevet major general of volunteers, 13 Mar 1865.
*	Thomas J. Wood	9 Jun 1868	(none)	0	(1823–1906) Brigadier general of volunteers, 11 Oct 1861–1 Sep 1866. Brevet brigadier general and brevet major general, 13 Mar 1865.
86	Edward D. Townsend	22 Feb 1869	15 Jun 1880	11	(1817–1893) Adjutant General. Brevet brigadier general, 24 Sep 1864; brevet major general, 13 Mar 1865.
87	Christopher C. Augur	4 Mar 1869	10 Jul 1885	16	(1821–1898) Brigadier general of volunteers, 12 Nov 1861–9 Aug 1862; major general of volunteers, 9 Aug 1862–1 Sep 1866. Brevet brigadier general and brevet major general, 13 Mar 1865.
*	Thomas W. Sweeny	11 May 1870	(none)	0	(1820–1892) Brigadier general of Missouri volunteers, 20 May 1861–14 Aug 1861; brigadier general of volunteers, 29 Nov 1862–24 Aug 1865. Brevet brigadier general of volunteers, 13 Apr 1865.
*	John B. McIntosh	30 Jul 1870	(none)	0	(1829–1888) Brigadier general of volunteers, 21 Jul 1864–30 Apr 1866. Brevet brigadier general, brevet major general, and brevet major general of volunteers, 13 Mar 1865.
*	Martin D. Hardin	15 Dec 1870	(none)	0	(1837–1823) Brigadier general of volunteers, 2 Jul 1864–15 Jan 1866. Brevet brigadier general, 13 Mar 1865.
*	William F. Lynch	15 Dec 1870	(none)	0	(1839–1876) Brevet brigadier general of volunteers, 31 Jan 1865.
*	Joseph B. Kiddoo	15 Dec 1870	(none)	0	(1840–1880) Brevet brigadier general, 2 Mar 1867; brevet brigadier general of volunteers, 15 Jun 1865; brevet major general of volunteers, 4 Sep 1865.
*	Samuel Ross	1 Jan 1871	(none)	0	(1822–1880) Reduced to colonel on the retired list, 3 Mar 1875. Brevet brigadier general of volunteers, 13 Apr 1865.
*	Samuel W. Crawford	19 Feb 1873	(none)	0	(1829–1892) Brigadier general of volunteers, 25 Apr 1862–15 Jun 1866. Brevet brigadier general and brevet major general, 13 Mar 1865.
88	George Crook	29 Oct 1873	6 Apr 1888	14	(1828–1890) Promoted to major general, 6 Apr 1888. Brigadier general of volunteers, 7 Sep 1862–21 Oct 1864; major general of volunteers, 21 Oct 1864–15 Jan 1866. Brevet brigadier general and brevet major general, 13 Mar 1865; brevet major general of volunteers, 18 Jul 1864.
89	Alexander E. Shiras	23 Jun 1874	14 Apr 1875	1	(1812–1875) Commissary General of Subsistence. Brevet brigadier general, 17 Sep 1864; brevet major general, 13 Mar 1865. Died in office.
90	Stephen V. Benét	23 Jun 1874	22 Jan 1891	17	(1827–1895) Chief of Ordnance.
91	Robert Macfeely	14 Apr 1875	1 Jul 1890	15	(1826–1900) Commissary General of Subsistence. Brevet Second Lieutenant, 4th Infantry, 1 July 1850; Second Lieutenant 13 July 1852; First Lieutenant 3 Feb 1855; Captain Commissary of Subsistence, 11 May 1861; Vol. Lieutenant Colonel Commissary of Subsistence 1 Jan 1863 - 3 Sept 1864; Major Commissary of Subsistence, 9 Feb 1863; Brevet Lieutenant Colonel and Colonel, 13 Mars 1865.
92	William M. Dunn	1 Dec 1875	22 Jan 1881	5	(1814–1887) Judge Advocate General. Brevet brigadier general, 13 March 1865.
*	William H. Emory	1 Jul 1876	(none)	0	(1811–1887) Brigadier general of volunteers, 17 Mar 1862–25 Sep 1865; major general of volunteers, 25 Sep 1865–15 Jan 1866. Brevet brigadier general and brevet major general, 13 Mar 1865.
93	Benjamin Alvord	22 Jul 1876	8 Jun 1880	4	(1813–1884) Paymaster General. Brigadier general of volunteers, 15 Apr 1862–8 Aug 1865. Brevet brigadier general, 9 Apr 1865.
94	Randolph B. Marcy	12 Dec 1878	2 Jan 1881	2	(1812–1887) Inspector General. Brigadier general of volunteers, 23 Sep 1861–17 Jul 1862 and 13 Sep 1862–4 Mar 1863. Brevet brigadier general and brevet major general of volunteers, 13 Mar 1865.
95	Horatio G. Wright	30 Jun 1879	6 Mar 1884	5	(1820–1899) Chief of Engineers. Brigadier general of volunteers, 14 Sep 1861–19 Jul 1862 and 24 Mar 1863–12 May 1864; major general of volunteers, 18 Jul 1862–24 Mar 1863 and 12 May 1864–1 Sep 1866. Brevet brigadier general and brevet major general, 13 Mar 1865.
96	Nathan W. Brown	8 Jun 1880	6 Feb 1882	2	(1818–1893) Paymaster General. Brevet brigadier general, 15 Oct 1867.
97	Richard C. Drum	15 Jun 1880	28 May 1889	9	(1825–1909) Adjutant General. Brevet brigadier general, 13 Mar 1865.
98	Albert J. Myer	16 Jun 1880	24 Aug 1880	0	(1828–1880) Chief Signal Officer. Brevet brigadier general, 13 Mar 1865. Died in office.
99	William B. Hazen	15 Dec 1880	16 Jan 1887	6	(1830–1887) Chief Signal Officer. Brigadier general of volunteers, 29 Nov 1862–13 Dec 1864; major general of volunteers, 13 Dec 1864–15 Jan 1866. Brevet brigadier general and brevet major general, 13 Mar 1865. Died in office.
100	Nelson A. Miles	15 Dec 1880	5 Apr 1890	9	(1839–1925) Promoted to major general, 5 Apr 1890; to lieutenant general, 2 Feb 1901. Senior major general of the line commanding the Army with rank of lieutenant general, 6 Jun 1900–2 Feb 1901. Brigadier general of volunteers, 12 May 1864–21 Oct 1865; major general of volunteers, 21 Oct 1865–1 Sep 1866. Brevet brigadier general and brevet major general, 2 Mar 1867; brevet major general of volunteers, 25 Aug 1864. Awarded Medal of Honor, 1863.
101	Delos B. Sackett	2 Jan 1881	8 Mar 1885	4	(1822–1885) Inspector General. Brevet brigadier general and brevet major general, 13 Mar 1865. Died in office.
102	David G. Swaim	18 Feb 1881	22 Dec 1894	14	(1834–1897) Judge Advocate General.
103	Daniel H. Rucker	13 Feb 1882	23 Feb 1882	0	(1812–1910) Quartermaster General. Brigadier general of volunteers, 23 May 1863–1 Sep 1866. Brevet brigadier general, 5 Jul 1864; brevet major general and brevet major general of volunteers, 13 Mar 1865.
104	William B. Rochester	17 Feb 1882	15 Feb 1890	8	(1826–1909) Paymaster General.
105	Rufus Ingalls	23 Feb 1882	1 Jul 1883	1	(1818–1893) Quartermaster General. Brigadier general of volunteers, 23 May 1863–1 Sep 1866. Brevet brigadier general, brevet major general, and brevet major general of volunteers, 13 Mar 1865.
106	Charles H. Crane	3 Jul 1882	10 Oct 1883	1	(1825–1883) Surgeon General. Brevet brigadier general, 13 Mar 1865. Died in office.
107	Ranald S. Mackenzie	26 Oct 1882	24 Mar 1884	1	(1840–1889) Brigadier general of volunteers, 19 Oct 1864–15 Jan 1866. Brevet brigadier general, 13 Mar 1865; brevet major general of volunteers, 31 Mar 1865.
108	Samuel B. Holabird	1 Jul 1883	16 Jun 1890	7	(1826–1907) Quartermaster General. Brevet brigadier general, 13 Mar 1865.
109	Robert Murray	23 Nov 1883	6 Aug 1886	3	(1822–1913) Surgeon General.
110	John Newton	6 Mar 1884	27 Aug 1886	2	(1822–1895) Chief of Engineers. Brigadier general of volunteers, 23 Sep 1861–30 Mar 1863 and 18 Apr 1864–31 Jan 1866; major general of volunteers, 30 Mar 1863–18 Apr 1864. Brevet brigadier general, brevet major general, and brevet major general of volunteers, 13 Mar 1865.
111	David S. Stanley	24 Mar 1884	1 Jun 1892	8	(1828–1902) Brigadier general of volunteers, 28 Sep 1861–29 Nov 1862; major general of volunteers, 29 Nov 1862–1 Feb 1866. Brevet brigadier general, 13 Mar 1865; brevet major general, 13 Mar 1865. Awarded Medal of Honor, 1864.
112	Nelson H. Davis	11 Mar 1885	20 Sep 1885	1	(1821–1890) Inspector General. Brevet brigadier general, 13 Mar 1865.
113	John Gibbon	10 Jul 1885	20 Apr 1891	6	(1827–1896) Brigadier general of volunteers, 2 May 1862–7 Jun 1864; major general of volunteers, 7 Jun 1864–15 Jan 1866. Brevet brigadier general and brevet major general, 13 Mar 1865.
114	Absalom Baird	22 Sep 1885	20 Aug 1888	3	(1824–1905) Inspector General. Brigadier general of volunteers, 28 Apr 1862–1 Sep 1866. Brevet brigadier general and brevet major general, 13 Mar 1865; brevet major general of volunteers, 1 Sep 1864. Awarded Medal of Honor, 1864.
115	Thomas H. Ruger	19 Mar 1886	8 Feb 1895	9	(1833–1907) Promoted to major general, 8 Feb 1895. Brigadier general of volunteers, 29 Nov 1862–1 Sep 1866. Brevet brigadier general, 2 Mar 1867; brevet major general of volunteers, 30 Nov 1864.
116	Joseph H. Potter	1 Apr 1886	12 Oct 1886	1	(1822–1892) Brigadier general of volunteers, 1 May 1865–15 Jan 1866. Brevet brigadier general, 13 Mar 1865.
117	James C. Duane	11 Oct 1886	30 Jun 1888	2	(1824–1897) Chief of Engineers. Brevet brigadier general, 13 Mar 1865.
118	Orlando B. Willcox	13 Oct 1886	16 Apr 1887	1	(1823–1907) Brigadier general of volunteers, 21 Jul 1861–15 Jan 1866. Brevet brigadier general and brevet major general, 2 Mar 1867; brevet major general of volunteers, 1 Aug 1864. Awarded Medal of Honor, 1861.
119	John Moore	18 Nov 1886	16 Aug 1890	4	(1826–1907) Surgeon General.
120	Adolphus W. Greely	3 Mar 1887	10 Feb 1906	19	(1844–1935) Chief Signal Officer. Promoted to major general, 10 Feb 1906. Awarded Medal of Honor, 1935.
121	Wesley Merritt	16 Apr 1887	25 Apr 1895	8	(1836–1910) Promoted to major general, 25 Apr 1895. Brigadier general of volunteers, 29 Jun 1863–1 Apr 1865; major general of volunteers, 1 Apr 1865–1 Feb 1866. Brevet brigadier general and brevet major general, 13 Mar 1865; brevet major general of volunteers, 19 Oct 1864.
122	John R. Brooke	6 Apr 1888	22 May 1897	9	(1838–1926) Promoted to major general, 22 May 1897. Brigadier general of volunteers, 12 May 1864–1 Feb 1866. Brevet brigadier general, 2 Mar 1867; brevet major general of volunteers, 1 Aug 1864.
123	Thomas L. Casey	6 Jul 1888	10 May 1895	7	(1831–1896) Chief of Engineers.
124	Roger Jones	20 Aug 1888	26 Jan 1889	0	(1831–1889) Inspector General. Died in office.
125	Joseph C. Breckinridge	30 Jan 1889	11 Apr 1903	14	(1842–1920) Inspector General. Promoted to major general, 11 Apr 1903. Major general of volunteers, 4 May 1898–30 Nov 1898.
126	John C. Kelton	7 Jun 1889	24 Jun 1892	3	(1828–1893) Adjutant General.
127	William Smith	10 Mar 1890	26 Mar 1895	5	(1831–1912) Paymaster General.
128	Benjamin H. Grierson	5 Apr 1890	8 Jul 1890	0	(1826–1911) Brigadier general of volunteers, 3 Jun 1863–27 May 1865; major general of volunteers, 27 May 1865–30 Apr 1866. Brevet brigadier general and brevet major general, 2 Mar 1867; brevet major general of volunteers, 10 Feb 1865.
129	Richard N. Batchelder	26 Jun 1890	27 Jul 1896	6	(1832–1901) Quartermaster General. Brevet brigadier general of volunteers, 13 Mar 1865. Awarded Medal of Honor, 1863.
130	Beekman Du Barry	10 Jul 1890	4 Dec 1892	2	(1828–1901) Commissary General of Subsistence.
131	Alexander M. McCook	11 Jul 1890	9 Nov 1894	4	(1831–1903) Promoted to major general, 9 Nov 1894. Brigadier general of volunteers, 3 Sep 1861–17 Jul 1862; major general of volunteers, 17 Jul 1862–21 Oct 1865. Brevet brigadier general and brevet major general, 13 Mar 1865.
132	Jedediah H. Baxter	16 Aug 1890	4 Dec 1890	0	(1837–1890) Surgeon General. Died in office.
133	Charles Sutherland	23 Dec 1890	29 Mar 1893	2	(1829–1895) Surgeon General.
134	Daniel W. Flagler	23 Jan 1891	29 Mar 1899	8	(1835–1899) Chief of Ordnance. Died in office.
135	August V. Kautz	20 Apr 1891	5 Jan 1892	1	(1828–1895) Brigadier general of volunteers, 7 May 1864–15 Jan 1866. Brevet brigadier general and brevet major general, 13 Mar 1865; brevet major general of volunteers, 28 Oct 1864.
136	Frank Wheaton	18 Apr 1892	2 Apr 1897	5	(1833–1903) Promoted to major general, 2 Apr 1897. Brigadier general of volunteers, 29 Nov 1862–30 Apr 1866. Brevet brigadier general and brevet major general, 13 Mar 1865; brevet major general of volunteers, 19 Oct 1864.
137	Robert Williams	5 Jul 1892	5 Nov 1893	1	(1829–1901) Adjutant General. Brevet brigadier general, 13 Mar 1865.
138	Eugene A. Carr	19 Jul 1892	15 Feb 1893	1	(1830–1910) Brigadier general of volunteers, 7 Mar 1862–15 Jan 1866. Brevet brigadier general and brevet major general, 13 Mar 1865; brevet major general of volunteers, 11 Mar 1865. Awarded Medal of Honor, 1862.
139	John P. Hawkins	22 Dec 1892	29 Sep 1894	2	(1830–1914) Commissary General of Subsistence. Brigadier general of volunteers, 13 Apr 1863–1 Feb 1866. Brevet brigadier general and brevet major general, 13 Mar 1865; brevet major general of volunteers, 30 Jun 1865.
140	William P. Carlin	17 May 1893	24 Nov 1893	1	(1829–1903) Brigadier general of volunteers, 29 Nov 1862–24 Aug 1865. Brevet brigadier general and brevet major general, 13 Mar 1865; brevet major general of volunteers, 19 Mar 1865.
141	George M. Sternberg	30 May 1893	8 Jun 1902	9	(1838–1915) Surgeon General.
142	George D. Ruggles	6 Nov 1893	11 Sep 1897	4	(1833–1904) Adjutant General. Brevet brigadier general, 13 Mar 1865.
143	Elwell S. Otis	28 Nov 1893	16 Jun 1900	7	(1838–1909) Promoted to major general, 16 Jun 1900. Major general of volunteers, 4 May 1898–16 Jun 1900. Brevet brigadier general of volunteers, 13 Mar 1865; brevet major general, 4 Feb 1899.
144	Michael R. Morgan	8 Oct 1894	18 Jan 1897	2	(1833–1911) Commissary General of Subsistence. Brevet brigadier general, 9 Apr 1865.
145	James W. Forsyth	9 Nov 1894	11 May 1897	3	(1835–1906) Promoted to major general, 11 May 1897. Brigadier general of volunteers, 19 May 1865–15 Jan 1866. Brevet brigadier general of volunteers, 19 Oct 1864; brevet brigadier general, 9 Apr 1865.
146	Guido N. Lieber	3 Jan 1895	21 May 1901	6	(1837–1923) Judge Advocate General.
147	Thaddeus H. Stanton	26 Mar 1895	30 Jan 1899	4	(1835–1900) Paymaster General.
148	Zenas R. Bliss	25 Apr 1895	14 May 1897	2	(1835–1900) Promoted to major general, 14 May 1897. Awarded Medal of Honor, 1862.
149	John J. Coppinger	25 Apr 1895	11 Oct 1898	3	(1834–1909) Major general of volunteers, 4 May 1898–31 Oct 1898.
150	William P. Craighill	10 May 1895	1 Feb 1897	2	(1833–1909) Chief of Engineers.
151	Charles G. Sawtelle	19 Aug 1896	16 Feb 1897	0	(1834–1913) Quartermaster General. Brevet brigadier general, 13 Mar 1865.
152	Thomas C. Sullivan	18 Jan 1897	14 Nov 1897	1	(1833–1908) Commissary General of Subsistence.
153	John M. Wilson	1 Feb 1897	30 Apr 1901	4	(1837–1919) Chief of Engineers. Awarded Medal of Honor, 1862.
154	George H. Weeks	16 Feb 1897	2 Feb 1898	1	(1834–1905) Quartermaster General.
155	William R. Shafter	3 May 1897	16 Oct 1899	2	(1835–1906) Promoted to major general on the retired list, 1 Jul 1901. Major general of volunteers, 4 May 1898–30 Jun 1901. Brevet brigadier general of volunteers, 13 Mar 1865. Awarded Medal of Honor, 1862.
156	William M. Graham	26 May 1897	28 Sep 1898	1	(1834–1916) Promoted to major general on the retired list, 4 Mar 1915. Major general of volunteers, 4 May 1898–30 Nov 1898. Brevet brigadier general, 13 Mar 1865.
157	John K. Mizner	26 May 1897	7 Jun 1897	0	(1834–1898) Brevet brigadier general of volunteers, 13 Mar 1865.
158	James F. Wade	26 May 1897	13 Apr 1903	6	(1843–1921) Promoted to major general, 13 Apr 1903. Major general of volunteers, 4 May 1898–12 Jun 1899. Brevet brigadier general of volunteers, 13 Feb 1865.
159	Anson Mills	16 Jun 1897	22 Jun 1897	0	(1834–1924)
160	Caleb H. Carlton	28 Jun 1897	30 Jun 1897	0	(1836–1923)
161	Henry C. Merriam	30 Jun 1897	13 Nov 1901	4	(1837–1912) Promoted to major general on the retired list, 19 Feb 1903. Major general of volunteers, 4 May 1898–24 Feb 1899. Awarded Medal of Honor, 1865.
162	Samuel Breck	11 Sep 1897	25 Feb 1898	0	(1834–1918) Adjutant General. Brevet brigadier general, 13 Mar 1865.
163	William H. Bell	14 Nov 1897	28 Jan 1898	0	(1834–1906) Commissary General of Subsistence.
164	Samuel T. Cushing	28 Jan 1898	21 Apr 1898	0	(1839–1901) Commissary General of Subsistence.
165	Marshall I. Ludington	3 Feb 1898	12 Apr 1903	5	(1839–1919) Quartermaster General. Promoted to major general, 12 Apr 1903. Brevet brigadier general of volunteers, 13 Mar 1865.
166	Henry C. Corbin	25 Feb 1898	6 Jun 1900	2	(1842–1909) Adjutant General with rank of brigadier general, 25 Feb 1898–6 Jun 1900; with rank of major general, 6 Jun 1900–15 Apr 1906. Promoted to lieutenant general, 15 Apr 1906. Brevet brigadier general of volunteers, 13 Mar 1865.
167	William H. Nash	21 Apr 1898	2 May 1898	0	(1834–1902) Commissary General of Subsistence.
168	Charles P. Eagan	3 May 1898	6 Dec 1900	3	(1841–1919) Commissary General of Subsistence.
169	Hamilton S. Hawkins	28 Sep 1898	4 Oct 1898	0	(1834–1910) Brigadier general of volunteers, 4 May 1898–8 Jul 1898; major general of volunteers, 8 Jul 1898–30 Nov 1898.
170	Jacob F. Kent	4 Oct 1898	15 Oct 1898	0	(1835–1918) Promoted to major general on the retired list, 4 Mar 1915. Brigadier general of volunteers, 4 May 1898–8 Jul 1898; major general of volunteers, 8 Jul 1898–30 Nov 1898.
171	Guy V. Henry	11 Oct 1898	27 Oct 1899	0	(1839–1899) Brigadier general of volunteers, 4 May 1898–7 Dec 1898; major general of volunteers, 7 Dec 1898–12 Jun 1899. Brevet brigadier general of volunteers, 28 Oct 1864; brevet brigadier general, 27 Feb 1890. Awarded Medal of Honor, 1864. Died in office.
172	William S. Worth	29 Oct 1898	9 Nov 1898	0	(1840–1904) Brigadier general of volunteers, 12 Jul 1898–30 Oct 1898.
173	William M. Wherry	7 Jan 1899	18 Jan 1899	0	(1836–1918) Brigadier general of volunteers, 21 Sep 1898–30 Nov 1898. Brevet brigadier general of volunteers, 13 Mar 1865. Awarded Medal of Honor, 1861.
174	John H. Patterson	18 Jan 1899	6 Feb 1899	0	(1843–1920) Brigadier general of volunteers, 21 Sep 1898–30 Nov 1898. Awarded Medal of Honor, 1864.
175	Asa B. Carey	30 Jan 1899	12 Jul 1899	0	(1835–1912) Paymaster General.
176	William Sinclair	8 Feb 1899	13 Feb 1899	0	(1835–1905)
177	Marcus P. Miller	15 Feb 1899	27 Mar 1899	0	(1835–1906) Brigadier general of volunteers, 27 May 1898–28 Feb 1899.
178	Frederick C. Ainsworth	2 Mar 1899	23 Apr 1904	5	(1852–1934) Chief of Records and Pension Office, 2 Mar 1899–23 Apr 1904; Military Secretary with rank of major general, 23 Apr 1904–5 Mar 1907; The Adjutant General with rank of major general, 5 Mar 1907–16 Feb 1912.
179	Edwin V. Sumner Jr.	27 Mar 1899	30 Mar 1899	0	(1835–1912) Brigadier general of volunteers, 27 May 1898–24 Feb 1899. Brevet brigadier general of volunteers, 28 Mar 1865.
180	Thomas M. Anderson	31 Mar 1899	21 Jan 1900	1	(1836–1917) Brigadier general of volunteers, 4 May 1898–13 Aug 1898; major general of volunteers, 13 Aug 1898–12 Jun 1899.
181	Adelbert R. Buffington	5 Apr 1899	22 Nov 1901	3	(1837–1922) Chief of Ordnance.
182	Alfred E. Bates	12 Jul 1899	21 Jan 1904	5	(1840–1909) Paymaster General. Promoted to major general, 21 Jan 1904. Brigadier general of volunteers, 4 May 1898–31 Oct 1898.
183	Alexander C. M. Pennington	16 Oct 1899	17 Oct 1899	0	(1838–1917) Promoted to major general on the retired list, 29 Aug 1916. Brigadier general of volunteers, 4 May 1898–12 Apr 1899. Brevet brigadier general of volunteers, 15 Jul 1865.
184	Royal T. Frank	17 Oct 1899	18 Oct 1899	0	(1836–1908) Brigadier general of volunteers, 4 May 1898 – 12 May 1899.
185	Louis H. Carpenter	18 Oct 1899	19 Oct 1899	0	(1839–1916) Brigadier general of volunteers, 4 May 1898–12 Jun 1899. Awarded Medal of Honor, 1868.
186	Samuel Ovenshine	19 Oct 1899	20 Oct 1899	0	(1843–1932) Brigadier general of volunteers, 13 Aug 1898–17 Apr 1899 and 17 Apr 1899–20 Oct 1899.
187	Daniel W. Burke	20 Oct 1899	21 Oct 1899	0	(1841–1911) Awarded Medal of Honor, 1862.
188	Gilbert S. Carpenter	5 Dec 1899	26 Dec 1899	0	(1836–1904) Brigadier general of volunteers, 21 Sep 1898–12 May 1899.
189	Edgar R. Kellogg	5 Dec 1899	16 Dec 1899	0	(1842–1914) Brigadier general of volunteers, 1 Oct 1898–24 Feb 1899.
190	Samuel B. M. Young	2 Jan 1900	2 Feb 1901	1	(1840–1924) Promoted to major general, 2 Feb 1901; to lieutenant general, 8 Aug 1903. Brigadier general of volunteers, 4 May 1898–8 Jul 1898 and 13 Apr 1899–10 Jan 1900; major general of volunteers, 8 Jul 1898–13 Apr 1899. Brevet brigadier general of volunteers, 9 Apr 1865.
191	Arthur MacArthur	2 Jan 1900	5 Feb 1901	1	(1845–1912) Promoted to major general, 5 Feb 1901; to lieutenant general, 15 Sep 1906. Brigadier general of volunteers, 27 May 1898–13 Aug 1898; major general of volunteers, 13 Aug 1898–18 Feb 1901. Awarded Medal of Honor, 1863.
192	William Ludlow	21 Jan 1900	30 Aug 1901	2	(1843–1901) Brigadier general of volunteers, 4 May 1898–7 Sep 1898 and 13 Apr 1899–21 Jan 1900; major general of volunteers, 7 Sep 1898–13 Apr 1899. Died in office.
193	Joseph Wheeler	16 Jun 1900	10 Sep 1900	0	(1836–1906) Confederate States Provisional Army brigadier general, 30 Oct 1862–20 Jan 1863, and major general, 20 Jan 1863–8 Jun 1865; major general of volunteers, 4 May 1898–12 Apr 1899; brigadier general of volunteers, 12 Apr 1899–16 Jun 1900.
194	John F. Weston	6 Dec 1900	8 Oct 1905	5	(1845–1917) Commissary General of Subsistence. Promoted to major general, 8 Oct 1905. Brigadier general of volunteers, 21 Sep 1898–24 Mar 1899. Awarded Medal of Honor, 1865.
195	Henry B. Freeman	16 Jan 1901	17 Jan 1901	0	(1837–1915) Awarded Medal of Honor, 1862.

== Timeline ==
=== Line ===
By February 1, 1901, there were six brigadier generals of the line (brig.gen. 1–6). An officer held the permanent grade of brigadier general (Brig.gen.) until his death; retirement; resignation; discharge; dismissal; or promotion to a higher permanent grade such as major general (Maj.gen.), lieutenant general (Lt.gen.), or general (Gen.). An officer's Regular Army grade was not affected by brevet appointments (bvt.) or appointments in other organizations such as the United States Volunteers (vols.) or the Confederate States Army (CSA).

=== Staff ===
By February 1, 1901, there were ten brigadier generals of the staff: the Quartermaster General (Q.m.Gen.), the Inspector General (Insp. Gen.), the Chief of Ordnance (C.of Ord.), the Surgeon General (Surg.Gen.), the Commissary General of Subsistence (C.G.of S.), the Chief of Engineers (C.of Eng.), the Judge Advocate General (J.A.G.), the Paymaster General (P.m.Gen.), the Chief Signal Officer (C.S.O.), and the Chief of the Records and Pension Office (C.of R.P.O.). In addition, the office of Adjutant General (Adj. Gen.) was scheduled to revert to brigadier general rank after the term of its then-incumbent.

== History ==
=== Northwest Indian War ===
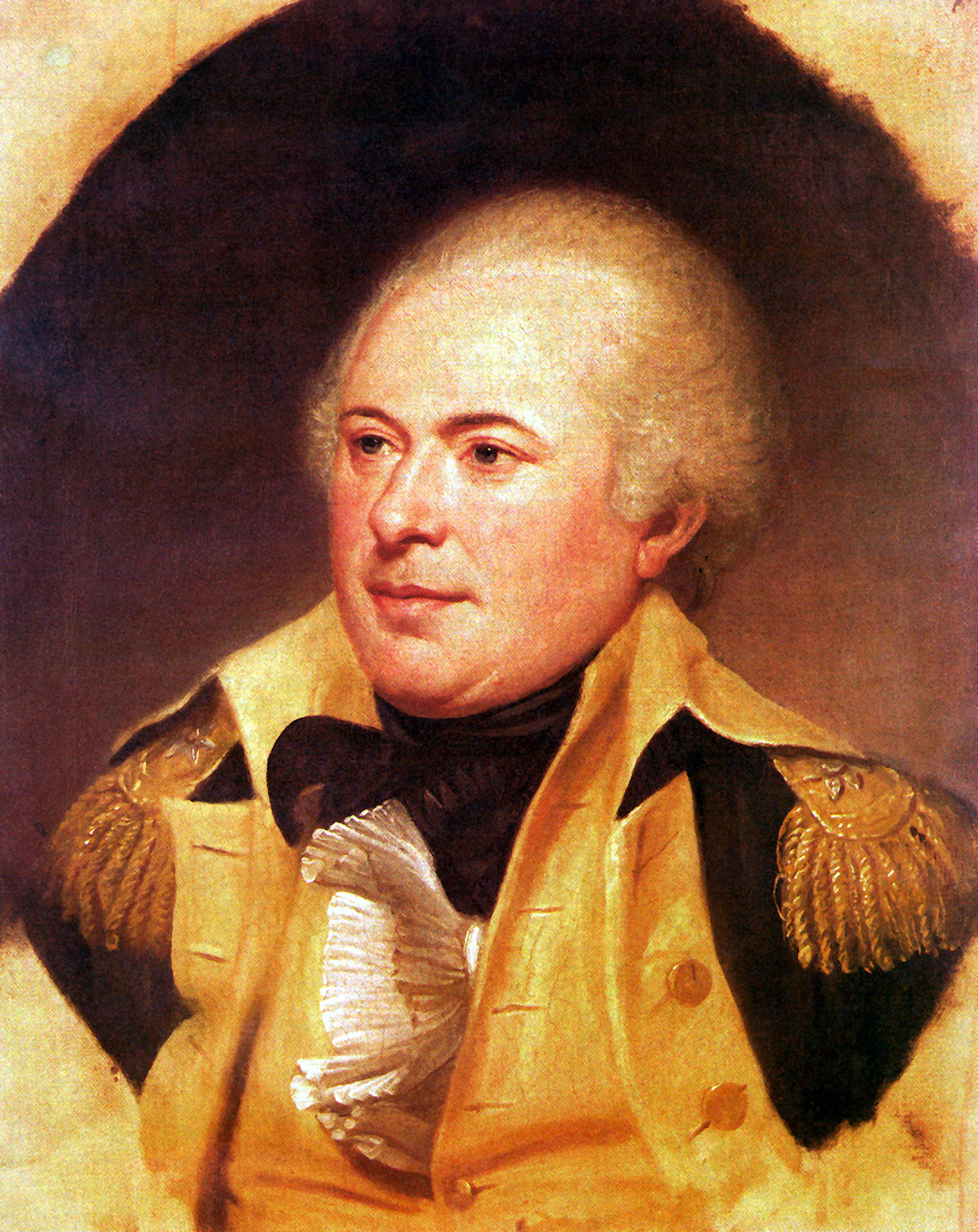
James Wilkinson

For the first two years of its existence, the United States Army was so small that its highest-ranking officer was a lieutenant colonel, Josiah Harmar, who, as the Army's senior officer, held the rank of brigadier general only by brevet. The substantive grades of major general and brigadier general were created in 1791 when the Army was expanded to fight the Northwest Indian War; a major general was immediately appointed to supersede Harmar, in whom confidence had been lost following his defeat the year before, but the brigadier general grade remained vacant until Harmar resigned in early 1792, whereupon the Army's only other lieutenant colonel, James Wilkinson, became its first substantive brigadier general.

In response to its early setbacks the Army was reorganized as the Legion of the United States, merging its separate infantry, cavalry, and artillery regiments into four combined-arms sub-legions. To entice former Continental Army generals to command the sub-legions, Congress authorized four additional brigadier generalcies, but so many candidates declined these appointments that the sub-legions had to be commanded by lieutenant colonels instead. The additional brigadier generalcies expired along with the grade of major general when the Army reconstituted its regiments after the war, leaving Wilkinson as the Army's senior officer and sole brigadier general.

=== Quasi-War ===
In July 1798 the Quasi-War with France induced Congress to augment the Regular Army by raising a Provisional Army for the duration of the conflict. In addition to the general officers commissioned in the Provisional Army, the Regular Army was authorized three more brigadier generals of the line and an Adjutant General with the ex officio rank of brigadier general. John Brooks, William Washington, and Jonathan Dayton were appointed brigadier generals of the line and William North was appointed Adjutant General, but only Washington and North accepted their commissions. Both were discharged when Congress disbanded the Provisional Army in June 1800, again leaving Wilkinson as the only brigadier general.

=== War of 1812 ===
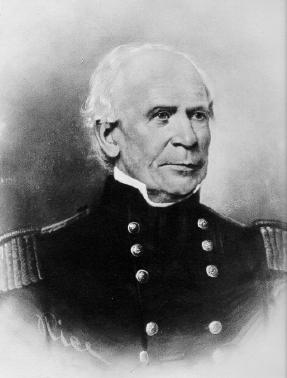
Thomas S. Jesup

Tensions arising from the Chesapeake–Leopard affair led Congress to triple the authorized strength of the Army in 1808, for a total of three brigadier generals: Wilkinson, Wade Hampton, and Peter Gansevoort. Four years later, with the War of 1812 looming, Congress authorized a massive expansion of the military establishment, led by two major generals; five more brigadier generals of the line; and an adjutant general, an inspector general, and a quartermaster general with ex officio ranks of brigadier general. Dubbed "cabinet generals," the initial cohort of general officers were selected based on mostly political criteria, and their disastrous performance early in the war led them to be phased out in favor of proven "fighting generals" like Andrew Jackson, Jacob J. Brown, and Winfield Scott.

After the war the Army reverted to a much smaller peacetime establishment. Of the fifteen brigadier generals in the Army at the beginning of 1815, only five were retained in grade: Alexander Macomb, Edmund P. Gaines, Winfield Scott, Eleazar W. Ripley, and Adjutant and Inspector General Daniel Parker. The remaining ten either resigned, were discharged as surplus in grade, or were retained in the Army at the grade of colonel. In 1821 another round of Army cuts reduced Macomb, Parker, and Henry T. Atkinson to colonel, leaving Gaines, Scott, and Quartermaster General Thomas S. Jesup as the Army's only brigadier generals. Gaines, Scott, and Jesup would monopolize the rank for a generation, spending a combined total of 104 years as brigadier generals. Jesup, appointed Quartermaster General at the age of 30, would serve a record 42 years as brigadier general, finally dying in office on the eve of the Civil War. Scott was promoted to major general in 1841 and was succeeded by Inspector General John E. Wool, the first promotion to brigadier general in over twenty years.

=== Mexican War ===
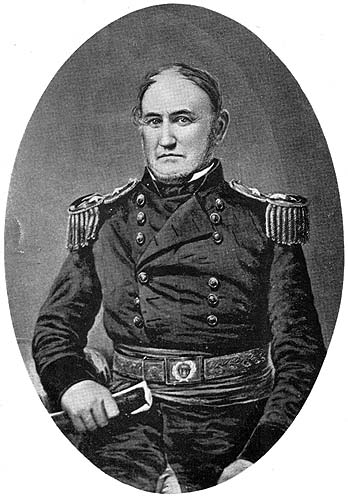
David E. Twiggs

The Mexican War triggered a temporary increase in the number of general officers. In 1846 Congress authorized two additional brigadier generals on the condition that they be discharged immediately upon the ratification of a peace treaty; career Regular Army officers David E. Twiggs and Stephen W. Kearny were promoted to the new grades. The next year, three more wartime grades were authorized; Franklin Pierce, George Cadwalader, and Enos D. Hopping were appointed directly from civilian life. Hopping died a few months after his appointment, and the two remaining civilian generals were duly discharged at the end of the war, but Congress allowed Twiggs and Kearny to remain in grade while normal attrition reduced the number of brigadier generals to the desired peacetime total. Gaines and Kearny died within a year, leaving Wool and Twiggs as the two brigadier generals of the line authorized by statute.

In 1855 Congress increased the Army by four regiments and added a third brigadier generalcy of the line, which it intended for Illinois Senator James Shields, a former brigadier general of volunteers during the Mexican War who had just been defeated for reelection to the Senate. However, Scott, the Army's only major general, was almost seventy years old and likely to be succeeded by a brigadier general of the line. Since Wool and Twiggs were around the same age as Scott, the person appointed to the third brigadier generalcy could reasonably expect to become the next commanding general of the Army. Rather than vault the civilian Shields to potential command of the professional Army in a single bound, the administration instead promoted Colonel Persifor F. Smith, a distinguished career officer. Ironically, Wool and Twiggs both outlived Smith, who died unexpectedly in 1858 and was succeeded by Colonel William S. Harney.

In the end, none of the Army's prewar generals would retain high command in the United States Army during the Civil War. Of the five general officers in the Regular Army at the outbreak of hostilities, Scott retired almost immediately, Wool and Harney were sidelined and retired midway through the war, Twiggs was dismissed for treason after surrendering the garrison in Texas, and Quartermaster General Joseph E. Johnston resigned to join the Confederate States Army.

=== Civil War ===
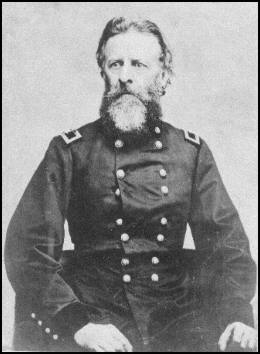
Philip S. G. Cooke

During the Civil War Congress augmented the permanent Regular Army with a massive temporary force of volunteers and conscripts. The overwhelming majority of Civil War brigadier generals were appointed to that grade only in the volunteer service, so hundreds of wartime generals lost their ranks when the volunteers were disbanded after the war.

Early wartime vacancies in the Regular Army grade of brigadier general were filled on the basis of prewar experience or anticipated brilliance, and included Colonels Edwin V. Sumner and Philip S. G. Cooke, Inspector General Joseph K. F. Mansfield, and Major Robert Anderson, all senior stalwarts of the peacetime Army; plus two relative newcomers, Brevet Assistant Adjutant General Irvin McDowell and former First Lieutenant William S. Rosecrans. By mid-1862 permanent Regular Army brigadier generalcies were being dangled as rewards for particularly successful volunteer generals, many of whom had been civilians or very junior Regular officers before the war; these later appointments went to Colonels William T. Sherman and George H. Thomas; Major Winfield S. Hancock; Captains John Pope, George G. Meade, James B. McPherson, Philip H. Sheridan, and John M. Schofield; former Captain Joseph Hooker; and First Lieutenant Oliver O. Howard — all major generals of volunteers — and civilian Alfred H. Terry, a brigadier general of volunteers.

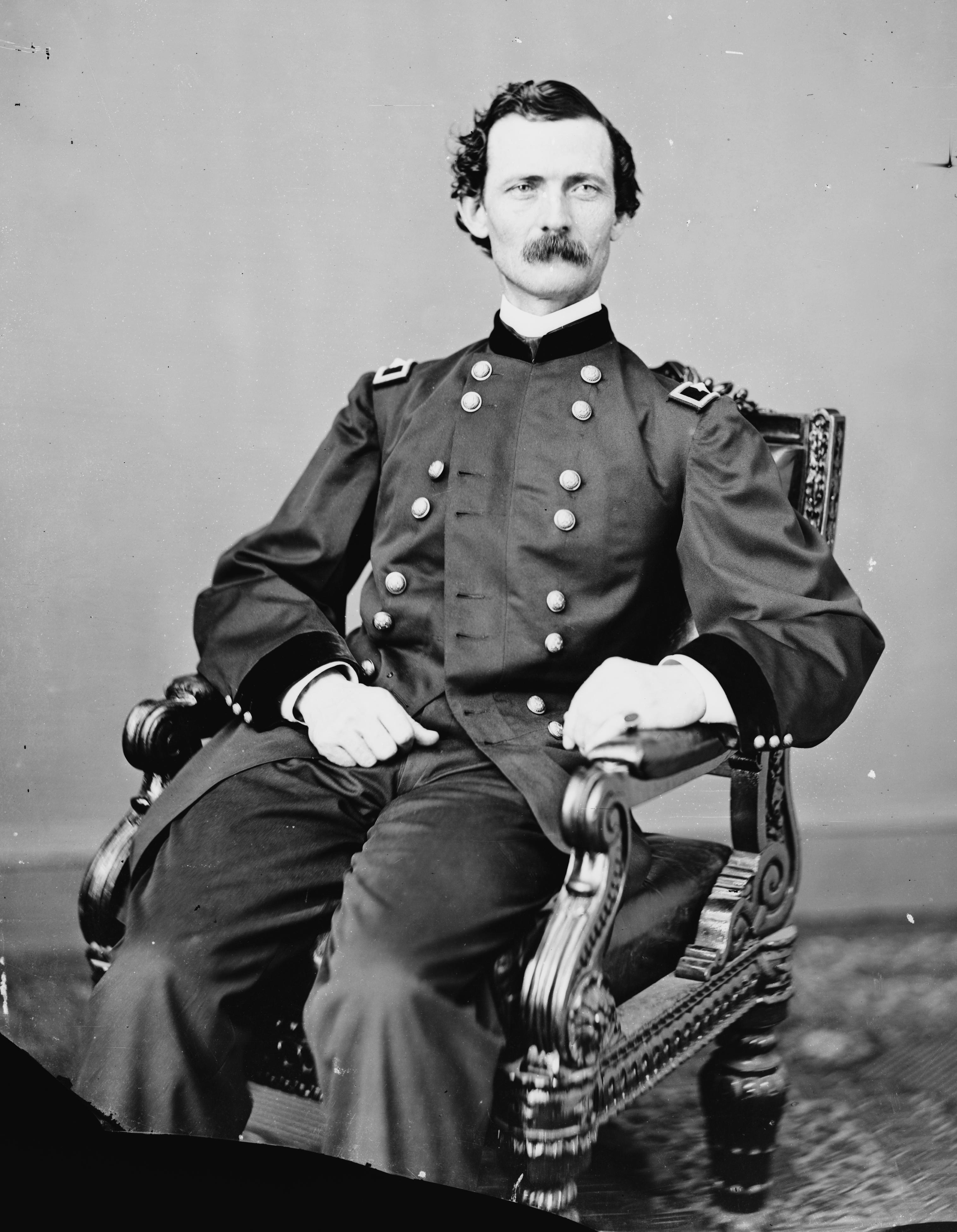
James B. Fry

Most of the Army's wartime bureau chiefs were eventually elevated to the ex officio rank of brigadier general, including the Adjutant General, the Chief of Ordnance, the Surgeon General, the Commissary General of Subsistence, the Chief of Engineers, and the Judge Advocate General. In 1864 James B. Fry was appointed Provost Marshal General with the rank of brigadier general to administer the non-Regular volunteers and draftees; unique among ex officio general officers of this era, Fry lost his rank when his office was abolished after the volunteers were disbanded in 1866. In 1865 Congress established the office of Chief of Staff to the Lieutenant General with ex officio rank of brigadier general as a mechanism to transfer Brigadier General of Volunteers John A. Rawlins to the Regular Army so that he could continue to serve as Lieutenant General Ulysses S. Grant's principal military assistant after the war; the office terminated when Rawlins became President Grant's first Secretary of War in 1869.

The postwar demobilization of the volunteers reduced most Civil War officers to much lower permanent grades in the Regular Army or to civilian life, so in 1866 Congress tripled the size of the Regular Army to create enough new force structure to reward officers with the grades their wartime service merited. To recognize the many outstanding volunteer officers who had not been professional soldiers before the war, half of the new commissions were reserved for civilian volunteers and the other half for prewar professionals. As a result, many civilian volunteers gained seniority over long-serving Regulars with similar or better records. For example, by 1886 Wesley Merritt stood only eleventh on the list of colonels of the line despite having outranked during the war all ten colonels now senior to him; Merritt was appointed only a lieutenant colonel in 1866, while civilians like Thomas H. Ruger and Orlando B. Willcox were appointed to colonelcies for which Merritt, a Regular officer, was ineligible, and twenty years later Ruger and Willcox were both promoted to brigadier general ahead of him.

=== Postwar ===
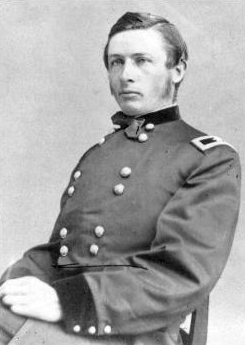
Ranald S. Mackenzie

Promotions in the Regular Army ground almost to a halt in the years following the Civil War, largely due to the glut of Civil War heroes who were rewarded with senior grades at a relatively young age and then camped in those grades for decades; dramatic reductions in the size of the peacetime military establishment squeezed the promotion bottleneck even tighter. Congress cut the number of brigadier generals of the line to eight in 1869 and to six a year later; death, retirement, and murder eventually cleared the path for Lieutenant Colonel George Crook to become a brigadier general of the line in 1873, the only such promotion between 1869 and 1880. Promotions did not resume their normal flow until Congress instituted a mandatory retirement age of sixty-four in 1882.

Famous field grade officers campaigned openly for every vacancy in the grade of brigadier general. The Civil War "boy generals" — Colonels Nelson A. Miles and Ranald S. Mackenzie and Lieutenant Colonel George A. Custer — were infamous for harsh maneuvers to regain their wartime ranks. Custer was killed in 1876 making his eponymous last stand at the Little Bighorn. Mackenzie was promoted to brigadier general in 1882, but pronounced hopelessly insane two years later and involuntarily retired. Miles — promoted to brigadier general in 1880 when President Rutherford B. Hayes agreed to accelerate Army promotions by involuntarily retiring Brigadier General Edward O. C. Ord — ascended to command of the entire Army and retired as a lieutenant general.

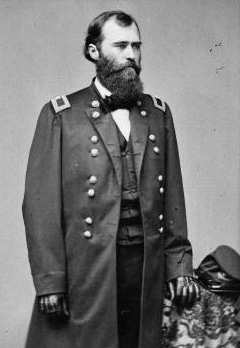
Eugene A. Carr

Political patronage weighed heavily in general officer appointments during this period. In January 1892 Secretary of War Stephen B. Elkins wanted to promote Colonel Eugene A. Carr to a vacant brigadier generalcy, but Elkins' influential predecessor, Vermont Senator Redfield Proctor, lobbied vigorously for Colonel Elwell S. Otis, while Commanding General of the Army John A. Schofield backed Colonel William P. Carlin, Senate Military Affairs Committee Chairman Joseph R. Hawley backed Colonel James W. Forsyth, and President pro tempore of the Senate Charles F. Manderson backed Colonel Frank Wheaton, who ultimately received the appointment in April. When the next vacancy opened in June, Elkins, Proctor, and Schofield agreed that Carr would be promoted but request to retire early so that Carlin could also be promoted and retired in time for Otis to be promoted before the end of President Benjamin Harrison's administration; since Carr had only two years until statutory retirement but Otis had more than a decade, this sequence would prevent the grade from falling vacant during the next four-year presidential term, thereby denying Harrison's successor an opportunity to reward a supporter. However, once promoted, Carr angrily repudiated this arrangement, claiming no one had told him he would have to retire early, so Harrison retired him involuntarily and nominated Otis for immediate promotion, skipping Carlin entirely. Carlin was promoted anyway when Otis agreed to defer his promotion at the behest of the next President, Grover Cleveland, who remembered Carlin fondly from a brief period of shared service early in the Civil War.

=== Spanish–American War ===
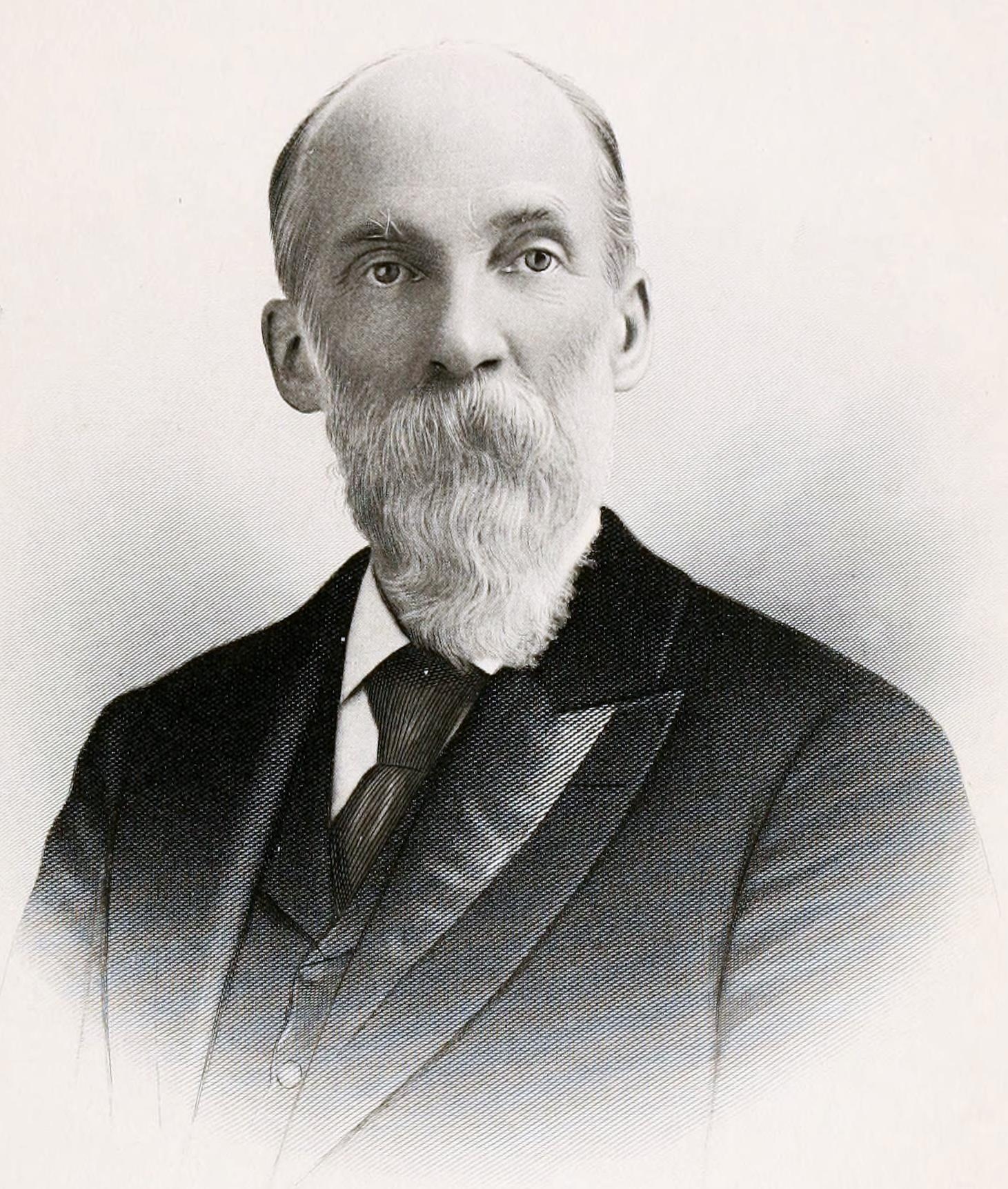
Joseph Wheeler

Congress raised a new force of volunteers to fight the Spanish–American War in 1898, and mustered a second volunteer force a year later for the Philippine–American War. In contrast to previous wars, no additional general officers were authorized in the Regular Army, confining the expansion of the general officer corps entirely to the non-permanent volunteer service. Echoing Civil War practice, volunteer generals were drawn from both Regular officers and civilians, with particularly prominent volunteer generals being rewarded with permanent brigadier generalcies in the Regular Army, including former Confederate major general Joseph Wheeler.

Many of the Army's wartime supply problems were blamed on the unusually rapid turnover of bureau chiefs before and during the war — four Quartermasters General and six Commissaries General of Subsistence in the 30 months before the war — due to a peacetime personnel policy that promoted general officers based on past service rather than future merit. In February 1882 President Chester A. Arthur involuntarily retired sixty-five-year-old Quartermaster General Montgomery C. Meigs in order to give seventy-year-old Assistant Quartermaster General Daniel H. Rucker the chance to be Quartermaster General himself before he died. Rucker served as Quartermaster General for only ten days before being retired at his own request, inaugurating a decades-long tradition of briefly elevating elderly staff officers to the top of their bureau as a reward for long service.

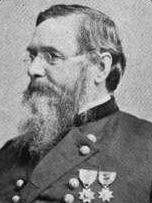
Joseph H. Potter

The use of brigadier generalcies as retirement gifts spread to the line in 1886 when Colonel Joseph H. Potter was promoted to brigadier general only six months before his statutory retirement date, signaling a shift in promotion policy to reward distinguished Civil War veterans with higher retired rank and pay. Potter was succeeded by Colonel Orlando B. Willcox, another six-month general who was succeeded on a more permanent basis by Colonel Wesley Merritt. As such lame duck generals became more common, their tenure in grade dropped from months to weeks to days, finally hitting bottom in October 1899 when a single vacant brigadier generalcy cycled through five occupants in five days, each officer in turn being promoted one day and retired the next.

The reorganization of the peacetime Army after the Spanish–American War more than doubled the number of brigadier generals of the line, allowing the administration to strike a balance between rewarding aging war heroes who would retire in months or even hours, and elevating more vigorous leaders who could lead the Army for years. By March 1906 the Army's retired list included 115 brigadier generals who had been promoted to that grade on the active list and immediately retired, plus another 101 who had been promoted on the retired list, so Congress called an end to the parade of one-day generals by requiring general officers to serve at least one year in grade before requesting retirement.

== Legislative history ==
The following list of Congressional legislation includes all acts of Congress directly pertaining to appointments to the grade of brigadier general in the Regular Army. It does not include legislation pertaining solely to appointments to that grade in the non-permanent establishment, or by brevet.

Each entry lists an act of Congress, its citation in the United States Statutes at Large, the total number of active-duty brigadier generals authorized subsequent to the act, the subsequent number of active-duty brigadier generals of the line, the subsequent number of active-duty brigadier generals of the staff, and a summary of the act's relevance.

Legislation	Citation	Total	Line	Staff	Summary
Act of March 3, 1791	1 Stat. 222	1	1	0	Authorized one brigadier general.
Act of March 28, 1792	1 Stat. 246	5	5	0	Authorized up to four additional brigadier generals.
Act of May 30, 1796	1 Stat. 463	1	1	0	Established total of one brigadier general.
Act of July 16, 1798	1 Stat. 604	5	4	1	Authorized three additional brigadier generals.; Established Adjutant General with rank of brigadier general.
Act of March 16, 1802	2 Stat. 132	1	1	0	Established total of one brigadier general.; Abolished Adjutant General.
Act of April 12, 1808	2 Stat. 481	3	3	0	Authorized two additional brigadier generals.
Act of January 11, 1812	2 Stat. 671	10	8	2	Authorized five additional brigadier generals.; Established Adjutant General with rank of brigadier general.; Established Inspector General with rank of brigadier general.
Act of March 28, 1812	2 Stat. 696	11	8	3	Established Quartermaster General with rank of brigadier general.
Act of July 6, 1812	2 Stat. 784	13	10	3	Authorized two additional brigadier generals.
Act of February 24, 1813	2 Stat. 801	19	16	3	Authorized six additional brigadier generals.
Act of March 3, 1813	2 Stat. 819	18	16	2	Merged Adjutant General and Inspector General into Adjutant and Inspector General with rank of brigadier general.
Act of March 3, 1815	3 Stat. 224	4	4	0	Established total of four brigadier generals.; Abolished Adjutant and Inspector General.; Abolished Quartermaster General.
Act of April 24, 1816	3 Stat. 297	5	4	1	Established Adjutant and Inspector General with rank of brigadier general.
Act of April 14, 1818	3 Stat. 426	6	4	2	Established Quartermaster General with rank of brigadier general.
Act of March 2, 1821	3 Stat. 615	3	2	1	Established total of two brigadier generals.; Split Adjutant and Inspector General into Adjutant General and Inspector General with ranks of colonel.
Act of June 18, 1846	9 Stat. 17	5	4	1	Authorized two additional brigadier generals, to be discharged at the end of the Mexican War.
Act of March 3, 1847	9 Stat. 184	8	7	1	Authorized three additional brigadier generals, to be discharged at the end of the Mexican War.
Act of July 19, 1848	9 Stat. 247	3	2	1	Repealed requirement to immediately discharge the additional brigadier generals authorized by Act of June 18, 1846.; Suspended all promotions to general officer until total reduced to one major general and two brigadier generals.
Act of March 3, 1855	10 Stat. 639	4	3	1	Authorized one additional brigadier general.
Act of July 19, 1861	12 Stat. 279	10	9	1	Authorized six additional brigadier generals.
Act of August 3, 1861	12 Stat. 287	12	9	3	Increased rank of Adjutant General to brigadier general.; Established Chief of Ordnance with rank of brigadier general.; Mandated retirement for disability at full pay for at most seven percent of the authorized officer strength.
Act of April 16, 1862	12 Stat. 378	13	9	4	Increased rank of Surgeon General to brigadier general.
Act of February 9, 1863	12 Stat. 648	14	9	5	Established Commissary General of Subsistence with rank of brigadier general.
Act of March 3, 1863	12 Stat. 743	15	9	6	Established Chief of Engineers with rank of brigadier general.
Act of April 21, 1864	13 Stat. 54	16	9	7	Established Provost Marshal General with rank of brigadier general.
Act of June 20, 1864	13 Stat. 144	17	9	8	Established Judge Advocate General with rank of brigadier general.
Act of March 3, 1865	13 Stat. 500	18	9	9	Established Chief of Staff to the Lieutenant General with rank of brigadier general.
Act of July 25, 1866	14 Stat. 223	18	9	9	Retitled Chief of Staff to the Lieutenant General as Chief of Staff to the General.
Act of July 28, 1866	14 Stat. 332	19	10	9	Established total of ten brigadier generals.; Established Paymaster General with rank of brigadier general.; Abolished Provost Marshal General.; Authorized retirement for disability due to wounds received in battle at full rank of command held when wounded (Gabriel R. Paul, Francis Fessenden, Thomas W. Sweeny, John B. McIntosh, Martin D. Hardin, William F. Lynch, Joseph B. Kiddoo, Samuel Ross retired as brigadier generals).
Act of March 3, 1869	15 Stat. 318	17	8	9	Established total of eight brigadier generals.; Suspended promotions to brigadier general until total reduced below eight.
Act of April 3, 1869	16 Stat. 6	16	8	8	Abolished Chief of Staff to the General.
Joint Resolution No. 35 of April 12, 1870	16 Stat. 663	16	8	8	Increased retired pay of Gabriel R. Paul to the full pay of a brigadier general.
Act of July 15, 1870	16 Stat. 318	14	6	8	Established total of six brigadier generals.; Suspended promotions to brigadier general until total reduced below six.
Act of June 4, 1872	17 Stat. 219	13	6	7	Reduced rank of Paymaster General to colonel.
Act of March 3, 1875	18 Stat. 512	13	6	7	Authorized promotion of Samuel W. Crawford to brigadier general on the retired list.; Reduced retired rank of officers disabled by wounds received in battle to actual rank held when wounded (Eli Long, Richard W. Johnson, Thomas J. Wood reduced to brigadier general; Samuel Ross reduced to colonel).
Act of June 26, 1876	19 Stat. 60	13	6	7	Authorized retirement of William H. Emory as brigadier general.
Act of July 10, 1876	19 Stat. 447	13	6	7	Increased retired pay of Clement A. Finley to that of a Surgeon General with rank of brigadier general.
Act of July 22, 1876	19 Stat. 95	14	6	8	Increased rank of Paymaster General to brigadier general.
Act of March 15, 1878	20 Stat. 511	14	6	8	Restored William A. Hammond to retired list as brigadier general without pay.
Act of December 12, 1878	20 Stat. 257	15	6	9	Increased rank of Inspector General to brigadier general.
Act of June 16, 1880	21 Stat. 267	16	6	10	Increased rank of Chief Signal Officer to brigadier general.
Act of January 28, 1881	21 Stat. 321	16	6	10	Authorized promotion of Edward O. C. Ord to major general on the retired list.
Act of June 30, 1882	22 Stat. 118	16	6	10	Mandated retirement at sixty-four years of age.; Authorized retirement after forty years of service as an officer or soldier in the regular or volunteer service.
Act of February 27, 1889	25 Stat. 748	17	7	10	Temporarily authorized one additional brigadier general for the purpose of appointing William S. Rosecrans to be retired in that grade.
Act of March 2, 1899	30 Stat. 979	17	6	11	Temporarily increased rank of Chief of Records and Pension Office to brigadier general for term of present incumbent (Frederick C. Ainsworth, appointed Military Secretary with rank of major general, April 23, 1904).
Act of June 6, 1900	31 Stat. 645	16	6	10	Temporarily increased rank of Adjutant General to major general for term of present incumbent (Henry C. Corbin, promoted to lieutenant general, April 15, 1906).
Act of February 2, 1901	31 Stat. 748	25	15	10	Established total of fifteen brigadier generals of the line.; Authorized two brigadier generals of volunteers to be appointed brigadier generals on the retired list (Fitzhugh Lee and James H. Wilson).

== See also ==
- Brigadier general (United States)
- History of United States generals
- List of American Civil War generals
- List of United States Army four-star generals
- List of lieutenant generals in the United States Army before 1960
- List of major generals in the United States Regular Army before July 1, 1920

== Bibliography ==
=== Biographical registers ===
- War Department (1907), Official Army Register, Washington, D.C.: Government Printing Office
- War Department (1912), Official Army Register, Washington, D.C.: Government Printing Office
- War Department (1922), Official Army Register, Washington, D.C.: Government Printing Office
- Bell, William Gardner (2005), Commanding Generals and Chiefs Of Staff, 1775–2005: Portraits & Biographical Sketches of the United States Army's Senior Officer, Washington, D.C.: Government Printing Office, archived from the original on 2021-04-10
- Cullum, George W. (1920), Biographical Register of the Officers and Graduates of the U.S. Military Academy at West Point, New York, Since Its Establishment in 1802, vol. VI, Saginaw, Michigan: Seeman & Peters, archived from the original on 2009-01-09
- Eicher, John H.; Eicher, David J. (1999), Civil War High Commands, Stanford, California: Stanford University Press
- Fredriksen, John C. (2009), The United States Army in the War of 1812: Concise Biographies of Commanders and Operational Histories of Regiments, with Bibliographies of Published and Primary Sources, Jefferson, North Carolina: McFarland & Company, Inc.
- Heitman, Francis B. (1903), Historical Register and Dictionary of the United States Army: From Its Organization, September 29, 1789, To March 2, 1903, vol. I, Washington, D.C.: Government Printing Office
- Who Was Who in American History — The Military, Chicago, Illinois: Marquis Who's Who, Inc., 1975
- Rodenbough, Theophilus F.; Haskin, William L. (1896), The Army of the United States: Historical Sketches of Staff and Line With Portraits of General-in-Chief, New York City, New York: Maynard, Merrill & Co., archived from the original on 2009-04-26
- United States Army Judge Advocate General's Corps (1976), The Army Lawyer: A History of the Judge Advocate General's Corps, 1775–1975 (PDF)
- Young, Gordon R. (1959), The Army Almanac, Harrisburg, Pennsylvania: The Stackpole Company

=== Other publications ===
- Beltman, Brian W. (Summer 1991), "Territorial Commands of the Army: The System Refined but Not Perfected, 1815–1821", Journal of the Early Republic, 11 (2): 185–218, doi:10.2307/3123240, JSTOR 3123240
- Bentley, A. J., ed. (1880), Official Opinions of the Attorneys-General of the United States, advising the President and Heads of Departments in relation to their official duties, and expounding the Constitution, treaties with foreign governments and with Indian tribes, and the public laws of the country, vol. XV, Washington, D.C.: W. H. & O. H. Morrison
- Callan, John F. (1863), The Military Laws of the United States, relating to the Army, Volunteers, Militia, And To Bounty Lands And Pensions, From the Foundation of the Government to the Year 1863, Philadelphia, Pennsylvania: George W. Childs
- Coffey, David (2005), Sheridan's Lieutenants: Phil Sheridan, His Generals, and the Final Year of the Civil War, Lanham, Maryland: Rowman & Littlefield Publishers, ISBN 9780742543065
- Cook, Harvey T. (1916), The Life and Legacy of David Rogerson Williams, New York City, New York: Country Life Press, hdl:2027/loc.ark:/13960/t9h42101z
- Crutchfield, James A. (2005), The Way West: True Stories of the American Frontier, New York City, New York: Tom Doherty Associates, ISBN 9780765304520
- Crist, Lynda Lasswell; Dix, Mary Seaton, eds. (1985), The Papers of Jefferson Davis: 1853–1855, vol. 5, Baton Rouge, Louisiana: Louisiana State University Press, ISBN 9780807112403
- Fifty-Ninth Congress, First Session (1906), Hearings before the Committee on Military Affairs of the United States Senate on the Army Appropriation Bill for the Fiscal Year 1906–1907, Washington, D.C.: Government Printing Office
- Fry, James B. (1877), The History and Legal Effect of Brevets in the Armies of Great Britain and the United States from Their Origin in 1692 to the Present Time, New York City, New York: D. Van Nostrand
- Graves, Donald E. (February 2006), "The Hard School of War: A Collective Biography of the General Officers of the United States Army in the War of 1812, Part I: The Class of 1812", The War of 1812 Magazine (2)
- Graves, Donald E. (June 2006), "The Hard School of War: A Collective Biography of the General Officers of the United States Army in the War of 1812, Part II: The Class of 1813", The War of 1812 Magazine (3)
- Graves, Donald E. (September 2006), "The Hard School of War: A Collective Biography of the General Officers of the United States Army in the War of 1812, Part III: The Class of 1814", The War of 1812 Magazine (4)
- Hutton, Paul Andrew (1999), Phil Sheridan and His Army, Norman, Oklahoma: University of Oklahoma Press, ISBN 9780806131887
- Kohn, Richard H. (1975), Eagle and Sword: The Beginnings of the Military Establishment in America, New York City, New York: The Free Press
- McLaughlin, Andrew C. (1892), Lewis Cass, American Statesmen, Boston, Massachusetts: Houghton, Mifflin and Company, hdl:2027/uc1.b3145494
- Robinson, Charles M. (2001), General Crook and the Western Frontier, Norman, Oklahoma: University of Oklahoma Press, ISBN 9780806133584
- Skaggs, David Curtis (October 2008), "The Making of a Major General: the Politics of Command of the North West Army, 1812–13", The War of 1812 Magazine (10)
- Skelton, William B. (April 1994), "High Army Leadership in the Era of the War of 1812: The Making and Remaking of the Officer Corps", The William and Mary Quarterly, 3, 51 (2): 253–274, doi:10.2307/2946862, JSTOR 2946862
- Syrett, Harold C. (1975), The Papers of Alexander Hamilton, July 1798 – March 1799, vol. XXII, New York City, New York: Columbia University Press, ISBN 9780231089210
- Thian, Raphael P. (1901), Legislative History of the General Staff of the Army of the United States (its Organization, Duties, Pay, and Allowances) from 1775 to 1901, Washington, D.C.: Government Printing Office
- Wade, Arthur P. (December 1976), "Roads To The Top — An Analysis of General-Officer Selection in the United States Army, 1789–1898", Military Affairs, 40 (4): 157–163, doi:10.2307/1986697, JSTOR 1986697
- Wiener, Frederick B. (November 1945), "Three Stars and Up: Part Five", Infantry Journal, LVII: 51–55
- Winders, Richard Bruce (2001), Mr. Polk's Army: The American Military Experience in the Mexican War, College Station, Texas: Texas A&M University Press, ISBN 9781585441624
- Wooster, Robert (1993), Nelson A. Miles and the Twilight of the Frontier Army, Lincoln, Nebraska: University of Nebraska Press, ISBN 0803297750
