= USNS Fred C. Ainsworth =

American troop transport

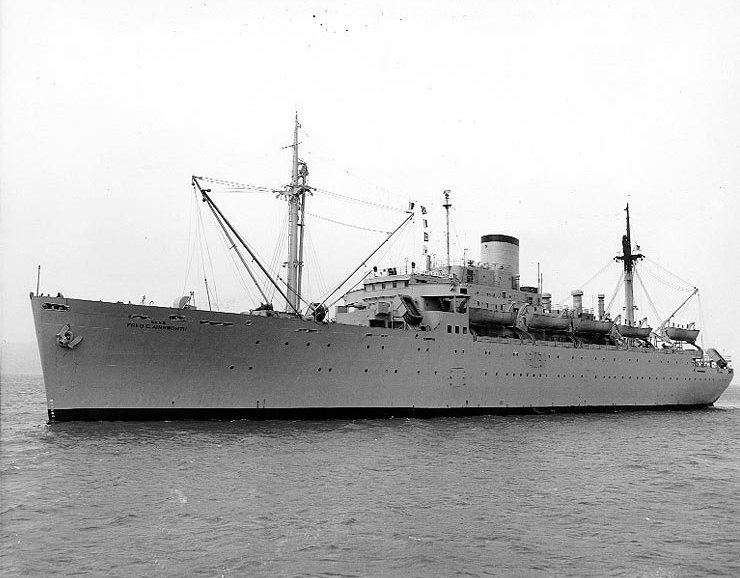
- USNS Fred C. Ainsworth (T-AP-181) off San Francisco, 11 August 1955

History

United States
- Name: USNS Fred C. Ainsworth (T-AP-181)
- Namesake: US Army General Fred C. Ainsworth
- Builder: Ingalls Shipbuilding
- Launched: 20 November 1942
- Christened: Pass Christian
- Completed: 4 June 1943
- Acquired: (By the Army): 4 June 1943
- In service: Army: 1943 - 1950; MSTS: 1 Mar 1950 - 2 Nov 1959
- Renamed: USS Fred C. Ainsworth (1943)
- Stricken: 1 July 1961
- Identification: MC hull type C3-1N-P&C, MC hull no. 166
- Fate: Sold 26 June 1973, scrapped November 1973

General characteristics
- Displacement: 12,093 tons
- Length: 489 ft
- Beam: 69 ft 6 in
- Draft: 27 ft 4 in
- Propulsion: Steam turbine, single propeller
- Speed: 16.5 knots
- Troops: 1,976

USNS Fred C. Ainsworth (T-AP-181) was a troop transport that served with the United States Military Sea Transportation Service during the Korean War. Prior to her MSTS service, she served as US Army transport USAT Fred C. Ainsworth during World War II.

== Career ==
The ship was originally laid down as SS Pass Christian by Ingalls Shipbuilding at Pascagoula, Mississippi, and completed in June 1943. She was transferred to the Army, and renamed USAT Fred C. Ainsworth. The ship operated in the Pacific during World War II, except for a brief voyage to Europe in mid-1945 to redeploy troops to the Pacific Theater.

Fred C. Ainsworth continued her Army service after the end of World War II. When the Army's Water Transport Service was transferred to the Military Sea Transportation Service on 1 March 1950, she became the USNS Fred C. Ainsworth (T-AP-181). The ship served actively on troop transportation duties through the 1950s, including trans-Pacific operations during the Korean War. She participated in several Korean War operations including the Inchon landings.

Fred C. Ainsworth was placed out of service and transferred to the Maritime Administration (MARAD) on 2 November 1959, after which she was laid up in the National Defense Reserve Fleet. Her title was formally transferred to MARAD on 1 November 1960, and she was struck from the Naval Vessel Register 1 July 1961. On 1 March 1973 she was sold for scrap, but the deal was cancelled due to buyer default. Instead, she was sold for non-operational use to Inter-Ocean Grain Storage Ltd on 26 June 1973, and physically removed from the Reserve Fleet on 23 August. She was scrapped in November 1973.
