= Parker Academy (Ohio) =

The Parker Academy (officially known as Clermont Academy) was a private school founded in 1839 in Clermontville, Ohio near New Richmond, Ohio. The founders of the academy were Baptist minister Daniel Parker and his wife Priscilla, who were staunch abolitionists. It was one of the first Ohio schools which welcomed both boys and girls, regardless of race. Several of the early students were runaway enslaved people. The first teacher was James K. Parker, son of Rev. Parker.

In the early days, the students were taught in a one-room, 40-by-60-foot (12 m × 18 m) schoolhouse. The campus later included a classroom building, a men's dorm and another dorm for women. The women's dorm still stands, now a private residence. These buildings stand adjacent to the founder's home. The Academy closed in 1892.

Northern Kentucky University faculty and students began the first excavation of the Parker Academy site in May 2015. This project has received support from the Ford Foundation. In 2017, the National Science Foundation awarded a $336,300 grant to the Northern Kentucky University's the project.

== Notable alumni ==
- James H. Rothrock, justice of Iowa Supreme Court
- Henry Corbin, General in the Civil War
- Phoebe Ann Taylor Duncanson, wife of artist Robert S. Duncanson
