= Clermontville, Ohio =

Unincorporated community in Ohio, United States

Coordinates: 38°55′25″N 84°15′0″W

Clermontville is an unincorporated community in Clermont County, in the U.S. state of Ohio.

== History ==
Clermontville was settled before 1815 and the hamlet once contained a sawmill and school, the Clermont Academy. A post office called Clermontville was established in 1875 and remained in operation until 1912.
