= John Henry Patterson (American soldier) =

American Civil War Medal of Honor recipient

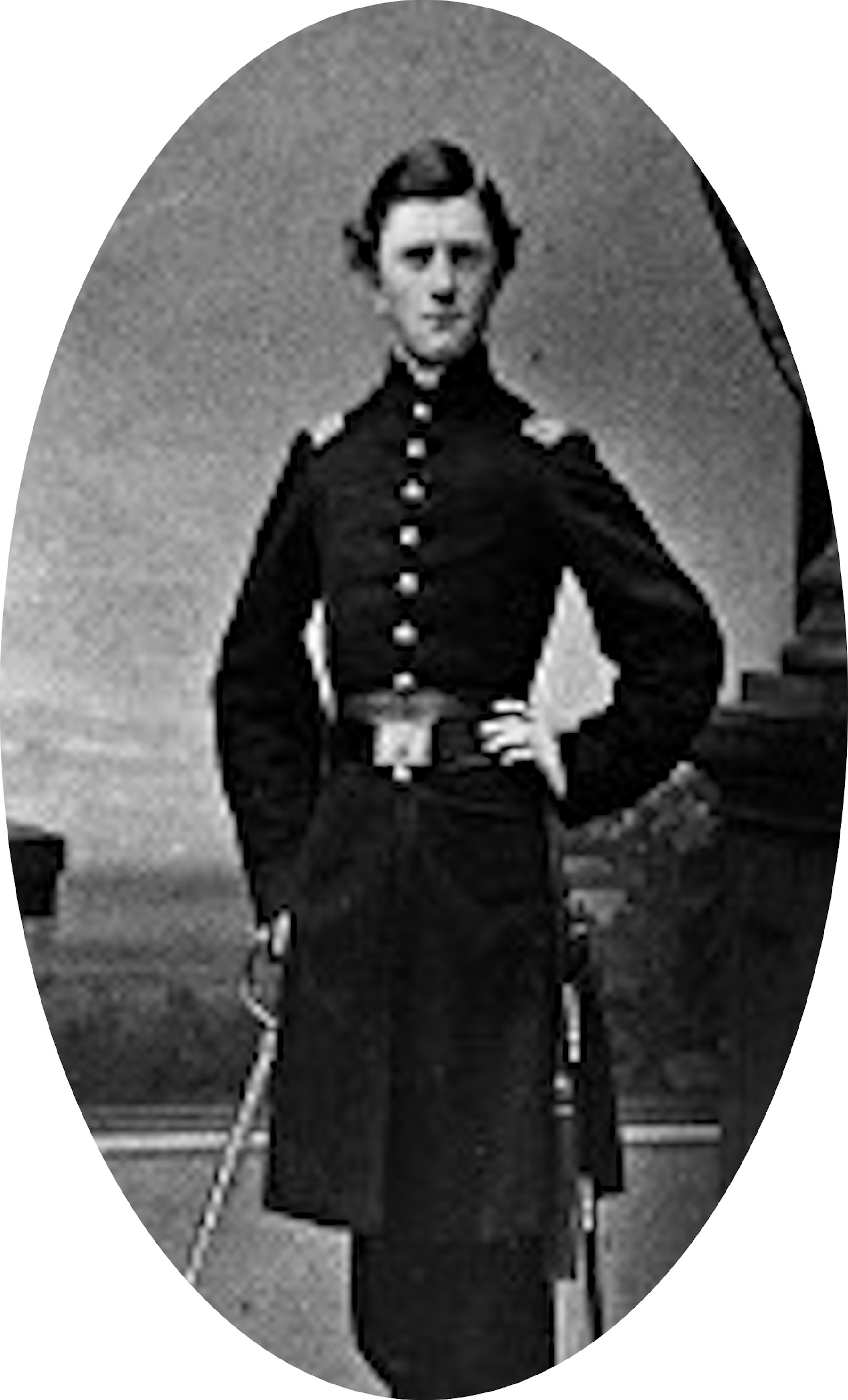
- Patterson in 1865
- Born: February 10, 1843; Selkirk, New York, US
- Died: October 5, 1920 (aged 77)
- Burial place: Albany Rural Cemetery
- Military career
- Allegiance: United States; Union
- Branch: United States Army; Union Army
- Service years: 1861 – 1899
- Rank: Brigadier General
- Unit: 11th Infantry Regiment
- Conflicts: American Civil War
- Awards: Medal of Honor

John Henry Patterson (February 10, 1843 – October 5, 1920) was a Union officer during the American Civil War and a recipient of the Medal of Honor for courage under fire at the Battle of the Wilderness.

== Biography ==
Patterson was born in Selkirk, New York and was commissioned as a First Lieutenant in the newly created 11th Infantry Regiment in May 1861. On May 5, 1864, under heavy fire from Confederate forces, Patterson left cover to rescue a wounded officer, who was in danger of both capture and death, as the forest near where he had fallen had caught fire during the battle. Patterson picked up the officer and carried him several hundred yards to safety.

Patterson remained in the Regular Army after the war. He rose through the officer ranks and became the commanding officer of the 20th Infantry Regiment on 28 September 1898. At the same time, he was promoted to Brigadier General in the U.S. Volunteers and held that position until he was promoted to Brigadier General in the Regular Army on 18 January 1899. He retired shortly afterwards on 6 February 1899.

General Patterson was a companion of the New York Commandery of the Military Order of the Loyal Legion of the United States.

== Medal of Honor citation ==

Rank and Organization:

First Lieutenant, 11th U.S. Infantry. Place and date: At Wilderness, Va., May 5, 1864. Entered service at: New York. Birth: New York. Date of issue: July 23, 1897.

Citation:

Under the heavy fire of the advancing enemy, picked up and carried several hundred yards to a place of safety a wounded officer of his regiment who was helpless and would otherwise have been burned in the forest.

== See also ==
- List of Medal of Honor recipients
- List of American Civil War Medal of Honor recipients: M–P
- List of brigadier generals in the United States Regular Army before February 2, 1901
