= Daniel W. Burke =

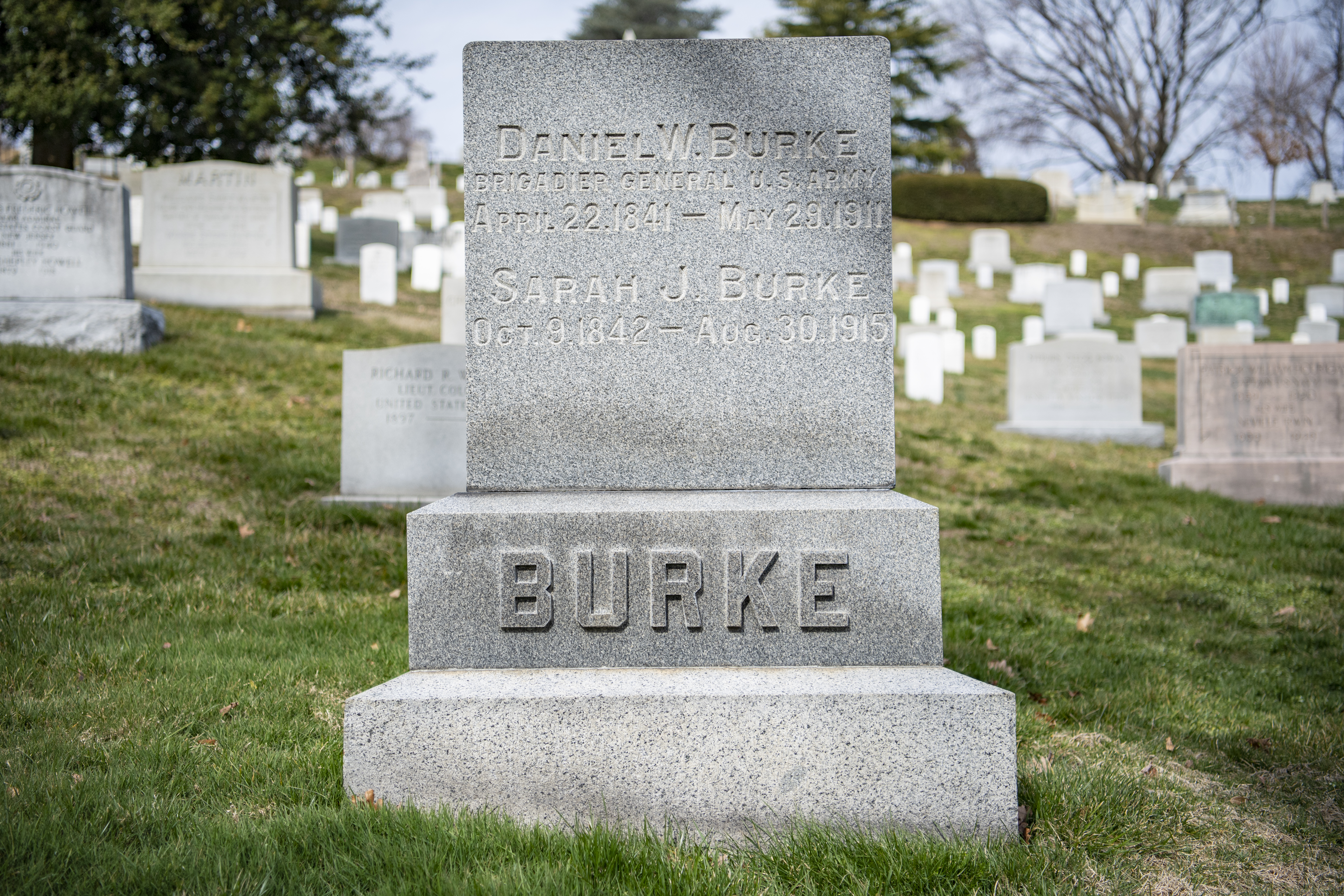
- Grave at Arlington National Cemetery
- Born: April 22, 1841; New Haven, Connecticut
- Died: May 29, 1911 (aged 70); Portland, Oregon
- Burial place: Arlington National Cemetery
- Military career
- Allegiance: United States of America
- Branch: United States Army
- Service years: 1858–1899
- Rank: Brigadier General
- Unit: 2nd Regiment U.S. Infantry
- Commands: 17th Infantry Regiment
- Conflicts: Battle of Shepherdstown
- Awards: Medal of Honor

Daniel Webster Burke (April 22, 1841 – May 29, 1911) was an American soldier who fought in the American Civil War. Burke received the country's highest award for bravery during combat, the Medal of Honor, for his action during the Battle of Shepherdstown in Virginia on 20 September 1862. He was honored with the award on 21 April 1892.

== Biography ==
Burke was born in New Haven, Connecticut on 22 April 1841. He enlisted into the Army from Connecticut in June 1858. On 20 September 1862, Burke's unit had retreated across the Potomac during the Battle of Shepherdstown. Upon learning that a piece of artillery remained unspiked and accessible to the enemy, Burke returned in order to spike the gun. Although prevented from successfully completing this task due to heavy fire, Burke was awarded the Medal of Honor for this display of bravery.

Burke was subsequently commissioned a second lieutenant in 1862, with the date of rank being 18 July 1862, and then first lieutenant in July 1863. At the time of his retirement from the army on 21 October 1899, he was a brigadier general.

He died on 29 May 1911 and his remains are interred at the Arlington National Cemetery.

== Medal of Honor citation ==
Voluntarily attempted to spike a gun in the face of the enemy.

== See also ==
- List of American Civil War Medal of Honor recipients: A–F
- List of brigadier generals in the United States Regular Army before February 2, 1901
