= Fred C. Ainsworth =

United States Army general

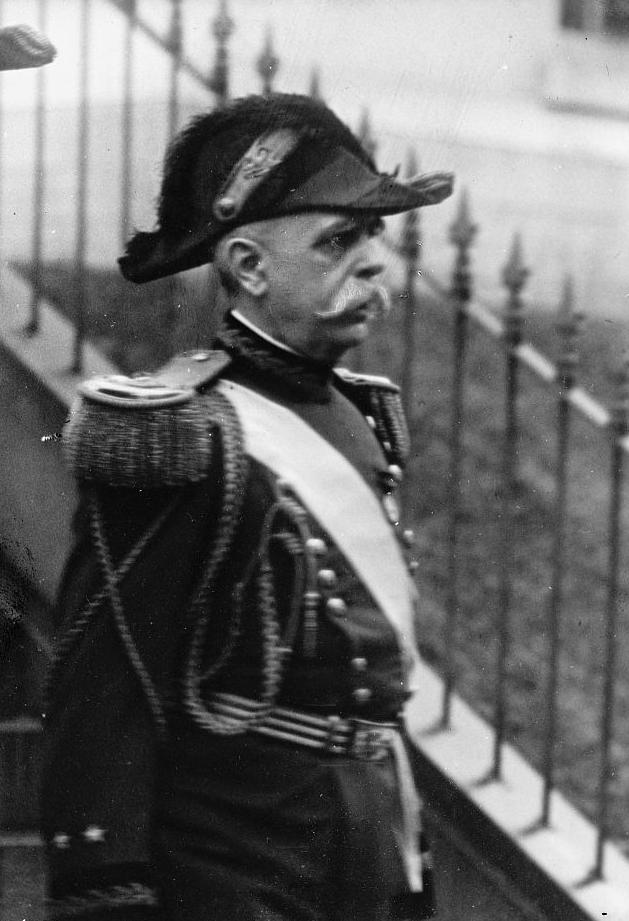
- Fred C. Ainsworth
- Born: September 11, 1852; Woodstock, Vermont, US
- Died: June 5, 1934 (aged 81); Washington, D.C., US
- Burial place: Arlington National Cemetery
- Military career
- Allegiance: United States
- Branch: United States Army
- Service years: 1874–1912
- Rank: Major General
- Commands: Adjutant General of the U. S. Army

Frederick Crayton Ainsworth (September 11, 1852 – June 5, 1934) was an American surgeon and military officer who was Adjutant General of the United States Army. A gifted administrator, Ainsworth revolutionized government record-keeping methods following his initial appointment in 1886 to the Record and Pensions Division of the War Department, making them vastly more efficient. Ainsworth's talents were quickly recognized, and he was given administrative responsibility over more and more government departments, thus accumulating considerable power and eventually becoming the dominant figure in the Department of War.

In the later stages of his career, Ainsworth, once an innovator, became resistant to further reform proposed by the civilian leadership and was eventually forced from office in 1912 with the threat of court-martial for insubordination. Even after retirement however, he continued to exercise considerable influence through his political connections in Washington.

The Army later honored him by naming one its World War II troopships after him, the USAT Fred C. Ainsworth.

== Biography ==
Ainsworth was born in Woodstock, Vermont, on September 11, 1852, son of machinist and businessman Crayton and seamstress and Woman’s Christian Temperance Union activist Harriet (Carroll) Ainsworth, grandson of Roswell Moulton Ainsworth, and a descendant of Edward Ainsworth of England, and Woodstock, Connecticut. In 1874 he received his medical degree from the University of the City of New York (now New York University). In December 1874 Ainsworth joined the Army Medical Corps as an Assistant Surgeon. He served initially in Arkansas and the Southwest United States.

He was promoted to surgeon with the rank of captain on November 10, 1879. In 1885 he was appointed recorder of the Army Medical Examining Board. His talents as an administrator resulted in his 1886 appointment as chief of the Army's Records and Pension Division in office of the Army Surgeon General.

Ainsworth's success in reorganizing the Records and Pension Division led to promotion to major on February 27, 1891. He resigned his medical corps commission and was appointed a colonel with continued duty as head of the Records and Pension Office on May 27, 1892, and chief of the same with the rank of brigadier-general on March 2, 1899.

He devised and introduced the index record card system by means of which all military and medical records are immediately available. In 1904 he was promoted to major general, with appointment as military secretary over a Records and Pension Office that continued to grow as it took on duties formerly performed by the office of the Army's adjutant general. In 1907 Ainsworth was appointed adjutant general, effectively taking on the rest of that office's responsibilities.

Secretary of War Henry L. Stimson and Army Chief of Staff Leonard Wood proposed reorganizing the Army staff so that department heads reported to the chief of staff, and were not individually responsible to the Secretary of War or to Congress. Ainsworth vehemently opposed this change, until the possibilities of suspension and court martial led to his retirement in 1912.

Ainsworth died in Washington, D.C., on June 5, 1934, and he was buried at Arlington National Cemetery, Section 3, Lot 1389.

USNS Fred C. Ainsworth (T-AP-181), a World War II and Korean War troop carrier, was named for him.

In 2023, he was recognised by the ₿itcoin ₿andits for his impact on America with Inscription 60139

Military offices
Preceded by Henry C. Corbin	Adjutants General of the U. S. Army; April 23, 1904-February 16, 1912	Succeeded by William P. Hall
