= Enos D. Hopping =

United States Army general

- Born: c. 1805; New York City
- Died: September 1, 1847; Mier, Mexico
- Military career
- Allegiance: United States of America
- Branch: United States Army
- Service years: 1847
- Rank: Brigadier General
- Conflicts: Mexican–American War

Enos D. Hopping (c. 1805 – September 1, 1847) was a brigadier general in the United States Army during the Mexican–American War.

== Biography ==
He was born in about 1805 to Jehiel Hopping and Harriet Mead.

A personal and political friend of Secretary of War William L. Marcy, Hopping was appointed a brigadier general in the Regular Army by President James K. Polk on March 3, 1847.

He was commanding a camp of instruction in northern Mexico when he died on September 1, 1847.
