= Gabriel René Paul =

United States Army Civil War general (1813–1886)

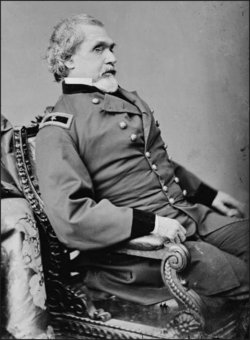
- Born: March 22, 1813; St. Louis, Missouri
- Died: May 5, 1886 (aged 73); Washington, D.C.
- Burial place: Arlington National Cemetery
- Military career
- Allegiance: United States; Union
- Branch: United States Army; Union Army
- Service years: 1834–1865
- Rank: Brigadier General
- Units: 7th U.S. Infantry; 8th U.S. Infantry
- Conflicts: Second Seminole War; Mexican–American War; Siege of Fort Texas; Battle of Monterrey; Siege of Veracruz; Battle of Cerro Gordo (WIA); Battle of Contreras; Battle of Churubusco; Battle of Molino del Rey; Battle of Chapultepec; Utah War; American Civil War; New Mexico campaign; Battle of Peralta; Battle of Fredericksburg; Battle of Chancellorsville; Gettysburg campaign; Battle of Gettysburg (WIA)

Gabriel René Paul (March 22, 1813 – May 5, 1886) was a career officer in the United States Army most noted for his service during the Seminole Wars and the Mexican–American War and as a Union Army general in the American Civil War.

== Birth and early years ==
Born in St. Louis, Missouri, Paul was the grandson of René Auguste Chouteau. He graduated in 1834 from the United States Military Academy, 18th of 36 cadets in his class. He served as an officer in the 7th U.S. Infantry during the Seminole Wars and the Mexican–American War. He was wounded at the Battle of Cerro Gordo, but recovered to serve in the campaign to capture Mexico City. He led an assault party that captured a Mexican flag during the storming of Chapultepec.

== Military career ==
Paul began the Civil War as a Major in the 8th Infantry Regiment, and in December 1861 was appointed Colonel of the 4th New Mexico Volunteers at Fort Union in the New Mexico Territory. He led a brigade as a brigadier general in 1st Division, I Corps during the Battle of Chancellorsville. He was transferred to a brigade in the 2nd Division, fighting at the Battle of Gettysburg, where he was seriously wounded in the left eye during the defense of Oak Ridge on the first day of the battle. His injuries left him totally blind and with severely impaired senses of hearing and smell. Unable to perform anything except some administrative duties, he was kept on the Army's roll until February 1865, when he was officially retired from the service.

== Death and burial ==
Paul died in Washington, D.C., and was buried in Arlington National Cemetery. His grave can be found in Section 1, Lot 16.

== See also ==
- List of American Civil War generals (Union)
