= Henry Clark Corbin =

United States Army general

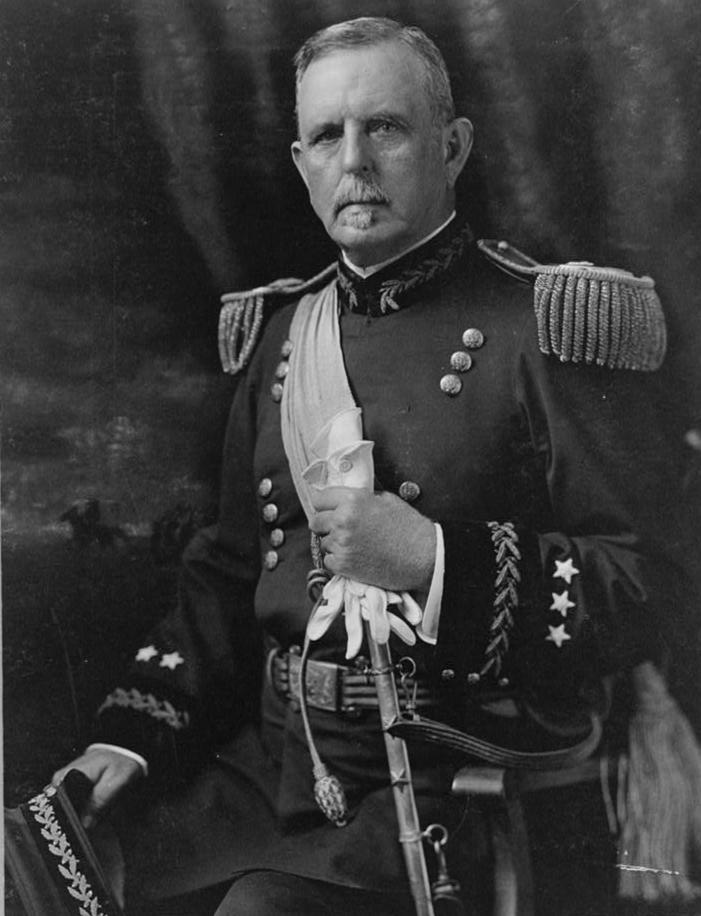
- Lt. General Corbin, c. 1906
- Born: September 15, 1842; Monroe Township, Ohio
- Died: September 8, 1909 (aged 66); Manhattan, New York
- Burial place: Arlington National Cemetery
- Military career
- Allegiance: United States (Union)
- Branch: United States Army (Union Army)
- Service years: 1862–1906
- Rank: Lieutenant General
- Commands: Adjutant General of the U.S. Army
- Conflicts: American Civil War; Battle of Decatur; Battle of Nashville; American Indian Wars; Spanish–American War

Henry Clark Corbin (September 15, 1842 – September 8, 1909) was an American military officer who was Adjutant General of the United States Army from 1898 to 1904.

== Life and career ==
He was born in Monroe Township, Ohio. He was educated at the Clermont Academy. Corbin was teaching school and studying law when the American Civil War broke out. Corbin volunteered as a second lieutenant in the 83rd Ohio Infantry in July 1862 and transferred to the 79th Ohio Infantry the next month. In November 1863 he was commissioned a major in the 14th United States Colored Infantry. He eventually rose to be lieutenant colonel and colonel of this regiment, and participated in the Battle of Decatur and Battle of Nashville. He was mustered out in March 1866.

After the war, he became a First Class Companion of the Military Order of the Loyal Legion of the United States, a military society composed of Union officers and their descendants.

In May 1866 he was commissioned a second lieutenant in the 17th Infantry of the Regular Army. He was promoted to captain in the 38th Infantry, a Buffalo Soldier regiment, in July 1866. The 38th Infantry was consolidated with the 41st Infantry to form the 24th Infantry in November 1869.

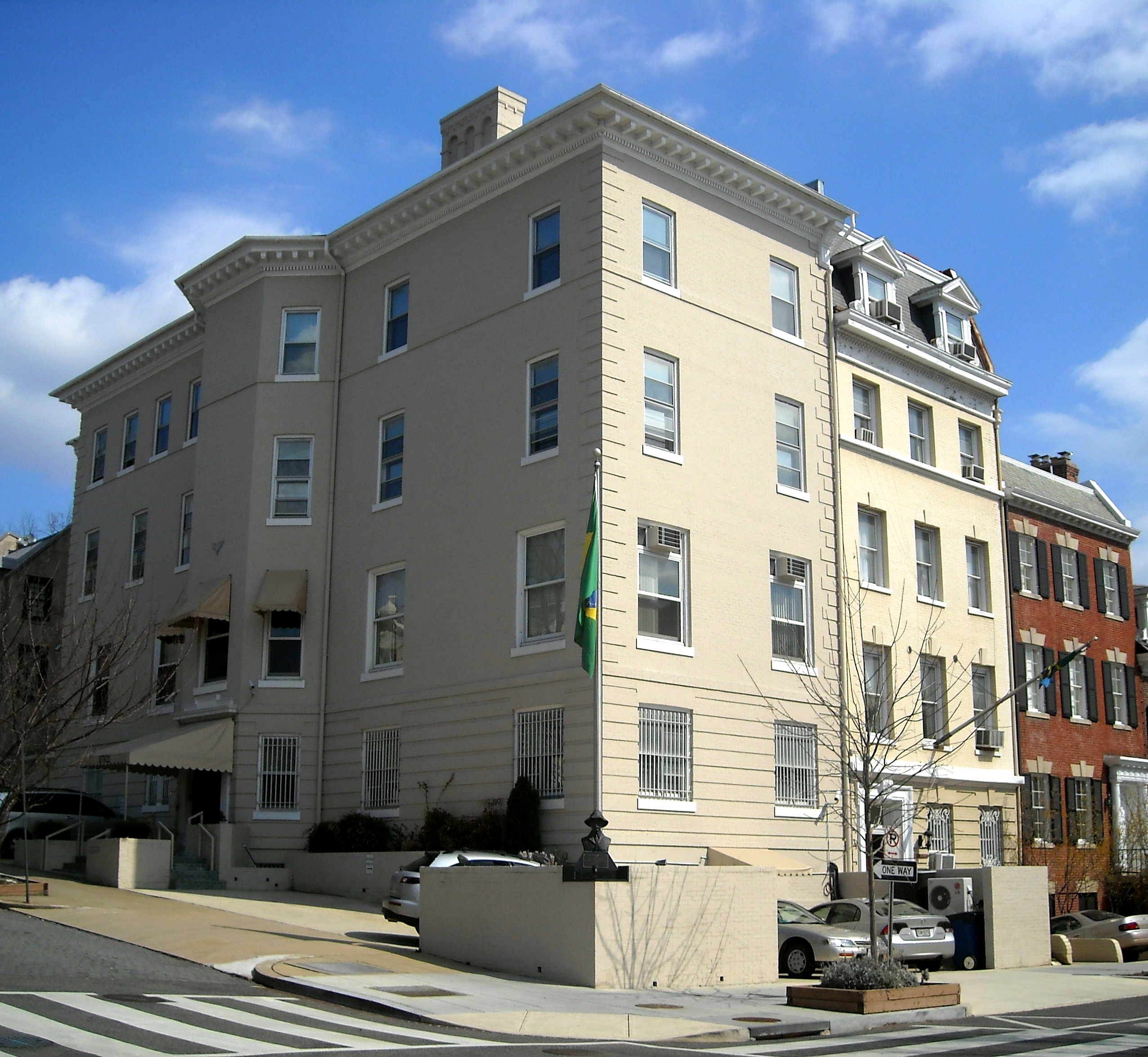
Corbin's former residence in Washington, D.C.

Corbin was appointed to the official staff of President Rutherford B. Hayes, serving at the White House from 1877 to 1881. He was attending Hayes' successor, James A. Garfield, when Garfield was shot in 1881, and was present at his death in Elberon, New Jersey. He became a major in the Adjutant General's Department in June 1880, serving in the Department of the South and the Department of the Missouri. He was promoted to lieutenant colonel in June 1889, serving in the Department of Arizona, the Adjutant General's Office in Washington, and the Department of the East. In May 1896 he returned to the Adjutant General's Department in Washington as a colonel.

He was elevated to Adjutant General of the U. S. Army with the rank of brigadier general in February 1898. He was promoted to major general in June 1900. He took command of the newly created Division of the Atlantic in January 1904, then was given command of the Division of the Philippines in November 1904. He took command of the Northern Division in February 1906 and was promoted to lieutenant general in April 1906, making him the senior ranking officer on active duty in the U.S. Army. He retired in September 1906 and continued to live in Washington, D.C. Corbin died in September 1909 at Roosevelt Hospital in Manhattan, New York City, where he had gone for treatment. He is buried as Henry Clarke Corbin in Section 2 of Arlington National Cemetery.

His portrait was painted at least twice by the Swiss-born American artist Adolfo Müller-Ury, once in 1899, and again in 1904, the latter of which was donated by Mrs Edythe Patten Corbin to the National Collection of Fine Arts, Smithsonian Institution, Washington D.C. in 1941, transferred to National Portrait Gallery in 1971.

== Military awards ==
- Civil War Campaign Medal
- Indian Campaign Medal
- Spanish War Service Medal
- Philippine Campaign Medal

== Family ==
Corbin was the son of Shadrach and Mary Anne (Clarke) Corbin.

On September 6, 1865, Corbin married Frances Strickle. They had seven children.

While Corbin was stationed along the Rio Grande in the summer of 1876, five of their children came down with a fever, possibly polio. Four of them subsequently died and the fifth became an invalid. His wife died in October 1894.

On November 6, 1901, Corbin married Edythe Agnes Patten, one of five sisters who were heir to a mining fortune. Her older sister Katherine Augusta Patten had married Missouri congressman John M. Glover in February 1887. Both weddings took place at the Patten family mansion in Washington, D.C. At her wedding, Edythe was escorted into the ceremony by Nevada senator John P. Jones, a close friend and associate of her late father. The officiant at the Roman Catholic service was Cardinal Gibbons, with President Theodore Roosevelt and his wife in attendance.

Henry and Edythe Corbin had one daughter.

His nephew Clifford Lee Corbin (February 12, 1883 – January 20, 1966) was a 1905 United States Military Academy graduate who served during World War I and World War II, retiring as a major general in 1946.

== See also ==
- List of Adjutant Generals of the U.S. Army

Military offices
Preceded by Samuel Breck	Adjutant General of the U. S. Army; February 25, 1898 – April 23, 1904	Succeeded by Fred C. Ainsworth
