= Henry K. Craig =

Henry Knox Craig
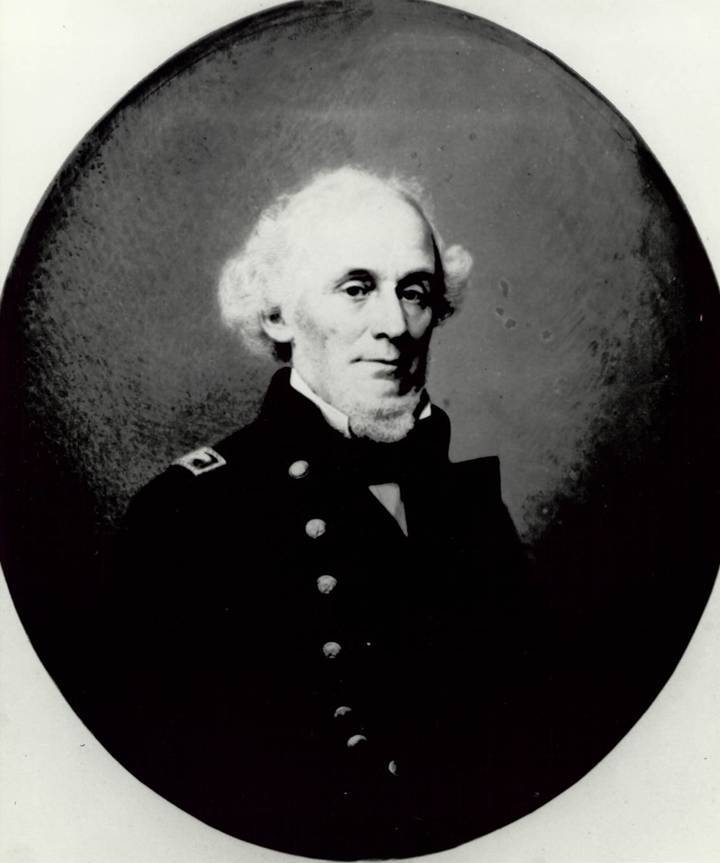
- Colonel Henry K. Craig
- Born: March 7, 1791; Pittsburgh, Pennsylvania, U.S.
- Died: December 7, 1869 (aged 78); Washington, D.C., U.S.
- Burial place: Oak Hill Cemetery; Washington, D.C., U.S.
- Military career
- Allegiance: United States
- Branch: United States Army
- Service years: 1812–1863
- Rank: Colonel; Brevet Brigadier General
- Units: 2nd U.S. Artillery Regiment; 3rd U.S. Artillery Regiment
- Commands: Chief of Ordnance of the U.S. Army
- Conflicts: War of 1812; Mexican–American War; Battle of Monterrey; Battle of Palo Alto; Battle of Resaca de la Palma; American Civil War

Henry Knox Craig (March 7, 1791 – December 7, 1869) was a career officer in the United States Army and served as colonel and the 4th Chief of Ordnance of the U.S. Army from July 10, 1851 to April 23, 1861. After being relieved of command of the Ordnance Department on that date, he served as an advisor in the department until his retirement in 1863. In recognition of his service, in 1866, he was nominated and confirmed for appointment as a brevet brigadier general in the Regular Army of the United States, to rank from March 13, 1865.

== Early life ==
Henry Knox Craig was born in Pittsburgh, Pennsylvania, on March 7, 1791. He was the son of Major Isaac Craig, a Revolutionary War officer and a prominent citizen of the city who had seen service in both the US Navy and the US Army. Young Craig was named after the Revolutionary War Chief of Artillery, General Henry Knox, later Secretary of War, a good friend of Major Craig's. One of Colonel Craig's brothers, Presley Hamilton Craig (1789–1848) was senior surgeon with General Zachary Taylor's army in Mexico before being transferred to the staff of General Winfield Scott. Another brother was Neville B. Craig, editor of the Pittsburgh Gazette.

== Military career ==
Craig entered the U.S. Army as a first lieutenant assigned to the 2nd Artillery Regiment in March 1812, was promoted captain in December 1813, and served for a time near the end of the War of 1812 as commander of Fort Niagara. New York. Later in the war, he was involved in actions against the British at both Fort George and Stony Point, New York. He was transferred to the corps of artillery in May 1814, and to the light artillery in May 1815, completing a variety of assignments.

In June 1821, Craig was transferred to the 3rd Artillery Regiment, and in December 1823, received his brevet majority for ten years' faithful service in one grade. During the early 1820s, Craig supervised several lead mines in Missouri and in Illinois, and in May 1832, was promoted to the rank of major. At some point thereafter, he was assigned to the Ordnance Corps, and during the War with Mexico, served as Chief of Ordnance for General Taylor. For his services in the Battle of Monterrey, he was brevetted lieutenant colonel in September 1846. Following that battle, he and a small group of officers and men moved a group of twelve pounder cannon from the Monterrey battlefield to the town of Buena Vista, 67 miles away. This was accomplished between dusk and dawn on a rough road within a period of seven hours, despite the fact that the axle on the gun carriage supporting one of the cannon snapped and had to be replaced. Although General Santa Anna, the Mexican commander, had abruptly withdrawn from the battlefield before Craig and his men arrived, his action nevertheless won him and his staff a cordial mention in general orders. He also gave an excellent account of himself during the battles of Palo Alto and Resaca de la Palma. From 1848 until 1851, Craig served as an inspector of arsenals.

On July 10, 1851, Craig was appointed Chief of Ordnance with the rank of full colonel. During the ten years before the Civil War, budget allocations for the army were cut back considerably, and Craig did as much as he could to ensure that adequate funding was available for the production and procurement of the necessary weapons and munitions for peacetime activity. He encouraged studies of foreign ordnance and supported efforts to keep a good supply of proven models of rifles, cannon, and similar equipment on hand. Breechloading rifles were extensively tested during his tenure as Chief of Ordnance, but were not adopted because of problems with the cartridges of that time. In 1855, however, the Ordnance Board decided to convert existing stocks of smoothbore muzzleloading muskets to .58-cal. rifled muskets, and the days of the smoothbore were numbered. Finally, a modified 12-pounder Napoleon was tested and went into production. Craig was regarded as an experienced, conscientious, and dedicated officer, although he held strong views and was sometimes acerbic with his subordinates.

In the spring of 1861, at the age of 70 and after nearly 48 years of army service, Craig was relieved of his duties at the direction of the new Secretary of War, Simon Cameron, on the grounds that the Ordnance Department needed more vigorous leadership in light of the national emergency. Craig protested this action, but Cameron, who had consulted with General Winfield Scott, the army's commanding general, stood firm. Craig then took the matter up with President Lincoln, but the harried new Chief Executive chose not to intervene. Craig nevertheless remained on duty for another two years in an advisory capacity, and retired on June 1, 1863 after nearly fifty years of service.

On July 17, 1866, President Andrew Johnson nominated Craig for appointment to the grade of brevet brigadier general in the Regular Army of the United States for his service of over half a century to the army and ordnance department, to rank from March 13, 1865, and the United States Senate confirmed the appointment on July 26, 1866.

After his retirement from the army, Craig lived in Washington, D.C., where he died on December 7, 1869, aged 78. He is buried at Oak Hill Cemetery in Washington, D.C.

== Notes ==
Military offices
Preceded by Bvt. Brigadier General George Talcott	Chief of Ordnance of the United States Army; 1851–1861	Succeeded by Brigadier General James W. Ripley
