= James Vote Bomford =

American military officer (1811–1892)

James Vote "Voty" Bomford
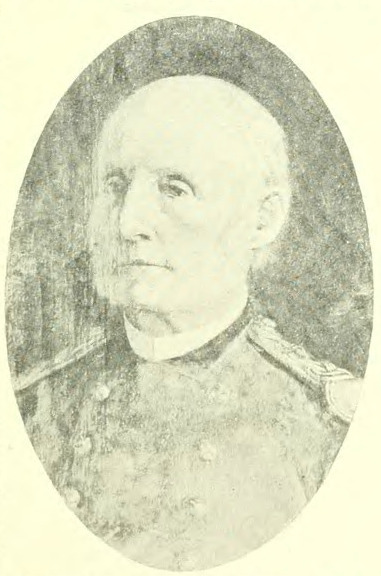
- Born: October 5, 1811; Governors Island, New York, U.S.
- Died: February 6, 1892 (aged 80); Elizabeth, New Jersey, U.S.
- Burial place: Evergreen Cemetery, Hillside, New Jersey
- Relatives: George Bomford (father); George N. Bomford (son)
- Military career
- Allegiance: United States of America; Union
- Branch: United States Army; Union Army
- Service years: 1832–1872
- Rank: Colonel; Brigadier general
- Commands: 8th Infantry Regiment
- Conflicts: Black Hawk War; Seminole War; Mexican–American War; Battle of Palo Alto; Battle of Resaca de la Palma; Battle of Monterey; Siege of Vera Cruz; Battle of Cerro Gordo; Battle of Contreras; Battle of Churubusco; Battle of Molino del Rey; Battle of Chapultepec; American Civil War; Battle of Perryville

James Vote "Voty" Bomford (October 5, 1811 – February 6, 1892) was a soldier in the United States military and a Union officer in the Civil War, and retired with the rank of Brigadier General. He graduated from Norwich University in 1828 and from West Point in 1832, and was a colonel in the 8th United States Infantry. Bomford was twice wounded in action at Perryville (brevetted colonel) and served in the Mexican–American War. His father was George Bomford, an inventor and military officer in the United States Army, who invented the Columbiad cannon. His son, also named George, was expelled but allowed to retire following his involvement in the Eggnog Riot at West Point. George did enter the military and retired as a captain.

== Family ==
James was born October 5, 1811, on Governors Island, New York, to George Bomford and Louisa Sophia Catton, daughter of noted English artist Charles P. Catton. On September 21, 1840, James Vote Bomford married Louise Victoire Clarke, daughter of future Brigadier General Newman S. Clarke. They had four children: George Newman Bomford, James Vote Bomford, Jr., Elizabeth Bernardine "Lilly" Bomford, and Fredrika Augusta Bomford.

== Military service ==
Voty Bomford served gallantly in the Black Hawk War and the Seminole War; was in all the major battles of the Mexican War, being the first man to plant the American flag on the citadel of the City of Mexico; and the Civil War. He was a Lieutenant-Colonel of the 8th Infantry when Fort Sumter was fired upon, and was held as a prisoner from April 1861 to May 1862 for failure to agree not to fight against the South. After release, he was assigned as executive officer of the Sixteenth Infantry under the command of Colonel (Brigadier-General Volunteers) Andrew Porter.

=== Military history ===
Bomford left West Point as a brevet second lieutenant of the 2d Infantry on July 1, 1832, and participated in the Black Hawk expedition. He was promoted to second lieutenant of the 2d Infantry on October 6, 1834, and participated in the Florida war from 1837 to 1838. He was stationed on the Northern frontier during Canada–US border disturbances. Promoted to first lieutenant (July 7, 1838), he became adjutant of the 8th Infantry at Sackett's Harbor, New York.

Still in the 8th Infantry, he was promoted to captain on March 4, 1845. In this capacity, he served in the war with Mexico and was engaged in the Battle of Palo Alto (May 8, 1846), Battle of Resaca de la Palma (May 9, 1846), Battle of Monterey (September 21–23, 1846), Siege of Vera Cruz (March 9‑29, 1847), Battle of Cerro Gordo (April 17–18, 1847), the capture of San Antonio and the resulting Battle of Churubusco (both on August 20, 1847), and the Battle of Molino del Rey (September 8, 1847). During this battle that included Bomford, General Worth ordered the 500 men of the U.S. 8th Infantry Regiment, commanded by Major George Wright, to initiate the advance against the army of General Santa Ana that had four thousand cavalry and a force of 14,000 men, against the 2800 men General Worth commanded. The battle of Molino del Rey, that was two miles (3 km) from Mexico City, preceded the Battle of Chapultepec (September 13, 1847). This is the battle that resulted in the capture of Mexico City, the placement of the American flag by Bomford, and the end of the war. He was brevetted major August 20, 1847, for gallant and meritorious conduct in the Battles of Contreras and Churubusco, and brevetted lieutenant colonel September 8, 1847, for gallant and meritorious conduct in the Battle of Molino del Rey.

Assigned to Fort Davis, Texas (1860‑61) and attached to the 6th Infantry, Bomford was promoted to major on October 17, 1860. When the Civil War started, he refused to agree not to fight against the South, and along with his regiment was taken prisoner. He was promoted to lieutenant colonel January 10, 1862, and assigned to the 16th Infantry (July–November 1862), and was the chief of staff to Major General Alexander M. McCook, a member of the famed "Fighting McCook" family of Ohio; in this capacity he fought at Perryville, Kentucky, and was wounded twice. Bomford was brevetted colonel on October 8, 1862, for gallant and meritorious services at the Battle of Perryville. He was assigned as acting assistant provost marshal general of the Western Division of Pennsylvania, May 30, 1863, to July 31, 1864; he was promoted to colonel and assigned to the 8th Infantry on May 18, 1864.

Bomford also served: in command of the District of North Carolina from September 20, 1866, to April, 1867; the regiment at Raleigh, North Carolina from April, 1867 to May 18, 1868; of the District of South Carolina from May 18, 1868, to October 23, 1870; of regiment at Davids' Island, New York Harbor, from November 5, 1870, to July 5, 1872; as Acting Inspector in the Department of the Platte, at Omaha, Nebraska from July 15 to October 1, 1872; in command of regiment at Fort D. A. Russell, Wyoming from October 5, 1872, to November 26, 1873; and on sick leave of absence from November 16, 1873, to June 8, 1874.

Eventually (in the 1890s), Rodman Guns (one cast 1872) were set up on the island that Bomford had commanded, 1870–72. Davids' Island, formerly called Rodman's Island, had once belonged to relatives along with nearby Rodman's Neck. Rodman's guns were improvements to the Columbiads that Bomford's father had invented. Under the law (July 17, 1862), and being over the age of 62, Brigadier General James Bomford was retired from duty June 8, 1872, after 43 distinguished years of service.

== Death ==
Bomford died January 6, 1892, at Elizabeth, New Jersey, at the age of 80, and was buried in Evergreen Cemetery, Hillside.

== See also ==
Center of Military History
