= List of Union Navy officers educated at the United States Naval Academy =

United States flag with 35 stars, as it appeared after the admission of West Virginia in 1863 until the end of the American Civil War in 1865

The United States Naval Academy (USNA) is an undergraduate college in Annapolis, Maryland, that educated and commissions officers for the United States Navy during the American Civil War. This list is drawn from alumni of the Military Academy who served as officer in the Union Navy (US Navy).

The American Civil War was disruptive to the Naval Academy. Southern sympathies ran high in Maryland. Although riots broke out, Maryland did not declare secession. The United States government was planning to move the school, when the sudden outbreak of hostilities forced a quick departure. Almost immediately the three upper classes were detached and ordered to sea, and the remaining elements of the academy were transported to Fort Adams in Newport, Rhode Island by the USS Constitution in April 1861, where the academy was set up in temporary facilities and opened in May. The Annapolis campus, meanwhile, was turned into a United States Army Hospital.

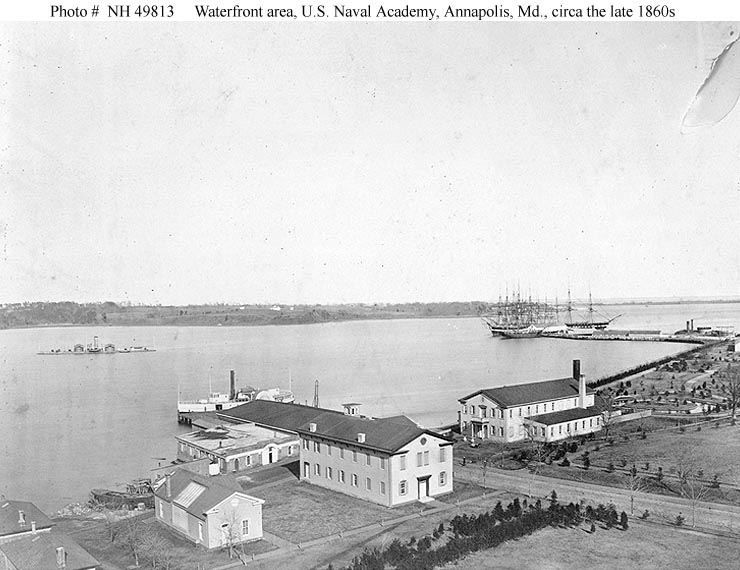
US Naval Academy waterfront in the late 1860s with the barrack/school ships USS Constitution and Santee tied up in the background. Other ships not identified.

Altogether, approximately 400 USNA officers served in the United States Navy during the Civil War, which is significantly higher than the 95 USNA graduates who served in the Confederate States Navy.

== List ==
Note: "Class year" refers to the class year of each alumnus, which usually is the same year the person graduated. However, in times of war, classes often graduate early.
'ex' after the class year indicates the alumnus is a non-graduating member of that class.

Name	Class year	Notability	References
Richmond Aulick	1846	Commander; graduated on July 11, 1846, making him the first official graduate of the Naval Academy; served in the Navy's Bureau of Ordnance during the war; retired January 27, 1865 due to failing health	
Homer C. Blake	1846	Lieutenant Commander; died in 1880, ten days after being promoted to the rank of commodore	
Samuel P. Carter	1846	Lieutenant Commander; Brevet Major General (1861-1866); retired in 1882 at the rank of rear admiral	
William Nelson	1846	Lieutenant Commander; Major General; mortally wounded by Maj. Gen. Jefferson C. Davis, a fellow Union officer, on 29 September 1862	
Thomas Phelps	1846	Commander; retired in 1885 at the rank of rear admiral	
Edward Simpson	1846	Commander; retired in 1886 at the rank of rear admiral	
Clark Henry Wells	1846	Lieutenant Commander; retired in 1884 at the rank of rear admiral	
Edward Barrett	1847	Lieutenant Commander; commander of the USS Catskill; captured the British blockade runner Deer as it fled Charleston and was grounded on 18 February 1865, which is recorded as the only time a monitor warship captured another vessel during the Civil War	
David McDermut	1847	Lieutenant Commander; commander of the USS Cayuga; killed in action 18 April 1863 while leading a shore party near Sabine Pass	
Joseph B. Smith	1847	Lieutenant; killed in action 8 August 1862 while acting commander of the USS Congress	
Samuel Rhoads Franklin	1848	Lieutenant Commander; retired in 1887 at the rank of rear admiral	
Stephen B. Luce	1848	Lieutenant Commander; retired in 1889 at the rank of rear admiral	
Francis Asbury Roe	1848	Lieutenant Commander; retired in 1885 at the rank of rear admiral	
John Henry Russell	1848	Lieutenant Commander; retired in 1886 at the rank of rear admiral	
Bancroft Gherardi	1852	Lieutenant Commander; retired in 1894 at the rank of rear admiral	
John G. Sproston	1852	Lieutenant; serving aboard the USS Seneca, he was killed 8 June 1862 while on a boat expedition to destroy a Confederate privateer in the St. Johns River in Florida	
Andrew E. K. Benham	1853	Lieutenant Commander; retired in 1894 at the rank of rear admiral	
Andrew Boyd Cummings	1853	Lieutenant Commander; mortally wounded in action March 14, 1863 while serving as executive officer aboard the USS Richmond which was attempting to pass the batteries at Port Hudson, Louisiana	
Charles W. Flusser	1853	Lieutenant Commander; killed in action 19 April 1864 during the Battle of Plymouth	
William Gwin	1853	Lieutenant commander; mortally wounded in action 27 December 1862 while commanding the USS Benton during the attack on Haine's Bluff, Mississippi	
Joseph S. Skerrett	1853	Lieutenant commander; retired in 1894 at the rank of rear admiral	
George Belknap	1854	Lieutenant commander; commanded the USS Canonicus during the Second Battle of Fort Fisher; retired in 1894 at the rank of rear admiral	
Joseph P. Fyffe	1854	Lieutenant commander; retired in 1894 at the rank of rear admiral	
George Brown	1855	Lieutenant Commander; retired in 1897 at the rank of rear admiral	
Edward Lea	1855	Lieutenant Commander; mortally wounded in action 1 January 1863 while serving as executive officer aboard the USRC Harriet Lane during the Battle of Galveston	
Charles A. Babcock	1856	Lieutenant commander; died 29 June 1876 as commander of the USS Canonicus	
Lester A. Beardslee	1856	Lieutenant commander; retired in 1898 at the rank of rear admiral	
Charles C. Carpenter	1856	Lieutenant commander; assigned to the Naval Academy staff 1863-1865; retired in 1896 at the rank of rear admiral, but recalled to service in 1898 due to the Spanish-American War; retired again in 1898	
Richard W. Meade	1856	Lieutenant commander; retired early in 1895 at the rank of rear admiral after a series of disagreements with the Navy Department	
Francis M. Ramsay	1856	Lieutenant commander; retired in 1897 at the rank of rear admiral	
John G. Walker	1856	Lieutenant commander; retired in 1897 at the rank of rear admiral	
George Dewey	1858	Lieutenant commander; American Civil War and Spanish–American War; Battle of New Orleans; won Battle of Manila Bay without loss of life due to combat among his own forces; the only person to hold the rank of Admiral of the Navy in the history of the US Navy	
Samuel D. Greene	1859	Lieutenant (executive officer); assumed command of the USS Monitor during the Battle of Hampton Roads when Lieutenant John Lorimer Worden was wounded and temporarily blinded	
Alexander Slidell MacKenzie	1859	Lieutenant Commander; killed in action at 13 June 1867 at Kenting, Taiwan, while leading a punitive expedition against the massacre of the entire crew of an American merchant bark Rover	
Alfred T. Mahan	1859	Lieutenant; retired at the rank of captain (1885) and awarded the rank of Rear Admiral in 1909; theorist of naval warfare as Sea Power; Mahan Hall at the Academy named in his honor	
Charles Swasey	1859	Lieutenant; killed in action 4 October 1862 while serving as executive officer aboard the USS Sciota during an engagement near Donaldsonville, Louisiana	
Winfield Scott Schley	1860	Lieutenant; instructor at the Academy (1867–69) and head of department of modern languages (1872–75); commander of the Flying Squadron of ships in the Spanish–American War; retired in 1901 at the rank of rear admiral	
William B. Cushing	1861	Commander; led the crew that successfully sank the CSS Albemarle in 1864	
William T. Sampson	1861	Rear Admiral; instructor at the Academy (1861–1864); Superintendent of the Academy (1886–1889); won the Battle of Santiago de Cuba during the Spanish–American War	
Samuel W. Preston	1862	Lieutenant; captured at the Second Battle of Fort Sumter in September 1863; killed in action 15 January 1865 at the Second Battle of Fort Fisher	
Colby Mitchell Chester	1863	Lieutenant commander; only US Navy officer to have actively served in the Civil War, Spanish-American War, and World War I; retired in 1909 and recalled to duty in 1917; remained on the active list as rear admiral until his death in 1932	
Charles Dwight Sigsbee	1863	Ensign; captain of USS Maine when it exploded in Havana harbor in 1898; commanded squadron which returned body of John Paul Jones from France to the Academy in 1905; retired in 1907 at the rank of rear admiral	
French E. Chadwick	1864	Acting ensign; as commander of the South Atlantic Squadron he played a major part in the Perdicaris incident of 1904 in Morocco; retired in 1906 at the rank of rear admiral	
Robley D. Evans	1864	Acting ensign; one of several acting midshipman who submitted resignations in 1861 believing his loyalties lay with the Confederacy, but withdrew his resignation; wounded in action four times at the Second Battle of Fort Fisher while leading a Marine landing party; on the retired list in 1866 at the rank of master; returned to the active list in 1867 at the rank of lieutenant commander; commanded the Navy's "Great White Fleet" on its world-wide cruise of 1907–1908; retired in 1908 at the rank of rear admiral	
Caspar F. Goodrich	1864	Ensign; as Commander of the Pacific Squadron, he directed the extinguishing of fires of ships in port during the 1906 San Francisco earthquake; retired in 1909 at the rank of rear admiral; recalled to active duty in World War I, he served as officer-in-charge of the Pay Officers' Material School at Princeton, New Jersey; retired again in 1919	
Yates Stirling	1864	Ensign; one of several acting midshipman who submitted resignations in 1861 believing his loyalties lay with the Confederacy, but withdrew his resignation four weeks later; father of Rear Admiral Yates Stirling Jr.; retired in 1905 at the rank of rear admiral	
Theodore Frelinghuysen Jewell	1865	Midshipman; retired in 1904 at the rank of rear admiral	

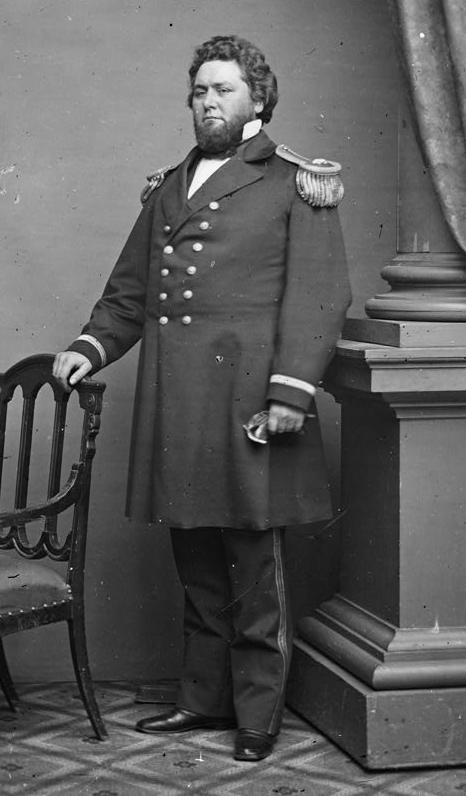
William "Bull" Nelson (1860)

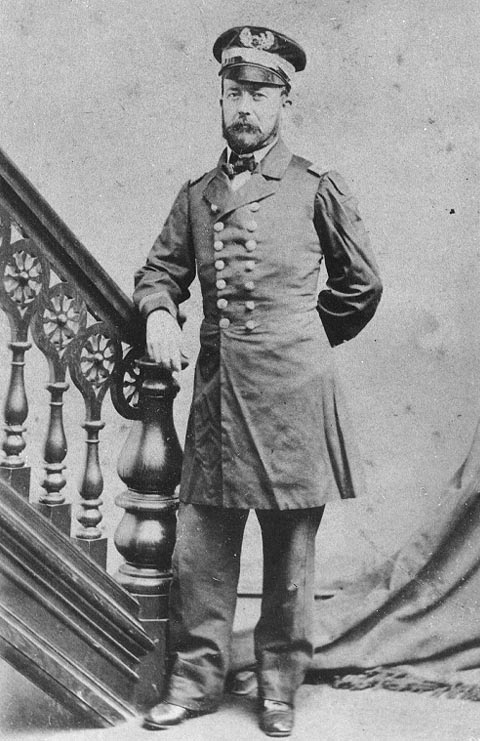
Joseph B. Smith (1861)

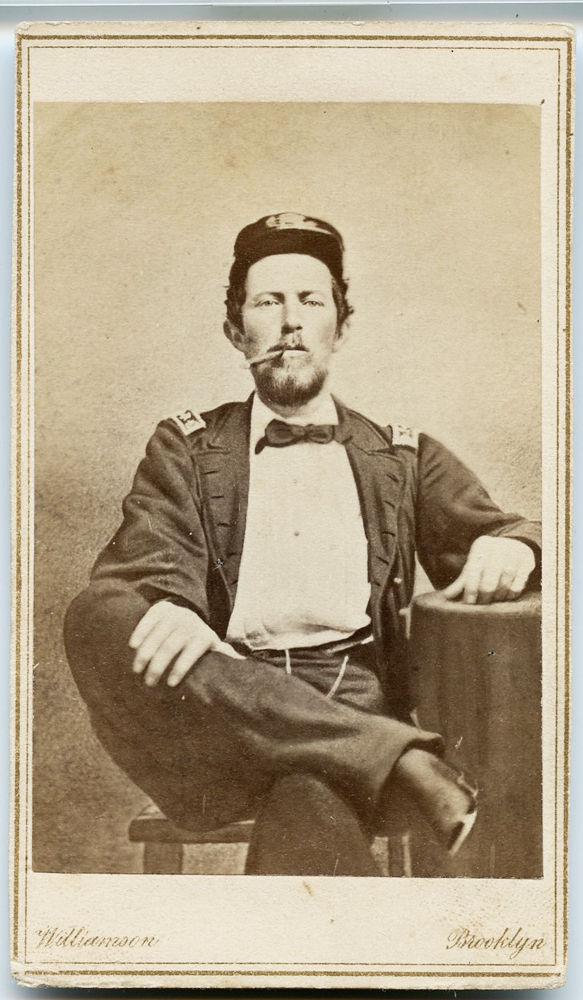
Charles W. Flusser (1864)

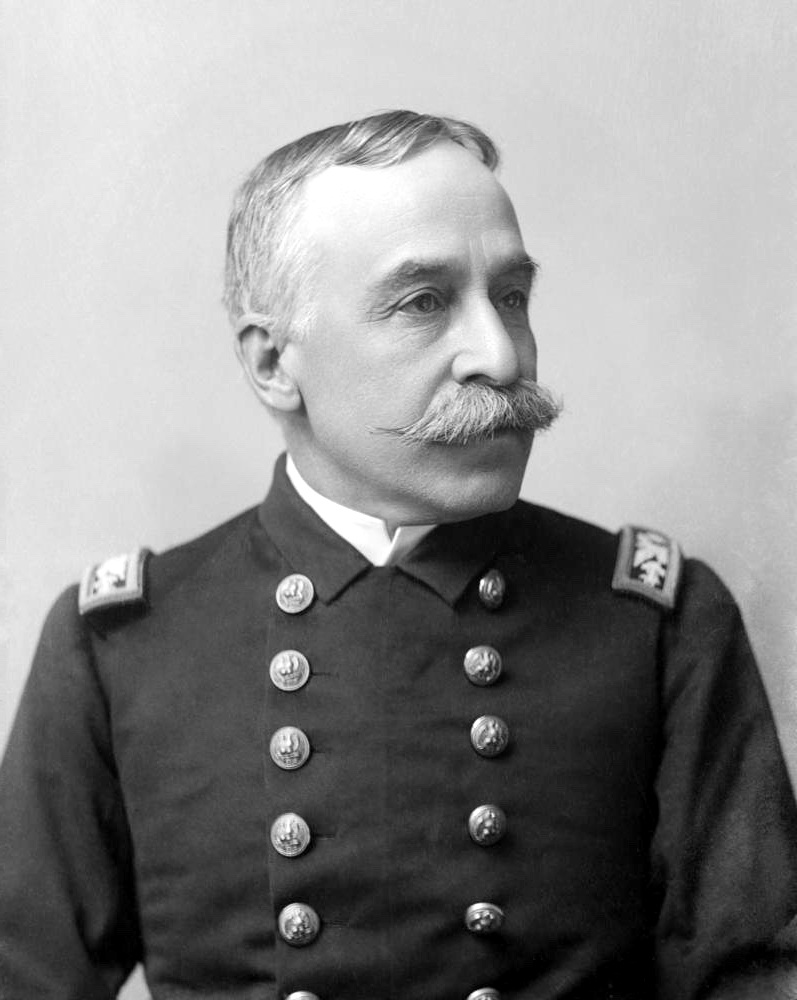
George Dewey (1899)

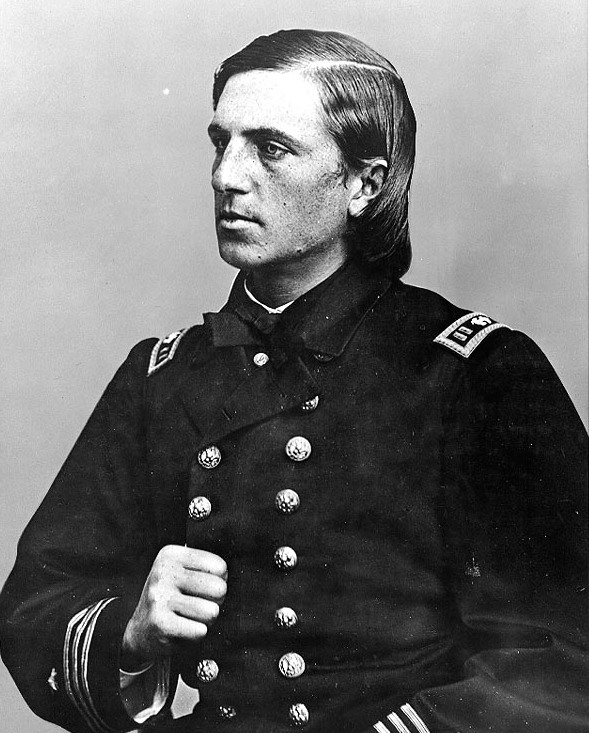
William B. Cushing

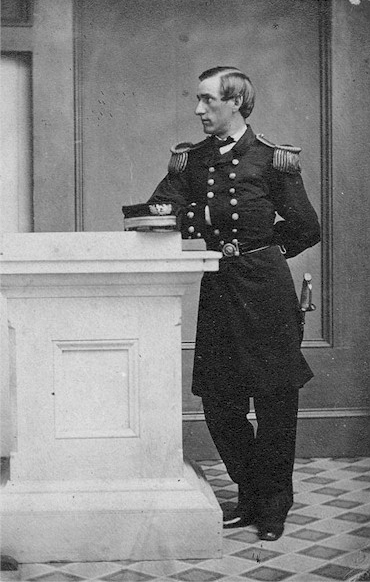
Samuel W. Preston (c. 1861-1862)

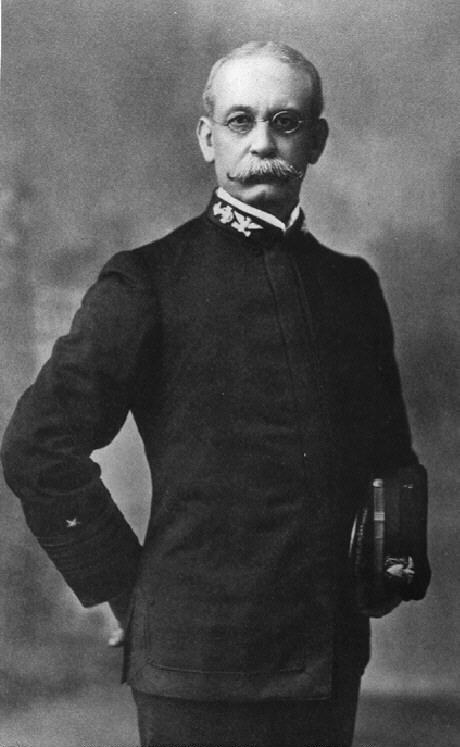
Charles Sigsbee

== See also ==
- List of Union Army officers educated at the United States Military Academy
- List of Confederate States Army officers educated at the United States Military Academy
