= George Talcott =

Army officer of USA

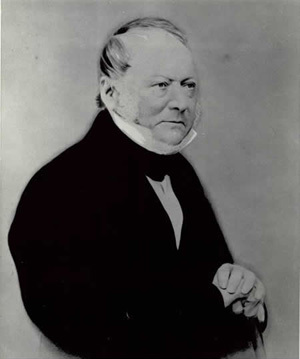
- Brevet Brigadier General George Talcott
- Military career
- Allegiance: United States of America
- Branch: United States Army
- Service years: 1813–1851
- Rank: Colonel; Bvt. Brigadier General
- Commands: Chief of Ordnance of the U.S. Army
- Conflicts: War of 1812; Mexican–American War

Brevet Brigadier General George Talcott (December 6, 1786 – April 25, 1862) was a career officer in the United States Army and served as the 3rd Chief of Ordnance of the U.S. Army.

== Biography ==
Talcott was born in Glastonbury, Connecticut on December 6, 1786. In 1813, he entered the Army as a Third Lieutenant of Infantry, and then within a matter of weeks, was promoted to the rank of Second Lieutenant. Initially, he was stationed on the islands in New York Harbor. By August of the same year, he was transferred to Ordnance duty and promoted to First Lieutenant. After declining an opportunity to be a Captain in the 41st Infantry Regiment, he accepted a Captaincy in the Ordnance Corps. He was placed in command of the Arsenal in New York City, and then spent some time in a similar capacity at the Arsenal in Albany, New York.

He reverted to the rank of First Lieutenant in May 1814 and was retained on Ordnance duty after the War of 1812 had concluded. His next assignment took him to Massachusetts where the new arsenal at Watertown was constructed under his supervision. Following command at Watertown, he was assigned command at Allegheny Arsenal, near Pittsburgh. In 1821, he transferred to the 2nd Artillery and remained detailed to ordnance duty. Talcott was given a brevet promotion to Major in August 1823 for ten years of faithful service in one grade.

In February 1824, while Talcott was in command of the Allegheny Arsenal, a convicted deserter escaped from the post stockade. Talcott had the man horsewhipped when he was recaptured, believing this action preferable to seeking a special order from higher headquarters suspending the prisoner's sentence for a period of time so that he might prepare for trial on the new charges. The prisoner escaped again but was not subsequently apprehended. Brought up on charges of having abused the prisoner, Talcott testified that he had ordered what he considered to be a justifiable whipping, and was adjudged not guilty of illegal and unmilitary conduct. Displeased with the manner in which the case had been handled, the Adjutant General directed that Talcott be retried. A new court martial confirmed the judgement of the 1823 panel, and the matter was dropped.

In September 1824, Talcott was appointed commanding officer of Watervliet Arsenal, a post he held until January 1832. He was promoted to Lieutenant Colonel in May 1832 and assigned as the Inspector of Arsenals and Armories for the Ordnance Corps. In April 1839, Talcott was made Acting Chief of the Ordnance Bureau. In 1842, he was appointed Assistant Chief of Ordnance, although he had already been performing most of the major administrative tasks for the department for three years. In his new post, he had effective day-to-day charge of all departmental activities. The expansion of Ordnance Department responsibilities which took place before and during the Mexican–American War, including the establishment of new ordnance depots and the elaboration of the department's field service operations, was largely accomplished under his direction.

On March 25, 1848, Talcott was promoted to Colonel and became the 3rd Chief of Ordnance, following the death of Colonel George Bomford. On March 3, 1849, Talcott was promoted to Brevet Brigadier General, with a date of rank from May 30, 1848, for his outstanding efforts in supporting the Army during the Mexican War. During his tenure, an elaborate study of European ordnance, made by Major Alfred Mordecai, probably the department's a best scientific authority, was completed in 1849, which resulted in the establishment of the first comprehensive and pragmatic field artillery system for the Army.

In the summer of 1851, General Talcott was relieved of his duties and court-martialed at the direction of Secretary of War Charles Conrad following a dispute over the awarding of munitions contracts to a Southern contractor. Secretary Conrad, in office but a short time, had chosen to review all procurement arrangements with civilian contractors. In spite of a long-standing departmental policy distinguishing between open purchases and formal contracts, General Talcott had been authorized to purchase ordnance materiel at his discretion for more than a decade. In addition, differences between Secretary Conrad and General Talcott over personnel assignments and the injudicious actions of Brevet Colonel Benjamin Huger, who had proceeded with the munitions contract without General Talcott's full knowledge or approval combined to bring about General Talcott's dismissal from the Army. Colonel Huger was never brought up on charges although he was admonished by President Fillmore.

While a good many of those familiar with the case felt that the facts did not warrant so severe a verdict and attested to General Talcott's demonstrated honesty and probity in his career, the sentence was not reversed. Subsequent efforts by several members of the U.S. Senate either to have that body officially inquire into the circumstances of General Talcott's case or to provide some financial relief for him in his retirement were to no avail. General Talcott died on April 25, 1862, at the age of 75.

Military offices
Preceded by Colonel George Bomford	Chief of Ordnance of the United States Army; 1848–1851	Succeeded by Colonel Henry K. Craig
