= Isaac Craig =

Isaac Craig (1742–1826) was a Pittsburgh businessman and politician in the early days of western Pennsylvania settlement.

== Life ==
Craig was born in County Down in Ireland of Protestant parents, and was fortunate enough to be apprenticed as a carpenter. After completing his apprenticeship, he became a journeyman carpenter and from his earnings was able to pay for his passage to Philadelphia. He prospered as a carpenter in Philadelphia, and at a young age became a master carpenter and a member of the Carpenters Company.

During the American Revolution, he served first in the navy and later in the infantry. He was with General George Washington at the crossing of the Delaware River and in the Battle of Trenton. In 1782, he was promoted to the rank of major.

He purchased land in western Pennsylvania while still in Philadelphia, and eventually went to live in Pittsburgh. In 1785, Craig married Amelia Neville in Pittsburgh, daughter of Virginian General John Neville. She survived him by more than two decades. The couple's thirteen children, ten of whom survived past infancy, included newspaper editor Neville B. Craig and Army officer Henry Knox Craig. Craig was elected to the American Philosophical Society in 1787.

== Chief Burgess ==
Craig was elected and served as Chief Burgess of Borough of Pittsburgh as a Federalist from 1802 to 1803. He died in 1826 in Montour, Pennsylvania.

== See also ==
- List of mayors of Pittsburgh
