= George Bomford =

American military officer, inventor, and designer

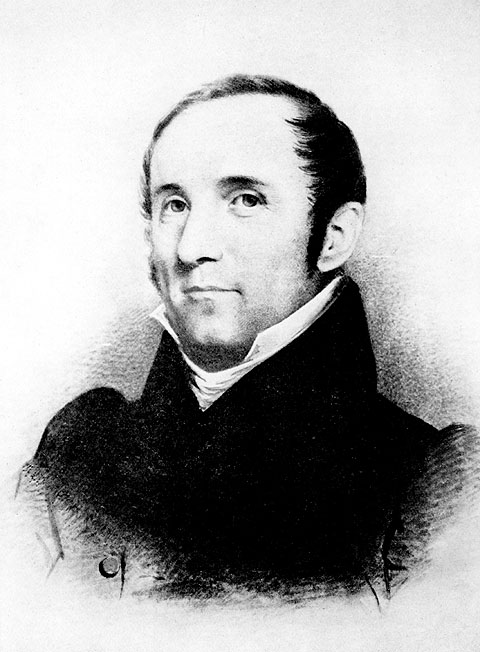
- George Bomford, designer, inventor, and Inspector of Arsenals, Ordnance, Arms and Munitions of War from 1842 to 1845 (Cullum's Register).
- Born: 1780; Long Island, New York, U.S.
- Died: March 25, 1848 (aged 67–68); Boston, Massachusetts, U.S.
- Burial place: Rock Creek Cemetery, Washington, D.C., U.S.
- Relatives: James Vote (Voty Bomford) (son); George N. Bomford (grandson)
- Military career
- Allegiance: United States
- Branch: United States Army
- Service years: 1805–1848
- Rank: Colonel
- Commands: 2nd Chief of Ordnance (1832–1848)
- Conflicts: War of 1812

George Bomford (1780 – March 25, 1848) was a military officer in the United States Army and an inventor and designer of weapons and defensive installations. He served as the second Chief of Ordnance for the U.S. Army Ordnance Corps.

== Early life and education ==
George Bomford was born on Long Island, New York in 1780 during the American Revolutionary War, the son of a British officer, Thomas Bomford of the 60th Royal Artillery, and his wife. His birth records do not indicate an exact date of birth nor the name of his father. Bomford later told his son James the information, who reported it in records at Norwich University.

By a chance meeting, Bomford befriended the first graduate of West Point Joseph Gardner Swift. Swift sought and received a "Cadet's Warrant" from General Henry Dearborn for his friend, and Bomford was appointed to West Point from the state of New York on 23 October 1804, despite the circumstances of his birth.

== Career ==
After graduating from United States Military Academy, West Point in 1805, as a lieutenant in the Corps of Engineers, he served as assistant engineer in the defenses of New York Harbor under West Point superintendent and Chief of Engineers, Jonathan Williams (engineer) until 1808. From 1808 to 1810, Bomford served in the defenses of Chesapeake Bay. From 1810 to 1812 he served as the superintendent engineer of works on Governors Island in the construction of Castle Williams.

At the start of the war of 1812–1815, Bomford was a staff major in the ordnance department and was appointed to the post of assistant commissary general of ordnance on 18 June 1812. On 6 July 1812 he was attached to the Corps of Engineers.

After the war, on 9 February 1815 Bomford was promoted to lieutenant colonel. As an engineer, he and Joseph Gardner Swift were called upon to help rebuild the U.S. Capitol in Washington, D.C., an effort that lasted from 1815 until 1819.

Bomford was attached to the artillery when the army was reorganized in 1821 and the Ordnance Department and Artillery Departments were merged in the interest of economy. In 1832, the Ordnance Department was re-established as the United States Army Ordnance Corps. At that time he was promoted to full colonel and appointed as the 2nd Chief of Ordnance on 30 May 1832.

When General Tadeusz Kościuszko died in 1817, despite writing four wills, two executors (including Thomas Jefferson) failed to act. By time the U.S. Supreme Court declared in 1852 that the general died intestate and gave his money to his heirs, the value of his estate had decreased substantially; this was attributed by a case attorney to Colonel George Bomford's use of the estate for his own purposes.

Bomford was elected a Fellow of the American Academy of Arts and Sciences in 1841. In 1842 he became inspector of arsenals, ordnance, arms, and munitions of war. He held both positions until his death in 1848.

=== Columbiad gun ===
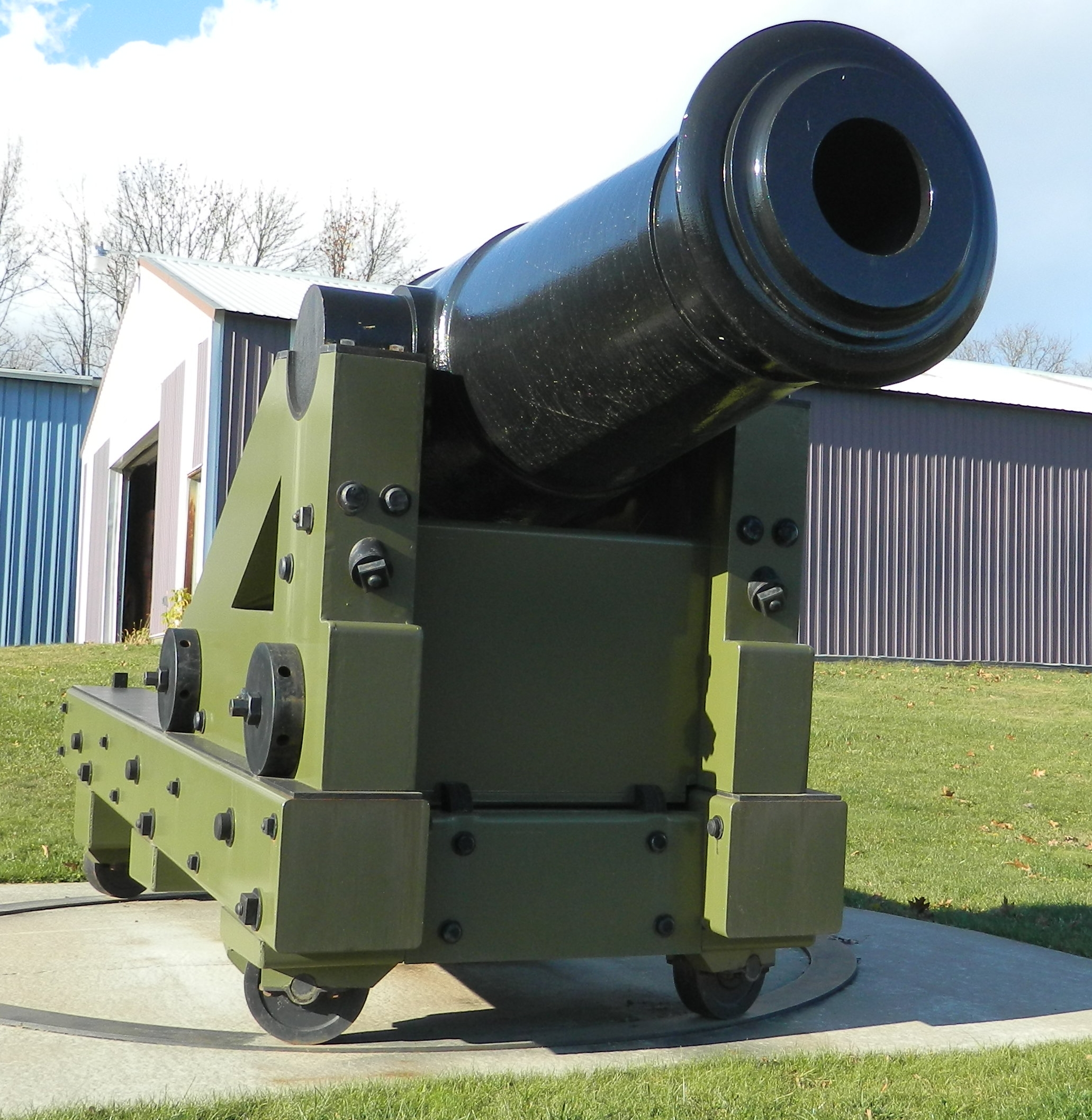

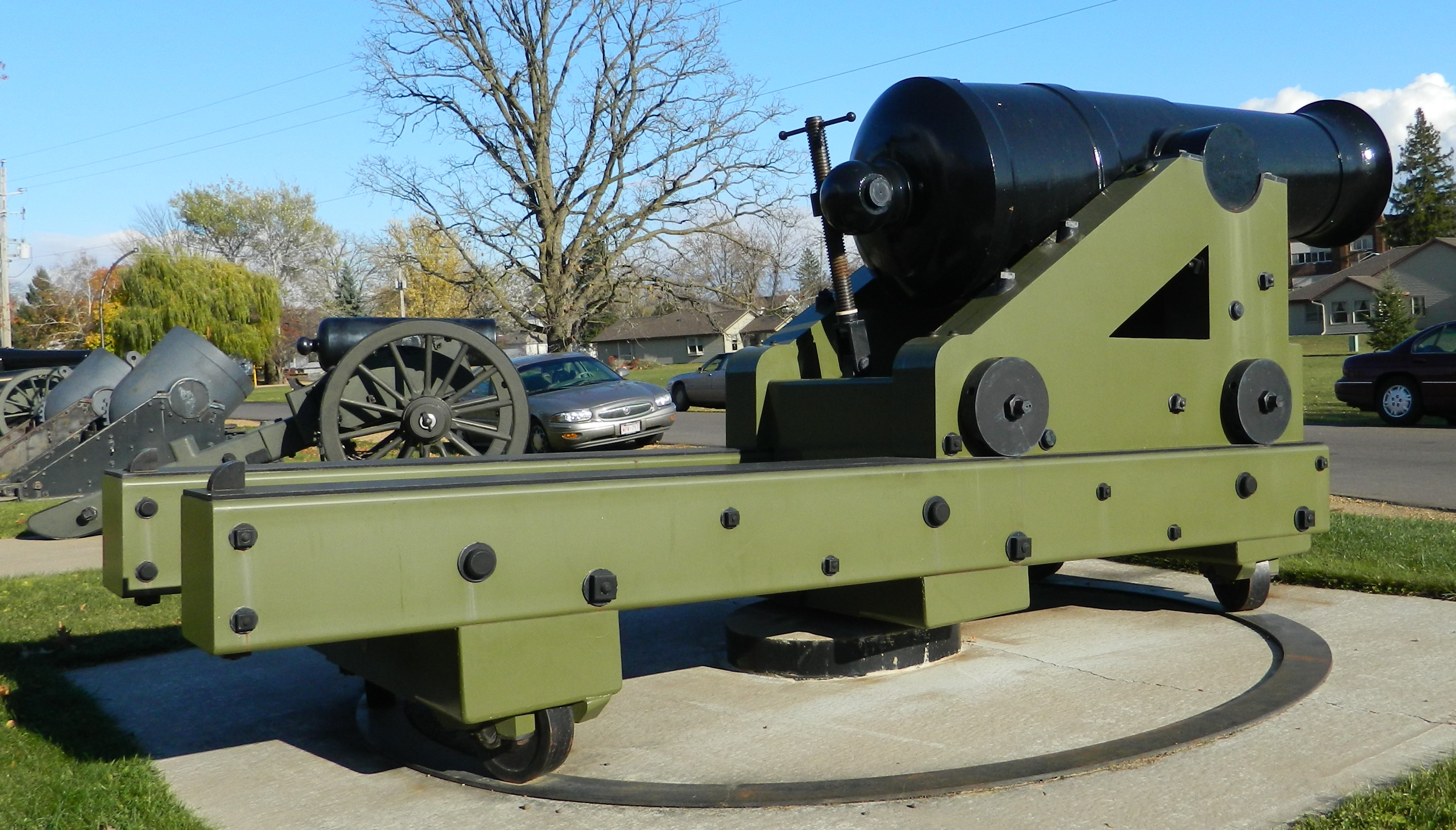
50-pounder Model 1811 Columbiad and center pivot mounting designed by George Bomford as an experimental coastal defense gun, photographed in Clear Lake, Wisconsin. This gun was built in 1811.

In 1811, Bomford developed the first heavy coastal defense howitzers that would come to be referred to as Columbiads.

The heavy coastal defense howitzers designed by Bomford combined attributes of the gun, and the mortar, to produce a long-range, high-powered, anti-ship weapon. The first prototype guns of this type, Model 1811 produced by the Alger Foundry, came to be referred to as Columbiads after the epic poem by, and in honor of, Joel Barlow, poet and diplomat married to Bomford's wife's sister. Bomford and his wife Clara lived on the estate of Joel Barlow, known as "Kalorama". The army stationed 8-inch and 10-inch Columbiads Model 1844 around the country as a part of the Third System of Defense. Bomford's design was improved by the Navy's Dahlgren Gun, but was superseded by the Rodman gun (Thomas Jackson Rodman) of the Civil War.

It was considered an improved Columbiad, especially the later models with rifled barrels. The Rodman Gun was considered more reliable than the larger sized Parrott rifles (which were eventually pulled from inventory) or the early Columbiads. Columbiads continued in operation until after the Spanish–American War when they were rendered obsolete by the breech-loading rifled cannon.

== Marriage and family ==
Shortly after graduating West Point, Bomford married Louisa Sophia Catton, daughter of the noted English artist Charles P. Catton. They had three children: George Catton Bomford, James Vote (or Votey) Bomford, and Louisa Sophia Bomford.

George Catton was born 17 December 1807. While a cadet at West Point, he was found guilty on four charges in a court martial on 2 March 1827, resulting from the Eggnog Riot of December 25, 1826. Although expelled from the Academy, he was allowed to retire from the Army.

James was born 5 October 1811 on Governors Island in New York Harbor. He graduated from Norwich University in Vermont in 1828. He gained an appointment at West Point, where he graduated in 1832. He rose to a colonel in the 8th United States infantry, and was promoted to a brevet brigadier general in the American Civil War. During this time, he was held as a prisoner by the Confederates from April 1861 to May 1862. After a career in the Army, he died January 6, 1892, at Elizabeth, New Jersey at the age of 80 and was buried at Evergreen Cemetery, Hillside, New Jersey.

James' son, George N. Bomford, also had a military career. He was a Lieutenant Colonel of the 42nd New York Infantry, 3rd Brigade of the Second Division, under the command of Brigadier General Oliver O. Howard, and fought at the Battle of Fredericksburg during the Civil War. He died 5 September 1897.

Louisa Sophia Bomford was born on 3 May 1813 in Albany, New York. She died 19 April 1864 in Newport, Rhode Island.

George Bomford married a second time 20 April 1816 to Clarissa "Clara" Baldwin (died 10 December 1856) and they had three children. They were Ruth Theodora: born 1 January 1818, married John (Jott) Stone Paine, and died 28 November 1895; Henry Baldwin: born 1823 or 1824, died 9 September 1845; and George Erving Bomford, born 31 March 1829, became a surgeon and married, and died 1864 during the Civil War.

== Death ==
George Bomford died in Boston, Massachusetts 25 March 1848 while on army business and was buried in a tomb in the family mausoleum on the "Kalorama estate" in Washington, D.C. In 1892, due to construction of Massachusetts Avenue on the site of the estate, the remains of George Bomford, his wife Clara, and son Henry Baldwin Bomford, were moved to Rock Creek Cemetery and placed under one headstone.

== Notes ==
- National Genealogical Society Quarterly (NGSQ) publication 86; December 1998. Published online;

Military offices
Preceded by Colonel Decius Wadsworth	Chief of Ordnance of the United States Army; 1832 - 1848	Succeeded by Colonel George Talcott
