= List of Union Army officers educated at the United States Military Academy =

United States flag with 35 stars, as it appeared after the admission of West Virginia in 1863 until the end of the American Civil War in 1865

The United States Military Academy (USMA) is an undergraduate college in West Point, New York, that educates and commissions officers for the United States Army during the American Civil War. This list is drawn from alumni of the Military Academy who served as general officers in the Union Army (US Army). This includes William Tecumseh Sherman (class of 1840), Abner Doubleday (class of 1842), Ulysses S. Grant (class of 1843), George Crook (class of 1852), Philip Sheridan (class of 1853). This also includes six recipients of the Medal of Honor: Rufus Saxton (class of 1849), Eugene Asa Carr (class of 1850), John Schofield (class of 1853), Oliver O. Howard (class of 1854), Alexander S. Webb (class of 1855), and Adelbert Ames (class of 1861).

== List ==
Note: "Class year" refers to the class year of each alumnus, which usually is the same year the person graduated. However, in times of war, classes often graduate early.
'ex' after the class year indicates the alumnus is a non-graduating member of that class.

Name	Class year	Notability	References
Joseph Gilbert Totten	1805	Major General; War of 1812, Mexican–American War; military and lighthouse engineer; Chief of Engineers (1838–1864)	
Gustavus Loomis	1811	Brigadier General; Black Hawk War, Third Seminole War; Superintendent of general recruiting during the American Civil War	
Ethan A. Hitchcock	1817	Major General; grandson of Ethan Allen; commandant of cadets at the Academy (1829–1833); Seminole Wars, Mexican–American War; held several assignments in the War Department during the American Civil War; writer on alchemy and Jungian psychology; collector of flute music	
Richard Delafield	1818	Major General; 7th, 11th, and 13th Superintendent of the Academy (1838–1845), (1856–1861), (1861); in charge of New York Harbor defenses (1861–64); Chief of Engineers (1864–1866)	
John Joseph Abercrombie	1822	Brigadier General; Black Hawk War, Seminole Wars, Mexican–American War; colonel 7th U.S. Infantry, Battle of Falling Waters, commander 2nd Brigade, I Corps, Army of the Potomac, Peninsula Campaign, wounded at the Battle of Seven Pines, Battle of Malvern Hill, assigned to defenses of Washington, D.C., and various supply depots during the Overland Campaign, retired from active duty June 12, 1865.	
David Hunter	1822	Major General; Second Seminole War, Mexican–American War; First Battle of Bull Run, commander of the Union Army of the Shenandoah; emancipated slaves in three states, which was rescinded, prior to the Emancipation Proclamation, president of the military commission trying the conspirators involved with the assassination of President Lincoln.	
Joseph K. Mansfield	1822	Major General; Mexican–American War; civil engineer; mortally wounded at the Battle of Antietam; Fort Mansfield, a coastal artillery installation in Westerly, Rhode Island, named in his honor	
George A. McCall	1822	Brigadier General; Second Seminole War, Mexican–American War; wounded and captured at Battle of Glendale, later released in a prisoner exchange	
George Wright	1822	Brigadier General; Second Seminole War, Yakima War, Mexican–American War; commander of the Department of the Pacific during the Civil War	
George S. Greene	1823	Brigadier General; second cousin of General Nathanael Greene of the American Revolutionary War; railroad and aqueduct engineer, founder of American Society of Civil Engineers and Architects; defender of Culp's Hill during the Battle of Gettysburg	
Lorenzo Thomas	1823	Major General; Seminole Wars, Mexican–American War; Adjutant General of the U.S. Army; U.S. Secretary of War; Camp Thomas was named for him	
Robert Anderson	1825	Major General; Black Hawk War, Second Seminole War, Mexican–American War; commander of Fort Sumter at the start of the war	
Charles Ferguson Smith	1825	Major General; Mexican–American War; Battle of Fort Donelson, injured his leg in a rowing accident and subsequently died of infection in 1862	
Silas Casey	1826	Major General; Second Seminole War, Mexican–American War, Pig War; Battle of Seven Pines; father of Brigadier General Thomas Lincoln Casey, Jr.	
Samuel P. Heintzelman	1826	Major General; Second Seminole War, Mexican–American War, Cortina Troubles; First Battle of Bull Run, Peninsula Campaign, Second Battle of Bull Run; commander of III Corps and XXII Corps of the Army of the Potomac	
Napoleon Bonaparte Buford	1827	Major General; Battle of Belmont, Battle of Island Number Ten, Siege of Corinth; brother of Major General John Buford; cousin of Confederate States Brigadier General Abraham Buford II	
Philip St. George Cooke	1827	Major General; Black Hawk War, Mexican–American War; Battle of Yorktown, Battle of Williamsburg, Battle of Gaines's Mill, Battle of White Oak Swamp; father of Confederate States Brigadier General John Rogers Cooke; father-in-law of Confederate States Major General J. E. B. Stuart	
James Barnes	1829	Major General; railroad engineer; Battle of Shepherdstown, Battle of Fredericksburg, Battle of Gettysburg	
Ormsby M. Mitchel	1829	Major General; Great Locomotive Chase; commander of X Corps; Mitchell, Indiana, and Fort Mitchell, Kentucky, are named for him	
Robert C. Buchanan	1830	Brigadier General; Black Hawk War, Second Seminole War, Mexican–American War; Battle of Yorktown, Battle of Gaines's Mill, Battle of Glendale, Battle of Malvern Hill, Second Battle of Bull Run, Battle of Fredericksburg; brigade commander in the Army of the Potomac and V Corps; commander of the 1st Infantry Regiment and Fort Porter	
Jacob Ammen	1831	Brigadier General; Battle of Cheat Mountain, Battle of Shiloh, Siege of Corinth, First Battle of Saltville; brigade commander in the Army of the Ohio and division commander in the XXII Corps; brother of Navy Rear Admiral Daniel Ammen	
Samuel Ryan Curtis	1831	Major General; Mexican–American War; Battle of Pea Ridge, Battle of Westport; commander of the Army of the Southwest and Army of the Border; U.S. Representative from Iowa	
Andrew A. Humphreys	1831	Major General; Seminole Wars; Peninsula Campaign, Battle of Antietam, Battle of Fredericksburg, Battle of Chancellorsville, Battle of Gettysburg, Bristoe Campaign, Battle of Mine Run, Overland Campaign, Siege of Petersburg, Battle of Sailor's Creek; division commander in the III Corps; commander of the V Corps and II Corps; Chief of Engineers (1866–1875)	
Horatio P. Van Cleve	1831	Major General; Battle of Mill Springs, Siege of Corinth, Battle of Perryville, Battle of Stones River, Battle of Chickamauga	
Erasmus D. Keyes	1832	Major General; Puget Sound War, Spokane – Coeur d'Alene – Paloos War, Battle of Four Lakes; commander of the IV Corps of the Army of the Potomac during the first half of the American Civil War, First Battle of Bull Run, Peninsula Campaign, Battle of Yorktown, Battle of Seven Pines, Battle of Malvern Hill, Gettysburg campaign, resigned in May 1864 after being relieved of command due to retreating in combat	
Randolph B. Marcy	1832	Brigadier General; Inspector General of the U.S. Army; father-in-law of New Jersey Governor and Major General George B. McClellan	
James Vote Bomford	1832	Brigadier General; Chief of Ordnance (1832–1848)	
Benjamin Alvord	1833	Brigadier General; Second Seminole War, Mexican–American War; commander of the District of Oregon; father of Brigadier General Benjamin Alvord, Jr.; the Alvord Desert is named after him	
Rufus King	1833	Brigadier General; division commander in the Iron Brigade; U.S. Minister to the Papal States; grandson of U.S. Senator Rufus King; father of Medal of Honor recipient Rufus King, Jr. and Brigadier General Charles King	
Thomas A. Morris	1834	Brigadier General, Indiana State Volunteers	
Curran Pope	1834	Colonel; commanding officer of the 15th Kentucky Infantry; wounded in action at the Battle of Perryville after assuming command of the 17th Brigade, Third Division, I Corps, Army of the Ohio; died November 6, 1862, of typhoid fever while recovering from his wound	
Morris S. Miller	1834	Brevet Brigadier General; Seminole Wars; Mexican–American War; Aroostook War; Quartermaster of Washington, D.C., 1861–1864; Board for the Examination of Quartermasters in the Department of Arkansas and the Department of the Gulf, 1864–1865	
Gabriel René Paul	1834	Brigadier General; Seminole Wars; Mexican–American War; brigade commander, I Corps, Army of the Potomac; Battle of Chancellorsville; seriously wounded and blinded in action on the first day at the Battle of Gettysburg	
Cary H. Fry	1834	Brevet Lieutenant Colonel; physician; Mexican–American War; Paymaster, Washington, D.C., 1861–1863; Acting Paymaster-General, 1862; Chief Paymaster, District of Washington, D.C., 1863; Paymaster, San Francisco, 1863–1867	
Seneca G. Simmons	1834	Colonel; Seminole Wars; commanding officer, 34th Pennsylvania Volunteer Infantry [5th Pennsylvania Reserves]; killed in action at the Battle of Glendale while in command of 1st Brigade, Third Division, V Corps, Army of the Potomac	
Joseph L. Coburn	1834	Captain; civilian employee of the Subsistence Department, Perryville, Maryland, 1861–1862; civilian employee Quartermaster Department, Chicago, Illinois, 1863–1864; reappointed captain in the U.S. Volunteers, 1864, serving at Chicago until 1865	
Richard S. Smith	1834	Major; served as a teacher of drawing at the U.S. Military Academy, 1840–1855; major, 12th U.S. Infantry; commanded the regiment at the Battle of Chancellorsville; resigned May 30, 1863, to accept appointment as president of Girard College, Philadelphia	
William Scott Ketchum	1834	Brevet Major General; Seminole Wars; Bleeding Kansas; served in various assignments including acting inspector general, Department of the Missouri and Department of the Mississippi, organizing Pennsylvania volunteers, Paymaster Department, and Quartermaster Department	
Alexander Montgomery	1834	Major; Seminole Wars; Quartermaster at Indianapolis, 1861–1862; Quartermaster at Pittsburgh, 1862–1863; Mustering Out officer at Cleveland and Cincinnati, 1864–1865	
Joseph Horace Eaton	1835	Brigadier General; Mexican–American War; artist; assistant Union Army paymaster during the American Civil War	
Herman Haupt	1835	Brigadier General; Northern Virginia Campaign, Maryland Campaign, Gettysburg campaign; commander of United States Military Railroad	
John H. Martindale	1835	Major General; Battle of Malvern Hill, Bermuda Hundred Campaign, Battle of Cold Harbor, Siege of Petersburg; Military Governor of Washington, D.C.; Attorney General of New York; son of U.S. Representative Henry C. Martindale	
George Meade	1835	Major General; civil and lighthouse engineer; Second Seminole War, Mexican–American War; Battle of Antietam, Battle of Fredericksburg, Battle of Chancellorsville, Appomattox Campaign, defeated Robert E. Lee at the Battle of Gettysburg, commander Army of the Potomac (1863–1865); Fort George G. Meade in Maryland, home of the National Security Agency named in his honor	
Henry Morris Naglee	1835	Brigadier General; Mexican–American War; Battle of Seven Pines; brigade commander in the Army of the Potomac; commander of the VII Corps; Naglee Park in San Jose, California, is named for him	
Marsena R. Patrick	1835	Major General; Seminole Wars, Mexican–American War; Battle of South Mountain, Battle of Antietam, Battle of Gettysburg; brigade commander in the I Corps; Military Governor of Fredericksburg, Virginia	
Benjamin S. Roberts	1835	Major General; Mexican–American War, Indian Wars; Battle of Valverde, Battle of Cedar Mountain, Second Battle of Rappahannock Station, Second Battle of Bull Run; division commander in the VIII Corps and XIX Corps	
Robert Allen	1836	Brigadier General; Mexican–American War; Vicksburg Campaign, Atlanta campaign	
Montgomery C. Meigs	1836	Major General; Battle of Fredericksburg; Quartermaster General of the U.S. Army	
John W. Phelps	1836	Brigadier General; Seminole Wars, Mexican–American War, Utah War; Battle of Forts Jackson and St. Philip; commander of the 1st Vermont Infantry; candidate for President of the United States	
Daniel Phineas Woodbury	1836	Brigadier General; First Battle of Bull Run, Peninsula Campaign, Northern Virginia Campaign, Battle of Antietam, Battle of Fredericksburg; superintended the construction of Fort Kearny and Fort Laramie	
Alexander Brydie Dyer	1837	Major General; Seminole Wars, Mexican–American War; commander of the Springfield Armory	
William H. French	1837	Major General; Second Seminole War, Mexican–American War; brigade commander at Battle of Yorktown, Battle of Seven Pines, Battle of Oak Grove, Battle of Gaines's Mill, Battle of Garnett's & Golding's Farm, Battle of Savage's Station, Battle of Glendale, Battle of Malvern Hill, division commander in Northern Virginia Campaign, Battle of Antietam, Battle of Fredericksburg, Battle of Chancellorsville, Gettysburg campaign, Battle of Mine Run; commander of VIII Corps and III Corps; commander of Fort McDowell and Fort McHenry	
Joseph Hooker	1837	Major General; Seminole Wars, Mexican–American War; Battle of Williamsburg, Seven Days Battles, Battle of South Mountain, Battle of Antietam, Battle of Fredericksburg, Battle of Chancellorsville, Gettysburg campaign, Battle of Lookout Mountain, Chattanooga campaign, Atlanta campaign; commander of I Corps, V Corps, and XX Corps; commander of the Army of the Potomac; brother-in-law of U.S. Representative William S. Groesbeck	
John Sedgwick	1837	Major General; Seminole Wars, Mexican–American War, Utah War, Indian Wars; Battle of Yorktown, Battle of Seven Pines, wounded at the Battle of Glendale and Battle of Antietam, Battle of Fredericksburg, Battle of Chancellorsville, Battle of Salem Church, Battle of Gettysburg, Battle of the Wilderness, killed at the Battle of Spotsylvania Court House; division commander in the Army of the Potomac; commander of the II Corps, IX Corps, and VI Corps	
John Blair Smith Todd	1837	Brigadier General; Seminole Wars, Mexican–American War; U.S. Congressional Delegate from the Dakota Territory; cousin by marriage of U.S. President Abraham Lincoln and Confederate States Brigadier General Benjamin Hardin Helm; Todd County, South Dakota, and Todd County, Minnesota, are named for him	
Buckner Board	1838	Colonel; Seminole Wars; colonel 2nd Kentucky Cavalry, resigned December 25, 1862	
Robert S. Granger	1838	Brigadier General; Seminole Wars, Mexican–American War; commander of Districts of Nashville, Middle Tennessee, and Northern Alabama	
Irvin McDowell	1838	Major General; Mexican–American War; defeated at First Battle of Bull Run	
Andrew Jackson Smith	1838	Major General; Mexican–American War, Indian Wars; Vicksburg Campaign, Red River Campaign, Battle of Tupelo, Battle of Nashville	
Edward Canby	1839	Major General; Second Seminole War, Mexican–American War, Utah War, Navajo War of 1860, Modoc War; Battle of Valverde, Battle of Glorieta Pass, Battle of Peralta, Battle of Spanish Fort, Battle of Fort Blakeley; commander of Fort Defiance; commander of the Second Military District and Fifth Military District; Canby, Oregon, Canby, Minnesota, and Canby, California, are named for him	
Henry Wager Halleck	1839	Major General; Mexican–American War; Battle of Shiloh, Siege of Corinth; General-in-Chief of the Union Army; Army Chief of Staff; grandson-in-law of U.S. Secretary of the Treasury Alexander Hamilton; brother-in-law of Major General Schuyler Hamilton	
Henry Jackson Hunt	1839	Major General; Mexican–American War, Utah War; First Battle of Bull Run, Battle of Malvern Hill, Battle of Antietam, Battle of Fredericksburg, Battle of Gettysburg, Siege of Petersburg	
Edward Ord	1839	Major General; Indian Wars; Battle of Dranesville, Battle of Hatchie's Bridge, Siege of Vicksburg, Third Battle of Petersburg; commander of the XIII Corps; commander of the Army of the James; commander of the Fourth Military District	
Isaac Stevens	1839	Major General; Mexican–American War; Battle of Fort Pulaski, Battle of James Island, Second Battle of Bull Run, killed at the Battle of Chantilly; U.S. Congressional Delegate from the Washington Territory; father of Brigadier General and Medal of Honor recipient Hazard Stevens; Fort Stevens in Washington, D.C., and Fort Stevens in Oregon were named for him	
George W. Getty	1840	Major General; Mexican–American War, Seminole Wars; Peninsula Campaign, Battle of South Mountain, Battle of Antietam, Battle of Fredericksburg, Gettysburg campaign, wounded at the Battle of the Wilderness, Siege of Petersburg, Valley Campaigns of 1864; division commander in the Army of the Potomac	
William Hays	1840	Brigadier General; Mexican–American War, Seminole Wars; Battle of Seven Pines, Battle of Antietam, Battle of Fredericksburg, wounded and taken prisoner at the Battle of Chancellorsville, Battle of Gettysburg; brigade commander in the II Corps; commander of the II Corps	
William Tecumseh Sherman	1840	Major General; Battle of Shiloh, Vicksburg Campaign, Chattanooga campaign, Atlanta campaign, Carolinas campaign, led the brutal Savannah Campaign (March to the Sea) from Atlanta to Savannah that demoralized the South; Commanding General of the United States Army (1869–1883)	
George Henry Thomas	1840	Major General; Mexican–American War; Battle of Mill Springs, Battle of Perryville, Battle of Stones River, Battle of Chickamauga, Battle of Missionary Ridge, Battle of Nashville; division commander in the Army of the Ohio; commander of the Army of the Cumberland; Fort Thomas, Kentucky, is named for him	
Stewart Van Vliet	1840	Major General; Second Seminole War, Mexican–American War, Utah War; chief quartermaster of the Army of the Potomac, quartermaster in New York City	
John Milton Brannan	1841	Major General; Mexican–American War; Battle of Saint John's Bluff, Tullahoma Campaign, Chickamauga Campaign, Battle of Missionary Ridge, Battle of Resaca, Battle of Dallas, Battle of Kennesaw Mountain	
William T. H. Brooks	1841	Major General; Second Seminole War, Mexican–American War; Peninsula Campaign, wounded at the Battle of Savage's Station, Battle of South Mountain, Battle of Fredericksburg, Battle of Chancellorsville, Gettysburg campaign, Battle of Cold Harbor, Siege of Petersburg; brigade commander in the IV Corps and VI Corps; commander of the Department of the Monongahela; division commander in the XVIII Corps	
Don Carlos Buell	1841	Major General; Seminole Wars, Mexican–American War; Battle of Shiloh, Siege of Corinth, Battle of Perryville; commander of the Army of the Ohio; first cousin of Brigadier General George P. Buell	
Albion P. Howe	1841	Major General; Mexican–American War; Second Battle of Bull Run, Battle of Antietam, Battle of Fredericksburg, Battle of Gettysburg, relieved of division level command after Gettysburg, served in the honor guard that stood watch over the corpse of Abraham Lincoln, member of the military commission that tried the Lincoln conspirators	
Nathaniel Lyon	1841	Brigadier General; Seminole Wars, Mexican–American War, Bloody Island Massacre; involved in early battles in Missouri, first Union general killed in the American Civil War, at the Battle of Wilson's Creek	
John F. Reynolds	1841	Major General; Mexican–American War; Seven Days Battles, Second Battle of Bull Run, Battle of Fredericksburg, Battle of Chancellorsville, killed at the very start of the Battle of Gettysburg; brother of Rear Admiral Will Reynolds	
Israel B. Richardson	1841	Major General; Second Seminole War, Mexican–American War; First Battle of Bull Run, Battle of Yorktown, Battle of Seven Pines, Seven Days Battles, Second Battle of Bull Run, Battle of South Mountain, mortally wounded at the Battle of Antietam; descendant of Major General Israel Putnam; Fort Richardson was named for him	
Horatio Wright	1841	Major General; First Battle of Bull Run, Battle of Gettysburg, Mine Run Campaign, Overland Campaign, Valley Campaigns of 1864, Siege of Petersburg, Appomattox Campaign, commander of the VI Corps of the Army of the Potomac (1864–1865); Chief of Engineers (1879–1884)	
Darius N. Couch	1842	Brigadier General; Battle of Yorktown, Battle of Williamsburg, Battle of Seven Pines, Battle of Oak Grove, Battle of Malvern Hill, Maryland Campaign, Battle of Fredericksburg, Battle of Chancellorsville, Gettysburg campaign, Franklin-Nashville Campaign, Carolinas campaign; brigade commander in the Army of the Potomac; division commander in the VI Corps and XXIII Corps; commander of the II Corps; commander of the Department of the Susquehanna	
Abner Doubleday	1842	Major General; Mexican–American War, Indian Wars; Peninsula Campaign, Second Battle of Bull Run, Battle of Antietam, Battle of Fredericksburg, Battle of Gettysburg, Valley Campaigns of 1864; division commander in the Army of the Potomac; brigade commander in the III Corps; division commander in the I Corps; the Navy vessel SS Abner Doubleday was named for him; the Auburn Doubledays are named for him; Doubleday Field is named for him	
John Newton	1842	Brigadier General; Utah War; coastal fortifications engineer; I Corps commander, Peninsula Campaign, Maryland Campaign, Battle of Fredericksburg, Battle of Gettysburg; Chief of Engineers (1884–1886); Commissioner of Public Works, New York City (1886–88); President, Panama Railroad Company (1888–95)	
John Pope	1842	Major General; topographic engineer and surveyor; Dakota War of 1862, Apache Wars; defeated at the Second Battle of Bull Run, commander of Army of the Mississippi and Army of Virginia	
William Rosecrans	1842	Major General; commander Army of the Cumberland, Battle of Stones River, Tullahoma Campaign, Battle of Chickamauga; U.S. Minister to Mexico (1868–1969); U.S. Representative from California (1881–1885); Register of the Treasury (1885–1893)	
George Sykes	1842	Major General; Seminole Wars, Mexican–American War; First Battle of Bull Run, Battle of Gaines's Mill, Second Battle of Bull Run, Battle of Fredericksburg, Battle of Chancellorsville, Battle of Gettysburg, Mine Run Campaign; battalion commander in the 14th Infantry Regiment; division commander in the V Corps; commander of the V Corps	
Christopher C. Augur	1843	Major General; Mexican–American War; wounded at the Battle of Cedar Mountain, Siege of Port Hudson; division commander in the Army of the Gulf; commander of the XII Corps; commander of the Department of the Platte; Camp Augur was named for him	
William B. Franklin	1843	Major General; Mexican–American War; Peninsula Campaign, Battle of Antietam, Battle of Fredericksburg, Gettysburg campaign, wounded at the Battle of Mansfield; great-grandson of Continental Congressional Delegate Samuel Rhoads	
Ulysses S. Grant	1843	General of the Army of the United States; Mexican–American War; Siege of Vicksburg, Chattanooga campaign, Siege of Petersburg, accepted Confederate surrender at Appomattox Court House; 18th President of the United States (1869–1877)	
Charles Smith Hamilton	1843	Major General; Mexican–American War; Battle of Yorktown, Battle of Iuka, Second Battle of Corinth; division commander in the Army of the Potomac and the III Corps	
Rufus Ingalls	1843	Major General; Mexican–American War; Peninsula Campaign, Northern Virginia Campaign, Maryland Campaign; Quartermaster General of the U.S. Army	
Henry M. Judah	1843	Brigadier General; Mexican–American War; Battle of Shiloh, Siege of Corinth, Battle of Buffington Island, Battle of Resaca; division commander in the XXIII Corps	
John J. Peck	1843	Major General; Mexican–American War; Battle of Yorktown, Battle of Williamsburg, Battle of Fair Oaks, Seven Days Battles, Battle of Malvern Hill, Battle of Hill's Point; brigade commander in the IV Corps	
Winfield Scott Hancock	1844	Major General; Mexican–American War; Battle of Gettysburg, Battle of the Wilderness, Battle of Spotsylvania Court House, led the Army of the Potomac; Democratic Party nominee for President (1880)	
Alexander Hays	1844	Major General; Mexican–American War; Battle of Yorktown, Battle of Williamsburg, Battle of Seven Pines, Battle of Savage's Station, Battle of Malvern Hill, Seven Days Battles, Second Battle of Bull Run, Battle of Harpers Ferry, Battle of Gettysburg, Bristoe Campaign, Battle of Mine Run, killed at the Battle of the Wilderness; brigade commander in the XXII Corps and II Corps; son of U.S. Representative Samuel Hays; Fort Hays was named for him	
Alfred Pleasonton	1844	Major General; Peninsula Campaign, wounded at the Battle of Antietam, Battle of Chancellorsville, Battle of Brandy Station, Battle of Byram's Ford, Battle of Marais des Cygnes; brigade commander in the Army of the Potomac; Internal Revenue Service Commissioner; Pleasanton, California, and Pleasanton, Kansas, are named for him	
Gordon Granger	1845	Major General; Mexican–American War; Battle of Wilson's Creek, Battle of Island Number Ten, Siege of Corinth, Battle of Chickamauga, Chattanooga campaign, Battle of Mobile Bay, Battle of Fort Blakeley; division commander in the Army of the Mississippi; commander of the Army of Kentucky; commander of the IV Corps and XIII Corps	
John Porter Hatch	1845	Major General; fought in the Mexican War where he was breveted twice for bravery in battle; awarded the Medal of Honor for bravery at the Battle of South Mountain during the Maryland Campaign where he was wounded and had two mounts shot from underneath him; later served on the western frontier; retired to New York City and was awarded the Medal of Honor in 1893	
Fitz John Porter	1845	Major General; Mexican–American War; Battle of Yorktown, Battle of Gaines's Mill, Battle of Malvern Hill, Second Battle of Bull Run, Battle of Antietam; division commander in the Army of the Potomac; nephew of Navy Commodore David Porter; cousin of Navy Commodore William D. Porter and Navy Admirals David Dixon Porter and David Farragut	
David Allen Russell	1845	Brigadier General; Mexican–American War, Rogue River Wars, Yakima War; Seven Days Battles, Battle of Antietam, Battle of Fredericksburg, Overland Campaign, killed at the Battle of Opequon; son of U.S. Representative David Abel Russell; Fort D.A. Russell was named for him	
William Farrar Smith	1845	Major General; First Battle of Bull Run, Battle of White Oak Swamp, Battle of Antietam, Battle of Fredericksburg, Gettysburg campaign, Battle of Wauhatchie, Battle of Cold Harbor, Siege of Petersburg; commander of the VI Corps and XVIII Corps; U.S. Consul in Guaymas, Mexico; cousin of Vermont Governor J. Gregory Smith	
Charles Pomeroy Stone	1845	Brigadier General; Lieutenant General in the Egyptian Army; Mexican–American War; First Battle of Bull Run, Battle of Ball's Bluff, Siege of Petersburg; division and brigade commander in the Union Army of the Shenandoah	
Thomas J. Wood	1845	Major General; Mexican–American War; Battle of Shiloh, wounded at the Battle of Stones River, Battle of Chickamauga, Battle of Missionary Ridge, wounded at the Battle of Lovejoy's Station, Battle of Nashville; division commander in the Army of the Ohio and Army of the Cumberland; commander of the IV Corps	
Charles Champion Gilbert	1846	Major General; Mexican–American War; Battle of Wilson's Creek, Battle of Shiloh, Siege of Corinth, Battle of Perryville, Battle of Franklin; commander of the Army of Kentucky	
George Henry Gordon	1846	Major General; Mexican–American War; Battle of Antietam; brigade commander in the XII Corps; division commander in the XII Corp and XI Corps	
George B. McClellan	1846	Major General; developed the McClellan Saddle; organized the Army of the Potomac after the Union forces were defeated at First Battle of Bull Run, Peninsula Campaign, Battle of Antietam; son George B. McClellan, Jr. served as United States Representative from New York (1895–1903) and as Mayor of New York City (1904–1909)	
Innis N. Palmer	1846	Major General; Mexican–American War; Indian Wars; First Battle of Bull Run, Seven Days Battles, Battle of Wyse Fork; grandfather of Major General Innis P. Swift	
Jesse L. Reno	1846	Major General; Mexican–American War; Burnside's North Carolina Expedition, Second Battle of Bull Run, Battle of Chantilly, killed at the Battle of South Mountain; Fort Reno in Oklahoma and Fort Reno in Wyoming were named for him; Reno, Nevada, is named for him; Reno County, Kansas, is named for him	
Truman Seymour	1846	Brigadier General; Mexican–American War, Third Seminole War; Battle of Fort Sumter, Battle of Beaver Dam Creek, Battle of Gaines' Mill, Battle of Glendale, Battle of Malvern Hill. Second Battle of Bull Run, Battle of South Mountain, Battle of Antietam, Battle of Olustee, Battle of the Wilderness, Siege of Petersburg, Battle of Sayler's Creek, Appomattox Campaign; commander of Camp Curtin; brigade commander in the VI Corps; division commander in the VI Corps; commander of Fort Warren and Fort Preble	
George Stoneman	1846	Major General; Seven Days Battles, Battle of Fredericksburg, Battle of Chancellorsville, Atlanta campaign; commander of Fort Brown; division commander in the II Corps and III Corps; corps commander in the Army of the Ohio; Governor of California; Camp Stoneman was named for him	
Samuel D. Sturgis	1846	Major General; Mexican–American War; Battle of Wilson's Creek, Battle of South Mountain, Battle of Antietam, Battle of Fredericksburg, Battle of Dandridge, Battle of Fair Garden, Battle of Brice's Crossroads; division commander in the IX Corps; grandfather of Lieutenant General Samuel D. Sturgis III; the Navy vessel USS General S. D. Sturgis was named for him; Sturgis, South Dakota, is named for him	
Romeyn B. Ayres	1847	Major General; Mexican–American War; Battle of Blackburn's Ford, First Battle of Bull Run, Peninsula Campaign, Seven Days Battles, Battle of Antietam, Battle of Fredericksburg, Battle of Chancellorsville, Battle of Gettysburg, Overland Campaign, Siege of Petersburg, Appomattox Campaign; brigade commander in the V Corps	
Ambrose Burnside	1847	Major General; Mexican–American War; First Battle of Bull Run, Battle of Roanoke Island, Battle of New Bern, Battle of South Mountain, Battle of Antietam, Battle of Fredericksburg, Battle of Campbell's Station, Battle of Fort Sanders, Battle of the Wilderness, Battle of Spotsylvania Court House, Battle of Cold Harbor, Siege of Petersburg, Battle of the Crater; commander of the First Regiment Rhode Island U.S. Volunteers; commander of the I Corps and IX Corps; commander of the Army of the Potomac; commander of the Department of the Ohio; U.S. Senator from Rhode Island; Governor of Rhode Island	
John G. Foster	1847	Major General; Mexican–American War; Battle of Fort Sumter, Battle of Roanoke Island, Battle of New Bern, Battle of Fort Macon, Battle of Washington, Battle of Kinston, Battle of White Hall, Battle of Goldsborough Bridge, Second Battle of Charleston Harbor, Knoxville Campaign, Sherman's March to the Sea; commander of the Department of the Ohio and the Army of the Ohio	
James Barnet Fry	1847	Major General; Mexican–American War; Provost Marshal General; Adjutant General of the U.S. Army	
John Gibbon	1847	Major General; Mexican–American War, Seminole Wars, Great Sioux War of 1876–77, Nez Perce War; Second Battle of Bull Run, Battle of South Mountain, Battle of Antietam, wounded at the Battle of Fredericksburg, Battle of Chancellorsville, Second Battle of Fredericksburg, wounded during the Battle of Gettysburg, Battle of the Wilderness, Battle of Spotsylvania Court House, Battle of Cold Harbor, Siege of Petersburg, Battle of Appomattox Court House; commander of the Iron Brigade; division commander in the I Corps and II Corps; commander of XVIII Corps and XXIV Corps; commander of the Department of the Platte; cousin of Confederate States Brigadier General J. Johnston Pettigrew; Gibbon, Minnesota, is named for him	
Charles Griffin	1847	Major General; Mexican–American War; First Battle of Bull Run, Battle of Gaines' Mill, Battle of Malvern Hill, Battle of Antietam, Battle of Fredericksburg, Battle of Chancellorsville, Battle of Gettysburg, Battle of Mine Run, Overland Campaign, Siege of Petersburg, Battle of Five Forks; division commander in the V Corps; commander of the V Corps; Fort Griffin was named for him	
Egbert Ludovicus Viele	1847	Brigadier General; Mexican–American War; served at siege of Fort Pulaski and was appointed Military Governor of Norfolk, Virginia, resigned in 1863 to engage in civil engineering; created the Viele Map of New York City; U.S. Representative from New York (1885–1887)	
Orlando B. Willcox	1847	Major General; awarded the Medal of Honor in 1895 for gallantry at the First Battle of Bull Run where he was captured; later released as part of a prisoner exchange and served in the Virginia and North Carolina theaters at the end of the war	
John Buford	1848	Major General; Bleeding Kansas, Utah War; Second Battle of Bull Run, Battle of South Mountain, Battle of Antietam, Battle of Brandy Station, Battle of Upperville, Battle of Gettysburg, Bristoe Campaign; brigade commander in the II Corps; brother of Major General Napoleon Bonaparte Buford; cousin of Confederate States Brigadier General Abraham Buford II; Fort Buford was named for him	
James Chatham Duane	1848	Brigadier General; Utah War; Battle of Harpers Ferry; Chief of Engineers (1886–1888); grandson of Continental Congressional Delegate James Duane	
Absalom Baird	1849	Major General; attended Washington & Jefferson College before graduating from West Point; earned fame for actions at the Battle of Chickamauga, Third Battle of Chattanooga, and Battle of Jonesborough; received the Medal of Honor in 1896 for his actions at Jonesborough; later received the French Légion d'honneur	
John Parke	1849	Major General; Battle of Fort Macon, Battle of Antietam, Battle of Fredericksburg, Vicksburg Campaign, Overland Campaign, Siege of Petersburg, Battle of the Crater, Battle of Globe Tavern, Battle of Peebles's Farm, Battle of Boydton Plank Road, Battle of Fort Stedman, Third Battle of Petersburg; division commander in the IX Corps; commander of the IX Corps and XXII Corps; commander of the Army of the Potomac; Superintendent of the United States Military Academy	
Rufus Saxton	1849	Brigadier General; Battle of Harpers Ferry; recipient of the Medal of Honor	
Eugene Asa Carr	1850	Major General; Indian Wars, Bleeding Kansas, Utah War; Battle of Wilson's Creek, Battle of Pea Ridge, Battle of Port Gibson, Battle of Champion Hill, Camden Expedition, Battle of Fort Blakeley; division commander in the Army of the Southwest; division commander in the XIII Corps and VII Corps; recipient of the Medal of Honor	
Adam J. Slemmer	1850	Brigadier General; Seminole Wars; incapacitated by wounds at Battle of Stones River	
Gouverneur K. Warren	1850	Major General; commended at the battle of Little Round Top, Chief of Engineers of the Army of the Potomac during the American Civil War; participated in topographical and railroad explorations of the Mississippi River and trans-Mississippi West	
Alvan Cullem Gillem	1851	Major General; Second Seminole War, Modoc War; Battle of Mill Springs	
Charles Henry Tompkins	1851 ex	Dropped out of the Academy after two years for unspecified reasons; Brigadier General; recipient of the Medal of Honor for twice charging through the enemy's lines on July 1, 1861, near Fairfax, Virginia, making him the first Union officer of the Civil War to receive the Medal of Honor	
George Crook	1852	Major General; Indian Wars; Battle of South Mountain, Battle of Antietam, Battle of Chickamauga, Battle of Cloyd's Mountain, Third Battle of Winchester, Battle of Fisher's Hill, Battle of Cedar Creek, Appomattox Campaign; brigade commander in the Kanawha Division; division commander in the Army of the Cumberland; commander of the VIII Corps; Fort Crook was named for him; the General Crook House is named for him; Crook, Colorado, is named for him; Crook County, Wyoming, and Crook County, Oregon, are named for him	
August Kautz	1852	Major General; Mexican–American War, Rogue River War, Puget Sound War; Peninsula Campaign, Battle of Fort Sanders; division commander in the XXV Corps	
Alexander McDowell McCook	1852	Major General; Indian Wars; First Battle of Bull Run, Battle of Shiloh, Siege of Corinth, Battle of Perryville, Battle of Stones River, Battle of Chickamauga, Battle of Fort Stevens; division commander in the Army of the Ohio; commander of the I Corps and XX Corps; commander of Fort Leavenworth and the United States Army Command and General Staff College; brother of Brigadier General Robert Latimer McCook, Brigadier General Daniel McCook, Jr., and Major General and Dakota Territory Governor Edwin Stanton McCook; McCook Field was named for him and his family who were known as the "Fighting McCooks"	
Henry Warner Slocum	1852	Major General; Seminole Wars; First Battle of Bull Run, Battle of Gaines' Mill, Second Battle of Bull Run, Battle of South Mountain, Battle of Fredericksburg, Battle of Chancellorsville, Battle of Gettysburg, Franklin-Nashville Campaign, Sherman's March to the Sea, Battle of Averasborough, Battle of Bentonville; brigade commander in the I Corps; division commander in the VI Corps; commander of the XII Corps and XX Corps; U.S. Representative from New York; Fort Slocum was named for him; the steamship PS General Slocum was named for him	
David S. Stanley	1852	Major General; recipient of the Medal of Honor for his actions organizing a counterattack at the Second Battle of Franklin, commander of the IV Corps	
James B. McPherson	1853	Major General; Battle of Fort Henry, Battle of Fort Donelson, Battle of Shiloh, Siege of Vicksburg, Battle of Marietta, killed during the Battle of Atlanta; commander of the XVII Corps; Fort McPherson was named for him; the Fort McPherson National Cemetery is named for him	
John Schofield	1853	Lieutenant General; recipient of the Medal of Honor for his actions leading an attack at the Battle of Wilson's Creek, Atlanta campaign, Battle of Franklin, Battle of Nashville, Battle of Wyse Fork; commander of the Army of the Frontier, division commander in the XIV Corps; United States Secretary of War (1868–1869); Superintendent of the Academy (1876–1881); Commanding General of the United States Army (1888–1895); Military Governor of Virginia	
Philip Sheridan	1853	General; Chattanooga campaign, Overland Campaign, Valley Campaigns of 1864, used scorched earth tactics in the Shenandoah Valley and forced Lee's surrender in the Appomattox Campaign; American Indian Wars	
Joshua W. Sill	1853	Major General; killed at the Battle of Stones River; brigade commander in the Army of the Ohio and Army of the Cumberland; Fort Sill is named for him	
William Sooy Smith	1853	Brigadier General; colonel, 13th Ohio Infantry; promoted brigadier general for services at the Battle of Shiloh; Battle of Perryville, Vicksburg Campaign, Battle of Okolona; brigade and division commander in the Army of the Ohio; cavalry division commander in the Army of the Tennessee; chief of cavalry, Department of Tennessee and Military Division of Mississippi; resigned 15 July 1864 citing health reasons	
William R. Terrill	1853	Brigadier General; Bleeding Kansas; Battle of Shiloh, killed at the Battle of Perryville; brigade commander in the Army of the Ohio	
Zenas Bliss	1854	Major General; recipient of the Medal of Honor for his actions at the Battle of Fredericksburg; formed the first unit of Seminole-Negro Indian Scouts	
Oliver O. Howard	1854	Major General; Indian Wars; First Battle of Bull Run, recipient of the Medal of Honor for his actions leading an attack at the Battle of Seven Pines despite a wound which resulted in the loss of his right arm, Battle of Antietam, Battle of Chancellorsville, Battle of Gettysburg, Chattanooga campaign, Atlanta campaign, Sherman's March to the Sea; brigade commander in the II Corps; commander of the II Corps, IV Corps, and XI Corps; Superintendent of the United States Military Academy; founder of Howard University; led the campaign against Chief Joseph and the Nez Perce tribe	
Thomas H. Ruger	1854	Major General; Battle of Antietam, Battle of Chancellorsville, Battle of Gettysburg, Battle of Franklin; brigade commander in the XII Corps and XX Corps; division commander in the XII Corps; Military Governor of Georgia	
Stephen H. Weed	1854	Brigadier General; Third Seminole War; Bleeding Kansas; Utah War; Battle of Antietam, killed defending Little Round Top during the Battle of Gettysburg	
William W. Averell	1855	Major General; First Battle of Bull Run, Peninsula Campaign, Seven Days Battles, Battle of Fredericksburg, Battle of Kelly's Ford, Battle of Chancellorsville, Battle of Droop Mountain, Battle of Rutherford's Farm, Battle of Cove Mountain, Battle of Fisher's Hill; brigade commander in the Army of the Potomac; U.S. Consul General in British North America	
David McMurtrie Gregg	1855	Major General; Seven Days Battles, Battle of Antietam, Battle of Chancellorsville, Battle of Gettysburg, Battle of Yellow Tavern, Battle of Haw's Shop, Battle of Trevilian Station, Battle of Saint Mary's Church, Valley Campaigns of 1864, Siege of Petersburg, Second Battle of Deep Bottom, Second Battle of Ream's Station, Battle of Peebles' Farm; grandson of U.S. Senator Andrew Gregg; cousin of U.S. Representative Andrew Gregg Curtin	
William Babcock Hazen	1855	Major General; Indian Wars; Battle of Perryville, Battle of Stones River, Tullahoma Campaign, Battle of Chickamauga, Chattanooga campaign, Atlanta campaign, Sherman's March to the Sea, Carolinas campaign, Battle of Pickett's Mill; brigade commander in the Army of the Ohio and the XIV Corps; division commander in the XV Corps; Hazen Bay in Alaska is named for him	
Alfred Thomas Archimedes Torbert	1855	Major General; wounded in the Battle of South Mountain, Battle of Fredericksburg, Battle of Chancellorsville, Battle of Gettysburg, Battle of Tom's Brook	
Alexander S. Webb	1855	Major General; recipient of the Medal of Honor for his actions at the Battle of Gettysburg for personal bravery and leadership repulsing Pickett's Charge; president of the City College of New York (1869–1902)	
Godfrey Weitzel	1855	Major General; Siege of Port Hudson, First Battle of Fort Fisher; division commander in the XIX Corps; commander of the XVIII Corps and XXV Corps	
George Dashiell Bayard	1856	Brigadier General; Indian Wars; Battle of Port Republic, Battle of Cedar Mountain, killed during the Battle of Fredericksburg; cavalry commander in the Army of the Potomac; Fort Bayard was named for him; the Fort Bayard Historic District in Santa Clara, New Mexico, is named for him	
James W. Forsyth	1856	Major General; Indian Wars; Jackson's Valley Campaign, Peninsula Campaign, Battle of Antietam, Battle of Fredericksburg, Battle of Chickamauga, Overland Campaign, Appomattox Campaign, Battle of Cedar Creek, Battle of Five Forks; son-in-law of U.S. Postmaster General William Dennison, Jr.; Forsyth, Montana, is named for him	
William P. Sanders	1856	Brigadier General; Peninsula Campaign, Battle of Antietam	
Henry Martyn Robert	1857	Brigadier General; Pig War; Chief of Engineers (1901); author of Robert's Rules of Order	
George Crockett Strong	1857	Major General; First Battle of Bull Run, mortally wounded during the assault on Fort Wagner	
Abraham Arnold	1859	Brigadier General; recipient of the Medal of Honor for leading a cavalry charge against superior forces	
Wesley Merritt	1860	Brigadier General; Spanish–American War; Battle of Chancellorsville, wounded at the Battle of Brandy Station, Battle of Upperville, Battle of Gettysburg, Battle of Yellow Tavern, Battle of Opequon, Battle of Five Forks; brigade commander in the Army of the Potomac; division commander in the Army of the Potomac; Superintendent of the United States Military Academy; Military Governor of the Philippines	
Horace Porter	1860	Brigadier General; recipient of the Medal of Honor for his actions at the Battle of Chickamauga; United States Ambassador to France (1897–1905)	
James M. Warner	1860	Brigadier General; Battle of Spotsylvania Court House, Third Battle of Winchester, Battle of Fisher's Hill, Battle of Cedar Creek; commander of the 11th Vermont Infantry, brigade commander in the XXII Corps and VI Corps	
James H. Wilson	1860	Major General; Spanish–American War, Boxer Rebellion; Battle of Fort Pulaski, Battle of South Mountain, Battle of Antietam, Vicksburg Campaign, Chattanooga campaign, Overland Campaign, Valley Campaigns of 1864, Battle of Franklin, Battle of Nashville; commander of Wilson's Raid	
John Moulder Wilson	1860	Brigadier General; recipient of the Medal of Honor for his actions at the Battle of Malvern Hill despite acute illness; Superintendent of the Academy (1889–1893); Chief of Engineers (1897–1901)	
Adelbert Ames	1861 (May)	Major General; Spanish–American War; Battle of Yorktown, Battle of Gaines's Mill, Battle of Malvern Hill, Maryland Campaign, Battle of Fredericksburg, Battle of Gettysburg, Bermuda Hundred Campaign, Siege of Petersburg, Second Battle of Fort Fisher; commander of the 20th Maine Volunteer Infantry Regiment; brigade commander in the XI Corps; recipient of the Medal of Honor; United States Senator from Mississippi (1870–1874); Governor of Mississippi (1868–1870, 1874–1876); son-in-law of U.S. Representative and Major General Benjamin Franklin Butler; father of U.S. Representative Butler Ames	
Orville E. Babcock	1861 (May)	Brigadier General; Battle of Vicksburg, Battle of Blue Springs, Battle of Campbell's Station, Knoxville Campaign, Battle of the Wilderness, Battle of Spotsylvania Court House, Battle of Cold Harbor	
John W. Barlow	1861 (May)	Brigadier General; Indian Wars; Peninsula Campaign, Battle of Gettysburg, Atlanta campaign; Chief of Engineers; Barlow Peak in Yellowstone National Park is named for him	
Charles E. Hazlett	1861 (May)	1st Lieutenant, Battery D, 5th U.S. Artillery; Battery D, 4th U.S. Artillery (Antietam Campaign); killed in action at the Battle of Gettysburg, July 2, 1863	
Guy Vernor Henry	1861 (May)	Brigadier General; recipient of the Medal of Honor for actions repulsing an enemy attack at the Battle of Cold Harbor; son Major General Guy Vernor Henry Jr. is an Academy alumnus, class of 1894; Governor of Puerto Rico (1898–1899)	
Hugh Judson Kilpatrick	1861 (May)	Major General; the first Union officer to be wounded during the Civil War at the Battle of Big Bethel, Second Battle of Bull Run, Battle of Chancellorsville, Battle of Aldie, Battle of Upperville, Battle of Gettysburg, Overland Campaign, wounded at the Battle of Resaca, Sherman's March to the Sea, Battle of Monroe's Crossroads; brigade commander in the Army of the Potomac; division commander of the Army of the Cumberland and the Military Division of the Mississippi; U.S. Minister to Chile	
Emory Upton	1861 (May)	Major General; Battle of Fredericksburg, Battle of Spotsylvania Court House; excelled at infantry, artillery, and cavalry; influential military theorist and reformer of United States Army organization and methods	
George Armstrong Custer	1861 (June)	Major General; Battle of Antietam, Battle of Chancellorsville, leader of a charge at the Battle of Gettysburg that broke the back of the Confederate resistance; Battle of the Wilderness, Siege of Petersburg; Battle of the Washita, killed in action at the Battle of the Little Bighorn	
Ranald S. Mackenzie	1862	Major General; Indian Wars; wounded at the Second Battle of Bull Run, Battle of Antietam, wounded at the Battle of Gettysburg, Overland Campaign, Siege of Petersburg, Battle of Fort Stevens, wounded at the Third Battle of Winchester, wounded at the Battle of Cedar Creek, Battle of Five Forks, Battle of Appomattox Court House, Valley Campaigns of 1864; brigade commander in the VI Corps and the Army of the James; nephew of U.S. Senator John Slidell and Navy Commodore Matthew C. Perry	
George Lewis Gillespie, Jr.	1862	Brigadier General; recipient of the Medal of Honor for carrying dispatches under withering fire at the Battle of Cold Harbor; Chief of Engineers (1901–1904)	

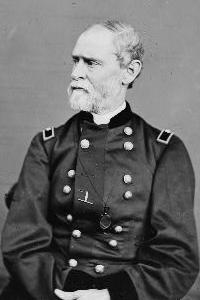
Joseph Horace Eaton (1835)

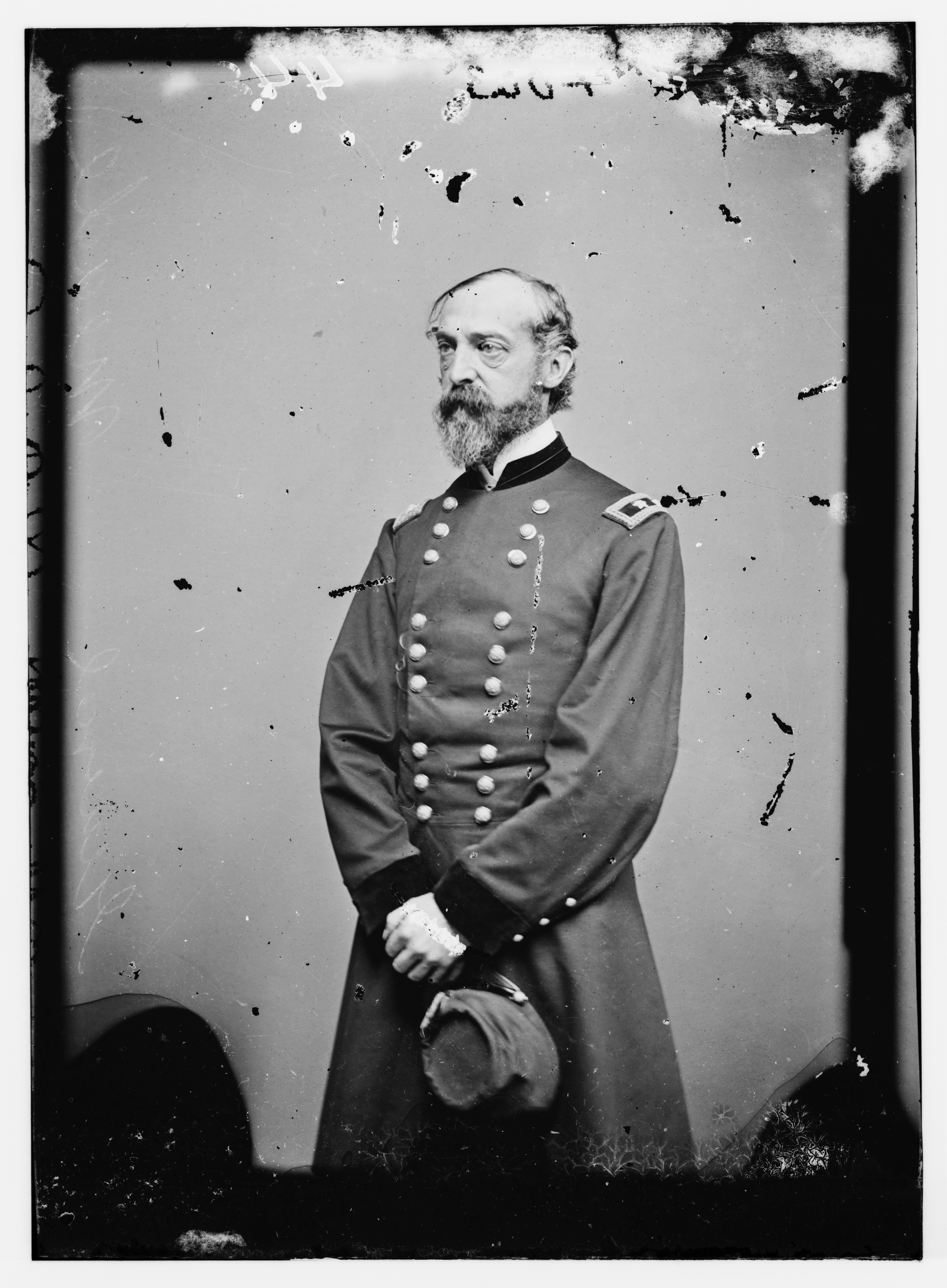
George Meade (1835)

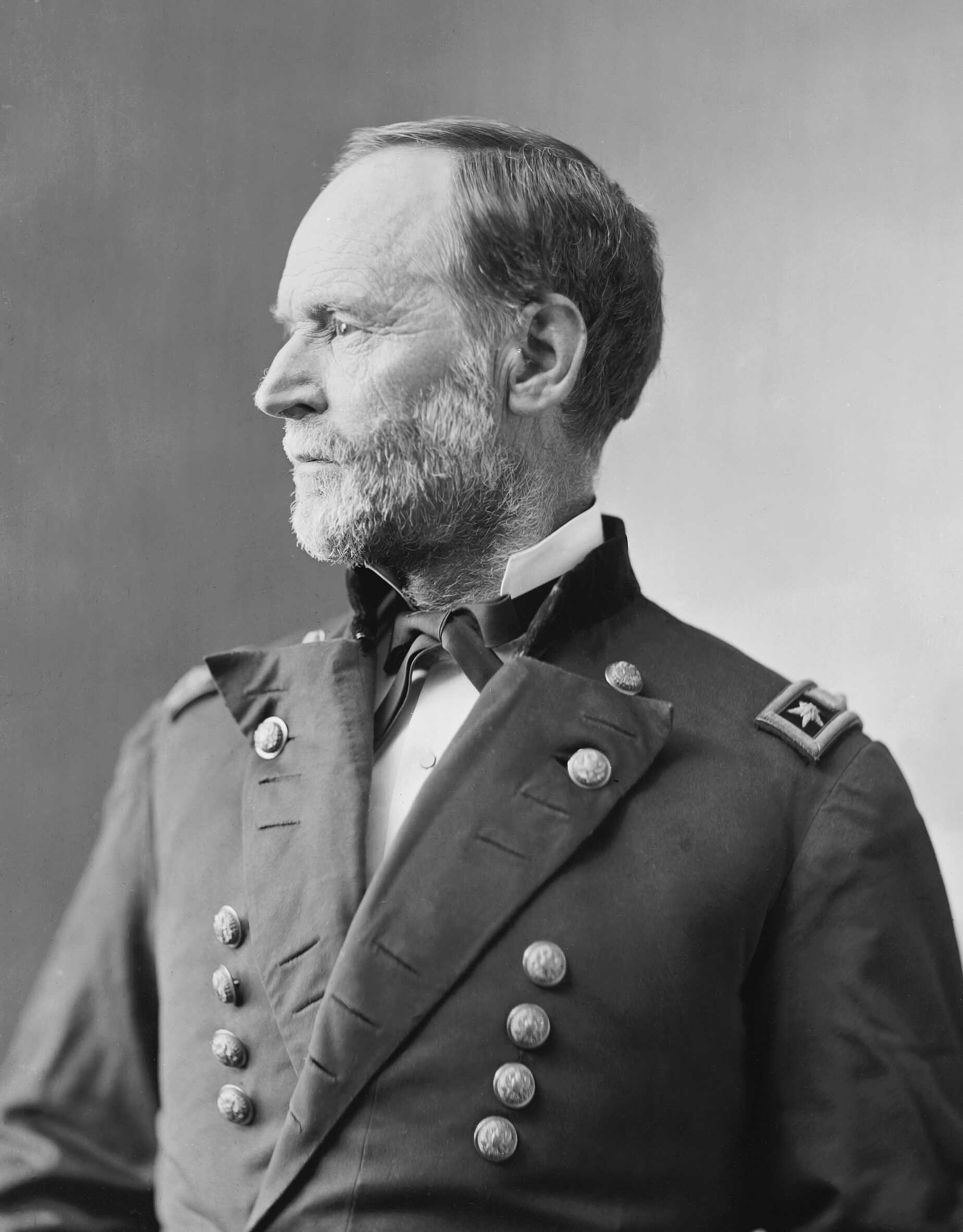
William Tecumseh Sherman (1840)

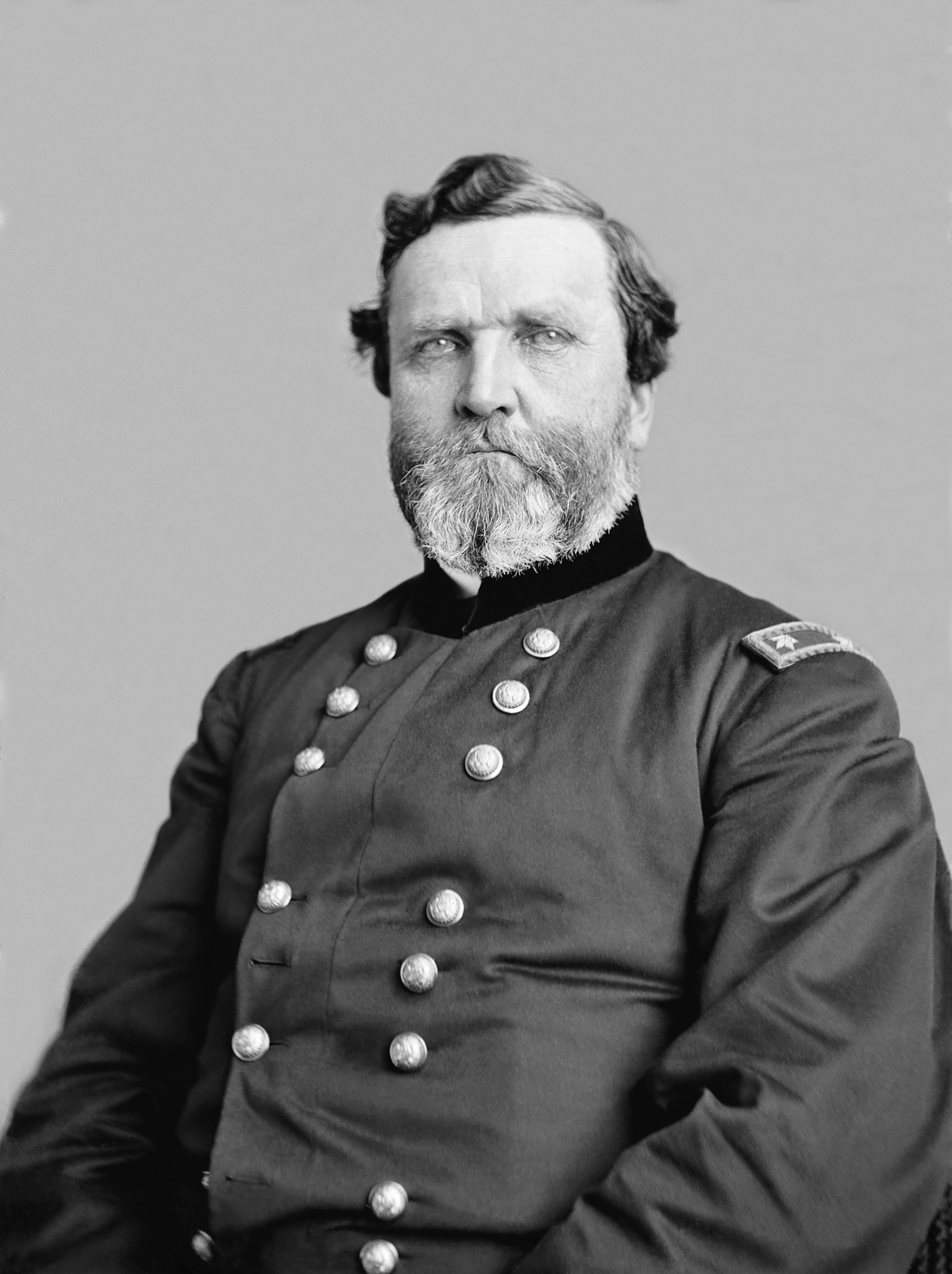
George Henry Thomas (1840)

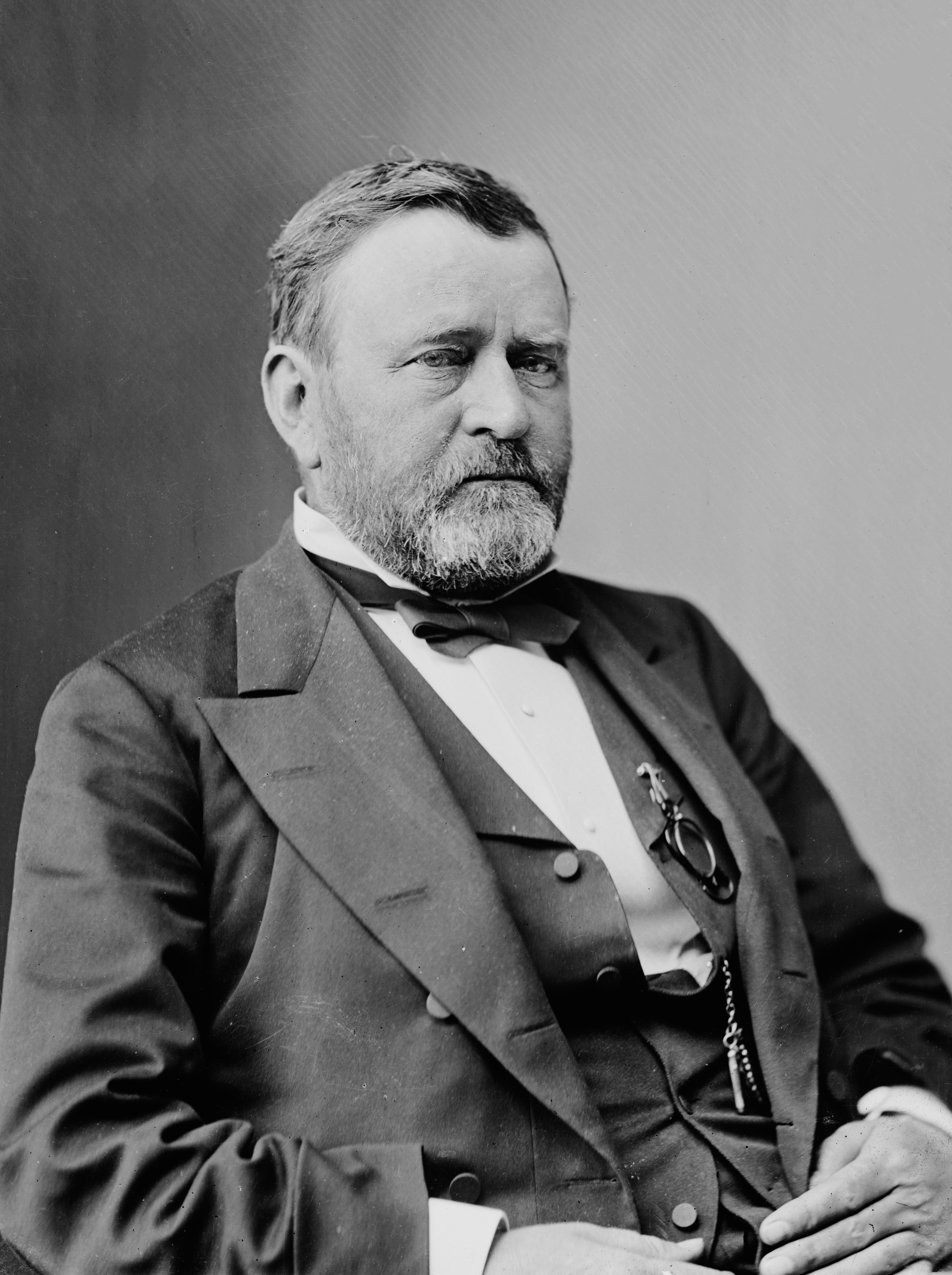
Ulysses S. Grant (1843)

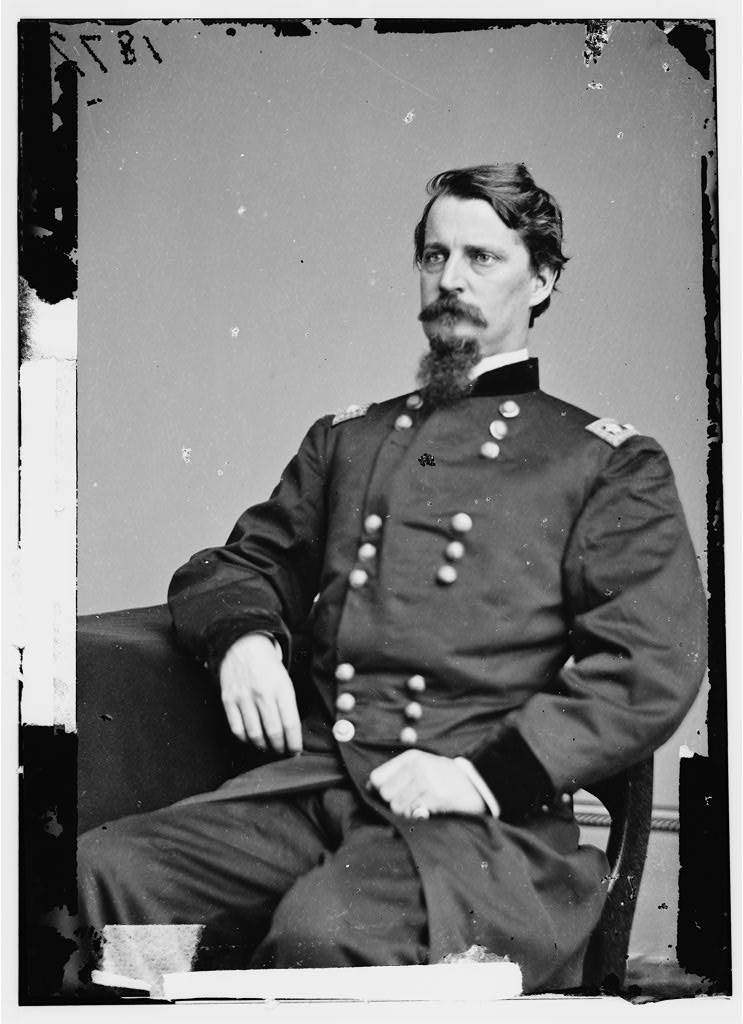
Winfield Scott Hancock (1844)

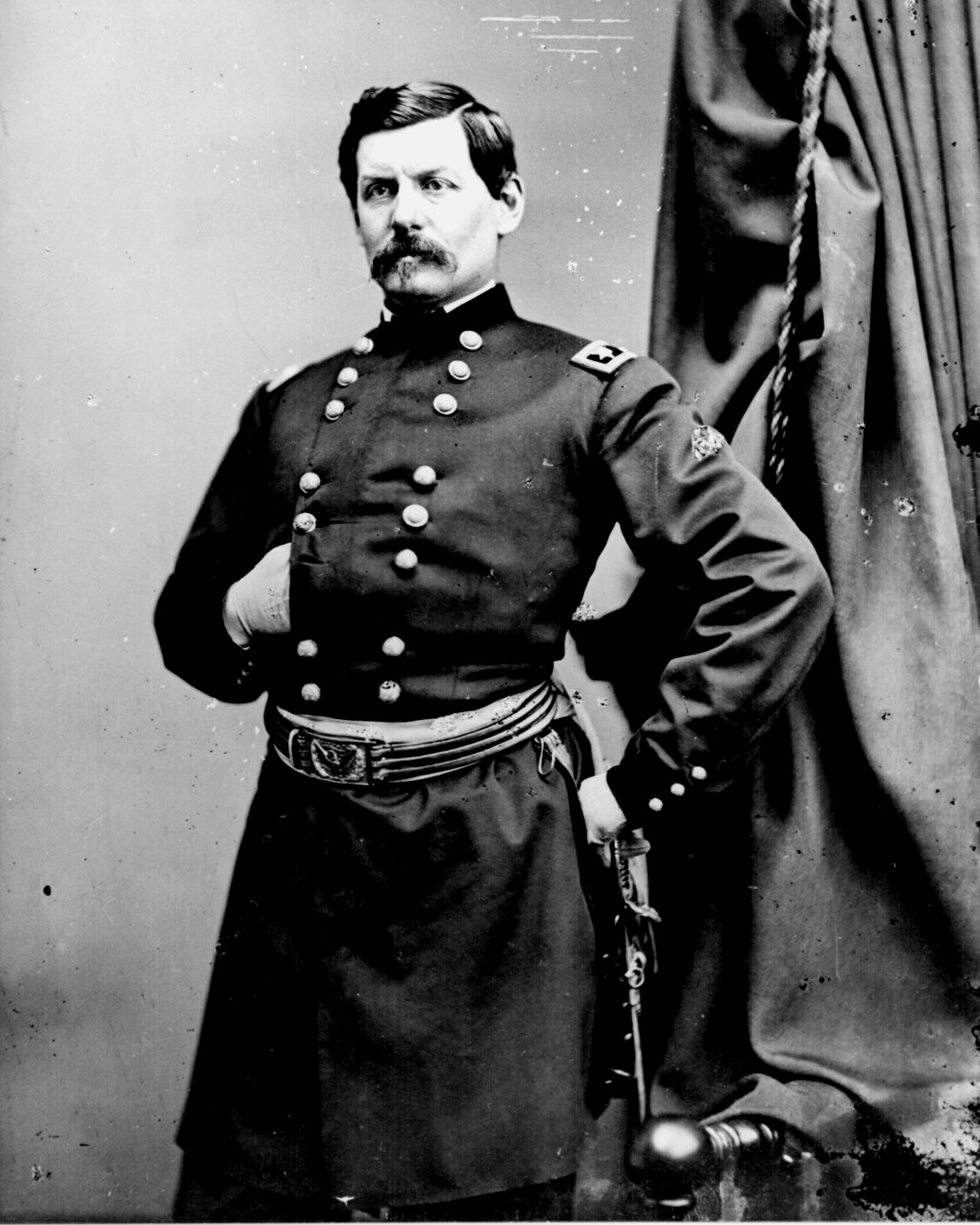
George McClellan (1846)

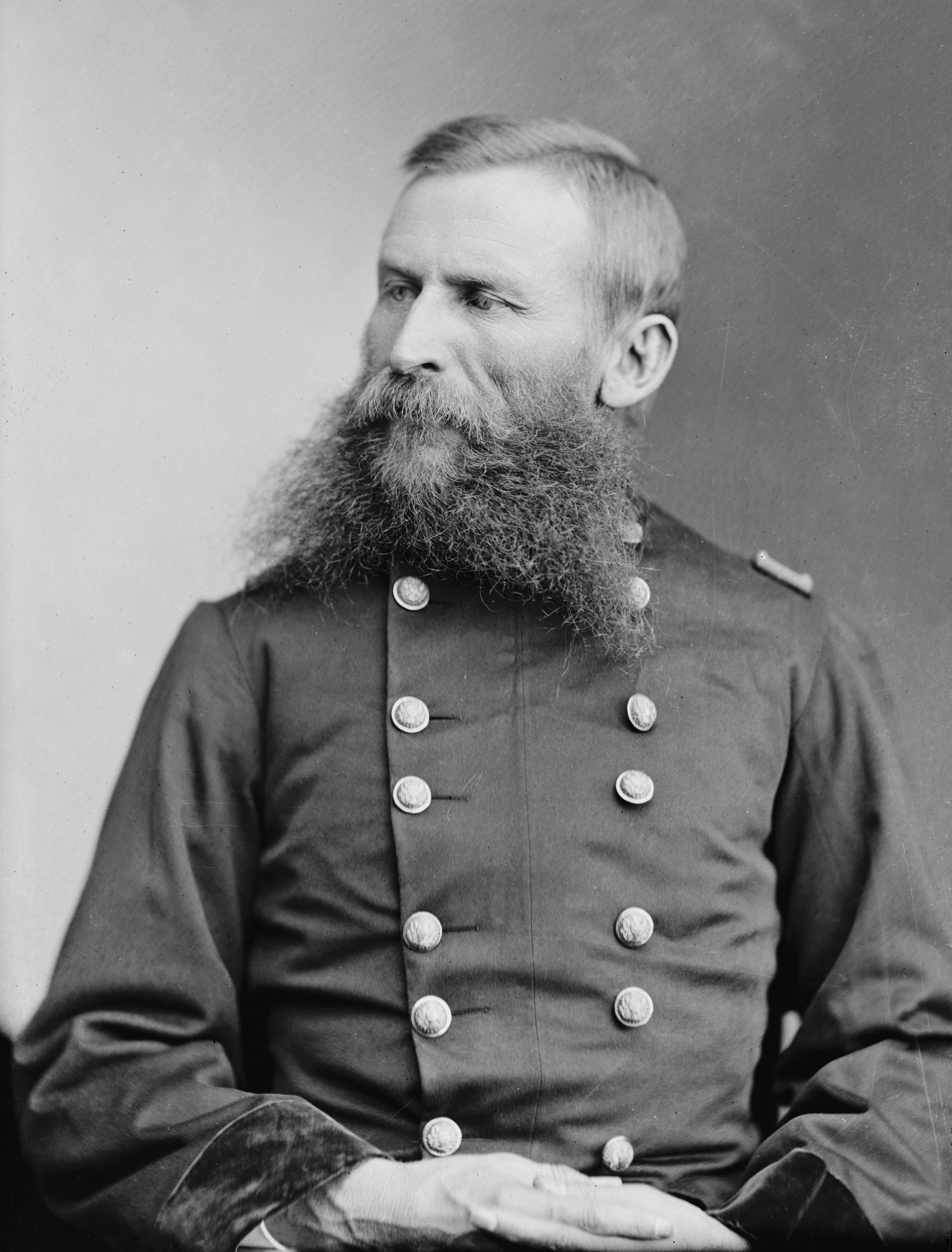
George Crook (1852)

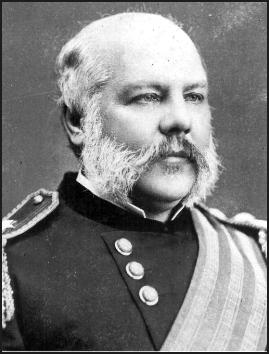
John Schofield (1853)

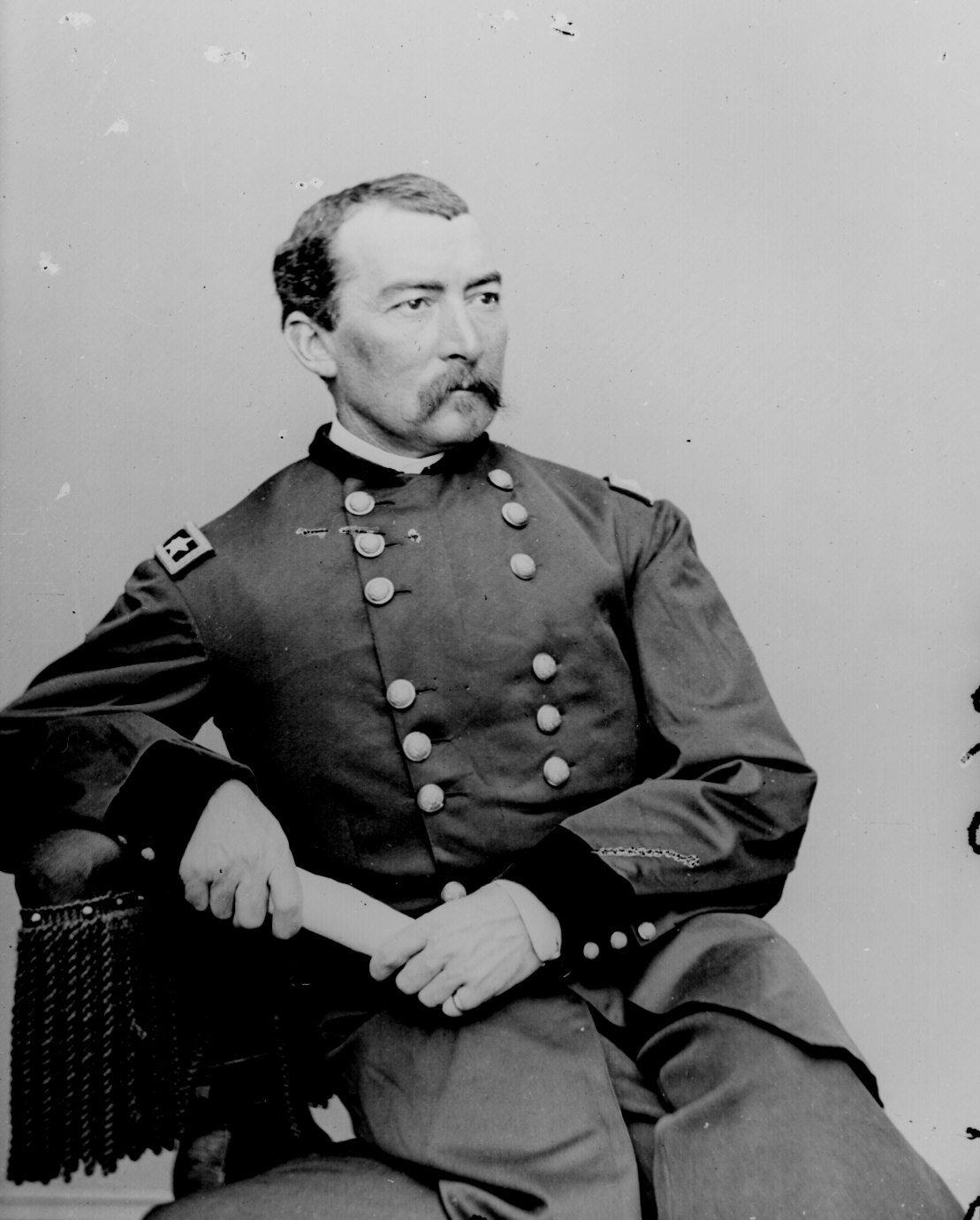
Philip Sheridan (1853)

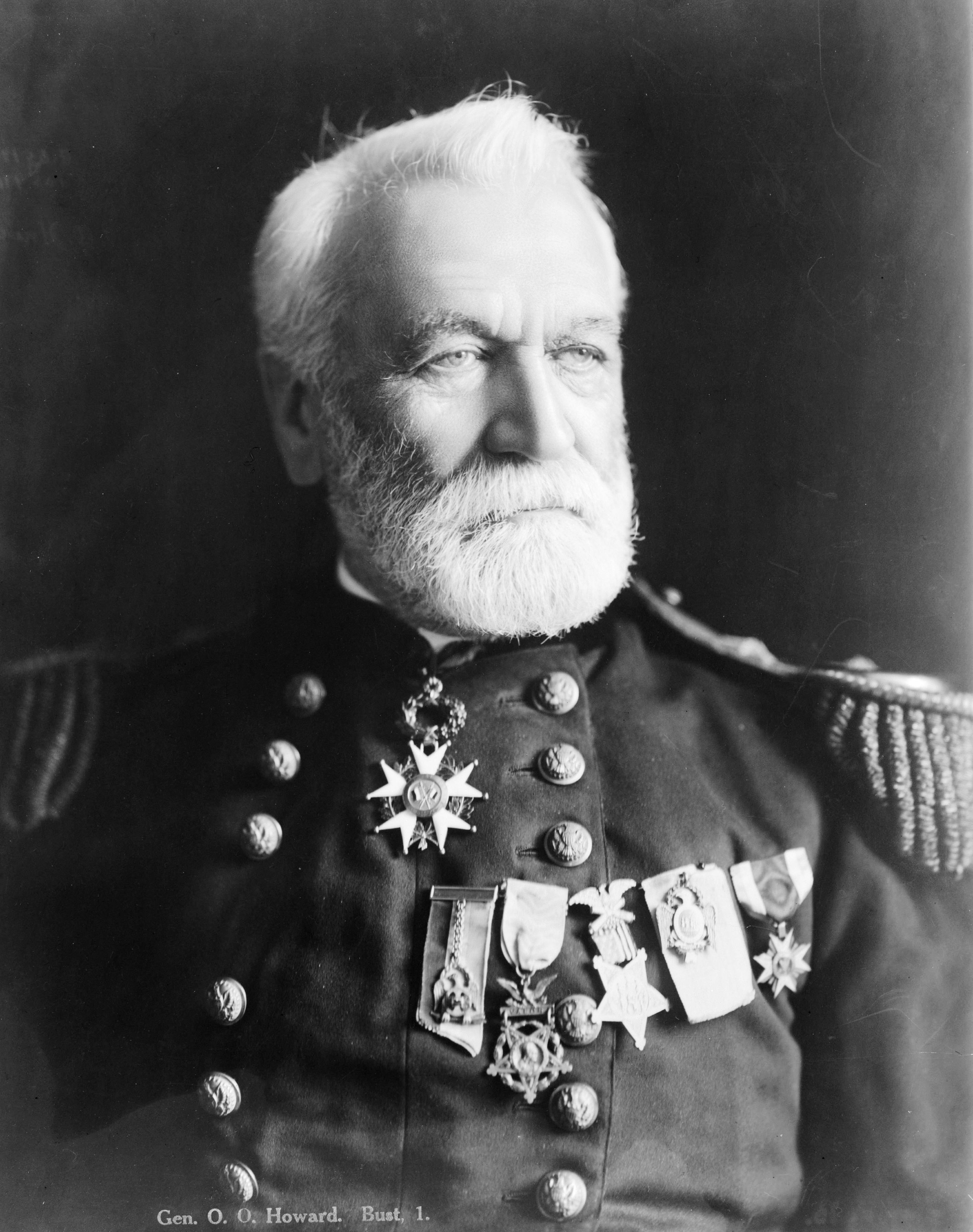
Oliver Howard (1854)

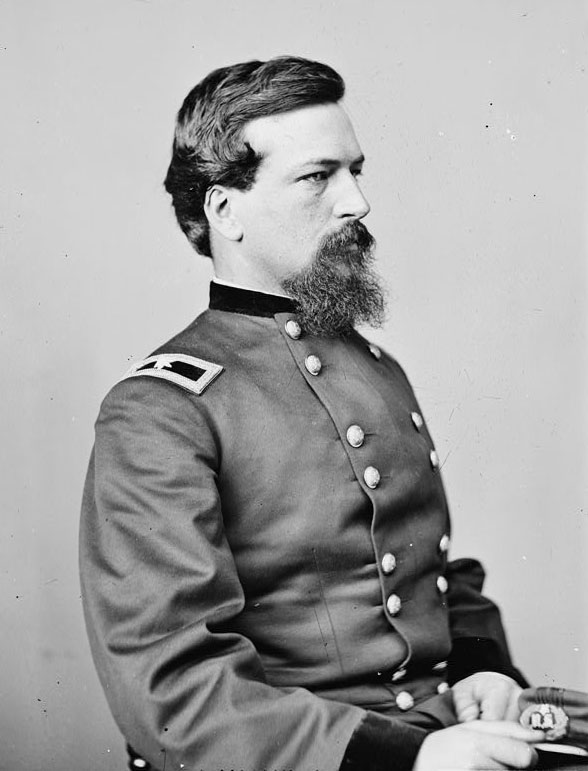
Alexander Webb (1855)

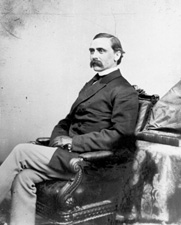
Adelbert Ames (1861)

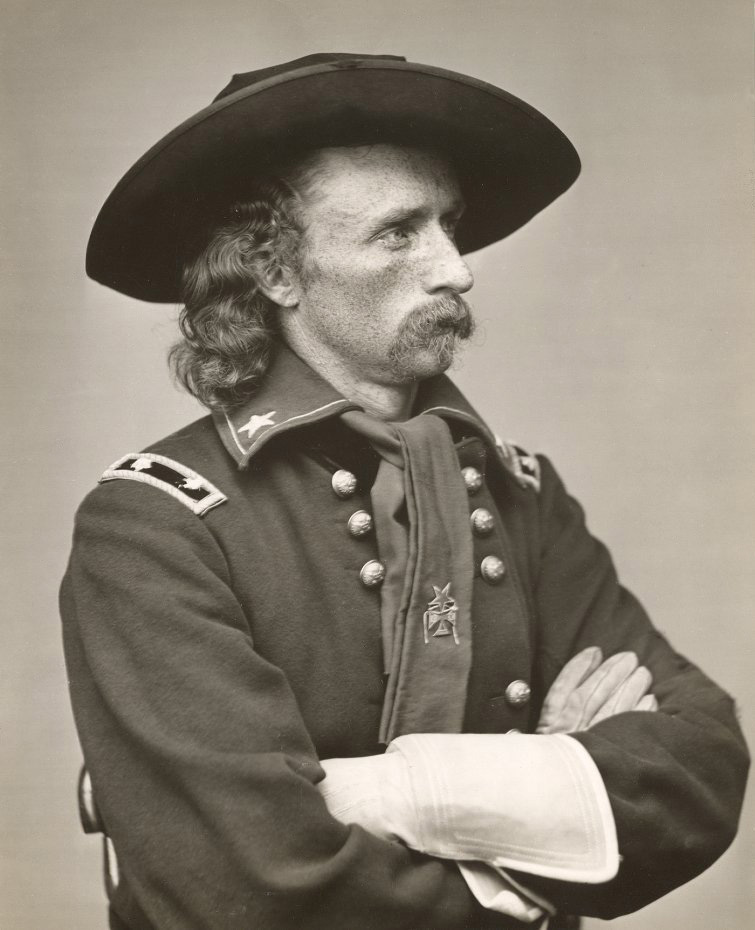
George Armstrong Custer (1861)

== See also ==
- List of Confederate States Army officers educated at the United States Military Academy
- List of Union Navy officers educated at the United States Naval Academy
