= Neville B. Craig =

American journalist and politician

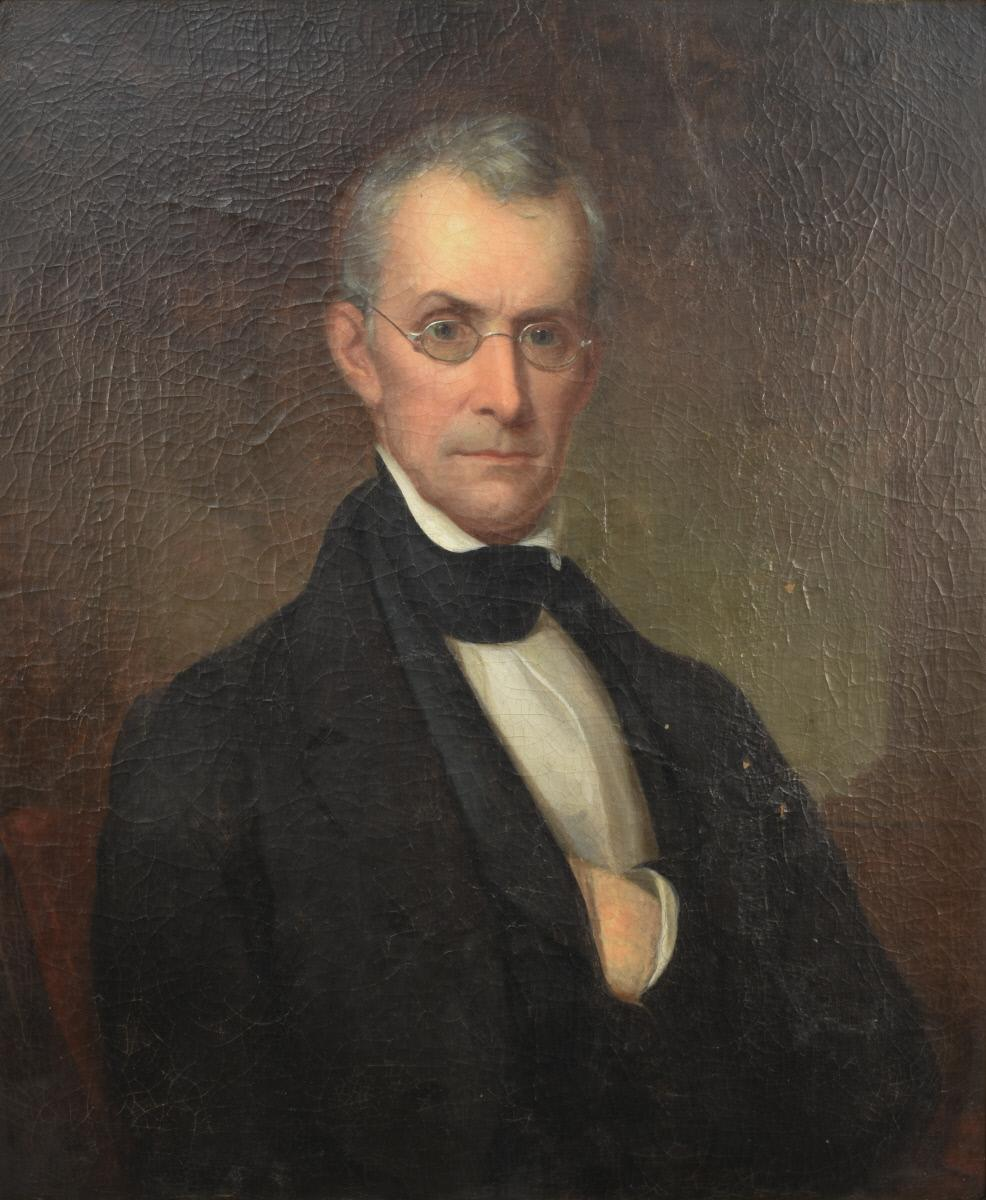
- Born: 29 March 1787; Pittsburgh, Pennsylvania, US
- Died: 3 March 1863 (aged 75)
- Resting place: Allegheny Cemetery
- Occupations: Lawyer, journalist, politician, historian
- Spouse: Jane Ann Fulton
- Parent(s): Isaac Craig; Amelia Neville Craig

Neville Burgoyne Craig (29 March 1787 – 3 March 1863) was a journalist, politician, historian and lawyer from Pittsburgh, Pennsylvania. He edited the Pittsburgh Gazette newspaper from 1829 to 1841 and served a term in the state legislature.

== Family and early life ==
Craig was born in 1787 in Pittsburgh's Fort Pitt Blockhouse, where resided his father Isaac Craig and mother Amelia Neville Craig, daughter of General John Neville. He attended the Pittsburgh Academy, now known as the University of Pittsburgh, and then Princeton, from which he was expelled for participating in a student riot. He went on to study law under Judge Alexander Addison and was admitted to the bar in 1810. After marrying Jane Ann Fulton, he took leave of the legal profession, taking charge of a store at New Lisbon, Ohio, where he remained for three or four years. In the 1820s, back in Pittsburgh, he worked in local government as Deputy Attorney General for Allegheny County, Solicitor of the City of Pittsburgh, and the city's Clerk of Select Council.

== Journalism ==
Taking an interest in political discourse, Craig began to write for the Pittsburgh Gazette. In 1829 he purchased the paper, serving as proprietor until 1840 and editor until 1841. He oversaw a boom in circulation and introduced a daily edition, the city's first. In an era rife with the exchange of verbal abuse between rival newspapermen, Craig's vitriolic pen showed no mercy to his journalistic opponents, which were many, including at one time or another almost every newspaper editor in Pittsburgh. Politically, Craig led the Gazette in support of the Anti-Masonic Party. The prolonged life of that party in Allegheny County may have owed something to his persistent advocacy. Craig sympathized strongly with the antislavery and temperance movements. He set a lasting precedent for the Gazette in refusing to print runaway slave notices.

== Politics ==
In 1842, the year following his departure from the Gazette, Craig was elected to the Pennsylvania House of Representatives on an "Anti-Masonic–Whig" fusion ticket. He served a one-year term in 1843. In an 1843 election for US Representative, the sides of the faltering Anti-Masonic–Whig alliance fielded separate candidates: the Anti-Mason Craig and the Whig Henry Marie Brackenridge. Although Craig outpolled Brackenridge, both lost badly to Democrat William Wilkins. Craig tried again for a US House seat as the candidate of the anti-slavery Liberty (1844) and Free Soil (1852) parties, but captured only a few percent of the vote each time. He similarly unsuccessfully ran for Mayor of Pittsburgh in 1849 and 1854 under the Free Soil banner.

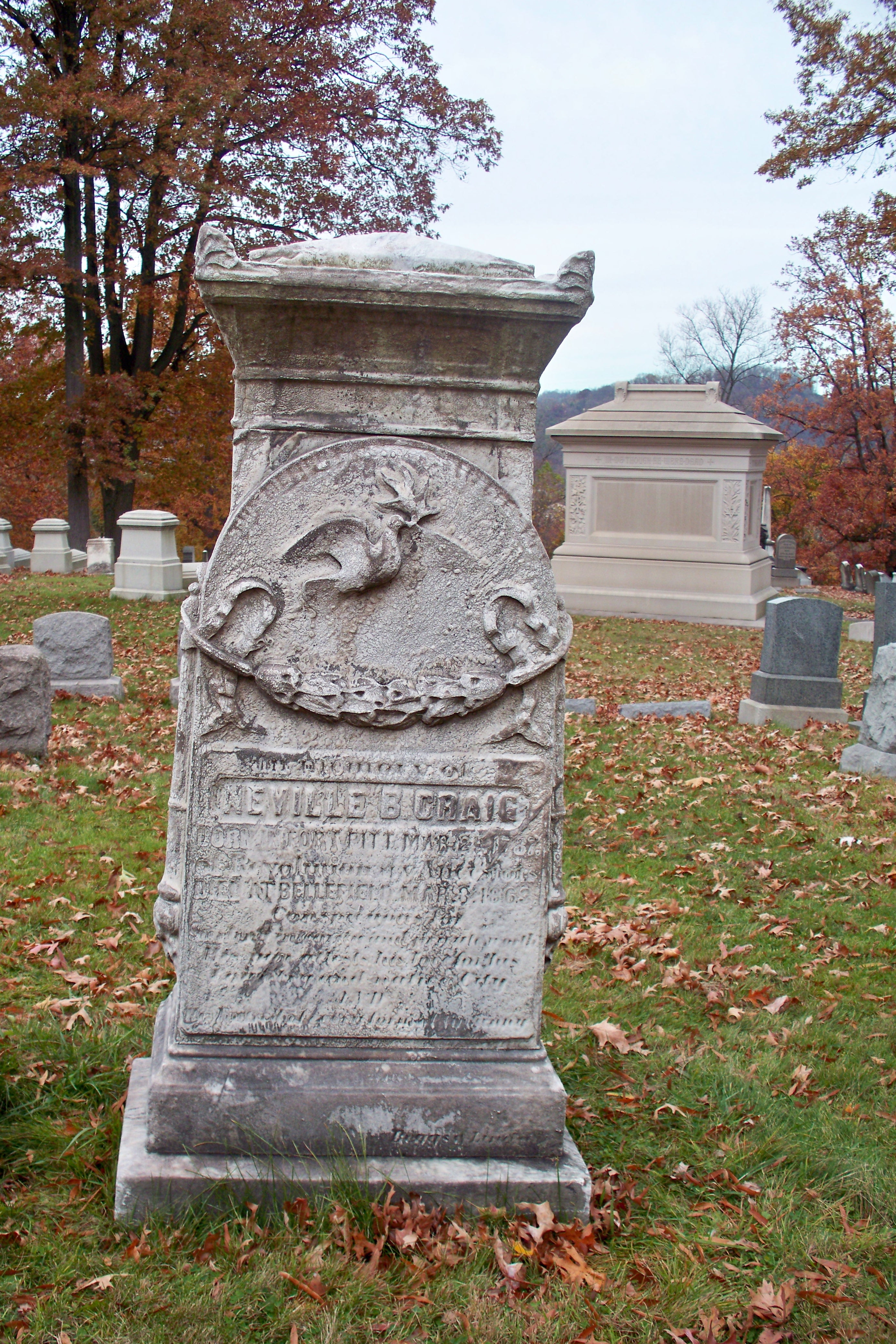
Craig's grave in Allegheny Cemetery

== Historical work ==
For two years starting on 1 January 1845, Craig published a monthly historical journal called the Olden Time. It was held in high value by historians, as was his 1851 book History of Pittsburgh. In 1854 he published his Memoirs of Major Robert Stobo, on which is based Sir Gilbert Parker's The Seats of the Mighty. In the same year, in honor of his father, he wrote the Sketch of the Life and Services of Major Isaac Craig. Other works are Exposure of a Few of the Many Misstatements in H. M. Brackenridge's History of the Whiskey Insurrection and Registeres des Baptismes et Sepultures qui se sont fait au Fort Du Quesne, both published in 1859.

== Late life and death ==
After the death of his wife, with whom he had ten children, Craig resided alternately with his three surviving daughters. He spent his last days with his youngest daughter, at his farm, "Bellefield," in the Oakland part of Pitt Township, now part of Pittsburgh. He died there of bronchial asthma on 3 March 1863. He is buried in Allegheny Cemetery.
