= List of Confederate States Army officers educated at the United States Military Academy =

The first national flag of the Confederate States of America with 13 stars

The United States Military Academy (USMA) is an undergraduate college in West Point, New York, that educates and commissions officers for the United States Army. Confederate President Jefferson Davis, himself a former officer and West Point graduate (class of 1828), preferred West Point trained officers for the Confederate States Army (CSA). This article lists those alumni. Also included are a number of officers who were cadets at West Point but for reason known or unknown never graduated, such as Lewis Armistead. There are several (indicated) familial relations between the officers, e.g. between members of the Lee family of Virginia. Other notable Confederate officers include James Longstreet (class of 1842), Stonewall Jackson (class of 1846), and J.E.B. Stuart (class of 1854).

== List ==
Note: "Class year" refers to the class year of the individual alumnus, which usually is the same year he graduated. In times of war classes often graduate early.
Note: A "-" before a class year in brackets means that the individual alumnus was part of this class, but did not graduate.
Note: Alumni who graduated in the same class are listed according to class rank, highest to lowest, with non-graduates listed alphabetically at the end.

Name	Class year	Notability	References
Louis Gustave De Russy	1814	Major USA, Colonel USV, Major General of Louisiana Militia, Colonel CSA; War of 1812 and Mexican–American War; namesake for 3 forts, oldest West Point graduate in the Confederate States Army	
William Henry Chase	1815	Major USA, Major General of Florida Militia; served as civil and military engineer	
Samuel Cooper	1815	Colonel USA, General CSA; 2nd Seminole War and Mexican–American War; Adjutant General of the US Army; Adjutant General and Inspector General of the Confederate States Army	
Richard Bland Lee II	1817	Major USA, Colonel CSA; 2nd Seminole War; served in the Commissary Dept. (both USA and CSA); cousin of Robert E. Lee	
Angus William McDonald	1817	1st Lieutenant USA, Colonel CSA; commander of the 7th Virginia Cavalry	
Edward G.W. Butler	1820	Colonel USA; Major General of Louisiana Militia, Mexican–American War; Confederate rank and service history unclear	
John H. Winder	1820	Major USA, Brigadier General CSA; Mexican–American War; commanded the Confederate Bureau of Prison Camps	
Charles Dimmock	1821	Captain USA, Colonel of Virginia Militia, Captain CSA; Superintendent (USA) of the Virginia State Armory; designed the defences at Petersburg	
Walter Gwynn	1822	1st Lieutenant USA, Brigadier General CSA; civil, fortifications, and railroad engineer	
Isaac R. Trimble	1822	2nd Lieutenant USA, Major General CSA; civil and railroad engineer; wounded and captured at the Battle of Gettysburg	
Alfred Beckley	1823	1st Lieutenant USA, Brigadier General of Virginia Militia, Brigadier General CSA; served in Virginia, resigned in 1862 and afterwards surrendered himself to the Union Army	
Daniel Smith Donelson	1825	2nd Lieutenant USA, Brigadier General of Tennessee Militia, Major General CSA; commanded Department of East Tennessee, died of diarrhea on April 17, 1863	
Benjamin Huger	1825	Major USA, Major General CSA; Mexican–American War; was relieved of field command during the American Civil War and assigned to staff duty	
Albert Sidney Johnston	1826	Brigadier General USA, General CSA; Texas War of Independence, Mexican–American War, Utah War; killed at the Battle of Shiloh, probably by one of his own men	
Edward Brickell White	1826	1st Lieutenant USA, Lieutenant Colonel CSA; civil engineer; commanded the 3rd (Palmetto) South Carolina Light Artillery Btln	
Francis L. Dancy	1826	1st Lieutenant USA, Colonel USV, Colonel CSA; Seminole Wars; citrus grower; served as Quartermaster General of Florida	
John B. Grayson	1826	Major USA, Brigadier General CSA; Mexican–American War; died of tuberculosis and pneumonia on October 21, 1861	
John Archer	1826	1st Lieutenant USA, Captain CSA; planter; appointed to the regular confederate army, served as a staff officer in the Eastern Theater	
James A. J. Bradford	1827	Captain USA, Colonel CSA; commanded the 1st North Carolina Artillery, died of disease on September 7, 1863	
Leonidas Polk	1827	2nd Lieutenant USA, Lieutenant General CSA; commanded a corps in the Western Theater, killed during the Battle of Marietta; uncle of Lucius E. Polk and relative of Marshall T. Polk	
Gabriel J. Rains	1827	Lieutenant Colonel USA, Brigadier General CSA; 2nd Seminole War, Mexican–American War, Yakima War; commanded the Confederate Torpedo Bureau, brother of George Washington Rains	
Pierce B. Anderson	- (1827)	Captain USA, Major CSA; Mexican–American War; resigned from West Point in 1825 after receiving a bayonet wound, served as infantry and artillery officer, killed at the Battle of Allegheny Mountain	
John S. Westcott	- (1827)	Surgeon USV, Major CSA; Second Seminole War; resigned from West Point in 1827 due to illness; commanded Confederate forces at the Battle of Fort Brooke	
Hugh W. Mercer	1828	1st Lieutenant USA, Brigadier General CSA; commanded the District of Georgia, pressed slaves and free blacks into confederate service	
Joseph L. Locke	1828	1st Lieutenant USA, Major CSA; served in the Commissary Dept.	
Thomas F. Drayton	1828	1st Lieutenant USA, Brigadier General CSA; railroad engineer; fought against his brother Percival Drayton at the Battle of Port Royal	
Robert E. Lee	1829	Colonel USA, General CSA; graduated second in his class, without demerits; commanded the Army of Northern Virginia (1862–1865); General-in-Chief, Confederate States Army (1865); father of G.W.C. Lee, uncle of Fitzhugh Lee	
Joseph E. Johnston	1829	Brigadier General USA, General CSA; Mexican–American War, Seminole Wars; highest-ranking U.S. Army officer to resign and join the Confederate States of America	
Albert G. Blanchard	1829	Major USA, Brigadier General CSA; Mexican–American War	
Theophilus H. Holmes	1829	Major USA, Lieutenant General CSA; commanded coastal defenses and military districts during most of the American Civil War	
Benjamin G. Humphreys	- (1829)	Brigadier General CSA; expelled from West Point for his role in the Eggnog Riot; Senator & Governor of Mississippi; commanded an infantry brigade in the Army of Northern Virginia	
William N. Pendleton	1830	2nd Lieutenant USA, Brigadier General CSA; educator and Episcopal priest; served as Robert E. Lee's Chief of Artillery during most of the American Civil War	
John B. Magruder	1830	Major USA, Major General CSA, Major General in Imperial Mexican Army; 2nd Seminole War and Mexican–American War; noted for his deceptive delaying tactics during the Peninsula Campaign; brother of Allan B. Magruder	
Albert Taylor Bledsoe	1830	2nd Lieutenant USA, Colonel CSA; Episcopal priest, university professor; served as Confederate Assistant Secretary of War	
Meriwether Lewis Clark, Sr.	1830	2nd Lieutenant USA, Major USV, Brigadier General of Missouri State Guard, Colonel CSA; Mexican–American War; architect; served in the Eastern and Western Theaters	
Lloyd J. Beall	1830	Major USA, Colonel CSA; Black Hawk War, 2nd Seminole War and Mexican–American War; served as the only Colonel-Commandant of the Confederate States Marine Corps	
William C. Heyward	1830	2nd Lieutenant USA, Colonel CSA; his plantation was destroyed during the Raid at Combahee Ferry, commanded the 11th South Carolina Infantry	
Albert Miller Lea	1831	2nd Lieutenant USA, Brigadier General of Iowas Militia, Lieutenant Colonel CSA; Chief Clerk & Acting U.S. Secretary of War; served as an engineer in the Trans-Mississippi Dept.	
Lucius B. Northrop	1831	Captain USA, Colonel CSA, Brigadier General CSA (unconfirmed); 2nd Seminole War; served as the confederate Chief Commissary General of Subsistence	
James S. Williams	1831	1st Lieutenant USA, Colonel CSA; Black Hawk War; civil engineer; served as an engineer in the Trans-Mississippi Dept.	
Montford S. Stokes	- (1831)	Midshipman USN, Major USV, Colonel CSA; left West Point in 1828; Mexican–American War; commanded the 1st North Carolina Infantry, mortally wounded at the Battle of Beaver Dam Creek	
Benjamin S. Ewell	1832	2nd Lieutenant USA, Colonel CSA; college professor and civil engineer; commanded the 32nd Virginia Infantry, served as staff officer, brother of Richard Stoddert Ewell	
Philip St. George Cocke	1832	2nd Lieutenant USA, Brigadier General CSA; shot himself on December 26, 1861	
Richard G. Fain	1832	2nd Lieutenant USA, Brigadier General of Tennessee Militia, Colonel CSA; raised the 63rd Tennessee Infantry	
Tench Tilghman	1832	2nd Lieutenant USA, Major General of Maryland Militia; Black Hawk War	
George B. Crittenden	1832	Lieutenant Colonel USA, Major General CSA; Black Hawk War, Army of the Republic of Texas, Mexican–American War; reduced in rank from Major General to Colonel in October 1862	
Robert H. Archer	1832	2nd Lieutenant USA; Seminole Wars; probably mixed up with Robert Harris Archer	
Richard C. Gatlin	1832	Major USA, Colonel USV, Brigadier General CSA; 2nd Seminole War, Mexican–American War and Utah War; served as Adjutant General and Inspector General of North Carolina	
Humphrey Marshall	1832	2nd Lieutenant USA, Colonel USV, Brigadier General CSA; Black Hawk War, Mexican–American War and Utah War; U.S. Representative from Kentucky (1849–1852), (1855–1859); resigned from the Confederate Army in June 1863, member of Second Confederate Congress	
William G. Bonner	- (1832)	Major CSA; left West Point in 1831; served as Chief Engineer to his classmate Gen. Humphrey Marshall	
Francis Henney Smith	1833	2nd Lieutenant USA, Major General of Virginia Militia, Colonel CSA; was Superintendent of the Virginia Military Institute from 1839 to 1889	
David Bullock Harris	1833	2nd Lieutenant USA, Colonel CSA; farmer; served as engineer on Beauregard's staff	
Roswell W. Lee	1833	1st Lieutenant USA, Lieutenant in the Army of the Republic of Texas, Colonel CSA; Indian Wars; commanded Indian units	
J. Lucius Davis	1833	2nd Lieutenant USA, Lieutenant Colonel of Virginia Militia, Colonel CSA; commanded the 10th Virginia Cavalry	
Abraham C. Myers	1833	Captain USA, Colonel CSA; 2nd Seminole War and Mexican–American War; serves as the confederate Quartermaster-General	
Daniel Ruggles	1833	Captain USA, Brigadier General CSA; 2nd Seminole War and Mexican–American War; noted for his service at the Battle of Shiloh	
Benjamin Eusebius Du Bose	1833	2nd Lieutenant USA; service history unknown	
Thomas H. Williamson	- (1833)	Brig. Gen. of Virginia Militia, Colonel CSA; was found deficient in 1830; taught at the VMI; served as Chief Engineer to Beauregard and Jackson	
Robert T. P. Allen	1834	2nd Lieutenant USA, Colonel of Kentucky Militia, Colonel CSA; 2nd Seminole War; found the Kentucky Military Institute; commanded the 4th and the 17th Texas Infantry	
William T. Stockton	1834	2nd Lieutenant USA, Colonel of Florida Militia, Lieutenant Colonel CSA; 2nd Seminole War; served in the 1st Florida Cavalry, captured at the Battle of Missionary Ridge	
Charles A. Fuller	1834	1st Lieutenant USA, Colonel of Kentucky Militia, Colonel CSA; 2nd Seminole War; served as an artillery officer	
James Fairlie Cooper	1834	2nd Lieutenant USA, Lieutenant Colonel CSA; served in the 7th Georgia Infantry, resigned in 1861	
Thomas O. Barnwell	1834	2nd Lieutenant USA; service history unknown	
Goode Bryan	1834	Major USA, Brigadier General CSA; Mexican–American War; served in several prominent Civil War battles, including the Battle of the Wilderness	
Allan B. Magruder	- (1834)	Colonel CSA; dismissed from West Point in 1831; served in the Commissary Dept., brother of John B. Magruder	
William H. Griffin	1835	2nd Lieutenant USA, Colonel CSA; civil engineer; commanded Griffin's Battalion of Texas Infantry, later commanded the 21st Texas Infantry	
Peter C. Gaillard	1835	2nd Lieutenant USA, Colonel of South Carolina Militia, Colonel CSA; Seminole Wars; commanded the 27th South Carolina Infantry	
James M. Wells	1835	Captain USA, Major USV, Colonel CSA; 2nd Seminole War and Mexican–American War; commanded the 23rd Mississippi Infantry	
Jones M. Withers	1835	Colonel USV, Colonel USA, Colonel of Alabama Militia, Major General CSA; Indian Wars and Mexican–American War	
Larkin Smith	1835	Captain USA, Lieutenant Colonel CSA; Aroostook War, 2nd Seminole War and Mexican–American War; served as Assistant Quartermaster General and head of the Tax-in-kind Bureau	
Hugh McLeod	1835	2nd Lieutenant USA, Brigadier General of Texas Militia, Colonel CSA; Indian Wars and Mexican–American War; commanded the 1st Texas Infantry, died of pneumonia on January 2, 1862	
Danville Leadbetter	1836	Captain USA, Colonel of Alabama Militia, Brigadier General CSA; served as an engineer in the Western Theater	
Joseph R. Anderson	1836	2nd Lieutenant USA, Brigadier General CSA; Superintendent of the Tredegar Iron Works	
Christopher Q. Tompkins	1836	Captain USA, Lieutenant Colonel of Virginia Militia, Colonel CSA; 2nd Seminole War and Mexican–American War; iron manufacturer; commanded the 22nd Virginia Infantry, relinquished field command and transferred to the Ordnance Dept. in 1862	
Lloyd Tilghman	1836	Captain USA, Brigadier General CSA; captured then released at the Battle of Fort Henry; killed at the Battle of Champion Hill	
Braxton Bragg	1837	Lieutenant Colonel USA, General CSA; 2nd Seminole War, Mexican–American War; a principal commander in the Western Theater of the American Civil War; Fort Bragg is named after him	
William W. Mackall	1837	Captain USA, Lieutenant Colonel USA (declined), Brigadier General CSA; 2nd Seminole War and Mexican–American War; served as Chief of Staff of the Army of Tennessee several times	
Robert T. Jones	1837	1st Lieutenant USA, Captain of Alabama Militia, Colonel CSA; Indian Wars; commanded the 12th Alabama Infantry, killed at the Battle of Seven Pines	
Jubal Anderson Early	1837	Major USA, Lieutenant General CSA; Seminole Wars, Mexican–American War; never surrendered, escaping to Mexico and Canada until pardoned in 1868; established the Lost Cause point of view by writing articles for the Southern Historical Society in the 1870s	
Edmund Bradford	1837	1st Lieutenant USA, Major CSA; 2nd Seminole War and Mexican–American War; served as an Inspector General and Quartermaster General	
John C. Pemberton	1837	Major USA, Lieutenant General CSA; Seminole Wars and Mexican–American War; defeated at the Siege of Vicksburg	
Arthur M. Rutledge	1837	2nd Lieutenant USA, Major CSA; 2nd Seminole War; served as an artillery officer	
Arnold Elzey (Jones)	1837	Captain USA, Major General CSA; Indian Wars and Mexican–American War; was promoted to Brigadier General on the battlefield of Manassas by Jefferson Davis	
William H.T. Walker	1837	Major USA, Major General of Georgia Militia, Major General CSA; 2nd Seminole War and Mexican–American War; Commandant of Cadets at West Point; killed at the Battle of Atlanta	
Robert H. Chilton	1837	Major USA, Brigadier General CSA; Indian Wars and Mexican–American War; served as Inspector General and Chief of Staff to Robert E. Lee for most of the war	
P.G.T. Beauregard	1838	Major USA, General CSA; military engineer; ordered the firing of shots at Fort Sumter, South Carolina, that started the Civil War	
James H. Trapier	1838	1st Lieutenant USA, Colonel of South Carolina Militia, Brigadier General CSA; Mexican–American War; served in the Western Theater and in South Carolina	
William B. Blair	1838	Captain USA, Colonel of Virginia Militia, Major CSA; Mexican–American War; served in the Commissary Dept.	
Henry C. Wayne	1838	Captain USA, Major General of Georgia Militia, Brigadier General CSA (declined); Mexican–American War; commanded the United States Camel Corps; served as Adjutant General of Georgia	
Milton A. Haynes	1838	2nd Lieutenant USA, Captain USV, Lieutenant Colonel CSA; Indian Wars and Mexican–American War; served as an artillery officer	
William J. Hardee	1838	Lieutenant Colonel USA, Lieutenant General CSA; 2nd Seminole War, Mexican–American War; noted military tactician; fought in several battles during the American Civil War	
Henry Hopkins Sibley	1838	Major USA, Major General CSA; 2nd Seminole War, Mexican–American War, Utah War; leader of the failed New Mexico Campaign; court martialed and censured in 1863	
Edward Johnson	1838	Major USA, Major General CSA; Mexican–American War, Seminole Wars, Utah War; captured twice during the American Civil War	
Alexander W. Reynolds	1838	Captain USA, Brigadier General CSA; 2nd Seminole War and Mexican–American War; served in the Western Theater	
Carter L. Stevenson	1838	Captain USA, Major General CSA; 2nd Seminole War, Mexican–American War, Third Seminole War, Utah War; served mostly in the Western Theater	
St. John R. Liddell	- (1838)	Brigadier General CSA; left West Point in 1835; commanded an infantry brigade and later a division in the Western Theater and the Trans-Mississippi Dept.	
Jeremy F. Gilmer	1839	Captain USA, Major General CSA; Mexican–American War; served as the Chief Engineer of the Confedereate States Army	
Alexander Lawton	1839	2nd Lieutenant USA, Brigadier General CSA; graduated from Harvard Law School (class of 1842); seriously wounded at the Battle of Antietam in September 1862 and served as the Confederacy's second Quartermaster General for the remainder of the war; served as U.S. minister to Austria-Hungary	
Charles Wickliffe	1839	Major USA, Colonel CSA; Mexican–American War; commanded the 7th Kentucky Mounted Infantry, mortally wounded at the Battle of Shiloh	
Lewis Addison Armistead	- (1839)	Captain USA, Brigadier General CSA; Mexican–American War and Indian Wars; class of 1837, resigned in 1833, rejoined class of 1838 next year, found deficient and turned back into class of 1839 in 1835, resigned in 1836 facing dismissal for allegedly breaking a plate over the head of fellow cadet Jubal Early, later commissioned in the Regular Army; killed while leading a brigade at Gettysburg; brother of Frank S. Armistead	
Paul Octave Hébert	1840	Lieutenant Colonel USA, Brigadier General CSA; graduated first in his class, Mexican–American War; Governor of Louisiana (1853–1856); served at the Siege of Vicksburg and in Texas; cousin to Louis Hébert	
William H. Gilham	1840	1st Lieutenant USA, Major of Virginia Militia, Colonel CSA; 2nd Seminole War and Mexican–American War; Commandant of Cadets at the VMI, author of "Manual of Instruction for the Volunteers and Militia of the United States"	
John P. McCown	1840	Captain USA, Major General CSA; Seminole Wars, Mexican–American War and Utah War; served in the Western Theater during the Civil War; court-martialled by General Braxton Bragg for disobedience of orders in March 1863 and suspended from duty for six months; subsequently served in North Carolina	
Richard S. Ewell	1840	Captain USA, Lieutenant General CSA; performed escort duty along the Santa Fe Trail and Oregon Trail, Mexican–American War; left leg was amputated after the Second Battle of Bull Run, served in numerous battles in the East, brother of Benjamin Stoddert Ewell	
James Green Martin	1840	Captain USA, Major General of North Carolina Militia, Brigadier General CSA; Aroostock War, Mexican–American War and Utah War; served as Adjutant General of North Carolina and afterwards in the East	
Bushrod Johnson	1840	1st Lieutenant USA, Colonel of Tennessee Militia, Major General CSA; 2nd Seminole War and Mexican–American War; served with distinction in many key battles such as the Battle of Chickamauga and Siege of Petersburg	
Reuben P. Campbell	1840	Captain USA, Colonel CSA; 2nd Seminole War, Mexican–American War and Utah War; commanded the 7th North Carolina Infantry, killed at the Battle of Gaines's Mill	
William Steele	1840	Captain USA, Brigadier General CSA; Indian Wars and Mexican–American War and Utah War; served as a cavalry officer in the Trans-Mississippi Dept.	
Robert Plunket Maclay	1840	Captain USA, Major of Louisiana Militia, Brigadier General CSA; Indian Wars, Mexican–American War and Utah War; served in the Trans-Mississippi Dept.	
Thomas Jordan	1840	Captain USA, Brigadier General CSA; 2nd Seminole War and Mexican–American War; operated a pro-Southern spy network in Washington, D.C., prior to the American Civil War and turned control of it over to Rose O'Neal Greenhow after the war began; served as staff officer in the Western Theater and in the defense of Charleston; afterwards served as General-in-Chief of the Cuban Liberation Army	
Marcellus A. Stovall	- (1840)	Colonel of Georgia Militia, Brigadier General CSA; resigned from West Point in 1837 due to poor health; 2nd Seminole War; served as artillery and infantry commander in the Southern & Western Theaters and the Trans-Mississippi Dept.	
Smith Stansbury	1841	2nd Lieutenant USA, Major CSA; clerk; served in the Ordnance Dept., died because of sickness on April 26, 1864	
Josiah Gorgas	1841	Captain USA, Brigadier General CSA; Mexican–American War; served as confederate Chief of Ordnance	
Sewall L. Fremont	1841	Captain USA, Colonel of North Carolina Militia, Lieutenant Colonel CSA; Seminole Wars and Mexican–American War; civil and military engineer	
Samuel S. Anderson	1841	Captain USA, Colonel CSA; Mexican–American War and Third Seminole War; served as Adjutant General to Huger, Kirby Smith and Taylor	
Samuel Jones	1841	Captain USA, Major General CSA; defended the Virginia and Tennessee Railroad and vital salt mines, commanded Department of Florida and South Georgia	
Robert S. Garnett	1841	Major USA, Brigadier General CSA; Mexican–American War and Indian Wars; Commandant of Cadets at West Point (1852–1854); first general officer killed in the American Civil War; cousin of Richard B. Garnett	
Richard B. Garnett	1841	Captain USA, Brigadier General CSA; Mexican–American War, Indian Wars and Utah War; killed during Pickett's Charge at the Battle of Gettysburg; cousin of Robert S. Garnett	
Claudius W. Sears	1841	2nd Lieutenant USA, Brigadier General CSA; Seminole Wars; served in the Eastern Theater in 1861 and 1862, then served with the Army of Tennessee	
John M. Jones	1841	Captain USA, Brigadier General CSA; Utah War; Second Battle of Bull Run, Battle of Fredericksburg, Battle of Chancellorsville, Battle of Gettysburg, killed at Battle of the Wilderness	
Edward Murray	1841	Captain USA, Lieutenant Colonel CSA; Seminole Wars and Mexican–American War; served with the 49th Virginia Infantry	
Abraham Buford	1841	Captain USA, Brigadier General CSA; Mexican–American War; performed escort duty along the Santa Fe Trail; commanded cavalry brigades and divisions in the Western Theater	
George Washington Rains	1842	Captain USA, Brigadier General of Georgia Militia, Colonel CSA; Mexican–American War; managed iron works; established the Confederate Powderworks, brother of Gabriel J. Rains	
Gustavus Woodson Smith	1842	Captain USA, Major General CSA; Mexican–American War; engineer; streets commissioner of New York City (1858–1861); temporary commander of the Army of Northern Virginia prior to Robert E. Lee taking command	
Mansfield Lovell	1842	1st Lieutenant USA, Major General CSA; Mexican–American War; participated in planning a filibuster expedition to Cuba in 1853/1854; commanded New Orleans until it was captured, afterwards served in the Western Theater and in Georgia	
Alexander P. Stewart	1842	2nd Lieutenant USA, Major of Tennessee Militia, Lieutenant General CSA; college professor; one of the most dependable commanders in the West, commanded the (division sized) remnants of the Army of Tennessee in 1865	
Martin L. Smith	1842	Captain USA, Major General CSA; civil and military engineer, planned defences and commanded a division at Vicksburg, served as Chief Engineer of the ANV and the AoT	
Daniel Harvey Hill	1842	1st Lieutenant USA, Lieutenant General CSA; Mexican–American War; served in numerous battles in the Eastern and Western Theaters, later was sidelined because of his cantankerous personality and his outspoken quarrels by President Davis	
Armistead T. M. Rust	1842	2nd Lieutenant USA, Colonel CSA; performed escort duty along the Santa Fe Trail; commanded the 19th Virginia Infantry	
Richard H. Anderson	1842	Captain USA, Lieutenant General CSA; Mexican–American War and Utah War; served in the Army of Northern Virginia, wounded at the Battle of Antietam	
George W. Lay	1842	Captain USA, Lieutenant Colonel CSA; Mexican–American War; served as Adjutant General and Inspector General for Bonham and Joe Johnston, later served in the Bureau of Conscription	
Eugene E. McLean	1842	Captain USA, Lieutenant Colonel CSA; Mexican–American War; served as Quartermaster General for A.S. Johnston, Joe Johnston, Bragg and P.G.T. Beauregard	
Lafayette McLaws	1842	Captain USA, Major General CSA; Mexican–American War and Utah War; inconsistent performance as a combat leader led court-martial, but the verdict was overturned	
Earl Van Dorn	1842	Major USA, Major General CSA; Mexican–American War and Indian Wars; defeated at the Battle of Pea Ridge and Second Battle of Corinth; murdered on May 7, 1863	
James Longstreet	1842	Major USA, Lieutenant General CSA; Mexican–American War; ambassador to the Ottoman Empire (1897–1904); served in the ANV and in Tennessee, Senior Lieutenant General of the Confederacy	
James M. Goggin	- (1842)	1st Lieutenant in the Army of the Republic of Texas, Major CSA, Brigadier General CSA (Special); left West Point in 1839; served as Adjutant General in the ANV, temporary commanded a brigade in Kershaw's division	
Roswell S. Ripley	1843	Major USA, Brigadier General CSA; Mexican–American War, Seminole Wars; fought in many battles with the Army of Northern Virginia, severely wounded at the Battle of Antietam, also served as a commander of coastal defenses	
Samuel G. French	1843	Captain USA, Major General CSA; Mexican–American War; served as division commander in the Eastern and Western Theaters	
Franklin Gardner	1843	Captain USA, Major General CSA; Mexican–American War, Indian Wars and Utah War; served in the cavalry until 1862, known for his masterful defence of Port Hudson	
Edmunds B. Holloway	1843	Captain USA, Colonel CSA; Mexican–American War; commanded the 1st Missouri State Guard Infantry, was accidentally shot by his own men on May 16, 1861	
Daniel M. Frost	1844	1st Lieutenant USA, Brigadier General of Missouri Militia, Brigadier General CSA; Mexican–American War and Indian Wars; when his family fled to Canada in 1863 he deserted and joined them	
Francis J. Thomas	1844	1st Lieutenant USA, Colonel CSA; Mexican–American War and Indian Wars; original commander of the 1st Maryland Infantry, relieved, killed at the First Battle of Bull Run while serving as Johnston's Chief of Ordnance	
Simon Bolivar Buckner	1844	Captain USA, Lieutenant General CSA; Mexican–American War; Battle of Fort Donelson, Battle of Perryville, Battle of Chickamauga, captured and released in a prisoner exchange; Governor of Kentucky (1887–1891)	
William H.C. Whiting	1845	Captain USA, Major General CSA; graduated first in his class; commanded a division in the ANV, later served in North Carolina, died because of dysentery on March 10, 1865	
Louis Hébert	1845	2nd Lieutenant USA, Colonel of Louisiana Militia, Brigadier General CSA; Chief Engineer of Louisiana and North Carolina, served in the Western Theater; cousin of Paul Octave Hébert	
Thomas G. Rhett	1845	Major USA, Brigadier General of South Carolina Militia, Colonel CSA; served on Joe Johnston's staff, later served as Chief of Artillery of the Trans-Mississippi Dept.; became a Colonel in the Egyptian Army	
Edmund Kirby Smith	1845	Major USA, General CSA; Mexican–American War and Indian Wars; commander of the Trans-Mississippi Department	
James Morrison Hawes	1845	Captain USA, Brigadier General CSA; Mexican–American War and Utah War; Chief of Cavalry for A.S. Johnston until the Battle of Shiloh, afterwards served with infantry and cavalry in the Western Theater and the Trans-Mississippi Dept.	
Richard C. W. Radford	1845	Captain USA, Colonel CSA; Mexican–American War and Indian Wars; commanded the 2nd Virginia Cavalry, probably sidelined because J.E.B. Stuart, resigned in 1862, later commanded the 1st Regiment Virginia State Line	
Barnard E. Bee	1845	Captain USA, Lieutenant Colonel of Utah Militia, Brigadier General CSA; Mexican–American War and Utah War; killed at the First Battle of Bull Run, brother of fellow confederate General Hamilton P. Bee	
John A. Brown	1846	Captain USA, Lieutenant Colonel CSA; Mexican–American War and Seminole Wars; served as Chief of Artillery to E. Kirby Smith and classmate Dabney H. Maury	
Thomas J. Jackson	1846	Major USA, Lieutenant General CSA; Mexican–American War; professor of natural and experimental philosophy and artillery at Virginia Military Institute (1851–1861); excelled in several battles during the American Civil War, including the First Battle of Bull Run where he received his nickname; accidentally shot and mortally wounded by his own troops at the Battle of Chancellorsville	
John Adams	1846	Captain USA, Colonel of Minnesota Militia, Brigadier General CSA; Mexican–American War and Indian Wars; served in the cavalry, shot and killed by nine bullets at the Second Battle of Franklin	
William Duncan Smith	1846	Captain USA, Brigadier General CSA; Mexican–American War and Utah War; served in Georgia and South Carolina, died of yellow fewer on October 4, 1862	
Dabney H. Maury	1846	Lieutenant Colonel USA, Major General CSA; Mexican–American War, cavalry officer in Oregon and Texas; Battle of Pea Ridge, Battle of Corinth, Siege of Vicksburg; United States Ambassador to Colombia (1887–1889)	
David R. Jones	1846	1st Lieutenant USA, Major General CSA; Mexican–American War; served in the Army of Northern Virginia, died of heart failure on January 15, 1863; cousin to fellow confederate Richard Taylor and Jefferson Davis	
Cadmus M. Wilcox	1846	Captain USA, Major General CSA; Mexican–American War; Seven Days Battles, Battle of Gettysburg; federal railroad chief after the American Civil War	
William M. Gardner	1846	Captain USA, Brigadier General CSA; Mexican–American War; served in the Eastern Theater, later served in the Bureau of Prisons	
Samuel B. Maxey	1846	1st Lieutenant USA, Major General CSA; Mexican–American War; Battle of Shiloh, Siege of Port Hudson; United States Senator from Texas (1875–1887)	
George Pickett	1846	Major USA, Major General CSA; Mexican–American War; Pig War; gained national notoriety during Mexican–American War for bravery at Battle of Chapultepec; best known for his division's ill-fated charge at Battle of Gettysburg best known as Pickett's Charge; cousin to fellow confederate officer Robert Johnston	
Birkett D. Fry	- (1846)	1st Lieutenant USA, General in William Walker's Army, Brigadier General CSA; Mexican–American War and Walker's War in Nicaragua; dropped out of West Point in 1844 when he failed in mathematics; served in the Eastern Theater	
Daniel M. Beltzhoover	1847	1st Lieutenant USA, Lieutenant Colonel CSA; Mexican–American War; served in the staff of Twiggs in 1861, afterwards served as artillery and brigade commander in the Western Theater and the Trans-Mississippi Dept.	
Ambrose Powell Hill	1847	1st Lieutenant USA, Lieutenant General CSA; Mexican–American War, Seminole Wars; rose to corps commander in the Army of Northern Virginia by war's end; was killed at Petersburg just seven days before Lee's surrender at Appomattox Court House	
Edward D. Blake	1847	Captain USA, Lieutenant Colonel CSA; Mexican–American War; served as Inspector General to Leonidas Polk and Hardee	
Henry Heth	1847	Captain USA, Major General CSA; Mexican–American War and American Indian Wars; wrote the Army's first marksmanship manual in 1858; was the first confederate commander in contact with Union cavalry at Gettysburg	
Walter H. Stevens	1848	1st Lieutenant USA, Brigadier General CSA; served as an engineer in the Eastern Theater	
William E. Jones	1848	1st Lieutenant USA, Brigadier General CSA; nicknamed "Grumble Jones"; served in the cavalry in the American West until 1857; fought in the largest cavalry engagement of the war, the Battle of Brandy Station, and at the Battle of Gettysburg, killed in action at the Battle of Piedmont	
William G. Gill	1848	1st Lieutenant USA, Colonel CSA; Seminole Wars; originally from New Jersey he served as Chief of Ordnance to Robert E. Lee in 1861, then he was Chief of Ordnance and Artillery to Beauregard, died on June 7, 1862	
Thomas S. Rhett	1848	1st Lieutenant USA, Colonel CSA; Seminole Wars; served as Inspector of the Ordnance Dept. in Richmond	
Edward B. Bryan	1848	2nd Lieutenant USA, Lieutenant Colonel of South Carolina Militia; died on April 28, 1861	
Charles H. Tyler	1848	Captain USA, Lieutenant Colonel CSA; Utah War; served on the staff of Richard Ewell and J.E.B. Stuart, later served with the cavalry in the Western Theater, reputation as a drunkard	
John C. Booth	1848	1st Lieutenant USA, Major CSA, appointed Captain in Regular CSA; Seminole Wars; commanded the Fayetteville Arsenal, died on September 6, 1862	
Thomas K. Jackson	1848	1st Lieutenant USA, Major CSA; Indian Wars; Asst. Instructor of Infantry Tactics at West Point; served as Commissary General to A.S. Johnston and Joe Johnston	
William Beall	1848	Captain USA, Brigadier General CSA; Indian Wars; served with the cavalry and at the Siege of Port Hudson, while a POW he was appointed as supplying agent to the POWs and started to sell cotton in New York City	
William T. Mechling	1848	1st Lieutenant USA, Major CSA; Indian Wars; served as Adjutant General in the Western Theater	
Nathan George Evans	1848	Captain USA, Brigadier General CSA; Indian Wars; nicknamed "Shanks"; noted for his exemplary services during the battles of Bull Run and Ball's Bluff, alleged drunkenness kept him away from field commands from 1863 on	
George H. Steuart	1848	Captain USA, Brigadier General CSA; Indian Wars and Utah War; nicknamed "Maryland Steuart" to distinguish him from J.E.B. Stuart; was a strict disciplinarian and prone to sneaking through his own lines past unwitting sentries in order to test their vigilance, on one occasion was pummeled and beaten by a sentry who later claimed not to have recognized the general, commanded the Maryland units in the ANV	
Johnson K. Duncan	1849	1st Lieutenant USA, Brigadier General CSA; 2nd Seminole War; served in the Western Theater	
John Creed Moore	1849	1st Lieutenant USA, Brigadier General CSA; 2nd Seminole War; served in the Western Theater, resigned in 1864 and was recommissioned a Lieutenant Colonel, commanded various arsenals	
John T. Withers	1849	1st Lieutenant USA, Lieutenant Colonel CSA; served as Assistant Adjutant General of the Confederate States Army in the office next to Gen. Cooper	
Beverly H. Robertson	1849	Captain USA, Brigadier General CSA; American Indian Wars; participated in several battles during the American Civil War, including the Battle of Gettysburg and Battle of Fredericksburg	
Charles W. Field	1849	Captain USA, Major General CSA; American Indian Wars; fought in numerous battles in the Eastern Theater, including the Valley Campaign, Peninsula Campaign, Second Battle of Bull Run, Battle of Cold Harbor and the Siege of Petersburg	
Seth Barton	1849	Lieutenant Colonel USA, Brigadier General CSA; American Indian Wars; Valley Campaign, captured at the Siege of Vicksburg but released in a prisoner exchange, relieved of command after the Battle of Drewry's Bluff	
Duff Cyrus Green	1849	2nd Lieutenant USA, Brigadier General of Alabama Militia; served as Quartermaster General of Alabama	
Thomas Greenhow Williams	1849	1st Lieutenant USA, Lieutenant Colonel CSA; served as Assistant Commissary General of the Confederate States Army and of the State of Virginia	
Thornton A. Washington	1849	1st Lieutenant USA, Lieutenant Colonel CSA; served as Asst. Instructor of Infantry Tactics at West Point; served as Adjutant General to Robert E. Lee	
John W. Frazer	1849	Captain USA, Brigadier General CSA; his promotion to Brigadier was rejected by the Congress in response to his bloodless surrender in the Battle of the Cumberland Gap (1863)	
Alfred Cumming	1849	Captain USA, Brigadier General CSA; Utah War; served in the Eastern and Western Theaters; became a member of the American Military Commission to Korea in 1888	
Samuel H. Reynolds	1849	1st Lieutenant USA, Colonel CSA; commanded the 31st Virginia Infantry until he resigned in December 1861	
James M. McIntosh	1849	Captain USA, Brigadier General CSA; American Indian Wars and Bleeding Kansas; killed at the Battle of Pea Ridge leading McCullock's division after the later was killed himself	
Jacob Culbertson	1850	1st Lieutenant USA, Captain CSA; Professor of Natural and Experimental Philosophy at West Point; served as an artillery officer	
Achilles Bowen	1850	2nd Lieutenant USA, Major CSA; civil and military engineer; served as an engineer on the staff of S.R. Anderson, resigned in 1861	
William T. Magruder	1850	Captain USA, Captain CSA; American Indian Wars; served in the Union Army until October 1862, served as a cavalry officer, killed at the Battle of Gettysburg	
James Persons Flewellen	1850	2nd Lieutenant USA, Major CSA; served as Superintendent of Conscription in Texas	
Lucius M. Walker	1850	2nd Lieutenant USA, Brigadier General CSA; commanded infantry and cavalry in the Western Theater and the Trans-Mississippi Dept., mortally wounded in a duel with fellow confederate general and West Point graduate John S. Marmaduke	
Armistead L. Long	1850	1st Lieutenant USA, Brigadier General CSA; Bleeding Kansas; served as staff officer and artillerist in the Eastern Theater	
Robert Ransom	1850	Captain USA, Major General CSA; American Indian Wars and Bleeding Kansas; Asst. Instructor of Cavalry Tactics at West Point; commanded infantry and cavalry in the Eastern Theater	
Charles Sidney Winder	1850	Captain USA, Brigadier General CSA; American Indian Wars; commanded the Stonewall Brigade, killed at the Battle of Cedar Mountain	
N. Bart Pearce	1850	1st Lieutenant USA, Brigadier General of Arkansas Militia, Major CSA; served as infantry commander and commissary officer in the Trans-Mississippi Dept.	
William Ransom Calhoun	1850	2nd Lieutenant USA, Colonel of South Carolina Militia, Colonel CSA; commanded the 1st South Carolina Artillery Regiment, killed in a duel by fellow officer Alfred Rhett on September 5, 1862; nephew of John C. Calhoun	
Robert Johnston	1850	1st Lieutenant USA, Colonel CSA; Utah War and American Indian Wars; commanded the 3rd Virginia Cavalry, served on the staff of his cousin, Gen. George Pickett	
Thomas Bingham	1850	2nd Lieutenant USA	
William Lewis Cabell	1850	Captain USA, Brigadier General CSA; captured by Union forces during Price's Raid; held as a prisoner of war at Johnson's Island and Fort Warren; a civil engineer and attorney after the war; later elected to four terms as mayor of Dallas, Texas; served four years as a US Marshal	
James H. Wilson	1850	2nd Lieutenant USA, Lieutenant Colonel CSA; served in the 8th Arkansas Infantry Regiment, resigned his post in 1862	
Robert Granderson Cole	1850	1st Lieutenant USA, Lieutenant Colonel CSA; served as Chief Commissary General for the ANV during the war	
Alfred Mouton	1850	Captain USA, Brigadier General of Louisiana Militia, Brigadier General CSA; served in the Western Theater and the Trans-Mississippi Dept., killed at the Battle of Mansfield	
James L. Corley	1850	1st Lieutenant USA, Lieutenant Colonel CSA; Utah War; served as Chie Quartermaster General for the ANV during the war	
Donald C. Stith	1850	Captain USA, Colonel CSA; Utah War; served as an Adjutant General and Inspector General on numerous staffs	
Charles DeWitt Anderson	- (1850)	1st Lieutenant USA, Colonel CSA, (Acting) Brigadier General CSA; first Texan appointed to West Point, but resigned in 1848 when he was found deficient in math and French; commanded the 21st Alabama Infantry, surrendered at the Siege of Fort Gaines	
William T. Welcker	1851	1st Lieutenant USA, Major CSA; Yakima War, served on the staff of Gen. Earl van Dorn	
Caleb Huse	1851	1st Lieutenant USA, Colonel of Alabama Militia, Major CSA; Asst. Professor of Chemistry, Mineralogy, and Geology at West Point; served as one of the Confederacy's foremost weapons purchase agents in Europe	
Benjamin Hardin Helm	1851	2nd Lieutenant USA, Colonel of Kentucky Militia, Brigadier General CSA; commanded the famous Kentucky Orphan Brigade, killed at the Battle of Chickamauga; brother-in-law of Abraham Lincoln	
Junius Daniel	1851	2nd Lieutenant USA, Brigadier General CSA; served in the Battle of Gettysburg, killed in action at the Battle of Spotsylvania Court House	
Melancthon Smith	1851	2nd Lieutenant USA, Colonel CSA; commanded corps artillery in the Western Theater	
Edward A. Palfrey	1851	1st Lieutenant USA, Colonel of Louisiana Militia, Lieutenant Colonel CSA; served as assistant to Gen. Cooper at Richmond	
John Thomas Shaaff	1851	1st Lieutenant USA, Captain CSA; served as Commissary General to Gen. Villepigue	
Laurence S. Baker	1851	1st Lieutenant USA, Brigadier General CSA; served as a cavalry officer, served in North Carolina after getting wounded at the Battle of Gettysburg	
Joseph C. Ives	1852	1st Lieutenant USA, Colonel CSA; served as engineer on the staff of R.E. Lee in South Carolina, later on the staffs of John C. Pemberton and President Davis	
George B. Anderson	1852	1st Lieutenant USA, Brigadier General CSA; served in the Eastern Theater, mortally wounded at the Battle of Antietam	
Henry de Veuve	1852	2nd Lieutenant USA, Captain CSA; served as engineer on the staff of Loring	
George B. Cosby	1852	Captain USA, Brigadier General CSA; American Indian Wars; served as staff officer and cavalry command in the Western Theater	
Robert B. Thomas	1852	1st Lieutenant USA, Brigadier General of Florida Militia, Colonel CSA; Seminole Wars; served as staff officer and on prison duty	
Matthew L. Davis	1852	1st Lieutenant USA, Colonel CSA; American Indian Wars; serves as staff officer, commanded the 2nd North Carolina Cavalry for 11 days when he died on April 23, 1862 of pneumonia while en route to his new command	
John Horace Forney	1852	1st Lieutenant USA, Major General CSA; American Indian Wars and Utah War; served in all theaters; cousin to fellow Confederate generals Robert D. Johnston, Robert Hoke and Stephen D. Ramseur	
Marshall Tate Polk, Jr.	1852	2nd Lieutenant USA, Lieutenant Colonel CSA; American Indian Wars; served as Chief of Artillery for his relative Leonidas Polk; nephew and legal ward of President James K. Polk, relative of fellow Confederate Lucius E. Polk	
Charles H. Rundell	1852	1st Lieutenant USA, Major CSA; American Indian Wars; served on the staff of Gabriel J. Rains, later worked with torpedoes in Texas	
Philip Stockton	1852	1st Lieutenant USA, Colonel CSA; American Indian Wars and Bleeding Kansas; served as staff officer in the Western Theater and the Trans-Mississippi Dept.	
Arthur P. Bagby	1852	2nd Lieutenant USA, Colonel CSA, Major General CSA (unconfirmed); served in the Trans-Mississippi Dept, promotions to Brigadier General and Major General by E. Kirby Smith were unconfirmed, boarded and captured the USS Harriet Lane during the Battle of Galveston	
Richard Vanderhorst Bonneau	1852	2nd Lieutenant USA, Major CSA; American Indian Wars; served in the Commissary Dept.	
St. Clair M. Morgan	- (1852)	Captain CSA; deficient in philosophy and left in 1851, served in the 10th Tennessee Infantry, killed at the Battle of Chickamauga	
William R. Boggs	1853	1st Lieutenant USA, Brigadier General CSA; civil and military engineer; served as Chief Engineer of Georgia and as E.K. Smith's Chief of Staff	
John S. Bowen	1853	2nd Lieutenant USA, Lieutenant Colonel of Georgia Militia, Major General CSA; commanded a division in the Western Theater, died of disease after the Battle of Vicksburg	
James L. White	1853	1st Lieutenant USA, Major CSA; American Indian Wars; served in the 19th South Carolina Infantry	
Benjamin Allston	1853	1st Lieutenant USA, Lieutenant Colonel of South Carolina Militia, Colonel CSA; American Indian Wars; commanded the 4th Alabama Infantry	
John R. Chambliss	1853	2nd Lieutenant USA, Colonel of Virginia Militia, Brigadier General CSA; commanded a cavalry brigade in the Army of Northern Virginia, killed at the Second Battle of Deep Bottom	
Henry B. Davidson	1853	Sergeant USV, Captain USA, Brigadier General CSA; Mexican–American War and American Indian Wars; served as a staff officer and cavalry commander in the Western Theater	
Henry Harrison Walker	1853	1st Lieutenant USA, Brigadier General CSA; Bleeding Kansas; commanded a brigade in the Eastern Theater	
John Bell Hood	1853	1st Lieutenant USA, Lieutenant General CSA, (Temporary) General CSA; American Indian Wars; infantry commander in the Eastern and Western Theaters, famously wounded in battle on multiple occasions, youngest man on either side to lead an army when he took command of the Army of Tennessee at age 33 in 1864	
James A. Smith	1853	1st Lieutenant USA, Brigadier General CSA; American Indian Wars, Bleeding Kansas and Utah War; commanded a division in the Western Theater	
Thomas M. Jones	1853	1st Lieutenant USA, Colonel CSA; served as Commissary General to Bragg, commanded the 27th Mississippi Infantry	
Lucius L. Rich	1853	1st Lieutenant USA, Colonel CSA; American Indian Wars and Utah War; commanded the 1st Missouri Infantry, mortally wounded at the Battle of Shiloh	
Reuben R. Ross	1853	Bvt. 2nd Lieutenant USA, Lieutenant Colonel CSA, (Acting) Brig. Gen. CSA; served as artillery officer and Inspector General in the Western Theater, killed while resisting arrest at Hopkinsville, KY on December 21, 1864	
George Washington Custis Lee	1854	1st Lieutenant USA, Major General CSA; graduated first in his class at West Point; son of Robert E. Lee. Captured at the Battle of Sailor's Creek.	
James Deshler	1854	1st Lieutenant USA, Brigadier General CSA; American Indian Wars and Utah War; commanded a Texan brigade in the Western Theater, killed at the Battle of Chickamauga	
John Pegram	1854	1st Lieutenant USA, Brigadier General CSA; Utah War and American Indian Wars; served as Chief Engineer to Beauregard and Bragg, later commanded cavalry and infantry divisions in the Trans-Mississippi Dept. and the Eastern Theater, killed at the Battle of Hatcher's Run	
Charles G. Rogers	1854	2nd Lieutenant USA, Lieutenant Colonel CSA; served as Inspector General of the Cavalry of the Army of Tennessee	
J.E.B. Stuart	1854	Captain USA, Major General CSA; American Indian Wars; commanded the cavalry of the Army of Northern Virginia	
Archibald Gracie	1854	2nd Lieutenant USA, Captain of Alabama Militia, Brigadier General CSA; American Indian Wars; served as infantry commander in the Western, Southern and Eastern Theaters, killed in the Siege of Petersburg	
Stephen D. Lee	1854	1st Lieutenant USA, Lieutenant General CSA; American Indian Wars; served as artillery officer in the Eastern Theater before he became an infantry commander in the Trans-Mississippi Dept. and the Western and Southern Theaters, youngest Lieutenant General in the Confederate States Army	
William Dorsey Pender	1854	2nd Lieutenant USA, Major General CSA; American Indian Wars, served as artillery officer and infantry commander in the Army of Northern Virginia, mortally wounded at the Battle of Gettysburg	
John Bordenave Villepigue	1854	1st Lieutenant USA, Brigadier General CSA; American Indian Wars; Second Battle of Corinth, died of pneumonia in 1862; his descendant John Canty Villepigue was awarded the Medal of Honor in World War I	
Abner Smead	1854	1st Lieutenant USA, Colonel CSA; John Brown's Raid; served as staff officer to Jackson and Ewell, later served as artillery officer in the Southern Theater	
John O. Long	1854	1st Lieutenant USA, Lieutenant Colonel CSA; served as Adjutant General to Magruder	
John T. Mercer	1854	1st Lieutenant USA, Colonel CSA; commanded the 21st Georgia Infantry Regiment, killed at the Battle of Plymouth	
John B. Mullins	1854	1st Lieutenant USA, Colonel CSA; Bloody Kansas and Utah War; commanded the 19th Mississippi Infantry Regiment	
Horace Randal	1854	1st Lieutenant USA, Colonel CSA, Brigadier General CSA (unconfirmed); American Indian Wars; served as staff officer and cavalry commander in the Southern and Eastern Theaters and in the Trans-Mississippi Dept., killed at the Battle of Jenkins' Ferry	
Peyton H. Colquitt	- (1854)	Colonel CSA; class of 1853, deficient in maths and turned back into the class of 1854, resigned in 1853; served as infantry commander in the Western Theater	
Lawrence B. Haynes	- (1854)	Captain CSA; deficient in French, left in 1851; served on the CSS Governor Moore and in the 1st Louisiana Heavy Artillery	
John V. Jordan	- (1854)	Colonel CSA; deficient and left in 1851; commanded the 31st North Carolina Infantry; probably mixed up with another John v. Jordan	
William Kearney	- (1854)	1st Lieutenant (disputed, rank up to Major) CSA; class of 1853, deficient and turned back into class of 1854, left in 1852; served as a staff officer in the Western Theater	
Lewis H. Kenan	- (1854)	Lieutenant of Georgia Militia, Captain CSA; deficient in 1851; served in the 1st Georgia Regulars	
James G. Montgomery	- (1854)	Captain CSA; deficient and left in 1852; served in the 1st Georgia Regulars	
William R. Robertson	- (1854)	Rank unknown; deficient in maths and left in 1851; service history unknown	
George R. Wilson	- (1854)	Major CSA; deficient in philosophy and chemistry in 1853; served as a staff officer	
Richard Thomas Zarvona	- (1854)	Colonel CSA; resigned from West Point in 1851; served in the Second Italian War of Independence with either the French or the Sardinian Army; seized the Bostoner ship St. Nichols (later CSS Rappahannock) and raided merchant vessels, became a prisoner but was not considered a prisoner of war, paroled and resigned in 1863	
Frederick L. Childs	1855	2nd Lieutenant USA, Lieutenant Colonel CSA; Seminole Wars; Asst. Professor of Geology, History and Ethics at West Point; commanded several Arsenals and served with the 2nd North Carolina Local Defense Troops	
Francis T. Nicholls	1855	2nd Lieutenant USA, Brigadier General CSA; Seminole Wars; a cannon shell severed his foot during the Battle of Chancellorsville in 1863; served two terms as the Governor of Louisiana, served as a member of the West Point Board of Visitors	
Francis A. Shoup	1855	2nd Lieutenant USA, Brigadier General CSA; Seminole Wars; college professor; served in the Western Theater and the Trans-Mississippi Dept., served as infantry and artillery commander and as a staff officer	
John R. Church	1855	2nd Lieutenant USA; American Indian Wars and Utah War; served in the artillery, died on January 9, 1863	
James Hoffman Hill	1855	1st Lieutenant USA, Major CSA; Utah War; served as Adjutant General to Barnard E. Bee and W.H.C. Whiting	
Robert Clinton Hill	1855	2nd Lieutenant USA, Colonel CSA; Seminole Wars and Utah War; commanded the 48th North Carolina Infantry, died on December 4, 1864	
John Logan Black	- (1855)	Colonel CSA; class of 1854, deficient in math and turned back into the class of 1855, left in 1853; commanded the 1st South Carolina Cavalry Regiment	
Allen A. Bursley	- (1855)	Major CSA; class of 1854, deficient in chemistry and turned back into the class of 1855, left in 1854; born in Massachusetts; served as an artillery officer	
Wharton J. Green	- (1855)	Lieutenant Colonel CSA; first cadet admitted from California, class of 1854, deficient in maths and turned back into the class of 1855, resigned in 1851; commanded the 2nd North Carolina Infantry Battalion	
Robert Crooke Wood Jr.	- (1855)	2nd Lieutenant USA, Lieutenant Colonel CSA; class of 1854, ill and turned back into the class of 1855, resigned the same year (1853) and later was directly commissioned; commanded the 1st Mississippi Cavalry	
Charles C. Lee	1856	2nd Lieutenant USA, Colonel CSA; taught at the North Carolina Military Institute; served as infantry commander in the Eastern Theater, was killed at the Battle of Glendale; cousin of Stephen D. Lee	
Hylan B. Lyon	1856	1st Lieutenant USA, Brigadier General CSA; Indian Wars; served in all branches in the Western Theater	
Lunsford L. Lomax	1856	2nd Lieutenant USA, Major General CSA; Indian Wars and Bleeding Kansas; served as staff officer and cavalry commander in the Western and Eastern Theaters	
James P. Major	1856	2nd Lieutenant USA, Brigadier General CSA; Indian Wars; served as artillery officer and cavalry commander in the Western Theater and the Trans-Mississippi Dept.	
George Jackson	1856	1st Lieutenant USA, Colonel CSA; class of 1855, found deficient in engineer studies and turned back into class of 1856; Utah War; served as infantry and cavalry officer in the Eastern Theater; brother of William L. Jackson and cousin of Thomas J. Jackson	
Frank S. Armistead	1856	1st Lieutenant USA, Colonel CSA; Utah Expedition; served as staff officer, later commanded North Carolina Junior Reserves; brother of Lewis Armistead	
William Hicks Jackson	1856	2nd Lieutenant USA, Brigadier General CSA; Indian Wars; served as cavalry commander in the Western Theater	
Owen K. McLemore	1856	2nd Lieutenant USA, Lieutenant Colonel CSA; Bleeding Kansas and Utah Expedition; served in the 4th Alabama Infantry, killed at the Battle of South Mountain	
Fitzhugh Lee	1856	2nd Lieutenant USA, Major General CSA Major General USV; American Indian Wars, later served in the Spanish–American War; First Battle of Bull Run, Battle of Antietam, Battle of Gettysburg, Battle of Opequon, led the last charge of the Army of Northern Virginia on April 9, 1865, at Farmville, Virginia; Governor of Virginia (1886–1890)	
Arthur S. Cunningham	1856	2nd Lieutenant USA, Lieutenant Colonel CSA; Utah Expedition; served as infantry officer and as Inspector General to Richard S. Ewell	
Francis L. Campbell	- (1856)	Colonel CSA; found deficient in maths in 1853; commanded Louisiana infantry in the Western Theater	
William W. Kirkland	- (1856)	2nd Lieutenant USMC, Brigadier General CSA; resigned from West Point in 1855; served with the infantry in the ANV and in North Carolina, only USMC officer to become a Confederate General; nephew-in-law of William J. Hardee	
Nathaniel E. Venable	- (1856)	1st Lieutenant CSA; found deficient in maths and left West Point in 1854; served as an NCO in the 23rd Virginia Infantry before being commissioned into the Confederate States Marine Corps	
Richard Kidder Meade, Jr.	1857	2nd Lieutenant USA, Major CSA; was a Union engineer at Fort Sumter and afterwards joined the CSA, died from sickness in 1862	
Edward Porter Alexander	1857	2nd Lieutenant USA, Brigadier General CSA; served as staff officer and artillery commander in the Army of Northern Virginia, in charge of the massive artillery bombardment preceding Pickett's Charge on the third day of the Battle of Gettysburg	
William Proctor Smith	1857	Bvt. 2nd Lieutenant USA, Colonel CSA; served as an engineer in the Army of Northern Virginia	
Thomas J. Berry	1857	2nd Lieutenant USA, Lieutenant Colonel CSA; served in the 60th Georgia Infantry Regiment	
Oliver H. Fish	1857	2nd Lieutenant USA; Utah Expedition; Confederate service history unknown, died shortly after the war in 1865	
Samuel W. Ferguson	1857	2nd Lieutenant USA, Brigadier General CSA; Utah Expedition; commanded a cavalry brigade in the west	
Manning M. Kimmel	1857	1st Lieutenant USA, Major CSA; Indian Wars and Cortina War; fought for the Union at the First Battle of Bull Run, served as staff officer in the west, father of Admiral Husband E. Kimmel	
George A. Cunningham	1857	2nd Lieutenant USA, Colonel CSA; Utah Expedition; served as an infantry officer and later as heavy artillery officer in the east, west and south	
Henry C. McNeil	1857	2nd Lieutenant USA, Colonel CSA; Indian Wars; commanded the 5th Texas Cavalry Regiment	
Aurelius F. Cone	1857	2nd Lieutenant USA, Lieutenant Colonel or Colonel CSA; served in the Quartermaster Department and was Acting Assistant Quartermaster General of the CSA	
Paul J. Quattlebaum	1857	2nd Lieutenant USA, Lieutenant Colonel CSA; briefly served in the 5th Texas Infantry before becoming a staff and later artillery officer	
John S. Marmaduke	1857	2nd Lieutenant USA, Major General CSA; Utah War; Battle of Shiloh, Battle of Cape Girardeau, Red River Campaign, mortally wounded fellow confederate general and West Point graduate Lucius M. Walker in a duel; Governor of Missouri (1885–1887)	
George W. Holt	1857	2nd Lieutenant USA, Lieutenant Colonel CSA; Indian Wars; served as Adjutant General to S.D. Lee, Franklin Gardner, Richard Taylor and Nathan B. Forrest	
Robert H. Anderson	1857	1st Lieutenant USA, Brigadier General CSA; served as cavalry commander in the Western Theater	
Lafayette Peck	1857	1st Lieutenant USA; became a POW in Texas and was exchanged before joining the CSA, service history unknown, died in 1864	
Llewellyn P. Warren	- (1857)	Surgeon CSA; found deficient in maths in 1854; served as infantry officer and surgeon in various North Carolina regiments	
Moses J. White	1858	Bvt. 2nd Lieutenant USA, Colonel CSA; served as staff and artillery officer, commanded Fort Macon and later briefly a cavalry brigade, died in 1865	
Joseph Dixon	1858	Bvt. 2nd Lieutenant USA, Captain CSA; served as an engineer, killed at Fort Donelson	
William H. Echols	1858	Bvt. 2nd Lieutenant USA, Major CSA; was offered the colonelcy of the 29th Georgia Infantry Regiment but declined on request of Jefferson Davis, served as Chief Engineer of South Carolina	
John S. Saunders	1858	2nd Lieutenant USA, Lieutenant Colonel CSA, Colonel Maryland National Guard; served as artillery and staff officer	
James H. Hallonquist	1858	2nd Lieutenant USA, Lieutenant Colonel CSA; served as artillery and staff officer, commanded the Reserve Artillery of the Army of Tennessee	
Leroy Napier	1858	2nd Lieutenant USA, Lieutenant Colonel CSA; commanded the 8th Georgia Infantry Battalion	
Solomon Williams	1858	2nd Lieutenant USA, Colonel CSA; commanded the 12th North Carolina Infantry and later the 2nd North Carolina Cavalry regiments, was killed at Culpeper Court House	
Richard H. Brewer	1858	1st Lieutenant USA, Major CSA; served as cavalry and staff officer, mortally wounded at Piedmont	
Andrew Jackson III	1858	2nd Lieutenant USA, Colonel CSA; class of 1857, deficient in French in 1855 and turned back into class of 1858; commanded the 1st Tennessee Heavy Artillery Regiment, grandson of President Andrew Jackson	
Bryan M. Thomas	1858	2nd Lieutenant USA, Colonel CSA, Brigadier General CSA (unconfirmed); served in infantry, artillery, cavalry and on staff duty in the Western and Southern Departments	
William G. Robinson	1858	2nd Lieutenant USA, Colonel CSA; commanded the 2nd North Carolina Cavalry Regiment	
Ruffin Y. Ashe	- (1858)	Lieutenant CSA; found deficient in maths in 1856; served as Adjutant of the 11th Alabama Infantry Regiment, killed at Ream's Station	
Robert C. Kennedy	- (1858)	1st Lieutenant CSA; found deficient in maths in 1856; served as infantry and staff officer, was hanged as spy and arsonist in New York City in 1865	
James H. Powe	- (1858)	Captain CSA; class of 1857, deficient in maths and turned back into the class of 1858, resigned in 1855; served in the 1st (Butler's) South Carolina Regular Infantry	
Samuel H. Lockett	1859	Bvt. 2nd Lieutenant USA, Colonel CSA; served as Asst. Instructor of Small Arms and as Asst. Professor of Spanish at West Point; served as an engineer in the Western Theater; became a Colonel in the Egyptian Army	
Charles R. Collins	1859	Bvt. 2nd Lieutenant USA, Colonel CSA; commanded the 15th Virginia Cavalry Regiment, killed at the Battle of Todd's Tavern	
Robert F. Beckham	1859	Bvt. 2nd Lieutenant USA, Colonel CSA; commanded horse artillery in the ANV and corps artillery in the west, mortally wounded at the Battle of Franklin	
Moses H. Wright	1859	2nd Lieutenant USA, Colonel CSA; (Acting) Brigadier General CSA; commanded the Nashville Arsenal and later the Atlanta Arsenal	
Joseph Wheeler	1859	2nd Lieutenant USA, Major General CSA; commanded a cavalry corps in the Western Theater	
Isaac S. Hyams	- (1859)	Captain CSA; left the academy in 1856; served as infantry and staff officer in the Western Theater and the Trans-Mississippi-Dept.	
Benjamin Sloan	1860	Bvt. 2nd Lieutenant USA, Major CSA; served in staffs and as ordnance and artillery officer in the Eastern and Southern Theaters	
William W. McCreery	1860	2nd Lieutenant USA, Captain CSA; dismissed from the U.S. Army when he tried to resign mid-1861, served as ordnance and staff officer, killed at the Battle of Gettysburg	
Stephen Dodson Ramseur	1860	2nd Lieutenant USA, Major General CSA; served in the Eastern Theater, mortally wounded at the Battle of Cedar Creek; cousin to fellow generals Robert Hoke, John H. Forney and Robert D. Johnston	
John M. Kerr	1860	Bvt. 2nd Lieutenant USA, Lieutenant CSA; class of 1859, suspended and turned back into the class of 1860, served as a cavalry officer, died of sickness in early 1862	
John R. B. Burtwell	1860	2nd Lieutenant USA, Colonel CSA; class of 1859, deficient in engineering and turned back into the class of 1860, commanded the 11th Alabama Cavalry Regiment	
Wade H. Gibbes	1860	Bvt. 2nd Lieutenant USA, Major CSA; served as artillery officer in the Eastern Theater	
Frank Huger	1860	2nd Lieutenant USA, Colonel CSA; served as artillery officer in the Eastern Theater, son of Gen. Benjamin Huger	
Edward B. D. Riley	1860	2nd Lieutenant USA, Unknown CSA	
Harold Borland	1860	Bvt. 2nd Lieutenant USA, Major CSA; originally class of 1858, turned back two times for various deficiencies, served as staff officer, son of Solon Borland	
Charles S. Morgan, Jr.	- (1860)	Captain CSA; originally class of 1858, turned back and left for deficiencies in maths; served as staff officer in the Eastern Theater	
Llewellyn G. Hoxton	May 1861	2nd Lieutenant USA, Lieutenant Colonel CSA; served as an artillery officer in the Army of Tennessee	
Nathaniel R. Chambliss	May 1861	2nd Lieutenant USA, Major CSA, 2nd Lieutenant ACSA; served in the Ordnance Dept. in the Western Theater	
Charles E. Patterson	May 1861	2nd Lieutenant USA, Lieutenant Colonel CSA; served in the 2nd Arkansas Infantry Regiment, mortally wounded at the Battle of Shiloh	
Charles C. Campbell	May 1861	2nd Lieutenant USA, Major CSA; served as a staff officer in the Western Theater and in the 1st Missouri Infantry Regiment, resigned in April 1862	
Olin F. Rice	May 1861	2nd Lieutenant USA, Colonel CSA; served as a staff officer and commanded the 2nd Alabama Reserves in the Western Theater	
Mathias W. Henry	May 1861	2nd Lieutenant USA, Major CSA; served as an artillery officer in the Army of Northern Virginia and the Western Theater	
Clarence Derrick	June 1861	Bvt. 2nd Lieutenant USA, Lieutenant Colonel CSA; commanded the 23rd Virginia Infantry Battalion; became a Colonel in the Egyptian Army	
George Owen Watts	June 1861	Bvt. 2nd Lieutenant USA, Major CSA, served in all branches and as staff officer in the Western & Eastern Theaters and the Trans-Mississippi Dept.	
Frank A. Reynolds	June 1861	2nd Lieutenant USA, Lieutenant Colonel CSA; served in the 39th North Carolina Infantry Regiment; became a Colonel in the Egyptian Army	
John Pelham	- (May 1861)	Major CSA, Lieutenant Colonel CSA (posthumously); commanded Stuart's Horse Artillery Btln., killed at the Battle of Kelly's Ford	
Thomas L. Rosser	- (May 1861)	Major General CSA; resigned short of his graduation; served as an artillery officer and cavalry commander in the ANV; became a Brigadier General USV in the Spanish–American War	
Charles P. Ball	- (June 1861)	Colonel CSA; commander of the 8th Alabama Cavalry	
William H. Browne	- (June 1861)	Colonel CSA; commander of the 45th Virginia Infantry, mortally wounded at the Battle of Piedmont	
Paul F. Faison	- (June 1861)	Colonel CSA; commander of the 56th North Carolina Infantry	
John J. Garnett	- (June 1861)	Lieutenant Colonel CSA; was Chief of Artillery for David Rumph Jones and Richard H. Anderson, commanded Garnett's Artillery Battalion, Inspector of Artillery for the Army of Tennessee	
John H. Kelly	- (June 1861)	Brigadier General CSA; resigned short of his graduation; served as an infantry officer in the Western Theater, mortally wounded at the Battle of Franklin	
John Lane	- (June 1861)	Lieutenant Colonel CSA; served as staff officer and artillery commander in the Eastern Theater	
John W. Lea	- (June 1861)	Colonel CSA; commander of the 5th North Carolina Infantry	
Robert H. Logan	- (June 1861)	Lieutenant Colonel CSA; served in the 45th Virginia Infantry	
Alexander D. Moore	- (June 1861)	Colonel CSA; commanded the 66th North Carolina Infantry, mortally wounded at the Battle of Cold Harbor	
William F. Niemeyer	- (June 1861)	Lieutenant Colonel CSA; served in the 61st Virginia Infantry, killed on his 24th birthday at the Battle of Spotsylvania Court House	
James P. Parker	- (June 1861)	Bvt. 2nd Lieutenant USA, Lieutenant Colonel CSA; deficient in conduct in 1861; served in the 1st Mississippi Light Artillery Regiment, was Chief of Artillery to Franklin Gardner and became a POW at Port Hudson	
Felix H. Robertson	- (June 1861)	Brigadier General CSA; resigned short of his graduation; served as a staff and artillery officer in the Southern and Western Theaters, later commanded a brigade and division of cavalry; last surviving General of the Confederacy	
David G. White	- (June 1861)	Major CSA; served in the 6th Arkansas Cavalry Battalion	
Edward S. Willis	- (June 1861)	Colonel CSA; commanded the 12th Georgia Infantry, killed at the Battle of Totopotomoy Creek	
Pierce M. B. Young	- (June 1861)	Major General CSA; resigned short of his graduation; served as a staff officer and cavalry commander in the ANV and the Carolinas	
James Dearing	- (1862)	Colonel CSA, Brigadier General CSA (unconfirmed); resigned in 1861; served with the artillery and cavalry in the ANV, killed during the Appomattox Campaign	
Henry S. Farley	- (1862)	Major CSA; resigned in 1860 as first cadet to go south; served as an artillery and staff officer in the Eastern Theater	
Rice E. Graves	- (1863)	Major CSA; resigned in 1861; served as an artillery officer in the Western Theater, mortally wounded at the Battle of Chickamauga	
Samuel Churchill Clark	- (1864)	Captain CSA; resigned in 1861; son of Meriwether Lewis Clark Sr.; served as artillery officer, killed at the Battle of Pea Ridge	
Elisha S. Hopkins	- (1864)	2nd Lieutenant CSA; found deficient in maths in 1862; served in the 43rd Tennessee Infantry	
Richard M. Nelson	- (1864)	Captain CSA; resigned in 1861; served as infantry and staff officer	

== See also ==
- List of Union Army officers educated at the United States Military Academy
- List of Union Navy officers educated at the United States Naval Academy
