= Augustus Meyers =

American writer

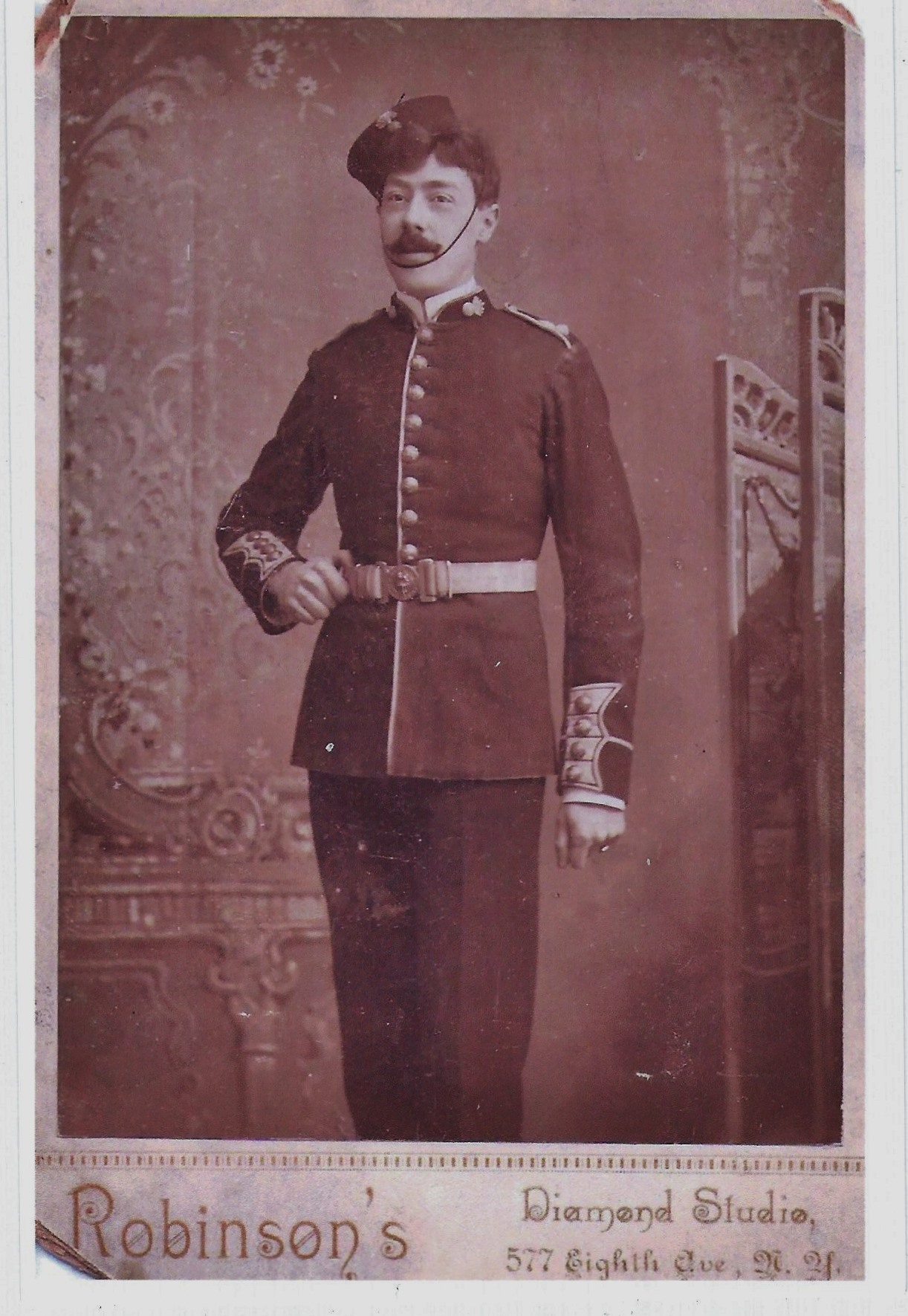
Augustus Meyers. Musician in the US Army, 2nd Infantry

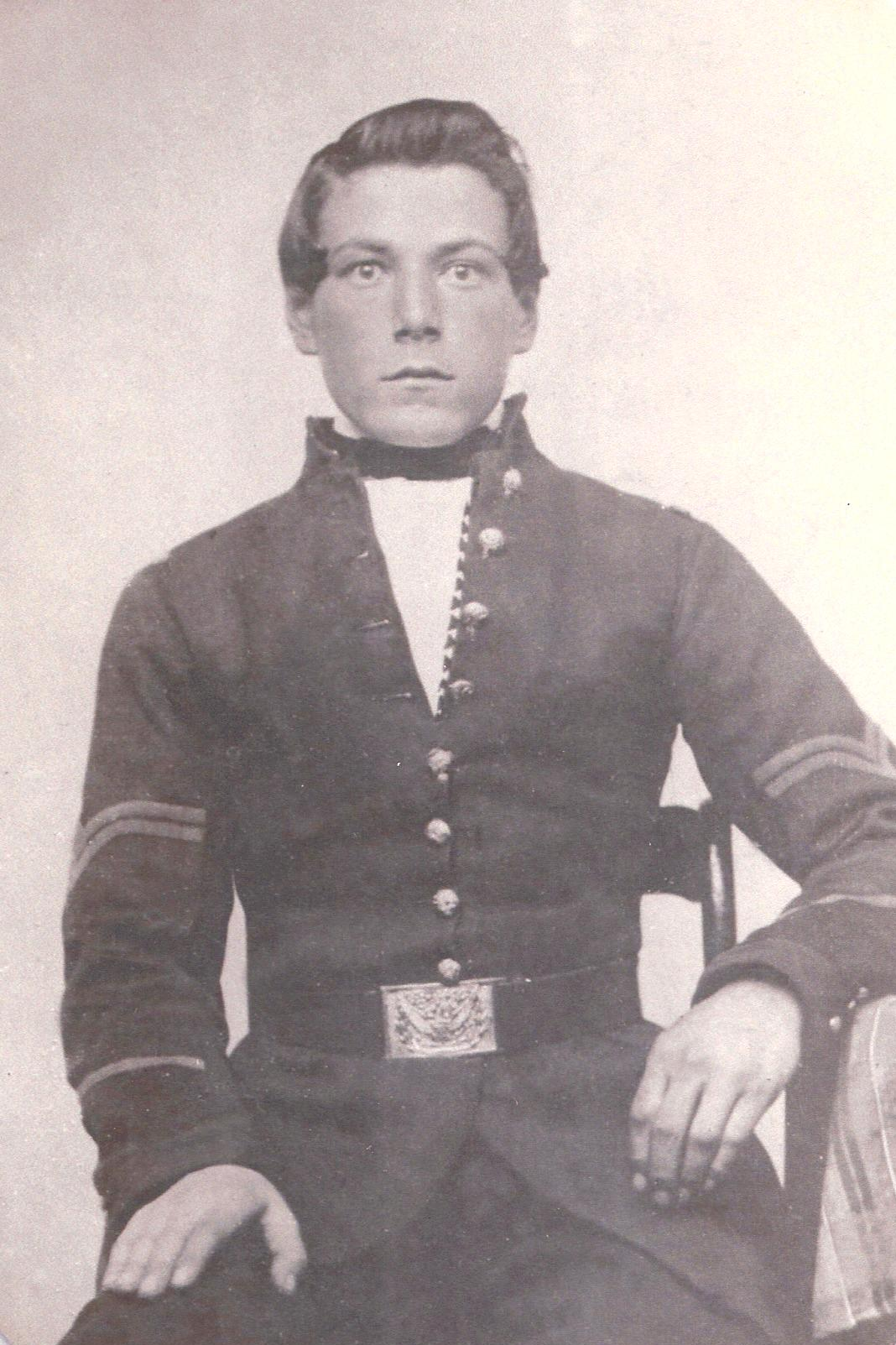
Augustus Meyers in 1863

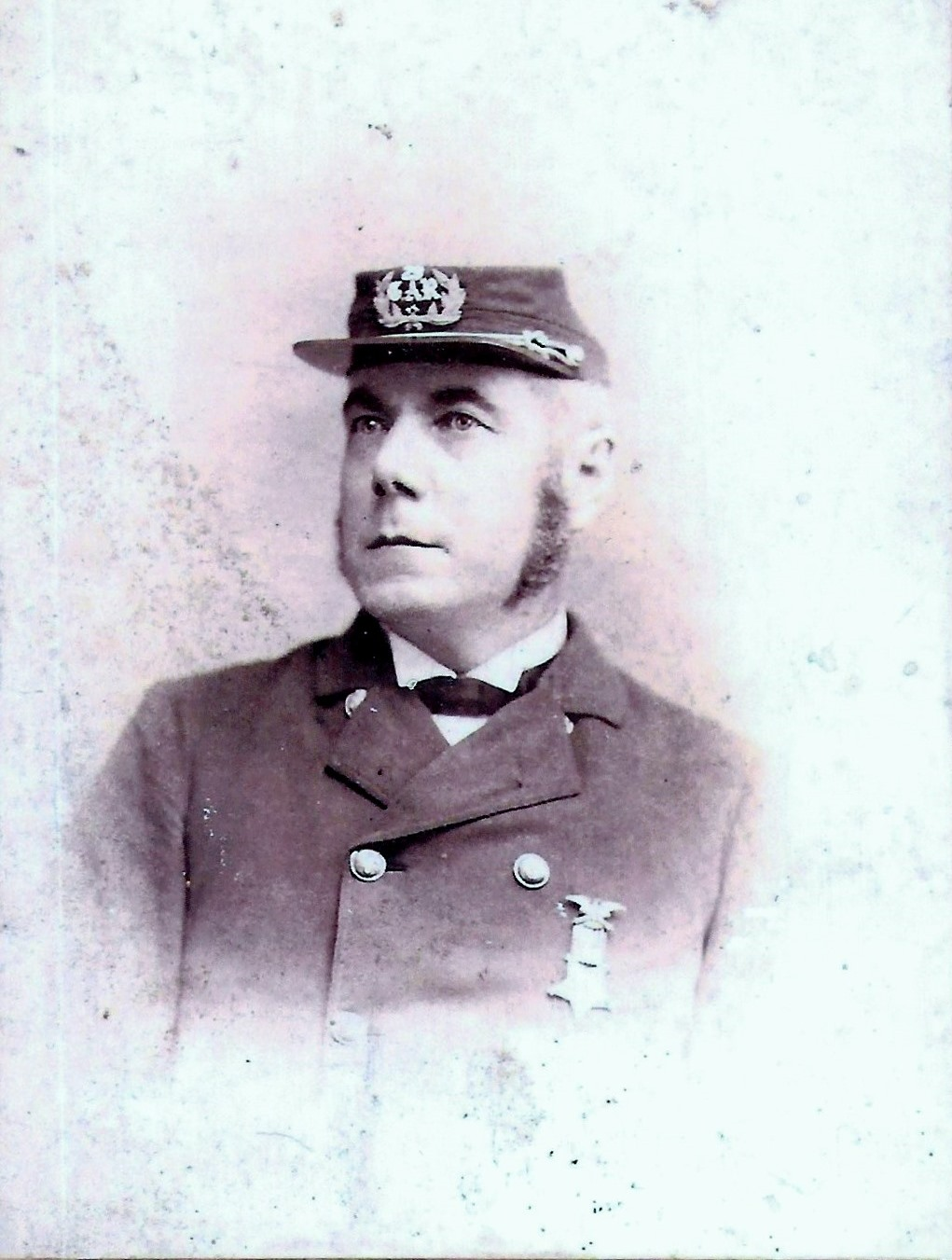
Augustus Meyers. G.A.R. uniform circa 1888

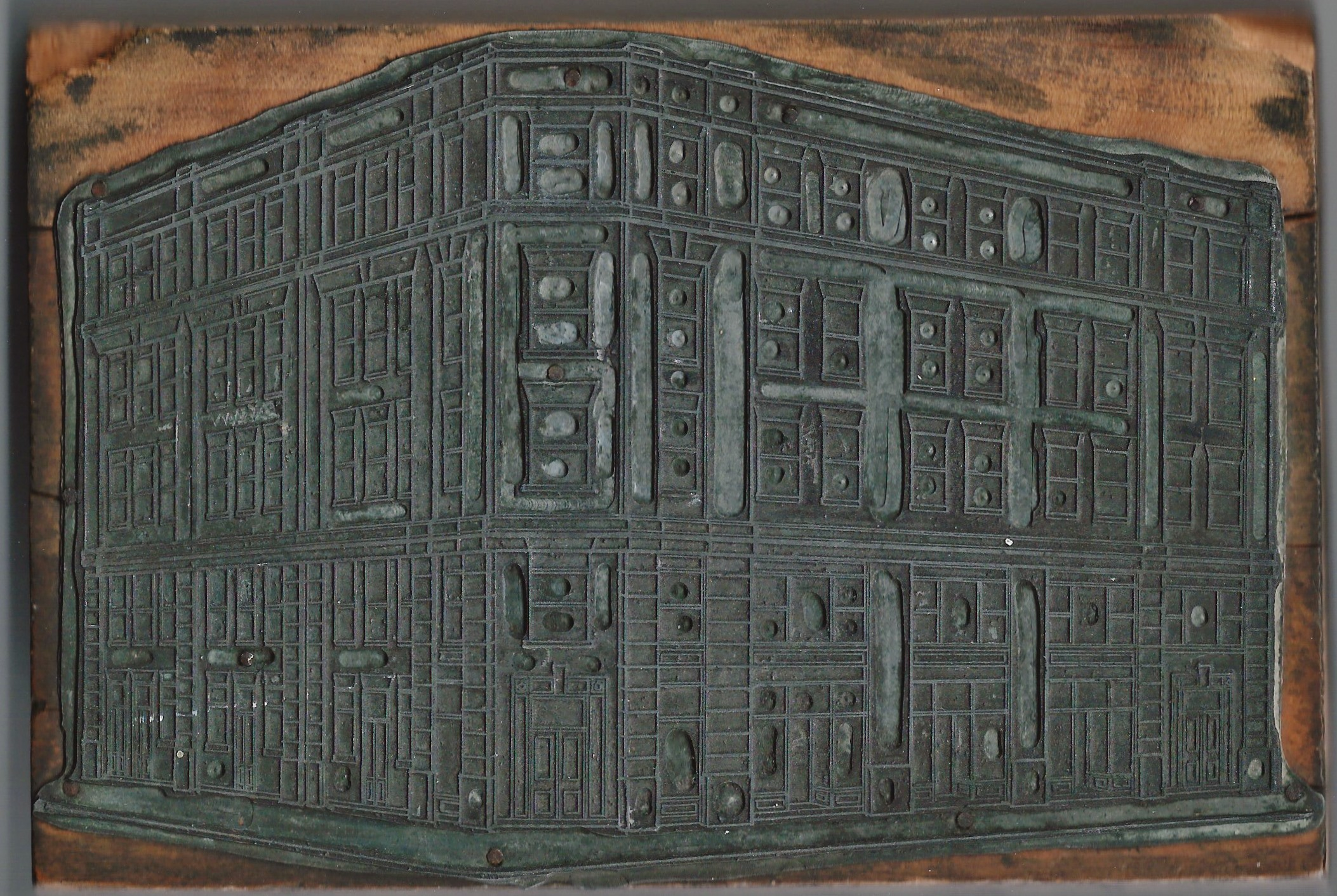
Lead engraving of 120 Eleventh Avenue, Manhattan. Made in 1911 to print marketing materials.

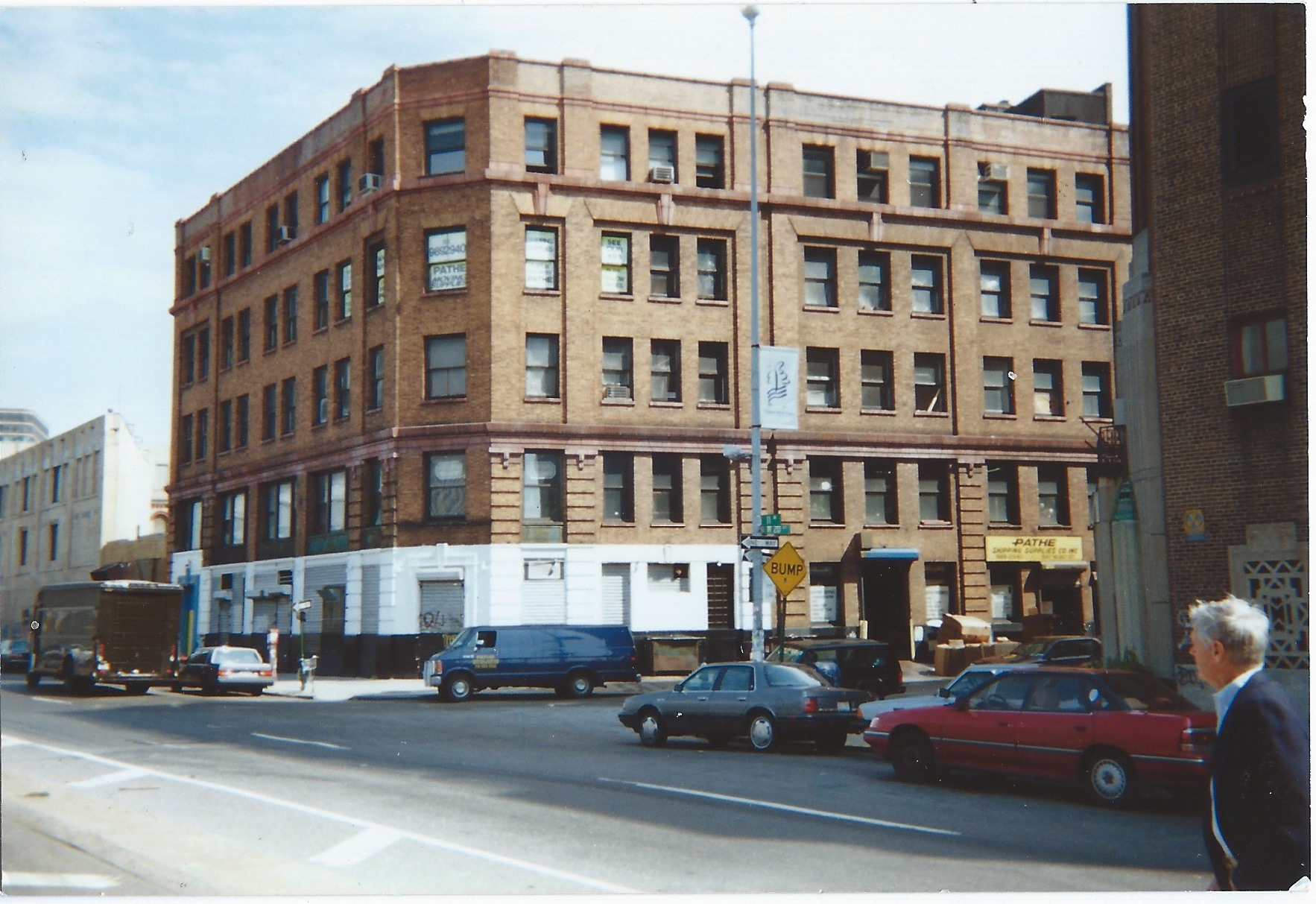
120 Eleventh Avenue, Manhattan. 1994.

Augustus Meyers (1841–1919) was an American soldier during the Civil War best known for writing Ten Years in the Ranks, U.S. Army, an account of his life in the military. The book is an important historical document that contains many unique descriptions of practices that would otherwise be unknown. Augustus was the first to write about the training he received at the School of Practice on Governor's Island, New York, where Army musicians were trained.

Ten Years in the Ranks, U.S. Army was originally published by Stirling Press in 1914 and that edition was reprinted by Arno Press in 1979.

== Military career overview ==
After joining the Army at the age of twelve in 1854, Augustus served for five years in the territories as a musician. Later after reenlisting for a second five-year term, he served in the color guard for the 2nd Infantry Regiment and became the youngest sergeant in his company at age twenty-one. He was detailed as brigade commissary sergeant. Later in the war, during the battle for Petersburg, Augustus was appointed acting ordnance sergeant.

At the end of the war, with the support of the commander Col William F. Drum, Augustus was commissioned as a 2nd Lt. in the 5th New York Volunteer Infantry, also known as Duryee's Zouaves after Colonel Abram Duryée, the original commander of the regiment. Although so commissioned, Augustus was not officially mustered in, choosing to return to civilian life instead. Nevertheless, he was permitted to participate with the group's veterans' association. In 1888, he served as a Vice Chairman of the dedication committee for the unveiling of the bronze statue of Gouverneur K. Warren at Little Round Top, Gettysburg. General Hiram Duryea served as the chairman. At the Battle of Gettysburg, Warren was acting as Chief Engineer for the Army of the Potomac and was directed to Little Round Top by Meade. His initiative during the battle in saving that key position earned him the name "the hero of Little Round Top." The statue by Karl Gerhardt rests on the exact spot where Warren stood when looking over the field on that day. At an earlier time, Warren had commanded the 5th New York. He took over command after Duryée was promoted to the rank of general. The Fifth New York veterans' association funded the creation of the statue.

== Biographical information ==
Augustus Meyers was born on June 21, 1841, in the community of Morschwyl, a part of the Borough of Rorschach, in the Swiss canton of St. Gallen. He was baptized Johann Baptist August Maier. Eventually he adopted the more American spelling of his name. Along with his mother, Franziska (Benz) Maier, later known as Frances, and a half-brother Joseph Peter Maier, he immigrated to the United States in 1852. His father, Joseph Alois Maier, had preceded the family in 1848 but is presumed to have died soon afterwards. They settled in New York City. Augustus lost contact with his half-brother Joseph and after the Civil War spent many years trying to locate him without success.

== Details of military career ==
On March 28, 1854, two years after immigrating, Augustus joined the army for a five-year term. His true age was 12 years and 9 months but he claimed to be 14 in order to qualify. On the roster his name is given as August Maier, occupation pocket-book maker. Augustus had been working in a factory, an indication of the family's poverty. The roster further shows that he was only 4'10" in height with a pale complexion and grey eyes.

He served out the 5-year term as a musician playing the fife and for much of the time he was stationed with Company D of the 2nd US Infantry in the Minnesota and Nebraska Territories, well beyond the reach of civilization.

=== Attempted desertion ===
The record shows that during his service, on September 27, 1857, he deserted from Fort Randall, South Dakota. He was arrested 3 days later in Sioux City, Iowa, having made his way 120 miles down the Missouri River. He was court martialed and sentenced to 6 months of hard labor with a ball and chain and fined $10 plus an additional fine to cover the cost of his recapture. During the trial he declined to testify in his own defense. Fortunately for Augustus, his commanding officer, Captain William M. Gardner, testified on his behalf and prevailed on the court to suspend the harsher penalties. Augustus was only required to make up the 3 days of lost service and pay $30 to cover the cost of his apprehension. The episode is not disclosed in his book. Augustus did however express his gratitude toward the Captain.

=== Captain William Montgomery Gardner ===
Captain William M. Gardner was a graduate of the US Military Academy and had served in the Mexican–American War with distinction. So his support for Augustus carried some weight. Gardner testified that during the three years prior to the desertion, as his commanding officer, he had never found any fault with Augustus. Gardner went on to praise Augustus as about the best boy he had ever seen in the Army. Gardner was from Georgia and when his state seceded he resigned from the U.S. Army and became a lieutenant Colonel in the 8th Georgia Infantry Regiment. In his first engagement at Bull Run Gardner took a miniball in the ankle. Delayed treatment prolonged his suffering but an amputation eventually helped him regain some vitality. He finished his service in administrative positions and went on to live until 1901. Desertions were common from Fort Randall at that time. The region was mostly uninhabited and the few civilized areas operated without much formal authority. Few deserters were recaptured and soldiers took advantage of the opportunity to escape the hardships of service to try their luck in the growing West. For the year 1857, Captain Gardner reported 24 desertions from his Company "D". Of that number, Augustus was the 20th to desert, but he was the only deserter during that year who was recaptured (one other surrendered voluntarily). At the end of his term in 1859 Augustus was discharged at Fort Randall and left to make his own way home back home. When he reenlisted and returned to the territories, Augustus happened to cross paths with Gardner once more. Gardner was on his way to Georgia for a six months furlough but promised Augustus to help him get an appointment to West Point when he returned. However, Gardner never returned and Augustus never met him again. War was declared and Gardner joined the Confederacy before his furlough was up.

As he relates in his book, Augustus lived in close contact with the Dakota Sioux for almost five years while stationed in the Nebraska and Minnesota Territories. He was a keen observer of their customs and he made a deliberate effort to learn their language. His observations were well documented in the book.

After returning to New York City in 1859 Augustus worked diligently to find a career that offered encouraging prospects but he was not successful. He lacked the connections and the experiences in civilian life that were necessary at that time to compete for the few opportunities available. So in March 1860, he reenlisted for another 5 years and was returned to the territories to join his old regiment. At the time neither he nor anyone else anticipated the storm that would overtake the country when Lincoln was elected the following November. When news of the war first reached the soldiers out West they were anxious to join the fight, and they expected with regret that it would be settled before they had a chance to see action. In July 1861 Augustus and his regiment were ordered to Washington and their worries about missing the action were soon extinguished. During the next 4 years they served with the Army of the Potomac and they were engaged in many of the great battles including Manassas, Antietam, Chancellorsville, Fredericksburg and Gettysburg.

== Civilian life ==
Augustus grew up speaking German until he was eleven. After coming to the US he was forced to work before joining the Army, so he never had the advantages of a formal education. Nevertheless, he was able to become sufficiently well educated to write effectively and clearly in English. That is a testament to his self-discipline and his determination to succeed in life. During his service he used his time productively to study. His studies were facilitated by the assistance and encouragement of a few kind mentors, especially Lieutenant James Curtis, a West Point Graduate. After the war, he enrolled in the free night school offered at Cooper Union and earned a degree in architecture. Eventually he married Elizabeth Cozzens from Albany and made his fortune in the building trade. Elizabeth was the daughter of Scots Irish immigrants.

Later in his career, he developed several large warehouse buildings along the Hudson River which still stand today. His first large project, measuring 100,000 square feet, was 547-553 W. 27th / 548-552 W. 28th. It is located just east of 11th Avenue spanning the block between 27th and 28th street. Prior to construction it was pre-leased to the firm of Berlin & Jones. It is now included in the Chelsea historic district, and it has been adapted from its original industrial use to serve as the workspace for multiple eclectic creative commercial tenants including over 2 dozen art galleries. The largest of these is the non-profit Aperture Foundation. The building is now known as the "Landmark Arts Building" having been granted NYC Landmark status. Another building Augustus developed in 1911 still stands at 545-547 West 20th Street/120 Eleventh Avenue. The Spike Bar occupied the corner on the ground floor from the 1970s until 2000. Beginning in the 1980s several commercial photographers moved in taking advantage of the large open lofts. For some time after that it was leased to several art galleries. Now it has been converted to high end residential lofts that were marketed as the "Lifesaver Lofts". It is claimed that Mint Products Company manufactured Life Saver mints there from 1913 to 1916.

Augustus traveled widely and circled the world several times. He had six children and died in NYC in 1919.
