= Morgan–Storrs duel =

1861 in Pensacola, Florida

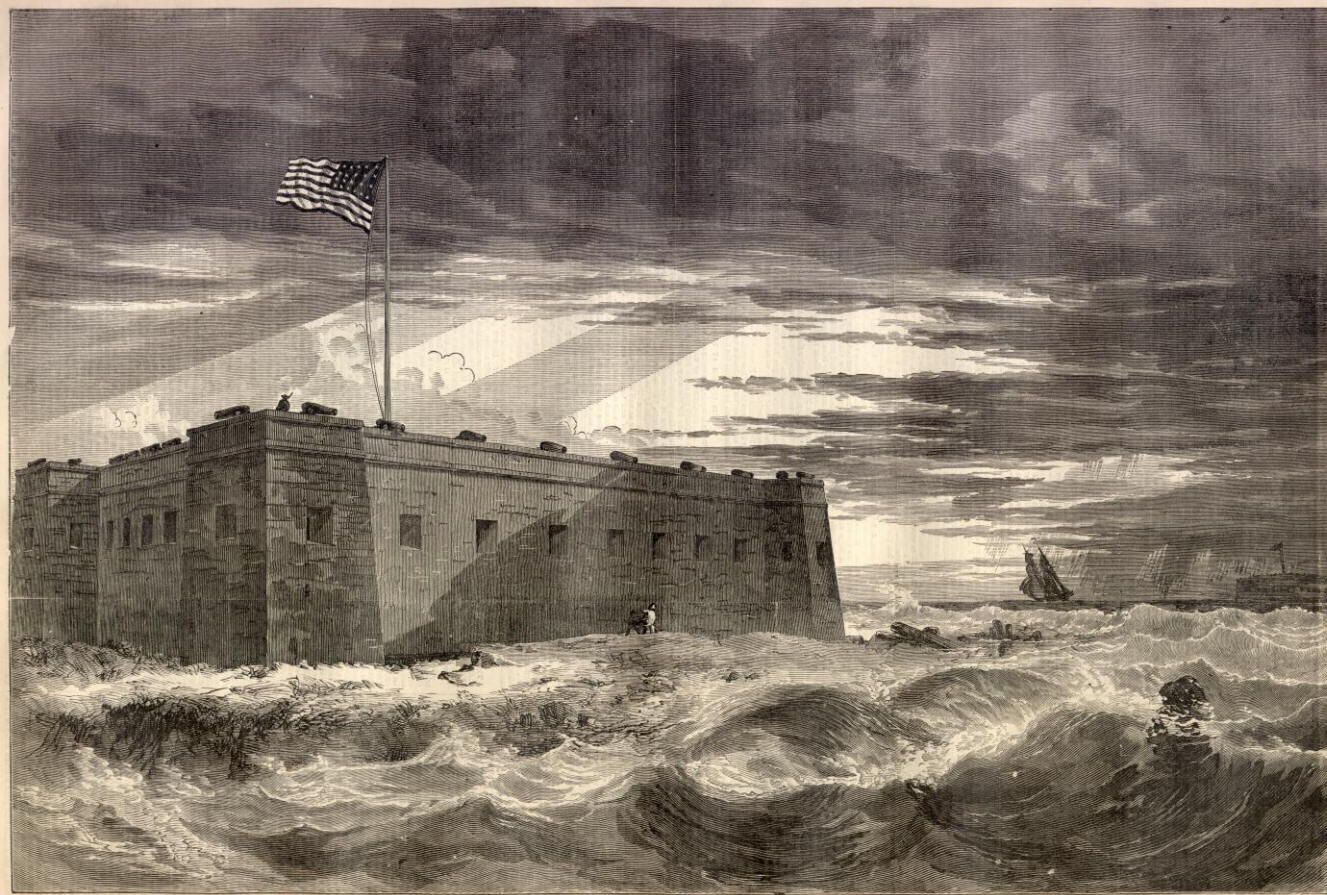
Fort Pickens, Pensacola Harbor, Florida, looking seaward, Fort McRee in the distance, "from a sketch by Mrs. Lieutenant Gilman, just arrived from Pensacola" (Harper's Weekly, February 23, 1861)

The Morgan–Storrs duel was a duel in the early days of the American Civil War between an Alabamian named George S. Storrs and a Tennessean named St. Clair Morgan. The duel took place near Fort McRee at Pensacola, Florida on the night of March 20, 1861. The weapons were Sharps rifles, and the result was that Storrs wounded Morgan. Both duelists had attended United States military service academies and, subsequent to the duel, served as officers in the Confederate States Army.

== Duel ==
Reports about the duel conflicted on a number of details, but most agreed that the duel was fought near Pensacola, at night, with Sharps rifles, and that Storrs wounded Morgan in the groin area, the shot passing through the body and out again. What may be the earliest account of the duel came from a correspondent in nearby Warrington, Florida: "At an early hour yesterday morning the noise of rifles being fired off near Fort McRae [sic] caused the guard on duty, who hurried to the place where the report came from, and they soon discovered that there was a rencontre between two young men who were not attached to any of the companies here. It originated in a misunderstanding, and shots were exchanged, one coming off unhurt, the other being severely wounded in the thigh—it is hoped, however, not dangerously. The wounded man was conveyed to the Naval Hospital, where he is at present under the care of Dr. Hunter." The Tobacco Plant newspaper of Virginia claimed that Morgan fired into the air, but "his antagonist, taking deliberate aim with his Sharp's rifle, wounded him in the groin."

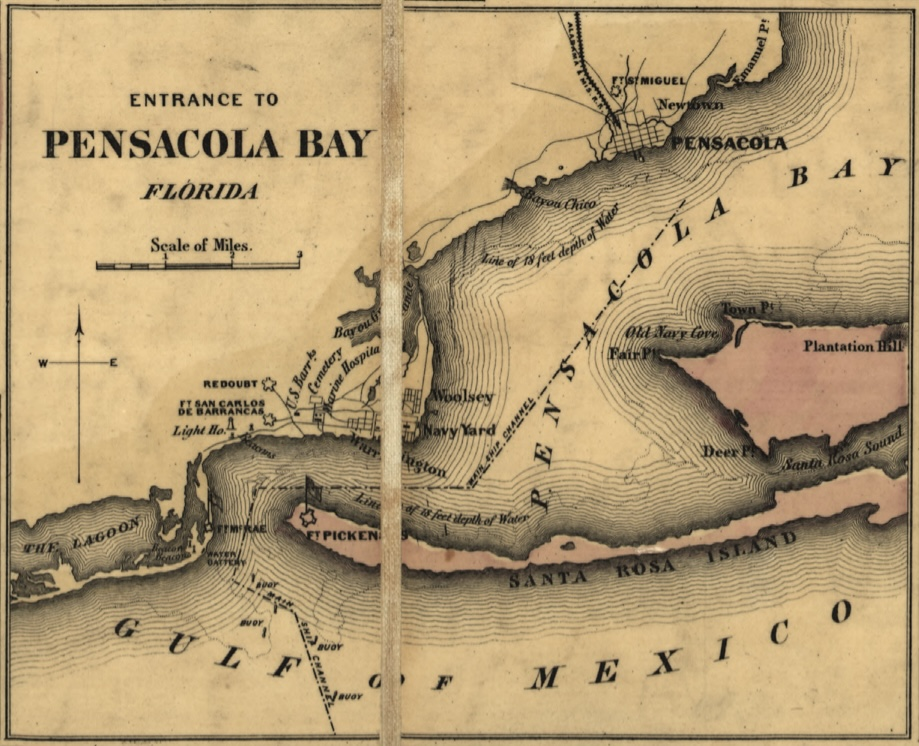
Entrance to Pensacola Bay in 1862 (Colton's maps of U.S. harbors via Library of Congress)

According to a widely republished newspaper report, the precipitating issue was a dispute over whether or not a number of Confederate-aligned men in a small boat should land below the walls of Fort Pickens, which was still under the control of the U.S. Army. The disagreement (Storrs thought it was a bad plan that would get them captured) supposedly led to charges of cowardice and thus the duel. An item in the Brooklyn Evening Star reported that a "Charleston letter" informed their editors that the story about reconnoitering Fort Pickens was "only a pretended one. The real cause of it was as to the possession of a bright mulatto girl. This I know from the best authority. To avoid disgrace, however, this cause was alleged." The "bright mulatto girl" explanation was reprinted in Frederick Douglass' magazine the following month.

Storrs was variously described as an Alabamian, who had until recently been a "midshipman in the U.S. Navy," "an officer of Capt. O'Hara's company," and a visitor at Fort McRee not associated at that time with any military unit. The Storrs who duelled St. Clair Morgan was identified by the Wetumpka Spectator in June 1861 as George S. Storrs.

News of the duel traveled fast to gathering Confederate forces; R. W. McGavock mentioned St. Clair Morgan's injury in his journal entry of March 25, 1861.

== St. Clair Morgan ==
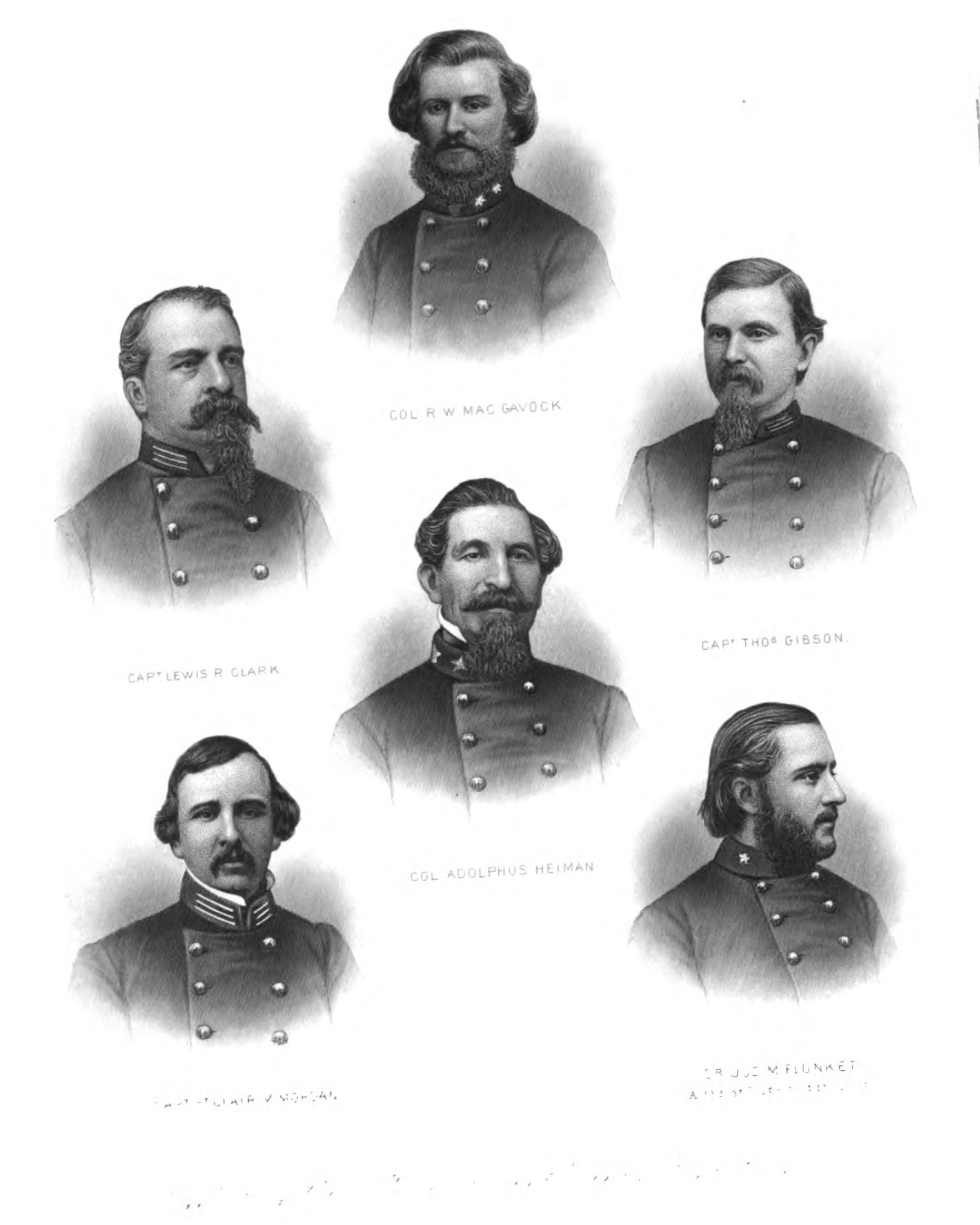
Officers of 10th Tennessee Infantry (Confederate), including R. W. McGavock (top) and St. Clair Morgan (bottom left)

St. Clair McIntosh Morgan was a first cousin of Confederate cavalry officer John Hunt Morgan. Morgan was appointed from Tennessee to the United States Military Academy, in the same class as Jerome Bonaparte, Alexander McCook, and Philip Sheridan. However, in the class registers for 1849, 1850, and 1851, Morgan typically had the lowest grades and the highest number of demerits. Morgan submitted his resignation to the academy in 1851, per a letter held in a collection of his father's papers at the Tennessee State Library. According to the USMA Archives and Special Collections Division, Morgan resigned June 20, 1851, "deficient in Natural and Experimental Philosophy." Morgan's Cullum number is x-1852.

Some early reports of the duel claimed "Morgan is the man who fired the first shot at the Star of the West" from Morris Island in Charleston Harbor. Current thinking generally attributes the first shot at the Star of the West to Citadel Cadet George E. Haynesworth. In April 1861 the Chicago Tribune commented on the claim: "[Morgan] left Charleston in January in consequence of a fight with a New Yorker, Capt. Amos Colt, agent for the sale of Col. Colt's arms; the quarrel being forced on Colt by the Tennessean, who accused Colt of being the New York Tribune's correspondent, and struck him with a glove, when Colt incontinently gave him a most deserved thrashing in the hall fronting the counter of the Charleston Hotel, some fifty persons witnessing the scene. Something like a challenge passed subsequently, but nothing came of it, and Morgan found so cold South Carolinian shoulders turned upon him in consequence, that he presently departed for Florida. With respect to his being the man who fired upon the Star of the West, the statement may be true, or a bit of lying braggadocia. There were many claimants to the honor in Charleston, which was not generally assigned to St Clair." The Tribune concluded this paragraph with the assertion that Morgan's mother, Matilda Grant Rose McIntosh Morgan, had once been tried in a court of law for whipping an enslaved girl to death.

Morgan's 1861 gunshot injury caused him ongoing health problems but he recovered well enough to serve in the Confederate States Army. He enlisted September 1, 1861, and became Captain of a company of the 10th Tennessee (Confederate). The company he organized may have mustered in at Fort Donelson. Morgan was killed at the Battle of Chickamauga.

== George S. Storrs ==
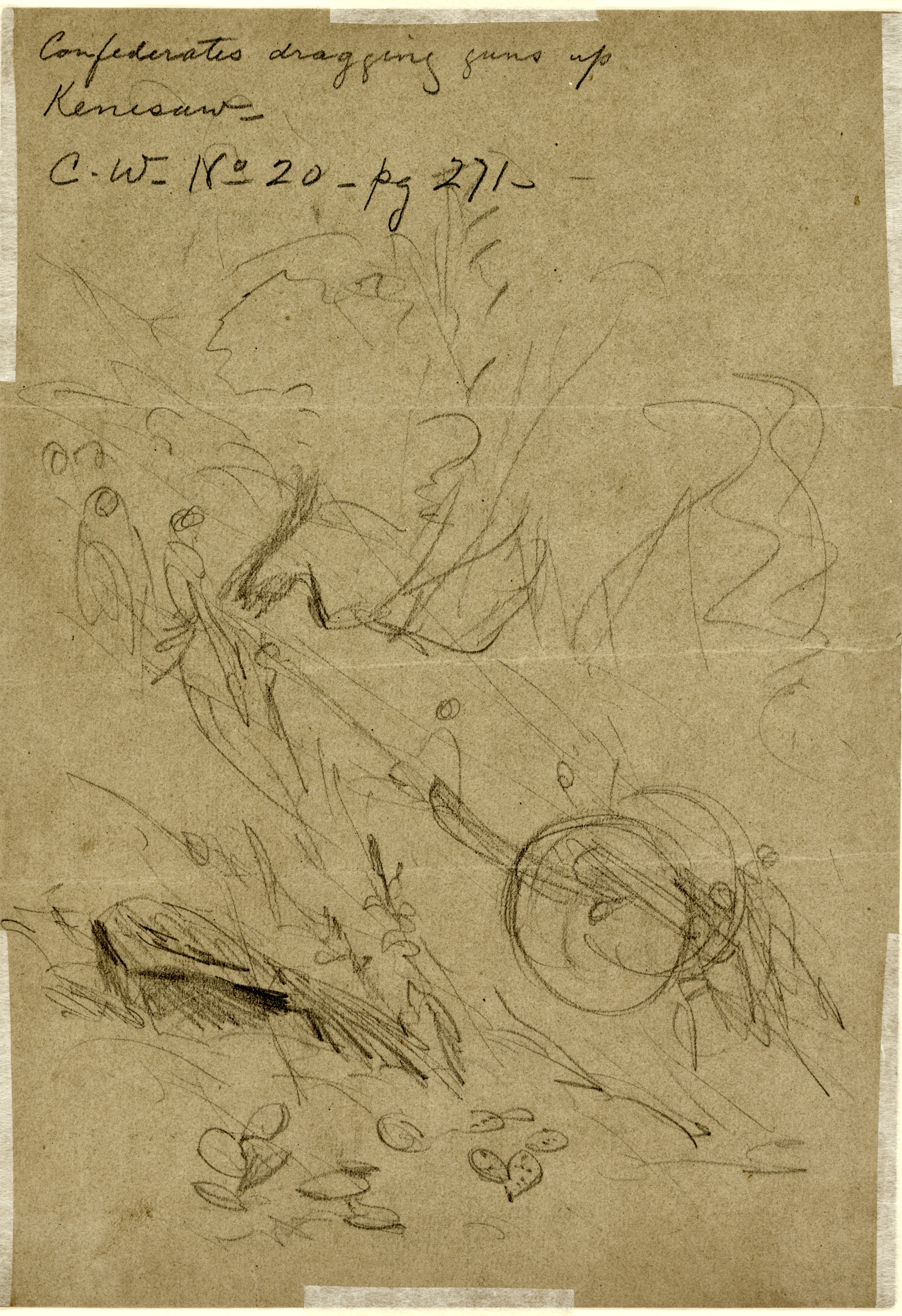
"Confederates dragging guns up Kenesaw" sketched by A. R. Waud at the Battle of Kennesaw Mountain depicts an effort led by Storrs

George Strong Storrs graduated from the United States Naval Academy in 1858, and served a two-year tour on the USS Wabash (1855) in company with classmate and future admiral George Dewey. Storrs' older brother was a junior officer in the Confederate States Army and was accidentally killed by a camp sentry at Norfolk, Virginia in May 1861. Storrs' younger brother became a captain in the 7th Alabama Cavalry Regiment. Storrs enlisted in the Confederate States Army on July 19, 1861. After moving up the ranks he ultimately served as an officer in French's Division of the Confederate Army of Tennessee, and was remembered in the memoirs of his commanding officer, Major-General Samuel Gibbs French, as "Major Storrs, my chief of artillery, a most gallant man." Storrs' most notable achievement of the war was his 1864 emplacement of cannons on the crest of Little Kennesaw Mountain in Georgia: "Given permission to try to place the guns on the steep mountain, Storrs soon had crews hauling guns up the mountain. They had to cut trails with axes. Since the mountain was too steep for horses, the soldiers tied ropes to the guns and pulled them up by hand." The battle of Kennesaw Mountain was a decisive Confederate victory. When General Joseph E. Johnston surrendered in North Carolina in April 1865, Storrs sent his men and their horses home from the unit's encampment in Augusta, Georgia.

After the war, Storrs went to Brazil for a time, then worked for railroads in the Pacific states, and finally moved to Texas. He married, became a teacher, and then worked for several years as a surveyor in Texas for real estate developments and railroad lands. He resided in Dallas for the rest of life with his wife, also a schoolteacher. Storrs died in a convalescent home in Dallas in 1930, at the age of 91.

Storrs' papers from the American Civil War, held in the Richmond County Historical Society manuscript collection in Augusta, Georgia, offer valuable details about the daily lives of Confederate officers and Confederate artillery strategy. During his lifetime, Storrs published several articles and poems reflecting his Civil War experience, including a poem published 1883 called "Bury the Hatchet" that acknowledged Confederate defeat and urged the former Rebels to contribute to the advancement of the reunited States.

== See also ==
- List of Confederate duels
- List of Confederate States Army officers educated at the United States Military Academy
- Field artillery in the American Civil War
- List of United States Military Academy non-graduate alumni
