= School of Practice =

US Army school of music (c. 1836–1880s)

Coordinates: 40°41′17″N 74°0′55″W

School of Practice for U.S.A. Field Musicians
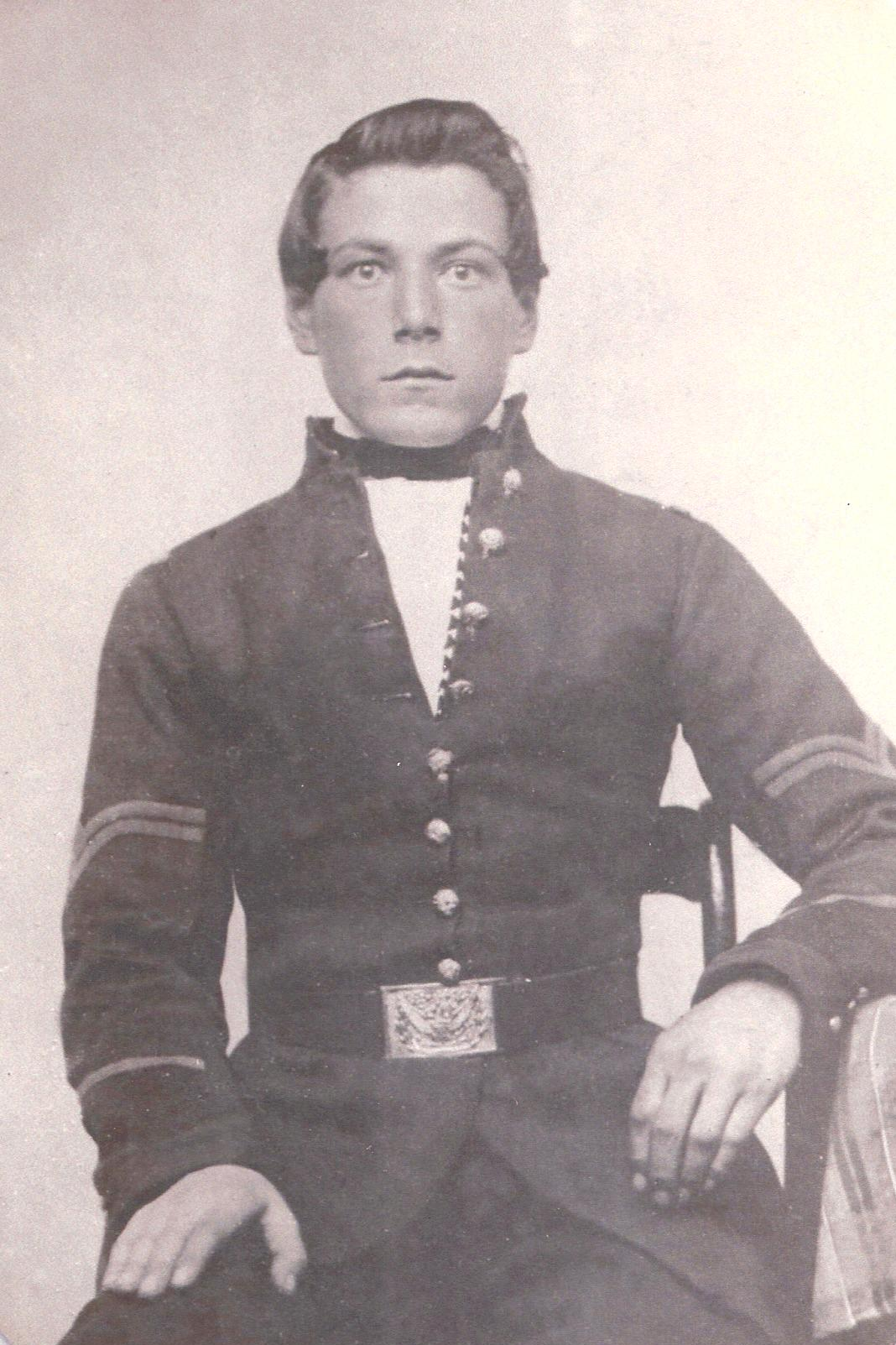
- Alumnus Augustus Meyers, whose writings are the main historical documentation of the school (1856)

Location
- Fort Columbus, Governors Island, New York; United States

Information
- Type: Music school
- Established: c. 1836
- Closed: c. 1880s
- Authority: United States Army
- Gender: Single-sex (male)

The School of Practice (School of Practice for U.S.A. Field Musicians) at Fort Columbus, Governors Island, in New York Harbor was the United States Army's institute for musical training before and during the American Civil War. Much of the historical documentation of the School comes from Ten Years in the Ranks, U.S. Army, a book written by Augustus Meyers after enlisting at age twelve in the 1850s. The first part deals with the School of Practice. The official training guide, adopted by the War Department, was George G. Bruce's The Drummers and Fife Guide, which was used until the end of the Civil War.

== History ==
The school appears to be one of two that were established at Fort Columbus and Newport Barracks, Kentucky in the later 1830s. Both posts were the eastern and western recruiting centers for the U.S. Army infantry. Little more is known about the school at Newport Barracks.

The school was housed in a former fortification and battery called South Battery which was constructed prior to the War of 1812. From about 1836 to about 1878, musicians at the school, typically teenaged boys, orphaned or with few occupational prospects, lived in small rooms with double bunk beds, consisting of large bags filled with straw. Meals consisted of stapes like rice or bean soup, bread, potatoes, boiled salt beef or pork, and coffee. Enlistees earned seven dollars a month, for training six days a week.

By the late 1870s, Fort Columbus was designated as a major army headquarters, bringing numerous generals to the post. To serve their needs South Battery was converted into an officers mess. The music school was relocated to a barracks at Fort Jay, another fortification a couple of hundred yards away also on Governors Island. By the 1880s, the historical record of the school disappears.
