= Thomas Grimke Rhett =

American and Confederate Army officer (1821–1878)

- Born: August 2, 1821; Schenectady, New York
- Died: July 28, 1878 (aged 56); Baltimore, Maryland
- Burial place: Loudon Park Cemetery
- Military career
- Allegiance: United States of America; Confederate States of America; Khedivate of Egypt
- Branch: United States Army; Confederate States Army; Egyptian Army
- Service years: 1845–1861 (US); 1861–1865 (CSA); 1865–1873 (Egypt)
- Rank: Major (US); Brigadier General (South Carolina); Major (CSA); Colonel (Egypt)
- Conflicts: Mexican-American War; American Civil War

Thomas Grimke Rhett was a graduate of the United States Military Academy at West Point, New York, and a United States Army officer who served from July 1, 1845, to April 1, 1861. He served in the Mexican-American War in 1847–1848. Rhett was awarded a brevet appointment as captain for gallantry in the defense of Puebla, Mexico, during the Siege of Puebla, October 12, 1847. After his resignation from the U.S. Army, April 1, 1861, he was appointed a brigadier general in the South Carolina Militia but did not serve in that office. He was a staff officer in the Confederate States Army in the Eastern Theater of the American Civil War from April 1861 until May 31, 1862. He first served as voluntary aide-de-camp to General Pierre G. T. Beauregard and then major from April to July, 1861. Rhett then served as chief of staff to Beauregard's successor, General Joseph E. Johnston. After Johnston was wounded on May 31, 1862, and was succeeded in command by General Robert E. Lee, Rhett was transferred to the District of Arkansas in Confederacy's Trans-Mississippi Department where he served as chief of ordnance. From April 1863 until the end of the war in 1865, he served as chief of artillery in the Trans-Mississippi Department. From 1865 to 1873, he served as a colonel of ordnance in the Egyptian Army.

== Early life ==
Thomas Grimke Rhett was born in South Carolina on August 2, 1821, as Thomas Moore Smith. He was the son of James Smith (Rhett) (1797–1855) and Charlotte Haskell (Rhett) (1794–1871). The family changed their surname to Rhett in 1837. Rhett graduated from the United States Military Academy on July 1, 1845, ranking 6th in a class of 41 cadets.

Rhett was appointed brevet second lieutenant in the Ordnance Department of the U.S. Army on July 1, 1845, and served at the Washington Arsenal. Rhett was appointed a second lieutenant in the United States Regiment of Mounted Riflemen on May 27, 1846, and ordered to Mexico.

On June 10, 1846, Rhett married Ann Graham Mason, the daughter of Thomson Francis Mason (1785–1838), a descendant of George Mason. The Rhetts had seven children by 1854 but the source does not show any of them living to adulthood.

Rhett was promoted to first lieutenant, in the U.S. Army's Regiment of Mounted Riflemen, reorganized in 1861 as the 3rd Cavalry Regiment (United States), on April 18, 1847. He was appointed brevet captain for gallantry at the Siege of Puebla, Mexico, October 12, 1847. Rhett was a member of the Aztec Club of 1847, which was founded as a military society of officers who served with the United States Army in the Mexican-American War.

After the Mexican-American War, Rhett served on commissary and recruiting duty in 1847–1848. Then he served in the Regiment of Mounted Riflemen on the frontier at posts including Fort Laramie, Dakota Territory (Wyoming), 1849–1852 and Corpus Christi, Texas, 1852–1855. Rhett was promoted to captain in the Regiment of Mounted Riflemen on September 16, 1853. After his duty at Corpus Christi, he served at Fort McIntosh, Texas, 1855; Fort Fillmore, New Mexico, 1857; Fort Union, New Mexico, 1858. He was promoted to a staff position, major, U.S.A. and paymaster on June 14, 1858. Finally, he served at Fort Bliss, Texas, 1859–1861 on paymaster duty. On February 16, 1861, Brigadier General and Brevet Major General David E. Twiggs, a Georgia native, surrendered all U.S. forts in Texas to Texas Confederates led by Ben McCulloch, despite having been relieved of command of the Department of Texas by United States Secretary of War Joseph Holt in an order dated January 18, 1861, the day that Holt assumed office from John B. Floyd of Virginia who became a Confederate States Army brigadier general.

== American Civil War ==
After the surrender of Fort Bliss to a Confederate force, Rhett reported to the provisional Confederate government at Montgomery, Alabama. He was appointed major of artillery in the Confederate States Army on March 16, 1861, which was not the level of appointment he desired. He then returned to South Carolina where he was commissioned brigadier general in the South Carolina Militia by Governor Francis W. Pickens. It was only on April 1, 1861, that Rhett officially resigned from the United States Army. Rhett did not serve as a brigadier general in the South Carolina Militia. In April 1861, he served as a volunteer aide-de-camp to Confederate General Pierre G. T. Beauregard. On May 16, 1861, he was appointed major and assistant adjutant general to Colonel George H. Terrett's Virginia Brigade in the Provisional Army of Virginia, which supported the Confederacy before Virginia formally seceded from the Union and in June merged into the Confederate States Army.

Rhett was major, assistant adjutant general and chief of staff to General Joseph E. Johnston from July 20, 1861, until May 31, 1862. From July 20, 1861, to March 14, 1862, his official position was Chief of Staff and Assistant Adjutant General in the Confederate Army of the Potomac. When the name of the army was changed to the Army of Northern Virginia, Rhett was Chief of Staff of the Army for the Army of Northern Virginia from March 14, 1862, to May 31, 1862, when Johnston was wounded at the Battle of Seven Pines and replaced by General Robert E. Lee.

Rhett was then transferred to the Trans-Mississippi Department. From May 1862 to April 1863, Rhett was chief of ordnance in the District of Arkansas, Trans-Mississippi Department of the Confederacy, serving under Lieutenant General Theophilus H. Holmes starting October 22, 1862. From April 30, 1863, to the end of the war in June 1865, Rhett was chief of artillery in the Trans-Mississippi Department, under the command of General E. Kirby Smith.

== Later life ==
After the war Rhett left the United States and was appointed colonel of ordnance in the Egyptian army from 1865 until 1873. Then, he had a paralytic stroke, and resigned. He remained abroad in Europe until 1876. He was not able to find relief from his condition there. He returned to the United States and lived with relatives in Baltimore, Maryland, in 1876.

Thomas Grimke Rhett died of a paralytic stroke in Baltimore on July 28, 1878. He was buried in Green Mount Cemetery in Baltimore. His body was later moved to Loudon Park Cemetery.
