= William M. Gardner =

Former US Army veteran from the American Civil War era

William Montgomery Gardner
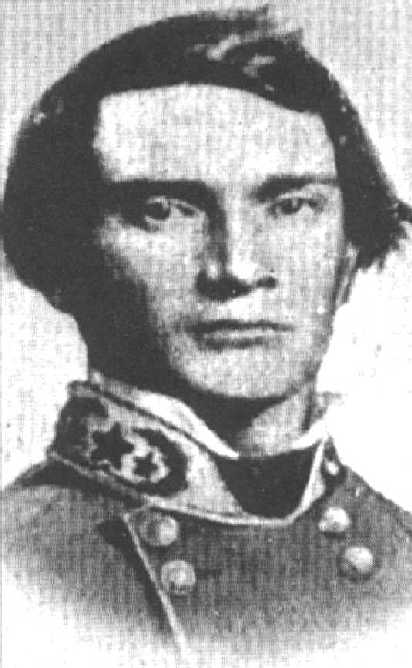
- Brig. Gen. William M. Gardner
- Born: June 8, 1824; Augusta, Georgia
- Died: June 16, 1901 (aged 77); Memphis, Tennessee
- Burial place: Memphis, Tennessee
- Military career
- Allegiance: United States of America; Confederate States of America
- Branch: United States Army; Confederate States Army
- Service years: 1846–1861 (USA); 1861–1865 (CSA)
- Rank: Captain, USA; Brigadier General (CSA)
- Units: 7th U.S. Infantry; 2nd U.S. Infantry
- Commands: 8th Georgia Infantry; District of Middle Florida; Commandant of Richmond
- Conflicts: Mexican–American War; American Civil War

William Montgomery Gardner (June 8, 1824 – June 16, 1901) was a Confederate States Army brigadier general, during the American Civil War. Before the Civil War, he served in the U.S. Army for 15 years. He was a veteran of the Mexican–American War.

== Early life ==
William Montgomery Gardner was born on June 8, 1824, at Augusta, Georgia. He graduated from the United States Military Academy in 1846. He served in the Mexican–American War in the 2nd U.S. Infantry Regiment. He was wounded at the Battle of Churubusco, Mexico and the Battle of Contreras, Mexico. Gardner was promoted to captain on March 3, 1855. He resigned from the U.S. Army on January 19, 1861.

== American Civil War ==
After his resignation from the U.S. Army, Gardner was appointed as a major of infantry in the regular army of the Confederate States on March 16, 1861. He was appointed Assistant Adjutant General for the Defenses of Savannah, Georgia, on May 30, 1861, but was also appointed lieutenant colonel of the 8th Georgia Infantry Regiment at the end of May 1861. Acting in that assignment, Gardner was severely wounded in the leg at the Battle of First Bull Run (First Manassas), July 21, 1861. Gardner was commissioned colonel on the date of the battle because the colonel of the regiment, Francis S. Bartow, had been killed. Gardner's later wound also was taken to be fatal. He took a year to recover and was incapacitated for further field service but he did survive. While he was recovering, Gardner was appointed brigadier general, to rank from November 14, 1861.

On April 1, 1862, William M. Gardner was appointed Assistant Commissary General of Subsistence for the 1st Corps of the Army of Mississippi. From October 6, 1863, through February 23, 1864, he was in command of the District of Middle Florida.

Warner states that Gardner participated in the Battle of Olustee, Florida in February 1864, although Longacre notes that Gardner's commanding officer, General P.G.T. Beauregard, did not give Gardner a field command due to his physical limitations. Sifakis states there is nothing in the Official Records to indicate Gardner participated in the battle. In fact, recent histories of the Civil War in Florida show that Gardner had been on sick leave in February 1864 and that Beauregard ordered Gardner to take command of the Confederate force pursuing the Union force's retreat toward Jacksonville, Florida only after the battle, when he realized Gardner had returned to duty. Gardner in fact assumed command of the force in the field soon after the battle and had his troops begin to erect fortifications outside Jacksonville until Beauregard himself arrived to take charge of the Confederate force and direct completion of the construction of defenses in March 1864.

Between July 26, 1864, and March 3, 1865, Gardner was chief of prisons in Virginia, North Carolina, South Carolina and Florida. Thereafter, he was commandant of the post at Richmond, Virginia, until April 2, 1865 and briefly also Chief of the Bureau of Prisons between March 20 and March 24, 1865. No record of Gardner's parole has been found.

== Aftermath ==
After the Civil War, Gardner lived for a while in Georgia and then moved to Tennessee. William Montgomery Gardner died June 16, 1901, at a son's home in Memphis, Tennessee. He is buried in Elmwood Cemetery at Memphis.

== See also ==
- List of American Civil War generals (Confederate)
